= The KLF discography =

This discography lists the key British and notable international releases of The KLF and the other pseudonyms of Bill Drummond and Jimmy Cauty. It also details the other releases on their independent record label, KLF Communications, by KLF-spinoff Disco 2000 and Space (Cauty's solo work). In the United Kingdom—their home country—Drummond and Cauty released six albums and a wide array of 12 " singles on KLF Communications. In other territories their material was typically issued under licence by local labels.

Although the duo's early works as The Justified Ancients of Mu Mu (The JAMs) aroused media interest, with many singles being awarded "single of the week" by various music publications, Drummond and Cauty neither sought nor found mainstream chart success until the release of The Timelords' million-selling DIY release "Doctorin' the Tardis" in May 1988. The KLF's single "Kylie Said to Jason", from The White Room soundtrack, was designed for chart success, but failed to reach the UK Top 100. However, The KLF achieved international chart success with the string of pop-house singles that began with "What Time Is Love? (Live at Trancentral)", and they became the internationally highest-selling singles band of 1991.

Note that this is a not a complete list; compilation appearances of otherwise available tracks, bootleg recordings, and certain very limited edition remix and promotional singles have been excluded. (Note: The KLF's complete discography is complex, and it contains many variants and obscure items of interest only to collectors. Limited edition and white label remix singles bearing the same basic catalogue numbers and no new songs (such as KLF 004Y, the Moody Boys and Echo & the Bunnymen remixes of "What Time Is Love? (Live At Trancentral)"); bootlegs; and overseas releases which offer no additional material to the definitive KLF Communications UK catalogue are all outside the scope of this article. Readers interested in collecting KLF Communications releases should refer to Lazlo's KLF discography (Longmire, Ernie; et al. (2020) [1998]. "Discography: The KLF (including The JAMS, The Timelords, 2K etc.)". Archived from the original on 29 February 2020.) which is the main source from which this article has been compiled.)

== Albums ==
=== Studio albums ===
Title	Album details	Peak chart positions								Certification
Title	Album details	UK	UK Indie	AUS	AUT	NLD	SWE	SWI	US	Certification
1987 (What the Fuck Is Going On?)	Artist: The Justified Ancients of Mu Mu; Released: 15 June 1987; Label: The Sound Of Mu(sic) KLF Communications	—	5	—	—	—	—	—	—	
Who Killed The JAMs?	Artist: The Justified Ancients of Mu Mu; Released: 8 February 1988; Label: KLF Communications	—	3	—	—	—	—	—	—	
The "What Time Is Love?" Story	Artist: The KLF / Various Artists; Released: 25 September 1989; Label: KLF Communications	—								
Chill Out	Artist: The KLF; Released: 5 February 1990; Label: KLF Communications	—	—	—	—	—	—	—	—	
Space	Artist: Space; Released: 16 July 1990; Label: KLF Communications	—	—	—	—	—	—	—	—	
The White Room	Artist: The KLF; Released: 4 March 1991; Label: KLF Communications	3	—	5	13	11	12	13	39	RIAA: Gold; BPI: Platinum; MC: Platinum; ARIA: Gold; NVPI: Gold
"—" denotes that the release did not chart

=== Compilation albums ===
Title	Album details	Peak chart positions
Title	Album details	UK Indie
Shag Times	Artist: The Justified Ancients of Mu Mu/The KLF; Released: 16 January 1989; Label: KLF Communications; Catalogue number: JAMS DLP 3 / JAMS CD 3	5
MU	Artist: The KLF; Released: 18 December 1991; Label: KLF Communications/DJ:/Toshiba-EMI; Catalogue number: TOCP-6916	—
This Is What The KLF Is About I	Artist: The KLF; Released: 30 September 1992; Label: KLF Communications/DJ:/Toshiba-EMI; Catalogue number: TOCP-7401-3	
This Is What The KLF Is About II	Artist: The KLF; Released: 30 September 1992; Label: KLF Communications/DJ:/Toshiba-EMI; Catalogue number: TOCP-7404-6	
Solid State Logik 1	Artist: The KLF; Released: 1 January 2021; Label: KLF Communications	—
Come Down Dawn	Artist: The KLF; Released: 4 February 2021; Label: KLF Communications	
Solid State Logik 2	Artist: The KLF; Released: 23 March 2021; Label: KLF Communications	—
The White Room (1989 Director's Cut)	Artist: The KLF; Released: 23 April 2021; Label: KLF Communications	
"—" denotes that the release did not chart

== Singles ==
Year	Single	Artist	Peak chart positions											Certifications (sales thresholds)	Album
Year	Single	Artist	UK	UK Indie	AUS	AUT	IRE	NLD	NOR	SWE	SWI	US	US Dance	Certifications (sales thresholds)	Album
1987	"All You Need Is Love": JAMS 23	The Justified Ancients of Mu Mu	—	-	—	—	—	—	—	—	—	—	—		Single Only
1987	"All You Need Is Love (106BPM)": JAMS 23T / JAMS 23S	The Justified Ancients of Mu Mu	—	3	—	—	—	—	—	—	—	—	—		1986 (What The Fuck's Going On?)
1987	"Whitney Joins The JAMs": JAMS 24T	The Justified Ancients of Mu Mu	—	4	—	—	—	—	—	—	—	—	—		Singles only
1987	"1987 (The JAMS 45 Edits)": JAMS 25T	The Justified Ancients of Mu Mu	—	35	—	—	—	—	—	—	—	—	—		Singles only
1987	"I Gotta CD": D 2000 / D2000T / D2001	Disco 2000	—	—	—	—	—	—	—	—	—	—	—		Singles only
1987	"Down Town": JAMS 27 / JAMS 27T	The Justified Ancients of Mu Mu	—	5	—	—	—	—	—	—	—	—	—		Singles only
1988	"Burn the Bastards" / "Burn the Beat" (Note: According to the label of "Burn The Bastards", "this is a transition record" between The JAMs and The KLF.): JAMS 26T / KLF 002T	The KLF (Note: "Burn the Beat" was the name of an instrumental remix of "Burn the Bastards" and also the name of a separate single containing remixes of the song. The singles are credited to The KLF, but the original recording is taken from the Justified Ancients of Mu Mu album Who Killed The JAMs?. For more information see Burn the Bastards.)	—	15	—	—	—	—	—	—	—	—	—		Who Killed The JAMs?
1988	"One Love Nation": D 2002	Disco 2000	—	—	—	—	—	—	—	—	—	—	—		Singles only
1988	"Doctorin' the Tardis": KLF 003 / KLF 003P / KLF 003T / KLF 003R	The Timelords	1	1	2	—	4	25	10	—	—	66	16		Singles only
1988	"What Time Is Love? (Pure Trance Original)": KLF 004T [Pure Trance 1]	The KLF	—	—	—	—	—	—	—	—	—	—	—		The White Room (Original Motion Picture Soundtrack)
1989	"Uptight (Everything's Alright)": D 2003 / D 2003T	Disco 2000	—	—	—	—	—	—	—	—	—	—	—		Single Only
1989	"3 a.m. Eternal (Pure Trance Original)": KLF 005T [Pure Trance 2]	The KLF	—	—	—	—	—	—	—	—	—	—	—		The White Room (Original Motion Picture Soundtrack)
1989	"What Time Is Love? (Pure Trance Mixes)": KLF 004R	The KLF	—	—	—	—	—	—	—	—	—	—	—		Single Only
1989	"Kylie Said to Jason": KLF 010	The KLF	—	6	—	—	—	—	—	—	—	—	—		The White Room (Original Motion Picture Soundtrack)
1989	"3 a.m. Eternal (Pure Trance Mixes)": KLF 005R	The KLF	—	—	—	—	—	—	—	—	—	—	—		Singles Only
1989	"What Time Is Love? (Power Remix)": GIG 666 214 / GIG 111 214 / GIG 9031-72897-2	The KLF	—	—	—	—	—	—	—	—	—	—	—		Singles Only
1990	"Last Train to Trancentral (Pure Trance Mixes)": KLF 008R (Note: Pure Trance 3 ("Love Trance"), 4 ("Turn Up the Strobe"), and the original Pure Trance 5 ("E-Train to Trancentral") were not released, although sleeves and labels were printed. "E-Train to Trancentral" and "Last Train to Trancentral (Pure Trance Original)" may be alternate names for the same recording.)	The KLF	—	—	—	—	—	—	—	—	—	—	—		Singles Only
1990	"What Time Is Love? (Live at Trancentral)": KLF 004 / KLF 004C / KLF 004X / KLF 004CD	The KLF	5	—	73	23	—	15	—	14	23	—	13		The White Room
1990	"What Time Is Love? (Remodelled & Remixed)": KLF 004Y	The KLF	—	—	—	—	—	—	—	—	—	—	—		Singles Only
1990	"It's Grim Up North (Original Club Mix)": JAMS 28T	The KLF	—	—	—	—	—	—	—	—	—	—	—		Singles Only
1991	"3 a.m. Eternal (Live at the S.S.L.)": KLF 005 / KLF 005C / KLF 005X / KLF 005CD	The KLF	1	—	3	7	—	5	5	2	4	5	1	UK: Silver; AUS: Gold; US: Gold	The White Room
1991	"3 a.m. Eternal (The Moody Boys Selection)": KLF 005Y	The KLF	—	—	—	—	—	—	—	—	—	—	—		Single Only
1991	"Make It Rain / No More Tears": KLF LP PROMO 1	The KLF	—	—	—	—	—	—	—	—	—	—	—		The White Room
1991	"Last Train to Trancentral (Live from the Lost Continent)": KLF 008	The KLF	2	—	5	6	—	1	4	5	6	—	17	AUS: Gold	The White Room (US Release)
1991	"Last Train to Trancentral (Meets The Moody Boys Uptown)": KLF 008Y	The KLF	—	—	—	—	—	—	—	—	—	—	—		Singles only
1991	"America: What Time Is Love?": KLF USA 4 / KLF USA 4C / KLF USA 4X / KLF USA 4CD	The KLF	4	—	40	3	4	4	2	6	3	57	10		Singles only
1991	"It's Grim Up North": JAMS 28 / JAMS 28C / JAMS 28R / JAMS 28CD	The Justified Ancients of Mu Mu	10	—	136	—	—	—	—	—	26	—	—		Singles only
1991	"Justified and Ancient": KLF 099 / KLF 099C / KLF 099X / KLF 099CD	The KLF (featuring Tammy Wynette)	2	—	3	1	4	2	3	1	2	11	2	UK: Silver; AUS: Gold	The White Room (USA)
1992	"3 a.m. Eternal (Top of The Pops)" (Note: Limited edition, mail order-only release.): KLF 5TOTP	The KLF with Extreme Noise Terror	—	—	—	—	—	—	—	—	—	—	—		Singles only
1993	"K Cera Cera (War Is Over If You Want It)" (Note: Released as a limited edition single in Israel and Palestine in November 1993.): KCC1-2 / KCC1-4	The K Foundation presents The Red Army Choir	—	—	—	—	—	—	—	—	—	—	—		Singles only
1997	"Fuck the Millennium": BFFP 146K / BFFP 146T / BFFP 146CDK	2K (featuring Acid Brass)	28	—	—	—	—	—	—	29	—	—	—		Singles only
2017	"2023: A Record"	The Justified Ancients of Mu Mu	—	—	—	—	—	—	—	—	—	—	—		Singles only
"—" denotes that the release did not chart

== Remixes and production work ==
The following tracks were remixed by The KLF:

Year	Original artist	Song	Remix
1990	Depeche Mode	"Policy of Truth"	"Trancentral Mix"
1990	Pet Shop Boys	"So Hard"	"The KLF vs Pet Shop Boys"
1990	Pet Shop Boys	"It Must Be Obvious"	"UFO Mix"
1991	Moody Boys	"What Is Dub?"	"Kings of Low Frequency Dub Version"
1991	Moody Boys	"Dub Is What?"	

In 1989, as The Justified Ancients of Mu Mu, the duo produced the Moody Boys' single "First National Rapper" and its B-side, "Funky Zulu".

== Compilation appearances ==
The following tracks and remixes were made available only on Various Artists compilation albums. Compilation appearances by tracks which were also released on an album or single are not included. Mixes for DJs and megamixes are also excluded.

Year	Artist	Song	Compilation Album
1989	Discotec 2000	"Feel This"	Eternity Project One
1990	The KLF	"Build a Fire (Lenny Dee Remix)" (Note: A remix of a track from the original The White Room album.)	Energy - DJ's In The House
1991	The KLF	"What Time Was Love" (Note: A short re-modelling of What Time Is Love? that bears little relation to the original track; in the words of Peter Robinson, an "explosion, followed by 99 seconds of post-nuclear rumbling".)	Give Peace A Dance: A CND Compilation
1995	One World Orchestra	"The Magnificent"	The Help Album

== Films ==
=== The KLF ===
All titles credited to The KLF and released on VHS video.

Year	Title	Notes
1990	Waiting	KLF VT007. Ambient house film with an original soundtrack.
1991	The Stadium House Trilogy	Picture Music International. Video performances of "3 a.m. Eternal", "Last Train to Trancentral", and "What Time Is Love?"; and a new instrumental piece, "This Is Not What The KLF Is About".

=== K Foundation ===
The following K Foundation films have all had public screenings, but have not been released on any home video format.

Year	Title	Notes
1994	Watch the K Foundation Burn a Million Quid	55 minutes of footage showing the K Foundation (Cauty and Drummond) burning one million pounds. Premiered on 23 August 1995 on the island of Jura.
1995	Pissing in the Wind	Footage of Drummond, Cauty and Mark Hawker urinating into the wind. Shot on 3 November 1995 and premiered at Glasgow University on the same day.
1997	This Brick	4 minutes of a still picture of a brick made from the ashes of the million pounds incinerated by the K Foundation. Premiered at the Barbican Hall, London on 17 September 1997.

== Books ==
Year	Authors	Title	Publisher	ISBN
1988	Jimmy Cauty; Bill Drummond	The Manual (How to Have a Number One the Easy Way)	KLF Publications	ISBN 0-86359-616-9
2017	Jimmy Cauty; Bill Drummond	2023: A Trilogy	Faber & Faber	ISBN 9780571342242

== Unreleased ==
The following KLF projects were announced but not released. Some of these, but by no means all, circulate as bootleg recordings/videos; some may not have been recorded at all. (Note: The following unreleased singles are not listed: "Make It Rain" and "No More Tears", which feature on The White Room. "Go To Sleep" was never scheduled, and featured on the scrapped White Room album. The "Club Mix" of "Madrugada Eterna" was released on a very limited edition white label; alternate mixes were released on Chill Out and "Kylie Said to Jason". The club mix of "It's Grim Up North" (promo only). The Pure Trance LP is excluded because of insufficient sources; it was likely either disc 2 of Shag Times (sometimes called Towards the Trance) or a compilation of the not-completed "Pure Trance" series of singles.)

Year	Format	Project	Notes
1988	Flexidisc	Deep Shit (Part 1)	Given catalogue number DS 1. KLF Communications Information Sheet 8 (1990) claimed that 500 copies had been pressed but had "never been deemed safe to release".
1988	Graphic Novel	Deep Shit (The Further Adventures Of The Justified Ancients Of Mu Mu)	A comic book or graphic novel drawn by Cauty (with words by Drummond) was mentioned in NME and The Face and various KLF Information Sheets. Originally scheduled for sometime in 1989, later said in KLF Info Sheet 4 (1989) that it has been pushed to 1990 before cancellation. Jimmy allegedly thought it was crap and threw it out. Some frames later re-appeared in the Advanced Acoustic Armaments Cook Book.
1988	Single	Love Trance (Pure Trance 3)	KLF 006T / KLF 006R. Sleeves and labels printed. Scheduled for 14 November 1988
1988	Single	Turn Up The Strobe (Pure Trance 4)	KLF 007T / KLF 007R. Sleeves printed. Scheduled for 28 November 1988.
1988	Single	The Lover's Side (Pure Trance 5)	KLF 008T / KLF 008R. Scheduled for 12 December 1988 (Later dropped in favour of E-Train to Trancentral) This song also featured on the unreleased version of the album The White Room (see below).
1988	Single	E-Train To Trancentral (Pure Trance 5)	KLF 008T. Sleeves and labels printed. Scheduled for 12 December 1988
1989	Single/EP	Burn The Bastards (EP Remixes)	JAMS 26R. House Remixes by The KLF.
1989	Single	What Time Is Love? (The Monster Attack Mix)	KLF 004M. Scheduled for 1989. 4 Copies reported to exist.
1989	Single	No More Tears	KLF 011G / KLF 011IT / KLF 011R / KLF 011CD / KLF 011C. Single for the forthcoming The White Room film/album (see above.) Announced as a Christmas Single in KLF Info Sheet 4 (1989)
1989	Single	Go To Sleep	KLF 008T Later re-named to KLF 012T / KLF 012R. Single for the upcoming The White Room. Scheduled for 1989.
1989	Album	The White Room - Original Motion Picture Soundtrack	JAMS LP4 / JAMS CD4 / JAMS MC4 / JAMS DAT4. Very different from the White Room album eventually released, this widely bootlegged recording was scrapped after the commercial failure of the single "Kylie Said to Jason".
1989	Film	The White Room	KLF VT006. The KLF's road movie. A rough version was completed in 1989, before The KLF decided to film an "Outer Film" to augment it. This was never completed. The "Inner Film" has been screened privately, and bootleg copies of it circulate. It was cancelled in 1990 due to the amount of money required to continue filming along with the commercial failure of "Kylie Said to Jason".
1989	Single	Deep Shit (Part 3)	KLF 010IT. Scheduled for September 1989. 6 copies reported to exist after pressing plant refused to press any further copies.
1989?	Album	Pure Trance / Live At Trancentral	According to Pete Robinson’s "Justified And Ancient History", there were plans to remix the above as an album called “Pure Trance” (KLF LP1) and then further as “Live At Trancentral”.
1990	Single	Madrugada Eterna	KLF ETERNA 1. Scheduled for March 1990. Reported 20 copies exist. Contains the "Madrugada Eterna (303 Edit)" used in The White Room Promotional Films. The "Club Mix" from this Single later re-appeared in The White Room (1989 Director's Cut).
1990?	Remix	It's Grim Up North (Unnamed Orb Remix)	KLF 014T. - Promo white label apparently exists.
1991	Promotional Single	"America: What Time Is January?"	KLF 92 PROMO 2. Unreleased remix of "America: What Time Is Love?" Small amounts of single sided promos were pressed on black and clear vinyl.
1992	Album	The Black Room	The KLF started work on a final album, but it remains unfinished and unissued. Announced in Japan as "Toshiba/EMI TOCP-7185"
1992	Film	The Rites of Mu	Promotional VHS only; KLF VT014. "Documentary" filmed on the island of Jura. Premiered in America, 21 May 1991. Aired on MTV Europe, 24 June 1992. However, never officially released.
1992	Compilation Album	Mu (Revised Edition)	Cancelled due to KLF leaving the music business. Originally planned to have 4 new tracks including new "The White Room".
1993	Unknown	Unnamed Bill Drummond and Ian McCulloch Collaboration	
1997	Album	Last Train	Catalogue umber "JAMS LP010" - Allegedly posted for pre-order on HMV's website.
2021	Compilation	Kick Out D'JAMs	Chapter 1 of "Samplecity Thru Trancentral"
2021	Compilation	Pure Trance Series	Chapter 2 of "Samplecity Thru Trancentral"
2021	Compilation	Moody Boys Selected	Chapter 4 of "Samplecity Thru Trancentral"
Unknown Year	Book	Zenarchy - A Case History	KLF 013B - A book by Bill Drummond.

== Master Tapes ==
Year	Format	Project	Notes
1987	Studio DAT	Whitney Joins The JAMs	Confirmed to exist. 2 Variants exist, "Demo Mix 1" (7:19) and "Demo Mix 2" (5:51). Later released by Positive Void Communications sometime around 2013. (Allegedly rescued from a skip Jimmy Cauty was using.)
1987	Studio Master Cassette	Who Killed The JAMs?	Studio Master Cassette containing early versions of tracks such as "Clean Up Men", "The Cage" and "King Boy's Rap".
1988	Studio Master Tape	Doctorin' The Tardis	Several versions exist. One known as "Doctor Who" (7" and 12"), "Doctorin' The Tardis (Newest Edit)" and "Gary In The Tardis".
1988	?	The Lover's Side	12" Master version of The Lover's Side (Possibly KLF 008T.)
1989	?	Leave This Party (Radio Mix)	Early version of "Kylie Said to Jason" from 1989.
1989	?	Kylie Said to Jason (Edits)	Contains 7" Edited Master and Radio Edit Master.
1989	?	Kylie Said to Jason	7" and 12" Master Tapes from 4 August 1989.
1989	?	The White Room (OST) (Un-Edited)	Contains early versions of The White Room (OST). Contains only 8 Tracks.
1989	?	The White Room (OST)	Contains final version of The White Room (OST). Contains 10 tracks.
1990	Master Cassette	What Time Is Love? (2nd Remix)	A master cassette of various unreleased mixes such as "Extended Primal Mix", "Extended Techno Slam Mix", "70 Foot Monster Attack Mix" as well as the Pure Trance Mix 1 and 2 (labelled "Original Mix" and "Sub Bass Acid Mix")
1990	Master Cassette	What Time Is Love?	4 new unseen mixes included such as "KWS Mix", "KWS No Rap", "16 Bar Edit" and "BKWDS Edit". Cassette datted 12 April 1990.
1990	Master Cassette	What Time Is Love?	Contains Live At Trancentral 7" and 12" Edits as well as the "Unfinished Edit". Dated 22 May 1990.
1990	Master Cassette	3AM Eternal	Contains 7" Radio Edit Demo. Dated 28 October 1990 A second tape from the same day contains the 12" Demo. A third tape contained the "TOTP Edit".
1990	Master Cassette	3AM Eternal	Contains multiple demos such as "7" Live @ The S.S.L", "7" Guns of Mu Mu" (as well as 12" Versions.) Dated October 1990.
1990/91	Master Cassette	3AM Eternal (Mixes)	Contains 7 mixes labelled Mix 1-7. "Mix 3" is known as the "No Rap Edit", "Mix 4" is known as "The Anti-Acapella Edit" and "Mix 6" is the "Live At The S.S.L Demo"
1991	Studio Mixpass	Last Train to Trancentral	Contains 7" Master Edit. Dated 15 February 1991.
1991	?	Justified and Ancient	Contains a mix known online as the "Ice Cream Men Edit" - Labelled as "Master Full Length Version". Dated 8 August 1991.
1991	?	Justified and Ancient	Contains "Edited Tammy Master". Dated 4 September 1991.
1991	Studio Cassette	3AM Eternal (KLF vs ENT)	Contains 3 versions "3AM Eternal (KLF vs ENT)", "3AM Eternal (No Bill Vox)" and "3AM Eternal (KLF vs ENT) (Instrumental)". Dated 12 December 1991
1992	Studio Demo	Make It Rain	Features "Make It Rain (7-2-92 Chords)". Dated 7 February 1992.
1992	Internal Demo	America: What Time Is Love?	Contains the same tracks as release "KLF USA 4CD". Dated 24 February 1992.
