= Shag Times =

Compilation album by The Justified Ancients of Mu Mu
- Released: 16 January 1989
- Recorded: Trancentral
- Genre: Electronica
- Length: 71:42
- Label: KLF Communications
- Producer: The JAMs

The Justified Ancients of Mu Mu chronology
Who Killed The JAMs? (1988)	Shag Times (1989)	The "What Time Is Love?" Story (1989)

Shag Times is a UK compilation and remix double album released in 1989 by The Justified Ancients of Mu Mu (The JAMs). The album also introduced Bill Drummond and Jimmy Cauty's new incarnation – and one which would become considerably more famous – The KLF.

== Context ==
The title of the album relates to the slogan "Shag Shag Shag", a lyric from The JAMs' 1987 debut single "All You Need Is Love" that also appeared as promotional billboard graffiti at the time of the single's release. The gatefold sleeve of the Shag Times vinyl double LP alludes to a newspaper, whose columns recount The JAMs' actions as reported in the music press, alongside reviews of their musical output.

Released in January 1989 (see 1989 in music), Shag Times includes a selection of The JAMs' singles and album tracks, followed by The Timelords' "Doctorin' the Tardis". The remainder of the album consists of tracks originally by The JAMs, The Timelords and Disco 2000, remixed by and credited to The KLF. These KLF remixes were produced in 1988 by Drummond and Cauty, with engineering by Ian Richardson and programming by Nick Coler. The compilation showcases The JAMs' characteristic sample-driven hip hop and bastard pop, and in equal measure it introduces the minimalistic house sound of The KLF that characterised their subsequent "Pure Trance" releases "What Time Is Love" and "3 a.m. Eternal".

Following Shag Times, The KLF became Drummond and Cauty's main vehicle; the only future release by The JAMs was the industrial techno single "It's Grim Up North".

== Reviews ==
Professional ratings
Review scores
Source	Rating
AllMusic	4/5 stars
Q	4/5 stars
Spin Alternative Record Guide	6/10
The Village Voice	B+

In a contemporary review for The Village Voice, music critic Robert Christgau said that the JAMs' music was "more interesting than compelling", but "the drum-machine cut-and-paste of these white rappers cum dance-music guerrillas definitely deserves its footnote in the annals of sampling ... Of enduring artistic originality and importance for sure". Q magazine said, in reference to Shag Times, that The JAMs had "...helped re-open the whole debate [about the laws of creative ownership] and, what often seems neglected in the furore, made a sequence of very amusing juxtapositions, of which The Timelords 'Doctorin' the Tardis' (included here) is the tamest. A great party album."

In a retrospective review, AllMusic claimed that Shag Times was "one of the many deliberate cash-ins released in the wake of the Timelords" but that it "confirmed Bill Drummond and Jimmy Cauty's supremacy over every last imitator and pop stunt plagiarist".

== Track listing ==
The following track listing is for the vinyl double LP UK release of Shag Times; the UK CD release featured the same tracks and running order but on one disc. Another CD of JAMSCD3 was issued in Switzerland, at some point between 1989 and 1992, and is identical to the UK release apart from "Made in Switzerland" written on the back sleeve above the barcode. This disc seems to be official, and is much sought after as it is the only copy of the CD not to be manufactured by P.D.O., and is therefore immune to the "bronzing" that has damaged so many early and rare KLF CDs.

Elsewhere in Europe, Shag Times was released on vinyl through Rough Trade, without the remix contributions of The KLF, and in the US, a similar compilation entitled The History of The JAMs (a.k.a. The Timelords) was released, also without the remixes, the CD version containing "Gary in the Tardis" as a bonus track. A final edition of The History of the JAMs was issued by the Possum Label in Australia, on cassette, CD and vinyl, and features a unique mix of "Burn the Bastards" (called Burn the Beat) as well as the only CD appearance of the track "Disaster Fund Collection" and an edit of "All You Need is Love".

Disc One: The Justified Ancients of Mu Mu

1. "All You Need Is Love (106 bpm)" – 5:01
2. "Don't Take Five (Take What You Want)" – 4:07
3. "Whitney Joins The JAMs" – 7:10
4. "Down Town" – 4:29
5. "Candyman" – 3:29
6. "Burn the Bastards" – 6:31
7. "Doctorin' the Tardis" – 3:26

Disc Two: The KLF

1. 114 BPM [Remix of "Whitney Joins The JAMs"] – 6:38
2. 90 BPM ["I Love Disco 2000"] – 5:30
3. 118 BPM [Remix of "Down Town"] – 6:28
4. 125 BPM ["Burn the Beat (Club Mix)"] – 4:56
5. 120 BPM ["Prestwich Prophet's Grin (Instrumental Remix)"] – 4:16
6. 118 BPM ["The Porpoise Song (Instrumental Remix)"] – 5:14
7. 120 BPM ["Doctorin' the Tardis (Minimal)"] – 4:27

The tracks on Disc Two are labelled (inaccurately) in terms of their beats per minute (BPM); the titles in square brackets above are those given to the same tracks where they occur elsewhere in the catalogue of KLF Communications (see The KLF discography).
