= All You Need Is Love (JAMs song) =

Song by the Justified Ancients of Mu Mu

Single by The JAMs

from the album 1987
- Released: 9 March 1987 (original white-label version); 18 May 1987 ("106bpm" version)
- Genre: Electronic; alternative hip-hop
- Length: 5:02 (original white-label version); 4:56 ("106bpm" version)
- Label: The Sound of Mu(sic); (KLF Communications)
- Songwriters: Jimmy Cauty; Bill Drummond
- Producers: Rockman Rock (Cauty); King Boy Hard Drummond; (The Justified Ancients of Mu Mu)

Drummond and Cauty singles chronology
"All You Need Is Love" (1987)	"Whitney Joins The JAMs" (1987)

"All You Need Is Love" is a song by the Justified Ancients of Mu Mu (the JAMs), independently released as their debut single on 9 March 1987. A politically topical song concerning the British media's AIDS furore, the track was initially given a 12" white label release because of its sampling of other records.

"All You Need Is Love" epitomised the artistic attitude of the JAMs' subsequent recordings: making use of popular music by taking extensive samples of other artists' work, and juxtaposing these with each other, adding beatbox rhythms and Bill Drummond's Scottish-accented raps and narrations. The JAMs' promotional tactics were similarly unconventional, including the use of promotional graffiti, a guerrilla communication method which would be employed regularly by Drummond and Cauty throughout their career.

== Recording and release ==
Bill Drummond and Jimmy Cauty started working together early in 1987. They assumed alter egos—Kingboy D and Rockman Rock respectively—and adopted the name "the Justified Ancients of Mu Mu" (the JAMs), after the fictional conspiratorial group "The Justified Ancients of Mummu" from The Illuminatus! Trilogy. "All You Need Is Love" was their debut single.

Initially, the song was released as a limited edition one-sided white label promotional 12", on 9 March 1987, by the JAMs' own label The Sound Of Mu(sic). This version included a 15-second sample of the Beatles' "All You Need Is Love", as well as samples of the MC5's "Kick Out the Jams" and Samantha Fox's "Touch Me (I Want Your Body)". The song had been declined by distributors fearful of prosecution, but copies of the white label were sent to DJs and the music press. The identities of Drummond and Cauty were not made known to these recipients (Drummond was a music business veteran, and Cauty a former member of the unsuccessful band Brilliant). Underground Magazine speculated on this in March 1987: "The whole affair is mysterious, a telephone number only and a threat that the group will soon be releasing more material ... 'No, we've not been in bands before, and yes, I suppose we were originally influenced by the Beastie Boys to actually get up and do something ...' Too true, but these colonials seem a touch wiser, world weary a bit, but not angry ..." In the 28 March 1987 edition, NME revealed King Boy D's identity as Bill Drummond.

The JAMs re-edited the single in such a way that—they hoped—"brought [them] inside the "law" but still got up peoples noses", removing all but a snatch of The Beatles, replacing or doctoring the MC5 sample, and rerecording the Samantha Fox vocal. This new version—named "All You Need Is Love (106bpm)"—was released on 18 May 1987 as JAMS 23T, (Note: A piece in Sounds magazine dated 9 May 1987 and reprinted in the sleevenotes to Shag Times said the record would be in the shops on 8 May.) and was included on The JAMs debut album 1987 (What the Fuck Is Going On?). According to Drummond, the recording of 1987 was funded by the sales of "All You Need Is Love (106bpm)".

== Composition ==
"All You Need Is Love"
The opening portion of the original version, sampling The Beatles and MC5.

"All You Need Is Love (106bpm)"
The opening portion of the re-edited and re-released version, in which the offending samples were doctored or replaced.

The central theme of "All You Need Is Love" was the media coverage given to the AIDS crisis. The original version opens with a 15-second sample of The Beatles' "All You Need Is Love", followed by Rob Tyner's cry of "Kick out the Jams, motherfuckers!" from the MC5's album Kick Out the Jams. A simple beatbox rhythm begins, along with samples of John Hurt from a British public information film — entitled Don't Die of Ignorance — about the dangers of AIDS. The samples are taken out of context to create new phrasing: "sexual intercourse — no known cure". Bill Drummond performs a heavily accented Clydeside rap, beginning "We're back again, they never kicked us out, twenty thousand years of 'shout shout shout'", a reference to the fictional JAMs of The Illuminatus! Trilogy. Later, he raps: "With this killer virus who needs war? Immanentize the eschaton, I said shag shag shag some more!" "Immanentize the eschaton" is a reference to the opening line of Illuminatus!, referring to the end of the world, and "shag" is a British slang word for sexual intercourse.

Between verses, the rhythm is punctuated by samples of former glamour model Samantha Fox ("Touch me, touch me, I want to feel your body"), as well as a sample "Ancients of Mu Mu" (by The JAMs' associate rapper Chike) which recurred throughout the next ten years' work of Drummond and Cauty. Also heard is a rendition by children of "Ring a Ring o' Roses", rhythmic panting, and an original female vocal line concerning infant mortality. Sounds magazine said the deliberate placement of Fox's sexually provocative "Touch Me" alongside "Ring a Ring O'Roses" ("the nursery rhyme about the Plague") "highlights explicitly the depth of contradiction embedded in society's attitude towards death through sex". More succinctly, NME said: "'All You Need ...' is by everyone" (so many samples) "and about everything" (and a variety of thematic nuances).

Drummond has said he was inspired by the hip-hop and scratch he was hearing regularly on John Peel's BBC Radio 1 show, but looking back in 1991 he said "If you listen to it now, it sounds nothing like a hip hop record, you know, it sounds a lot more like British punk ... [a] punk version of a hip hop record, I suppose."

== Reviews ==
The original white label release of "All You Need Is Love" was made "single of the week" in Sounds magazine, who announced that The JAMs had "produced the first single to capture realistically the musical and social climate of 1987". Calling the result "a seething terror ridden pulp", Sounds elaborated: "How have [The JAMs] produced a record more powerful than Lydon/Bambaataa's "World Destruction" without laying a finger on a synthesiser or guitar? THEFT! By stealing all the various beats, noises and sounds they've wanted, and building it into their own stunning audio collage, [The JAMs] are making a direct assault on the way records are put together."

Underground magazine were also enthusiastic: "This month I'm pleased to say, what's really moving is entirely British. The best groove so far this year is from Scotland (Note: It was a common misconception early in The JAMs' career – before their identities were widely known – that they were a Scottish duo. In actuality, whilst Drummond is Scottish, Jimmy Cauty is an Englishman.) and it shows London and New York exactly how it should be done, a one-sided, one-track 12" (it doesn't need any dub or instrumentals). 'All You Need Is Love' by The Jamms is more than rife with a bit of The Beatles (with a dash of MC5 and Samantha Fox). It seems to be anti-AIDS, but as I know nothing about the band it could easily be a piss take. Either way this is a superb jam, if you can find it, buy it (it's so dodgily constructed in legal terms that no distributor info is given)."

In a July 1987 review of 1987 (What the Fuck Is Going On?), Q magazine recalled that the original release of "All You Need Is Love" "seemed an inspired moment of pure wildness. Here were Red Clydeside beatbox rappers pointing a finger at society, putting their record together from samples pirated directly from other people's recordings, while at the same time crossing almost all contemporary music tribal boundaries by including everyone from Samantha Fox to The MC5 among their victims." This was contrasted with 1987 which the reviewer felt was a "disappointment" with "too few ideas being spread too thin".

The re-release of "All You Need Is Love" rewarded The JAMs with further praise, including NME "single of the week", in which Danny Kelly thought that "its maverick requisition of the hip-hop idiom, its fanatical confrontation of copyright laws overrun by music's new technologies, its central subject matters and its termination with the year's most incisively searching question—'1987: what the f**k's going on?'—combine to make 'All You Need Is Love' a triumph of nowness over mere newness." (Sic). Reviewing 1987 later in the year, the same writer described "All You Need Is Love" as "mighty" but he was unable to hide his disappointment in the album as a whole: "is it the runaway juggernaut hyperbrill monster crack that the outriding 45 threatened? No."

A retrospective piece in The Guardian called "All You Need Is Love" a "jagged slice of agit-prop" and "shockingly effective", adding that "[the original] was a club hit (i.e. everybody danced to it though nobody bought it), and after being re-edited to avoid copyright restrictions, it reached number three in the Indie chart".

Future KLF collaborator Tony Thorpe recalled hearing "All You Need Is Love" on John Peel's show in the year of its release and being "outraged": "I’m like, Oh my God, some idiot has sampled the Beatles. And it’s all out of time. I was amazed that anybody could be so blatant."

== Promotion and themes ==
"All You Need Is Love" epitomised the artistic attitude of the JAMs' subsequent recordings: plagiarising popular music by taking extensive samples of other artists' work, and juxtaposing these with each other, adding beatbox rhythms and Drummond's Scottish-accented raps, poems and narrations. The albums 1987 and Who Killed The JAMs?, and the singles "All You Need Is Love", "Whitney Joins The JAMs" and "Down Town" all had small-scale production budgets and little mainstream popularity, yet their novel construction and The JAMs' provocative disregard for copyright gained the duo enduring media attention.

The JAMs' promotional tactics were similarly unconventional, including the use of promotional graffiti, a guerrilla communication method employed repeatedly by Drummond and Cauty, beginning around the time of their first releases. Some copies of the re-released single were supplied in a picture sleeve which showed The JAMs' "Shag Shag Shag" graffiti defacing a billboard (advertising the Today newspaper) that depicted police chief James Anderton. Anderton, a self-declared Christian, had courted controversy when he said "I see increasing evidence of people swirling about in a human cesspit of their own making… We must ask why homosexuals freely engage in sodomy and other obnoxious practices, knowing the dangers involved" (Note: Many a quotation compendium (such as Columbia University) mis-dates Anderton's words to December 1987. In fact his remarks were made in December 1986. See for example The Times (London), 12 December 1986, cited in Gabb, S., "What to do about AIDS", Libertarian Alliance pamphlet, ISBN 1-870614-30-5, 1989; or The Guardian, 18 December 1986, cited in Pembrey, G., "History of HIV & AIDS in the UK: 1981–1995", Avert.org. Retrieved 21 June 2006.) (Note: For another reference to this quotation and a general overview see: "The 1980s AIDS campaign", Panorama Article on the BBC website (accessed 26 April 2006)) As with much of The JAMs' graffiti, the potency of "Shag Shag Shag" was derived from the context it in which it was placed. Further graffiti followed, "JAMs" and "Shag Shag Shag" slogans defacing billboards and Government-funded AIDS warnings in London. The JAMs also made available "Shag Shag Shag" T-shirts which King Boy D told the NME were "selling like hot cakes". (Note: "Selling like hot cakes" is British slang meaning "selling very well indeed".) The JAMs later revisited the word "shag" when they named their early career retrospective compilation album Shag Times.

Drummond and Cauty's output as The JAMs and later The KLF extensively referenced The Illuminatus! Trilogy, and their debut recordings were no exception. The lyrical references in "All You Need Is Love" are complemented by the first of many iconographic and numerical allusions that soon came to characterise the duo's work. Their "pyramid blaster" logo—a pyramid with a ghetto blaster suspended in front—appeared for the first time on the re-released "All You Need Is Love". The "pyramid blaster" references the "All Seeing I" icon—an eye suspended before a pyramid—associated with The Illuminatus! Trilogy. The catalogue numbers of the single (JAMS 23, JAMS 23S, JAMS 23T) also reference Illuminatus!, in which the number 23 is a recurring element. The JAMs actively enshrouded themselves with the mythology of the conspiratorial Illuminatus!, and by adopting the subversive attitude of the fictional JAMs they quickly developed their own mythology.

== Formats and track listings ==
"All You Need Is Love" was originally released in the UK as a limited edition one-side promotional 12" on 9 March 1987. The UK re-release of 18 May 1987 consisted of a 7" and a 12" that were also limited editions, along with a widely available 12". The re-release included the tracks "Ivum Naya (Ibo Version)" (a version of "All You Need Is Love" with Chike on lead vocals), and "Rap, Rhyme and Scratch Yourself" (an instrumental version of the song, "a stripped down beatbox track for anybody to feel free to do what they want with" according to King Boy D). The 7" A-side was "All You Need Is Love (Me Ru Con Mix)", a traditional Vietnamese song "Me Ru Con" sung by Duy Khiem. (Note: Khiem is credited as "Zuy Khiem" on "1987: The JAMs 45 Edits" and "Z Khiem" on the "All You Need Is Love (Mẹ Ru Con Remix)" single, but later in the KLF's career the credits changed to "Duy Khiem".) The recording reappeared as "Me Ru Con" on The JAMs' 1987 (What the Fuck Is Going On?). The formats and track listings of "All You Need Is Love" are tabulated below:

Format (and countries)	Track number		
Format (and countries)	1	2	3
One-sided 12" white-label promo (UK) (limited edition of 500)	O		
7" single (UK) (limited edition of 1000)	M	I	
12" single (UK) (limited edition of 5000 in picture sleeve)	A	I	R
12" single (UK) (without picture sleeve)	A	I	R

Key

- O: "All You Need Is Love" (original mix) (5:02)
- A: "All You Need Is Love (106 bpm)" (4:56)
- M: "All You Need Is Love (Me Ru Con Mix)" (2:22)
- I: "Ivum Naya (Ibo Version)" (3:39)
- R: "Rap, Rhyme and Scratch Yourself" (4:46)
