= Disco 2000 =

Disco 2000 may refer to:

- "Disco 2000" (song), a song by Pulp
- Disco 2000 (band), a British pop band
- Disco 2000 (anthology), an anthology by Sarah Champion
