= Eternity Project One =

Compilation album
- Released: April 1989
- Genre: Acid house
- Label: Gee Street Records

Eternity Project One was a 1989 British compilation released by Gee Street Records. It was compiled by Martin Glover a.k.a. Youth, under the pseudonym "Eternity". The album featured the first recorded material by The Orb as well as tracks by several acid house artists of the late 1980s. Many of the tracks include production from Bass (Kris Weston), Rockman (Jimmy Cauty), and Eternity. Also featured is Robo-Bop, a joint venture between Jimmy Cauty and Kris Weston. The compilation was released on both CD (rereleased by Rough Trade Records) and vinyl.

== Track listing ==
1. Robo-Bop - Bang Me Baby (4:52)
2. Lyndsey Holloday - Feel The Love (5:33)
3. Splendid - Paco's Revenge (5:10)
4. STP Twentythree - Let Jimi Take Over (3:41)
5. Eternity - That's What I Want (4:09)
6. Mr. Love - Mr. Love (5:58)
7. Eternity - Ashram House (4:52)
8. Eternity - Sanctuary (5:10)
9. The Orb - Tripping On Sunshine (Live Mix) (3:50)
10. Discotec 2000 - Feel This (5:38)
11. The Orb - Borrowed Love (The KLF Slow The Beats) (6:01)
12. Splendid feat. Eternity - The Return Of Paco (3:43)

Citations

Notes

- Longmire, Ernie; et al. (2020) [1998]. "Discography: The KLF (including The JAMS, The Timelords, 2K etc.)". Archived from the original on 29 February 2020.
