= Down Town =

Single by The Justified Ancients of Mu Mu
- Released: 30 November 1987
- Genre: House
- Length: 7:23 ("118bpm" version)
- Label: KLF Communications (UK)
- Songwriters: Jimmy Cauty; Bill Drummond; Tony Hatch
- Producers: Bill Drummond; Jimmy Cauty

Drummond and Cauty singles chronology
"1987 (The JAMs 45 Edits)" (1987)	"Down Town" (1987)	"Burn the Bastards" (1988)

"Down Town" was a 1987 release by The Justified Ancients of Mu Mu (better known as The KLF). The song is gospel music driven by house music rhythms, incorporating a sample of Petula Clark's 1964 single "Downtown".

== Origins ==
In 1987, Bill Drummond and Jimmy Cauty formed The Justified Ancients of Mu Mu (The JAMs), and busily released provocatively sample-heavy electronic music with beatbox rhythms and Drummond's socially aware raps. Their debut single "All You Need Is Love" and album 1987 (What the Fuck Is Going On?) were both investigated by the Mechanical Copyright Protection Society, who ordered The JAMs to recall and destroy all unsold copies of 1987. A new single, "Whitney Joins The JAMs", followed, along with a satirically edited version of the album, 1987 (The JAMs 45 Edits), and the debut release from spinoff project Disco 2000, "I Gotta CD". By the time of the release of "Whitney Joins The JAMs", the duo's independent record label had been renamed KLF Communications, and in the coming year The Justified Ancients of Mu Mu would mutate into The KLF. In the meantime, "Down Town" was The JAMs' and KLF Communications' final release of 1987, a 7" and 12" single release of 30 November. It did not enter the UK Singles Chart, but made inroads into the UK independent chart.

In an interview with NME, Drummond and Cauty maintained that the record was originally intended to be sample-free, but, quoting the Book of Proverbs 26:11, Drummond admitted that "as a dog returneth to his vomit so a fool returneth to his folly". In addition to Petula Clark's "Downtown", "Down Town" used elements of the distinctive bassline to Harold Faltermeyer's 1984 # 1 single "Axel F". Indeed, the labels of the record claimed that: "All sounds on this recording have been captured by The KLF. In the name of Mu, we hereby liberate these sounds from all copyright restrictions, without prejudice". Although The JAMs sought permission from Tony Hatch, who wrote Clark's "Downtown", Drummond admitted in KLF Communications newsletter: "We were surprised to read in the papers that Pet Clarke [sic] had given her permission for us to sample her classic 'Downtown' on our record of the same name. When we attempted to contact her, at her Swiss home, to do just this thing, we didn't get further than her refusing to accept our transfer charge."

The inclusion of Petula Clark's "Downtown" was claimed by Drummond to be a striking coincidence:

One day I was in the studio and I just started humming the chorus of 'Downtown' over the intro. I thought 'That's funny I wonder what key it's in?' I dug out the record that night and found that it was in the same key. I took it into the studio the next day and found out that it was absolutely the same number of beats per minute (bpm)—118. Most pop songs are between 80 and 160 bpm so that's 80 times 12, so it was a one in 960 chance that it would be the right bpm and the right key, so we couldn't resist it.

"Down Town" was not included on either of The JAMs' albums, instead featuring on their 1988 compilation and remix album, Shag Times, along with an instrumental remix credited to The KLF.

== Composition ==
"Down Town"
A juxtaposing of ideas: Clark's awestruck ode to nightlife and the reverential gospel choir contrast with Drummond's reminder of urban decay.

"Down Town" is, like most of Drummond and Cauty's work of 1987, a social critique of Great Britain realised as house music. Its central theme is social exclusion, poverty and homelessness, in which snatches of Clark's "Downtown"—an awestruck ode to hedonistic city nightlife—are juxtaposed with raps by Drummond, wailing sirens and original choral gospel vocals full of Christmas optimism, provided by the London Community Gospel Choir. These disparate elements are held together by a beatbox rhythm, a bassline borrowed from "Axel F", and an accompaniment of piano and Hammond organ.

During one verse, Drummond raps: "Downtown, down and out, dying in the dead of night, with your Special Brew and your special view of a world that could be right". Joined by the gospel choir's refrain of "Glory!", Drummond continues "[Glory!] What glory? [Glory!] In a wine bar world? [Glory!] in a tenement block? [Glory!] OK, let's hear it!". In each chorus, the gospel choir sing of Jesus' birth. This juxtaposition of Christmas with urban homeless alcoholism was revisited by Drummond and Cauty's later arts project, the K Foundation, whose final act to date involved distributing thousands of cans of strong lager to London's homeless on Christmas Eve in 1995.

== Reviews ==
"Down Town" was, after "All You Need Is Love", the second of The JAMs' three 1987 singles to become NME "single of the week". The British music paper called it "One massive hell-hating holler of a song", and concluded: "[The JAMs] may not be the hippest, sanest or sweetest band to stalk the Earth this year but they're certainly the most imaginative ... [T]hey've fired a musical trail so shocking they couldn't have kept you more on your toes if they'd stuffed a handgrenade up your ass and sent you out to tap dance in a pair of stilettos".

The following week, NME journalist James Brown noted the accomplished dance music production of recent KLF Communications releases:

When I broadcasted ["Down Town"] throughout the NME offices last week everyone present from punk, to yuppie, to club basher, to Alexander O'Neal fan gathered round to ask what it was. The same reactions had greeted "Whitney Joins The JAMs" but none of the writers had gone off and ordered a copy immediately. Likewise the accessibility of [Disco 2000's] "I Gotta CD" can't go ignored. And although [The JAMs] only produced it, the surprising dance-awareness .. has come as a surprise to both the KLF and myself. If they were prepared to destroy their abstract political ideas the KLF could quite rapidly become something akin to Kingboy, Rockman, and Waterman.

However, Record Mirror did not approve of The JAMs' comparatively sample-free offering, calling "Down Town" "a creature tamed" and wondering "without outlaw credentials what's left?"

== Formats and track listings ==
7" single (UK)

1. "Down Town (118 BPM)" (edit) - 4:01
2. "Down Town" (voxless) - 5:55

12" single (UK)

1. "Down Town (118 BPM)" - 7:23
2. "Down Town" (voxless) - 5:55

12" single (UK) (one-sided white label, 500 pressed)

1. "Down Town" (voxless) - 5:55
