= Whitney Joins the JAMs =

Song by The Justified Ancients of Mu Mu

Single by The Justified Ancients of Mu Mu
- Released: 7 September 1987
- Genre: Funky house
- Length: 7:03
- Label: KLF Communications (UK)

Drummond and Cauty singles chronology
"All You Need Is Love" (1987)	"Whitney Joins The JAMs" (1987)	"1987 (The JAMs 45 Edits)" (1987)

"Whitney Joins the JAMs" is a song and 1987 single by the Justified Ancients of Mu Mu (The JAMs). The song, released on the JAMs' independent label KLF Communications, is built around plagiarised samples of Whitney Houston in which—thanks to studio technology—she "joins the JAMs".

"Whitney Joins the JAMs" was given a low-key, uncommercial release in the UK, as a one-sided 12" in a generic monochrome KLF Communications sleeve. The single did not enter the UK Singles Chart.

== Background ==
Early in 1987, Bill Drummond and Jimmy Cauty formed the Justified Ancients of Mu Mu (the JAMs), grafting plagiarised samples from the history of popular music with beatbox rhythms and Drummond's often political raps. The JAMs' small-budget debut single "All You Need Is Love" and album 1987 (What the Fuck Is Going On?) both attracted the attentions of the UK music press, who praised The JAMs' innovation and social commentary, and the Mechanical Copyright Protection Society, who demanded the immediate withdrawal and destruction of all copies of 1987 in response to an objection from ABBA.

Despite the potential legal and financial risks that their composition methods entailed, the JAMs next created "Whitney Joins the JAMs", a house mash-up built around samples of Whitney Houston, Isaac Hayes, Lalo Schifrin's Mission: Impossible theme tune, and (according to later sleevenotes) Westworld. The lyrical theme of the piece is the satirical false premise that Whitney Houston had been begged and persuaded to collaborate with the JAMs; Drummond's jubilant lyrics suggest that extensive sampling of Houston's 1987 #1 single "I Wanna Dance with Somebody (Who Loves Me)" is evidence of Houston's dedication to the project.

According to Drummond, the JAMs had originally planned to produce a house record around Isaac Hayes' "Theme from Shaft". However:

We booked the studio for five days.... I went around to the record shop near the studio to get hold of Shaft.... and in the window was ... a big cut-out of Whitney Houston.... I love that track, and I loved Whitney Houston then, and I just said 'Wow', and bought the album [Whitney].... We just played that track over and over again, and we just thought: ..."no point us making records when such fantastic records as this have been made". And that's how that track ... grew into a celebration of Whitney Houston.

— Bill Drummond

== Release ==
"Whitney Joins the JAMs" was given a low-key release in the UK, initially as a run of 500 one-sided 12-inch singles in generic monochrome KLF Communications sleeves. The vinyl labels contained only the title and "120 bpm". Two repressings followed in 1987, both having a test tone groove B-side, with copies supplied in either a generic KLF Communications sleeve or a plain black sleeve. The single did not enter the UK Singles Chart, but it reached #3 on the UK Independent Chart, prompting the UK television programme The Chart Show to request a music video. The JAMs obliged, hiring a video camera and getting a friend to film them driving to The Chart Show studio in Cauty's repainted Ford Galaxie American police car. According to Drummond, "When we got there, we took out the cassette, handed it in at the gate and said 'that's your video'! The next day it was on national TV. It cost us £19.96." The video was remembered in 1991 by NME, who thought that the KLF's VHS compilation The Stadium House Trilogy would have benefitted from the inclusion of the "pre-megastardom" video. The song features on neither of the JAMs' studio albums, but is included on the duo's 1988 compilation and remix album Shag Times, where co-authorship credit is given to composers of works sampled in the track. Shag Times also contains an instrumental remix of the song, credited to the KLF.

== Composition ==
The upbeat and apolitical tone of "Whitney Joins the JAMs" was similarly accented by Drummond and Cauty's subsequent work as the Timelords and the KLF. The song's self-referential nature—in this case concerning its own production—is also typical of much of the duo's output. The 7-minute song is progressive, funky house, and an early example of a mash-up. It opens with quiet synthesiser drones and cymbal percussion which are soon joined by the markedly louder Mission: Impossible theme. Drummond says "'Mission impossible' we were told, she'll never join the JAMs", a point answered by power chords sampled from Whitney's "I Wanna Dance with Somebody". Drummond then begs and pleads to Whitney for around ninety seconds before the first strains of her voice can be heard. Drummond sounds ecstatic, proclaiming "Whitney Houston joins the JAMs!" and "I'm yours!".

The song develops to sample full sections of Houston's chorus, alternating these with increasingly pronounced guitar work taken from Hayes' distinctive Shaft theme and portions of the Mission: Impossible theme complemented by piano work. Ultimately the track descends into an unrhythmic cacophony of samples.

== Reviews ==
NME noted that "Whitney Joins the JAMs" exhibited a slicker blending of samples than the duo's previous recordings, with the JAMs moving from "crash collision" to "the art of super selective theft". "Whitney" is a "disco gun-down that is so beat-packed it will keep your boogie box high and gasping for days.", the paper wrote. "If this doesn't prove to you that dance music is moving with more energy and vitality than traditional rock then nothing will." Comparing "Whitney Joins the JAMs" to the duo's two other singles of 1987, NME also recognised that the track is "a tale of simple sample fantasy", whereas the lyrics of "All You Need Is Love" and "Down Town", "question the inadequacies and inconsistencies of society".

AllMusic called "Whitney Joins the JAMs" "hilarious".

== Legacy ==
Ironically, Drummond claimed that in 1991 the KLF were offered the job of producing or remixing a new Whitney Houston album, as an inducement from the boss of her record label (Clive Davis of Arista Records) to sign with them. The KLF did not accept the offer, but nonetheless they signed to be distributed by Arista in the US. Drummond said, "They sent us a copy of her current album and said: '[are] there any tracks in this album you wanna redo? We'll send her over [to] do photo sessions with you. We'll have her with a KLF T-shirt on the next video.' We got the album: complete rubbish.... But the whole concept! And suddenly we're being offered Whitney on a plate.... 'My God!'"

Davis' offer reflected the upturn in Drummond and Cauty's fortunes brought about by their decision to produce commercial music as the Timelords and the KLF. Whereas the JAMs' recordings of 1987 were at the legal mercy of the artists sampled therein, Drummond and Cauty later became able to commission the services of established performers. The Timelords' "Gary Joins the JAMs" (a version of their UK #1 novelty single "Doctorin' the Tardis", which sampled Gary Glitter) featured new vocals by Glitter, and he also appeared with the duo on Top of the Pops. The KLF recorded Tammy Wynette's vocals on "Justified and Ancient", and "America: What Time Is Love?" featured Glenn Hughes, prompting other established vocalists to send requests for collaborations.

In 1995, Drummond and Cauty unsuccessfully attempted to recruit Robbie Williams to sing on a track they were donating to The Help Album; Williams was on holiday and unavailable. Drummond outlined their idea—which mirrors "Whitney Joins the JAMs"—in a chapter of his book 45 entitled "Robbie Joins the Jams": "Over a mug of tea Jimmy [Cauty] and I got it all worked out. We would record our version of 'The Magnificent Seven', renamed 'The Magnificent One', through Sunday night. Over the track I would beseech Robbie Williams to join The Jams, and then Robbie would in fact turn up at the studio in the early hours of Monday morning and make his creative contribution to the record." The track was ultimately recorded without Robbie Williams and titled "The Magnificent".
