= Stadium house =

Dance music genre

- Stylistic origins: UK rave culture, house, techno, Second Summer of Love
- Cultural origins: Early 1990s, United Kingdom

Stadium house is a genre of dance music which was most successful in the early 1990s. Acts such as the KLF and Utah Saints combined house music with other elements more typical in rock music, such as bombastic live shows and even guitarists, to add additional impact to their music and appearance, in order to fill large venues and drive audience participation, or convey a live atmosphere in their recordings. Artists in this genre typically made heavy use of samples, and frequently sampled crowd noise for use in their music.

The term was made popular by the KLF, who released a video collection called The Stadium House Trilogy covering three of their videos. KLF member Bill Drummond himself referred to Utah Saints as "the first true stadium house band".

Artists frequently classified in this genre include:

- The KLF
- Utah Saints
- Faithless
- The Prodigy
- Basement Jaxx
- Underworld
- The Chemical Brothers
- Orbital
- 2 Unlimited
