= Kylie Said to Jason =

1989 single by The KLF

- The sleeve of "Kylie Said to Jason", featuring a still from The White Room

Single by the KLF
- Released: 31 July 1989 (vinyl); 7 August 1989 (CD); September 1989 (remixes)
- Genre: Electropop
- Length: 7:04
- Label: KLF Communications (UK)
- Songwriters: Jimmy Cauty; Bill Drummond
- Producer: The KLF

Drummond and Cauty singles chronology
"3 a.m. Eternal (Pure Trance)" (1989)	"Kylie Said to Jason" (1989)	"Last Train to Trancentral (Pure Trance 5)" (1990)

Music video
- "Kylie Said to Jason" on YouTube

"Kylie Said to Jason" was a 1989 single by the KLF, referring to Kylie Minogue and Jason Donovan, then stars in the popular Australian TV soap opera Neighbours. Designed for chart success, the single nonetheless failed to enter the UK top 100.

== Background ==
In 1989, the KLF — Bill Drummond and Jimmy Cauty — embarked upon the creation of a road movie and soundtrack album, both titled The White Room, funded by the profits from their number one hit single, "Doctorin' the Tardis". The film project was fraught with difficulties and setbacks, including dwindling funds. Ultimately, neither the film nor its soundtrack would be formally released, but one track from the aborted album, "Kylie Said to Jason", saw commercial release.

"Kylie Said to Jason" was intended to be a top 10 record which the KLF were hoping could "rescue them from the jaws of bankruptcy". Instead, it flopped commercially, failing even to make the UK top 100 and forcing the entire film and soundtrack project to be put on hold. The release however did peak at number 6 on the UK Indie Singles Chart during August 1989.

== Composition ==
"Kylie Said to Jason" (sample) is an electropop record whose title and lyrics allude to Kylie Minogue and Jason Donovan ("Scott and Charlene"), then stars in the popular Australian TV soap opera Neighbours. The lyrics also feature references to Archie Bunker, Todd Terry, Australian pop culture icons Rolf Harris and Skippy the Bush Kangaroo, and BBC comedy programmes The Good Life and Some Mothers Do 'Ave 'Em.

Drummond and Cauty confessed that on "Kylie Said to Jason" they had worn "Pet Shop Boys infatuations brazenly on [their] sleeves". True to this claim, the lush synth chorus and house piano recalls several Pet Shop songs, while the rap vocal is reminiscent of such recordings as "West End Girls" and "Left to My Own Devices".

The CD single release of "Kylie Said To Jason" also premiered the track "Madrugada Eterna" which would later be a central piece on the KLF's ambient house album, Chill Out. "Madrugada Eterna" (meaning "eternal dawn" in Spanish) is an ambient piece, featuring pedal guitar played by Graham Lee, and samples a detailed news report of a fatal road accident from American radio.

== Reviews ==
Mentioning "Kylie Said to Jason" retrospectively, Q magazine called the song "supremely wry"; NME called it "Pet Shop Boys-lovely", and Record Mirror named it "Excellent".

== Formats and track listings ==
"Kylie Said to Jason" was first released in the UK by KLF Communications on 31 July 1989. The CD single was released on 7 August.

Given the poor sales of the recording, and the subsequent increase in interest in the KLF, the CD single of "Kylie Said to Jason" became a moderately valuable collector's item, a mint condition copy being worth £30 in 2000.

Format (and countries)	Track number				
	1	2	3	4	5
7" Vinyl: KLF 010 (UK)	KE	KTE			
12" Vinyl: KLF 010T/010P/PROMO2 (UK)	K	KT			
CD Single: KLF 010CD (UK)	KE	ME	KT		
"The Remixes" 12" Vinyl: KLF 010R (Export)	TKE	KIT	KSH		
"The Remixes" 2x12" Vinyl: KLF 010RR (UK)	TKE	KIT	KSH	KITE	KITER
VHS Video: KLFVT 010 (UK; promo)	KE				

Key

- K - "Kylie Said to Jason" (7:04)
- KE - "Kylie Said to Jason (edit)" (3:58-4:01)
- KIT - "Kylie In A Trance" (3:26)
- KITE - "Kylie In A Trance (extended)" (6:56)
- KITER - "Kylie In A Trance (remix)" (6:56)
- KSH - "Kylie Said Harder" (5:24)
- KT - "Kylie Said Trance" (5:58)
- KTE - "Kylie Said Trance (edit)" (3:56-3:58)
- ME - "Madrugada Eterna" (7:52)
- TKE - "Trance Kylie Express" (7:11)
