= Who Killed The JAMs? =

Studio album by The Justified Ancients of Mu Mu
- Released: 8 February 1988
- Recorded: 1987–88
- Studio: Trancentral
- Genre: Acid house; hip hop
- Length: 29:54
- Label: KLF Communications
- Producer: The JAMs

The Justified Ancients of Mu Mu chronology
1987 (What the Fuck Is Going On?) (1987)	Who Killed The JAMs? (1988)	Shag Times (1989)

Who Killed The JAMs? is the second studio album by The Justified Ancients of Mu Mu (The JAMs), and the final one under the JAMs moniker before renaming themselves The KLF. Similar in style to the preceding 1987 (What the Fuck Is Going On?), the album is a fusion of hip hop, drum machines and samples of a diversity of musical works, although in general the samples are more covertly integrated here than they are in 1987.

== Background ==
Early in 1987, Bill Drummond and Jimmy Cauty formed The Justified Ancients of Mu Mu and released their debut single, "All You Need Is Love". This was followed in June 1987 by their debut album, 1987 (What the Fuck Is Going On?), an "energetic ... [and] loopy dance album" but with "too few ideas being spread too thin". In October 1987, The JAMs destroyed most remaining copies of the album following a copyright complaint from ABBA and the Mechanical-Copyright Protection Society. The JAMs released several other singles that year and made regular appearances in the British music press.

In a December 1987 interview, Rockman Rock claimed that The JAMs' second album would be heavy metal... "We're gonna do heavy metal covers. We thought we'd do the whole of Deep Purple in Rock." King Boy D continued: "Before we ever did the '1987' LP, we were gonna do one called 'The Justified Ancients Of Mu Mu In Rock' and do all Deep Purple songs. Then we got all these reviews treating us seriously so we thought maybe we should do a bit more of this stuff." In actuality, the duo's second LP, Who Killed The JAMs?, was "more of this stuff" – a fusion of hip hop, drum machines and samples of a diversity of musical works, albeit with the samples generally more covertly integrated than on 1987. "It's like when you have a crap and you squeeze it out and think 'I'm never going to need another one'", they told Melody Maker when discussing plans for a second album, "Then half an hour later you're thinking that maybe you will".

The rear of Who Killed The JAMs?, showing unsold copies of 1987 (What the Fuck Is Going On?) on the bonfire. The same picture was used on the American compilation CD The History of The JAMs a.k.a. The Timelords.

Released in February 1988, the sleeve of Who Killed The JAMs? pictured Drummond and Cauty with Cauty's Ford Galaxie, later to become credited as the 'writer' of "Doctorin' the Tardis". In the foreground – and in a close-up shot on the reverse of the sleeve – was a bonfire of unsold copies of 1987 (What The Fuck Is Going On?), which The JAMs had been ordered to destroy following their copyright dispute with ABBA. The fire is referenced in the song "Burn The Bastards", and The JAMs' career story to date told in the song "Prestwich Prophet's Grin".

Upon release, the album was interpreted by sections of the music press to be The JAMs' last album, and, excepting the compilation Shag Times, it was. Most subsequent releases by Drummond and Cauty would be under their new moniker, The KLF. Drummond: "After all the notoriety we seemed to get on the rock papers news pages over the last year (something we began to feel more and more uncomfortable with) we are going to attempt to keep a low profile in 1988.... [although] we might put out a couple of 12" records under the name The K.L.F..... As far as sampling is concerned, I'm sure we will continue doing it and from time to time get into trouble because of it, but it has always been only a part of the process of how we put our records together and not the reason for them existing. We will carry on doing what we want to do, when we want to do it, our motivation, everything we see and hear."

== Reception ==
Professional ratings
Review scores
Source	Rating
AllMusic	3/5 stars
New Musical Express	7/10
Sounds	5/5 stars
Spin Alternative Record Guide	6/10

Melody Maker declared Who Killed The JAMs to be "divine nihilism", "an outward show of self-deception, irrationality and bankruptcy that worries and rejoices itself to death". Sounds thought the album "a masterpiece of pathos", referring to "hopeless bravado in the face of massed corporate opposition", and awarded the maximum five stars.

== Track listing ==
The track listing was not actually printed on the album sleeve because, according to Drummond, "to get the record out as fast as possible after we had finished recording it, we had to deliver the art work to the printers before Christmas at which time we didn't know what the tracks were to be called."

=== Side one ===
1. "The Candystore" – 3:07
2. "The Candyman" – 3:29
3. "Disaster Fund Collection" – 5:38
4. "King Boy's Dream" – 0:58

=== Side two ===
1. "The Porpoise Song" – 5:43
2. "Prestwich Prophet's Grin" – 5:01
3. "Burn the Bastards" – 5:58

== Sources ==
- Weisbard, Eric; Craig Marks (1995). Spin Alternative Record Guide. Vintage Books. ISBN 0-679-75574-8.
