= Disco 2000 (band) =

British pop band

- Origin: London, England
- Genre: Pop
- Years active: 1987–1989
- Label: KLF Communications
- Spinoff of: The KLF
- Past members: "Cress" (Cressida Cauty) "Mo" (June Montana) (Note: KLF Communications Info Sheets seem to suggest that Cress and Mo alone were Disco 2000, with Drummond and Jimmy Cauty involved as producers/musicians. The band was, however, considered to be at the very least an 'offshoot' of The KLF. On the other hand, a 1992 piece in Select listed Disco 2000 as an alias of The KLF.)

Disco 2000 was a British pop band, a side project of The KLF. Vocals were handled by Cress (Cressida Cauty, née Bowyer), then-wife of KLF co-founder Jimmy Cauty, and Mo, June Montana (former vocalist of Jimmy Cauty's previous band Brilliant). Between 1987 and 1989, Disco 2000 released three singles on the KLF Communications label, none of which entered the top 75 of the UK Singles Chart.

== History ==
In 1981, Cressida Bowyer and Jimmy Cauty performed in the band Angels 1–5. They later married. In 1987, Jimmy Cauty teamed up with Bill Drummond to form The Justified Ancients of Mu Mu (The JAMs)./ The duo established an independent record label, KLF Communications, as a means to release The JAMs' material, and, as a side project, they dabbled in pop music with 'Disco 2000', a group fronted and vocalised by "Cress" (Cressida Cauty) and "Mo". Disco 2000's debut single, the first of three, was "I Gotta CD", released on 30 October 1987. Neither this nor its follow-up "One Love Nation" (1988) entered the UK Singles Chart. A third single, "Uptight (Everything's Alright)" (1989) peaked at #86 in the UK chart. Music videos were filmed for "One Love Nation" and "Uptight". A track entitled "Feel This" was contributed by the group to the 1989 Eternity Project One LP, compiled by Martin Glover "(Eternity", better known as "Youth"), under the name 'Discotec 2000'.

Cressida and Jimmy Cauty later set up home in a squat that also housed the KLF Communications recording studio, Trancentral. As Drummond and Jimmy Cauty dedicated themselves to The KLF, Cressida took on an organisational role for KLF Communications, in addition to design and choreography work for The KLF, and her own work as an artist.

== Reviews ==
Reporting on a 1988 gig by Disco 2000, NME writer Barbara Ellen described Mo and Cress as "two raucous, wicked, hideously beautiful she-cats with diamonds for brains.... For men, Disco 2000 must be like sex without the draggy chat-up scenario, Mae West without the lard, Madonna staked out in a jacuzzi looking anything but helpless."

In November 1987, NME reviewer James Brown described Disco 2000's single "I Gotta CD" as "A captivating KLF offshoot from the Jamms' backing singers crammed with slogans, metal solos, Farley Jackmaster style pianos, and gorgeously rank clap-a-long choruses. Addictive." A few weeks later, he remarked on the "accessibility" and increasing "dance-awareness" of recent KLF Communications releases "I Gotta CD", "Whitney Joins The JAMs" and "Down Town".

In 2005, International DJ magazine ranked Disco 2000's "Uptight (Everything's Alright)"—a cover of Stevie Wonder's "Uptight"—amongst the twenty "worst cover versions in the history of dance music": "The KLF had some brilliant ideas, but forming their own girl group and covering this classic Stevie Wonder Motown stomper wasn't one of them. The resulting lurid day-glo fusion of Stock, Aitken and Waterman pop, edit-heavy '80s house and dodgy female rap was possibly one of the worst records in the history of the world." In contrast, a retrospective piece on the work of The KLF and related acts by Trouser Press magazine called "Uptight" "entertaining" and "like Bananarama on a rap tip".

== Discography ==
I Gotta CD
Artist: Disco 2000
Year: 30 October 1987
Catalogue Number: KLF Communications D 2000

One Love Nation
Artist: Disco 2000
Year: 4 April 1988
Catalogue Number: KLF Communications D 2002

Uptight (Everything's Alright)
Artist: Disco 2000
Year: 16 January 1989
Catalogue Number: KLF Communications D 2003

A cover of Stevie Wonder's "Uptight (Everything's Alright)"

Feel This

Artist: Discotec 2000
Year: 1989

Featured in "Project One" compilation by Eternity

=== Formats and track listings ===
Format (and countries)	Track number			
Format (and countries)	1	2	3	4
I Gotta CD
7" white-label promo single (UK) (limited edition of 500)	cd			
12" single (UK)	CD	L		
One Love Nation
12" single (UK)	o	O	OC	
Uptight (Everything's Alright)
7" single (UK, rest of European Community)	u	h		
12" single (UK, Germany, rest of European Community)	U	H		
CD single (European Community)	u	h	U	H

Key

cd – "I Gotta CD (7" edit)" (3:47)	OC – "One Love Nation (Club Mix)" (5:18)
CD – "I Gotta CD" (6:50)	u – "Uptight (Everything's Alright) (Banana 2000)" (3:40)
L – "I Love Disco 2000" (5:25)	U – "Uptight (Everything's Alright) (Discorama Mix)" (4:45)
o – "One Love Nation (Radio Edit)" (3:40)	h – "Mr Hotty Loves You (edit)" (4:28)
O – "One Love Nation (Full Length)" (6:09)	H – "Mr Hotty Loves You" (6:14)
