= The KLF films =

Band filmography

The KLF released three long form videos during their career - Waiting, The Rites of Mu, and The Stadium House Trilogy. They also worked on an ambitious road movie - The White Room - which not released contemporaneously.

The soundtrack of The White Room was remodelled and reworked in 1991 to create the album The White Room, and the soundtracks to Waiting and The Rites of Mu were released on a 1997 Bootleg CD release called Waiting for the Rights of Mu.

Some footage from The White Room was used in the 1989 music video for Kylie Said To Jason and the 1991 music videos for 3 a.m. Eternal and Justified & Ancient. The films The White Room and Waiting were produced by Bill Butt.

The films directed by Butt, including a version of The White Room were compiled in 23 Seconds to Eternity, which was released on home media in 2023.

== Videography ==
Title	Date	Length	Notes
All You Need Is Love (106bpm)	18 May 1987	3:18	
How to Use the 1987 Edits	October 1987	6:48	
Down Town	30 November 1987	3:12	
Doctorin' the Tardis	23 May 1988	2:23	(part of 23 Seconds to Eternity)
What Time Is Love? (Pure Trance 1)	17 October 1988	7:10	
Uptight (Everything's Alright)	16 January 1989	3:37	
Kylie Said To Jason	31 July 1989	4:23	(part of 23 Seconds to Eternity)
Madrugada Eterna (The White Room Promo)	1989	2:05	
The White Room	Scheduled for 1989	44:45	(part of 23 Seconds to Eternity)
What Time Is Love? (Live at Trancentral)	30 July 1990	3:54	(part of 23 Seconds to Eternity)
What Time Is Love? (Live at Trancentral)	30 July 1990	4:14	Rare Crop Circle Version
What Time Is Love? (Live at Trancentral)	September 1990	3:18	Rare Version 2 / TOTP Video Remix
Waiting	5 November 1990	42:40	
The White Room (1991 Version)	Scheduled for 1991		
3 a.m. Eternal (Live at The SSL)	7 January 1991	3:41	
Last Train to Trancentral (Live from the Lost Continent)	22 April 1991	3:42	
The Stadium House Trilogy	1 July 1991	15:23	(part of 23 Seconds to Eternity)
This Is Not What The KLF Are About	1 July 1991	15:05	Second part to Stadium House Trilogy.
It's Grim Up North	28 October 1991	4:02	(part of 23 Seconds to Eternity)
Justified & Ancient (Stand By The JAMs)]]	25 November 1991	3:49	(part of 23 Seconds to Eternity)
The Work	December 1991	45:00	
The Making of Justified and Ancient (Part 1)	1991?	15:09	
The Making of America: What Time Is Love? (Part 2)	1991?	13:49	
3 a.m Eternal (Christmas Top of the Pops) a.k.a. KLF vs ENT	January 1992	2:54	
America: What Time Is Love?	24 February 1992	4:47	(part of 23 Seconds to Eternity)
The Rites of Mu	(Premiered in USA 21 May 1991; Scheduled for 1992	29:21	(part of 23 Seconds to Eternity)
KRASH	Scheduled for 1992	4:23	(part of 23 Seconds to Eternity)
Fuck The Millennium (Live at The Barbican)	17 September 1997	27:01	
This Brick (Live at The Barbican)	1997	3:53	
K Cera Cera (Live at The Barbican)	1997	4:41	

Italics denote a music video release.

== See also ==
- Watch the K Foundation Burn a Million Quid
