= Burn the Bastards =

"Burn the Bastards/Burn the Beat"

Single by The KLF

from the album Who Killed The JAMs? by The Justified Ancients of Mu Mu
- Released: 5 March 1988 (Burn the Beat); 18 April 1988 (Burn the Bastards)
- Recorded: Trancentral
- Genre: House
- Length: 4:54 (Burn the Beat (Club Mix)); 4:07 (Burn the Bastards (LP edit))
- Label: KLF Communications (UK)
- Producers: Drummond; Cauty

Drummond and Cauty singles chronology
"Down Town" (1987)	"Burn the Bastards" / "Burn the Beat" (1988)	"Doctorin' the Tardis" (1988)

"Burn the Bastards" is a 1988 song by Bill Drummond and Jimmy Cauty as The Justified Ancients of Mu Mu (The JAMs), from their second, and final before changing names, album Who Killed The JAMs?. The "bastards" of the title are copies of The JAMs first album, 1987 (What the Fuck Is Going On?), which Drummond and Cauty burnt on a bonfire in a Swedish field after a copyright dispute with the Swedish pop group ABBA. The song (which is based upon Sly and the Family Stone's "Dance to the Music") was released as a single, along with a separate single of remixes titled "Burn the Beat". Both singles were credited to The KLF, marking a change of name and with it a change of musical genre, from The JAMs' sample-fuelled political hip-hop to The KLF's upbeat and uptempo house music.

== Conception ==
=== Background ===
Early in 1987, Jimmy Cauty and Bill Drummond formed a musical outfit, The Justified Ancients of Mu Mu (The JAMs), later to also be known as The Timelords and, more famously, The KLF. The JAMs deliberately invited controversy by spending a year producing incendiary electronic music that was built around plagiarised samples of other artists, underpinned by beatbox rhythms and political raps. The song "Burn the Bastards", which was the duo's final single in this mould, was inspired in part by the legal backlash of their provocative output.

Their debut album, 1987 (What the Fuck Is Going On?), had been investigated by the Mechanical-Copyright Protection Society, who in August 1987 ordered The JAMs to recall and destroy all unsold copies of 1987, for its illegal use of extensive samples from ABBA's "Dancing Queen". The JAMs journeyed to Sweden—with their unsold LPs and an NME journalist in tow—in an attempt to negotiate with ABBA. When this failed, The JAMs made a bonfire in the Swedish countryside and burnt the LPs. Back in the UK, they continued with their plagiaristic productions, which culminated with a second LP, Who Killed The JAMs?. Its sleeve depicts the 1987 bonfire, and it contains "Burn the Bastards", a sample-heavy celebration of the fire set to house music. Ritualistic burnings became a recurring aspect of Drummond and Cauty's work, including the burning of a 60-ft (18-m) wicker man during the 1991 summer solstice (The Rites of Mu), and, as the K Foundation in 1995, their burning of £1 million.

=== Release ===
On 7 March 1988, Drummond and Cauty released The KLF's debut single "Burn the Beat", an instrumental house music version of "Burn the Bastards", on their own KLF Communications label. The single also featured instrumental remixes of other tracks from Who Killed The JAMs?. All 5,000 pressed copies of the single—catalogue number JAMS 26T—were exported. On 18 April 1988, another single, "Burn the Bastards", was released in the UK, to fill the hitherto overlooked catalogue number KLF 002. This single, also by The KLF, featured the LP version of "Burn the Bastards" alongside another instrumental version, "Burn the Beat (Club Mix)". The single releases marked a change in direction of Drummond and Cauty's music, to an upbeat and uptempo house music tone. Indeed, the printed label of "Burn the Bastards" stated, "This is a transition record". Neither "Burn the Bastards" nor "Burn the Beat" entered the UK Singles Chart, although the release peaked at number 15 in the UK Indie Singles Chart.

== Composition ==
"Burn the Bastards"
Drummond sings "Throw them on, and watch the bastards burn", accompanied by the "Mu Mu!" sample. The Jackson Five and Michael Jackson's "Bad" are used extensively.

"Burn the Bastards" is a celebratory house music song based upon Sly Stone's "Dance to the Music": a trumpet break and drum line are sampled, and the lyrical structure of that song is also mirrored. Whereas "Dance to the Music" vocally introduces the instruments used, so "Burn the Bastards" has Drummond sing of The JAMs' methods, such as "All we need is a beatbox, for people who only need a beat". The choral line "Dance to the music" is modified to "JAMs have a party".

Referring to the fate of the 1987 LPs, Drummond sings "Build a fire, stoke it good, throw them on, and watch the bastards burn", accompanied by a stark, ring modulated chorus, "Mu Mu!". A later portion of the lyrics alludes to New Year's Eve 1987: "Five to twelve, almost gone. 1987, what the fuck have we done?".

A driving 4/4 rhythm and a sampled Roland TB-303 loop provide acid house overtones. These elements are brought further to the fore in "Burn the Beat", which dispenses with Drummond's vocals.

Most of The KLF's work was highly self-referential: lyrics were usually enigmatic narratives of The KLF's real and fictional exploits, and vocal samples were re-used in a variety of musical contexts. The signatory "Mu Mu!" refrain, which first appeared on this song, recurred throughout the duo's music, including "What Time Is Love? (Live at Trancentral)" (1990), "Last Train to Trancentral (Live from the Lost Continent)" and "America: What Time Is Love?" (1991), and "Fuck the Millennium" (1997).

== Reviews ==
Announcing a change of name in January 1988, Bill Drummond had said "We might put out a couple of 12" records under the name The K.L.F., these will be rap free just pure dance music, so don't expect to see them reviewed in the music papers". As predicted, "Burn the Beat" and "Burn the Bastards" attracted little attention from the music press.

Reviewing Who Killed The JAMs?, Sounds described "Burn the Bastards" as "a JAMs manifesto" which "assumes a sinister edge alongside the pile of blazing copies of 1987 pictured on the sleeve", citing the track as evidence that The JAMs were "defiant, outspoken, still a wily step ahead".

== Formats and track listings ==
"Burn the Beat" was originally a KLF Communications 12" limited to 5,000 copies exported from the UK. In 1989, it was released in the US by TVT Records. "Burn the Bastards" was released by KLF Communications for a UK audience.

Format (and countries)	Track number			
Format (and countries)	1	2	3	4
Burn the Beat
12" single (UK, KLF Communications JAMS 26T)	J	M	G	P
7" single (US, released 1989)	J2	P		
12" single (US, released 1989)	J	M	C	L
Burn the Bastards
12" single (UK, KLF Communications KLF 002T)	J	C		

Key

- L - "Burn the Bastards" (LP version) (6:28)
- J - "Burn the Bastards (JAMs Have A Party / LP edit)" (4:11)
- J2 - "Burn The Bastards" (censored LP edit / 7" edit) (3:52)
- C - "Burn the Beat (Club Mix)" (4:51)
- M - "Burn the Beat (Mu Mu Mix)" (4:43)
- P - "The Porpoise Song (Instrumental Remix)" (5:09)
- G - "Prestwich Prophet's Grin (Instrumental Remix)" (4:14)
