= The KLF =

British electronic music duo

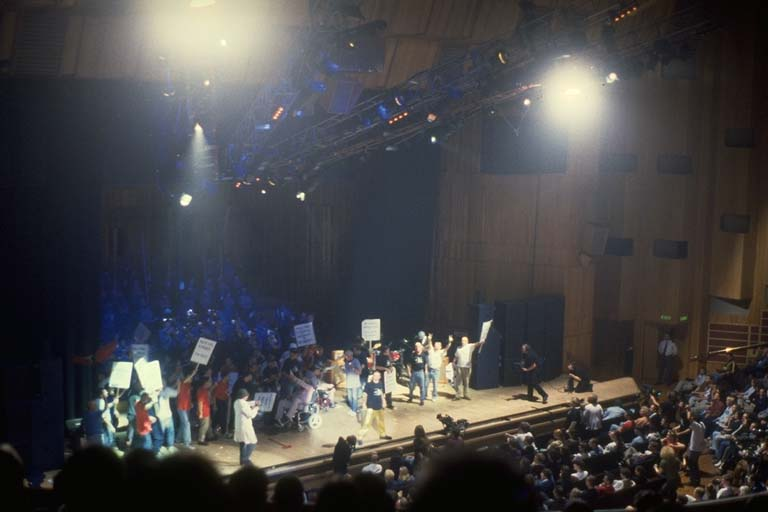
- 2K's 23-minute performance at the Barbican Arts Centre, London, on 2 September 1997

Background information
- Also known as: The Justified Ancients of Mu Mu; The JAMs; The Timelords; K Foundation; 2K; K2 Plant Hire
- Origin: Liverpool and London, UK
- Genres: Electronic; house; ambient; dance; eurodance; stadium house; avant-garde; alternative dance
- Works: The KLF discography
- Years active: 1987–1992; 1993–1995; 1997; 2017–present
- Labels: KLF Communications; Arista/BMG; Deutsche Grammophon/Universal Classics; Wax Trax!/TVT
- Members: Bill Drummond; Jimmy Cauty

The KLF (Note: KLF has been reported as being an initialism for "Kopyright Liberation Front", Sleevenotes from 1991 said that Cauty and Drummond have "yet to find out what K.L.F. stands for". or "Kings of the Low Frequencies".) (also known as the Justified Ancients of Mu Mu, furthermore known as the JAMs, the Timelords and other names) are a British electronic band who originated in Liverpool and London in the late 1980s. Scottish musician Bill Drummond (alias King Boy D) and English musician Jimmy Cauty (alias Rockman Rock) began by releasing hip hop-inspired and sample-heavy records as the JAMs. As the Timelords, they recorded the UK Singles Chart number-one single "Doctorin' the Tardis", and documented the process of making a hit record in a book The Manual (How to Have a Number One the Easy Way). As the KLF, Drummond and Cauty pioneered stadium house (rave music with a pop-rock production and sampled crowd noise) and, with their 1990 LP Chill Out, the ambient house genre. The KLF released a series of international hits on their own KLF Communications record label and became the biggest selling singles act in the world in 1991.

The KLF adopted the philosophy espoused by esoteric novels The Illuminatus! Trilogy, making anarchic situationist manifestations, including the defacement of billboard adverts, the posting of cryptic advertisements in New Musical Express (NME) and the mainstream press, as well as unusual performances on Top of the Pops. In collaboration with Extreme Noise Terror at the BRIT Awards in February 1992, they fired machine gun blanks into the audience and dumped a dead sheep at the aftershow party. This performance announced the KLF's departure from the music business and, in May of that year, they deleted their back-catalogue. Drummond and Cauty established the K Foundation and sought to subvert the art world, staging an alternative art award for the Worst Artist of the Year, and burning one million pounds sterling (approximately £2.35m or €2.75m as of 2022).

The duo have released a small number of new tracks since 1992, as the K Foundation, the One World Orchestra, and in 1997, as 2K. Drummond and Cauty reappeared in 2017 as the Justified Ancients of Mu Mu, releasing the novel 2023, and rebooting an earlier campaign to build a "People's Pyramid". In January 2021, the band began uploading their deleted catalogue onto streaming services, in compilations.

== History ==
=== Background ===
Bill Drummond was an established figure within the British music industry, having co-founded Zoo Records, played guitar in the Liverpool band Big in Japan, and worked as manager of Echo & the Bunnymen and the Teardrop Explodes. Artist and musician Jimmy Cauty was the guitarist in the three-piece Brilliant – an act that Drummond had signed to WEA Records and managed.

In July 1986, Drummond resigned from his position as an A&R man at record label WEA, citing that he was nearly 33⅓ years old (33⅓ revolutions per minute being the speed at which a vinyl LP revolves), and that it was "time for a revolution in my life. There is a mountain to climb the hard way, and I want to see the world from the top". In the same year he released a solo LP, The Man. Drummond intended to focus on writing books once The Man had been issued but, as he recalled in 1990, "That only lasted three months, until I had an[other] idea for a record and got dragged back into it all". Recalling that moment in a later interview, Drummond said that the plan came to him in an instant: he would form a hip-hop band with former colleague Cauty, and they would be called the Justified Ancients of Mu Mu:

It was New Year's Day... 1987. I was at home with my parents, I was going for a walk in the morning, it was, like, bright blue sky, and I thought "I'm going to make a hip-hop record. Who can I make a hip-hop record with?". I wasn't brave enough to go and do it myself, 'cause, although I can play the guitar, and I can knock out a few things on the piano, I knew nothing, personally, about the technology. And, I thought, I knew [Jimmy], I knew he was a like spirit, we share similar tastes and backgrounds in music and things. So I phoned him up that day and said "Let's form a band called The Justified Ancients of Mu-Mu". And he knew exactly, to coin a phrase, "where I was coming from"... Within a week we had recorded our first single.

=== The Justified Ancients of Mu Mu ===
Early in 1987, Drummond and Cauty's collaborations began. They assumed alter egos – King Boy D and Rockman Rock respectively – and adopted the name the Justified Ancients of Mu Mu (the JAMs), after the fictional conspiratorial group "The Justified Ancients of Mummu" from The Illuminatus! Trilogy. The JAMs' primary instrument was the digital sampler with which they would plagiarise the history of popular music, cutting chunks from existing works and pasting them into new contexts, underpinned by rudimentary beatbox rhythms and overlaid with Drummond's raps, of social commentary, esoteric metaphors and mockery.

The JAMs' debut single "All You Need Is Love" dealt with the media coverage given to AIDS, sampling heavily from the Beatles' "All You Need Is Love" and Samantha Fox's "Touch Me (I Want Your Body)". Although it was declined by distributors fearful of prosecution, and threatened with lawsuits, copies of the one-sided white label 12" were sent to the music press; it received positive reviews and was made "single of the week" in Sounds. A later piece in the same magazine called the JAMs "the hottest, most exhilarating band this year .... It's hard to understand what it feels like to come across something you believe to be totally new; I have never been so wholeheartedly convinced that a band are so good and exciting."

The JAMs re-edited and re-released "All You Need Is Love" in May 1987, removing or doctoring the most antagonistic samples; lyrics from the song appeared as promotional graffiti, defacing selected billboards. The re-release rewarded the JAMs with praise (including NME 's "single of the week") and the funds necessary to record their debut album. The album, 1987 (What the F**k Is Going On?), was released in June 1987. Included was a song called "The Queen and I", which sampled the ABBA single "Dancing Queen". After a legal showdown with ABBA and the Mechanical-Copyright Protection Society, the 1987 album was forcibly withdrawn from sale. Drummond and Cauty travelled to Sweden in hope of meeting ABBA and coming to some agreement, taking an NME journalist and photographer with them, along with most of the remaining copies of the LP. They failed to meet ABBA, who they didn't realize already lived in Britain at the time, so they disposed of the copies by burning most of them in a field and throwing the rest overboard on the North Sea ferry trip home. In a December 1987 interview, Cauty maintained that they "felt that what [they]'d done was artistically justified."

Two new singles followed on the JAMs' "KLF Communications" independent record label. Both reflected a shift towards house rhythms. According to NME, the JAMs' choice of samples for the first of these, "Whitney Joins the JAMs" saw them leaving behind their strategy of "collision course" to "move straight onto the art of super selective theft". The song uses samples of the Mission: Impossible and Shaft themes alongside Whitney Houston's "I Wanna Dance with Somebody". Drummond has claimed that the KLF were later offered the job of producing or remixing a new Whitney Houston album as an inducement from her record label boss (Clive Davis of Arista Records) to sign with them. The second single in this sequence – Drummond and Cauty's third and final single of 1987 – was "Down Town", a dance record built around a gospel choir and "Downtown" by 1960s star Petula Clark, with lyrics that commented on poverty and homelessness. These early works were later collected on the compilation album Shag Times.

A second album, Who Killed the JAMs?, was released in early 1988. Who Killed the JAMs? earned the duo a five-star review from Sounds magazine, who called it "a masterpiece of pathos".

=== The Timelords ===
In 1988, Drummond and Cauty released a 'novelty' pop single, "Doctorin' the Tardis" as the Timelords. The song is predominantly a mash-up of the Doctor Who theme music, "Block Buster!" by Sweet and Gary Glitter's "Rock and Roll (Part Two)".

Credited on the record was "Ford Timelord" (Cauty's 1968 Ford Galaxie American police car), "Lord Rock" (Cauty), and "Time Boy" (Drummond). The Timelords claimed that Ford Timelord was the "Talent" in the band and had given them instructions on how to make the record; Ford fronted the promotional campaign for the single and was "interviewed" on TV. The car would later be banger raced at Swaffham Raceway in 1991.

They later portrayed the song as the result of a deliberate effort to write a number one hit single. In interviews with Snub TV and BBC Radio 1, Drummond said that they had intended to make a house record using the Doctor Who theme. After Cauty had laid down a basic track, Drummond observed that their house idea wasn't working and what they actually had was a Glitter beat. Sensing the opportunity to make a commercial pop record they went instead for the lowest common denominator. According to the British music press, the result was "rancid", "pure, unadulterated agony" and "excruciating" and from Sounds "a record so noxious that a top ten place can be its only destiny". A single of the Timelords' remixes of the song was released: "Gary Joins the JAMs" featured original vocal contributions from Glitter, who also appeared on Top of the Pops to promote the song with the Timelords. "Doctorin' the Tardis" sold over one million copies.

The Timelords released one other product, a 1989 book called The Manual (How to Have a Number One the Easy Way), a step-by-step guide to achieving a number one hit single with little money or talent.

=== The KLF ===
By the time the JAMs' single "Whitney Joins the JAMs" was released in September 1987, their record label had been renamed "KLF Communications" (from the earlier The Sound of Mu(sic)). The duo's first release as the KLF was in March 1988, with the single "Burn the Bastards"/"Burn the Beat" (KLF 002). Although the Justified Ancients of Mu Mu name was not retired, most future Drummond and Cauty releases went under the name "The KLF".

The name change accompanied a change in Drummond and Cauty's musical direction. As 'King Boy D', Drummond said in January 1988, "We might put out a couple of 12" records under the name The K.L.F., these will be rap free just pure dance music, so don't expect to see them reviewed in the music papers". King Boy D also said that he and Rockman Rock were "pissed off at [them]selves" for letting "people expect us to lead some sort of crusade for sampling." In 1990, he recalled that "We wanted to make [as the KLF] something that was... pure dance music, without any reference points, without any nod to the history of rock and roll. It was the type of music that by early '87 was really exciting me... [although] we weren't able to get our first KLF records out until late '88."

The 12" records subsequently released in 1988 and 1989 by the KLF were indeed rap free and house-oriented; remixes of some of the JAMs tracks, and new singles, the largely instrumental acid house anthems "What Time Is Love?" and "3 a.m. Eternal", the first incarnations of later international chart successes. The KLF described the new tracks as "Pure Trance". In 1989, the KLF appeared at the Helter Skelter rave in Oxfordshire. "They wooed the crowd", wrote Scotland on Sunday some years later, "by pelting them with... £1,000 worth of Scottish pound notes, each of which bore the message 'Children we love you'".

The KLF's 'Trancentral' logo: speakers arranged in a 'T' shape.

Also in 1989, the KLF embarked upon the creation of a road movie and soundtrack album, both titled The White Room, funded by the profits of "Doctorin' the Tardis". Neither the film nor its soundtrack were formally released, although bootleg copies exist. The soundtrack album contained pop-house versions of some of the "pure trance" singles, as well as new songs, most of which would appear (in radically reworked form) on the version of the album which was eventually released to mainstream success. A single from the original album was released: "Kylie Said to Jason", an electropop record featuring references to Todd Terry, Rolf Harris, Skippy the Bush Kangaroo and BBC comedy programme The Good Life. In reference to that song, Drummond and Cauty noted that they had worn "Pet Shop Boys infatuations brazenly on [their] sleeves."

The film project was fraught with difficulties and setbacks, including dwindling funds. "Kylie Said to Jason", which Drummond and Cauty were hoping could "rescue them from the jaws of bankruptcy", flopped commercially, failing even to make the UK top 100. In consequence, The White Room film project was put on hold, and the KLF abandoned the musical direction of the soundtrack and single. Meanwhile, "What Time Is Love?" was generating acclaim within the underground clubs of continental Europe; according to KLF Communications, "The KLF were being feted by all the 'right' DJs". This prompted Drummond and Cauty to pursue the acid house tone of their Pure Trance series. A further Pure Trance release, "Last Train to Trancentral", followed. By this time, Cauty had co-founded the Orb as an ambient side-project with Alex Paterson. Cauty's ambient album Space and the KLF's "ambient house" LP Chill Out ambient video Waiting were released in 1990, as was a dance track, "It's Grim Up North", under the JAMs' moniker.

Throughout 1990, the KLF launched a series of singles with an upbeat pop-house sound which they dubbed "stadium house". Songs from The White Room soundtrack were re-recorded with rap and more vocals (by guests labelled "Additional Communicators"), a sample-heavy pop-rock production and crowd noise samples. The first "stadium house" single, "What Time Is Love? (Live from Trancentral)", released in October 1990, reached No. 5 on the UK Singles Chart and hit the top-ten internationally. The follow-up, "3 a.m. Eternal (Live at the S.S.L.)", was an international top-five hit in January 1991, reaching No. 1 in the UK and No. 5 on the US Billboard Hot 100. The album The White Room followed in March 1991, reaching No. 3 in the UK. A substantial reworking of the aborted soundtrack, the album featured a segued series of "stadium house" songs followed by downtempo tracks. The KLF's chart success continued with the single "Last Train to Trancentral" hitting number two in the UK, and number three on the Eurochart Hot 100. In December 1991, a re-working of a song from 1987, "Justified & Ancient" was released, featuring Tammy Wynette. It was another international hit – peaking at number two in the UK, and number 11 on the Billboard Hot 100 – as was "America: What Time Is Love?", a hard, guitar-laden reworking of "What Time Is Love?". In 1990 and 1991, the KLF also remixed tracks by Depeche Mode ("Policy of Truth"), the Moody Boys ("What Is Dub?"), and Pet Shop Boys ("So Hard" from the Behaviour album, and "It Must Be Obvious"). Neil Tennant described the process: "When they did the remix of 'So Hard', they didn't do a remix at all, they re-wrote the record ... I had to go and sing the vocals again, they did it in a different way. I was impressed that Bill Drummond had written all the chords out and played it on an acoustic guitar, very thorough."

The "stadium house" singles trilogy was characterised by Tom Ewing of Freaky Trigger as applying "the possibilities for mass lunacy" to "awe-inspiring, colossal, unprecedented dancefloor bulldozers." He adds: "For novelty scam-mongers and pranksters, they knew the public well, particularly that strain in British pop listening which likes an occasional brush with the gigantic. The KLF did to house what Jim Steinman did to rock – they turned it into a thing of tottering grand opera absurdity, pushed the excitement in the music to hysteria, traded content for ever-huger gesture. The difference being that the KLF never lost track of what made the music special in the first place. Maybe because there's less inherent 'meaning' in the KLF's music, or maybe just because the 'meaning' in house music is less fragile".

After successive name changes and dance records, Drummond and Cauty ultimately became, as the KLF, the biggest-selling singles act in the world for 1991, still incorporating the work of other artists but in less gratuitous ways and predominantly without legal problems.

=== BRIT Awards and retirement from the music business ===
On 12 February 1992, the KLF and grindcore group Extreme Noise Terror performed a live version of "3 a.m. Eternal" at the BRIT Awards, the British Phonographic Industry's annual awards show. Drummond and Cauty had planned to throw buckets of blood over the audience, or to disembowel a dead sheep on stage, but were prevented from doing so due to opposition from BBC lawyers and vegetarians Extreme Noise Terror; Sheep were a symbol of the KLF, and Drummond conceded that the "sheep hacking" idea was akin to a suicide. Associates reasoned that the plan was to generate such revulsion towards the KLF that they would be ostracised from the music industry and a comeback would be impossible. The dead sheep purchased but the plan thwarted, Drummond considered chopping his hand off with an axe live on stage.

The performance was instead concluded with a limping, kilted, cigar-chomping Drummond firing blanks from an automatic weapon over the heads of the crowd. As the band left the stage, the KLF's promoter and narrator Scott Piering proclaimed over the PA system that "The KLF have now left the music business". Later in the evening the band dumped the dead sheep, with the message "I died for you – bon appetit" tied around its waist, at the entrance to one of the post-ceremony parties. Piering's PA announcement was largely not taken seriously at the time; even he and other close associates of the band thought the announcement was a joke. NME's detailed piece on the events at the BRIT Awards and the after-party, which included an interview with Drummond the day after, assured readers that the "tensions and contradictions" would continue to "push and spark" the KLF and that more "musical treasure" would be the result.

In the weeks following the BRITs performance, the KLF continued working with Extreme Noise Terror on the album The Black Room, but it was never finished. On 14 May 1992, the KLF announced their immediate retirement from the music industry and the deletion of their back catalogue:

We have been following a wild and wounded, glum and glorious, shit but shining path these past five years. The last two of which has [sic] led us up onto the commercial high ground – we are at a point where the path is about to take a sharp turn from these sunny uplands down into a netherworld of we know not what. For the foreseeable future there will be no further record releases from The Justified Ancients of Mu Mu, The Timelords, The KLF and any other past, present and future name attached to our activities. As of now all our past releases are deleted .... If we meet further along be prepared ... our disguise may be complete.

In a comprehensive examination of the KLF's announcement and its context, Select called it "the last grand gesture, the most heroic act of public self destruction in the history of pop. And it's also Bill Drummond and Jimmy Cauty's final extravagant howl of self disgust, defiance and contempt for a music world gone foul and corrupt." Many of the KLF's friends and collaborators gave their reactions in the magazine. Movie director Bill Butt said that "Like everything, they're dealing with it in a very realistic way, a fresh, unbitter way, which is very often not the case. A lot of bands disappear with such a terrible loss of dignity". Scott Piering said that "They've got a huge buzz off this, that's for sure, because it's something that's finally thrilling. It's scary to have thrown away a fortune which I know they have. Just the idea of starting over is exciting. Starting over on what? Well, they have such great ideas, like buying submarines". Even Kenny Gates, who as a director of the KLF's distributors APT stood to lose financially from the move, called it "Conceptually and philosophically... absolutely brilliant". Mark Stent reported the doubts of many when he said that "I [have] had so many people who I know, heads of record companies, A&R men saying, 'Come on, It's a big scam.' But I firmly believe it's over". "For the very last spectacularly insane time", the magazine concluded, "The KLF have done what was least expected of them".

The final KLF Info sheet discussed the retirement in a typically offbeat fashion, and asked "What happens to 'Footnotes in rock legend'? Do they gather dust with Ashton, Gardner and Dyke, the Vapors, and the Utah Saints, or does their influence live on in unseen ways, permeating future cultures? A passing general of a private army has the answer. 'No', he whispers 'but the dust they gather is of the rarest quality. Each speck a universe awaiting creation, Big Bang just a dawn away'." There have been numerous suggestions that in 1992 Drummond was on the verge of a nervous breakdown. Drummond himself said that he was on the edge of the "abyss". The KLF's BRITs statuette for "Best British Group" of 1992 was later found buried in a field near Stonehenge.

=== K Foundation and other pre-millennium projects ===
The K Foundation was an arts foundation established by Drummond and Cauty in 1993 following their 'retirement' from the music industry. From 1993 to 1995 they engaged in art projects and media campaigns, including the high-profile K Foundation art award (for the "worst artist of the year"), and in 1993 released a limited edition single – "K Cera Cera" – in Israel and Palestine "to create awareness of peace in the world". They burnt what was left of their KLF earnings – a million pounds sterling in cash (equivalent to £2.35m as of 2022) – and filmed the performance. Cauty and Drummond announced a 23-year moratorium on all K Foundation activities in November 1995.

The KLF come out of retirement for 23 minutes to make an appearance as 2K.

Also in 1995, Drummond and Cauty contributed a song to The Help Album as The One World Orchestra ("featuring The Massed Pipes and Drums of the Children's Free Revolutionary Volunteer Guards"). "The Magnificent" is a drum'n'bass version of the theme tune from The Magnificent Seven, with vocal samples from DJ Fleka of Serbian radio station B92: "Humans against killing... that sounds like a junkie against dope".

On 17 September 1997, Drummond and Cauty re-emerged briefly as 2K. 2K made a one-off performance at London's Barbican Arts Centre with Mark Manning, Acid Brass, the Liverpool Dockers and Gimpo; a performance at which "Two elderly gentlemen, reeking of Dettol, caused havoc in their motorised wheelchairs. These old reprobates, bearing a grandfatherly resemblance to messrs Cauty and Drummond, claimed to have just been asked along." The song performed at the Barbican – "***k the Millennium" (a remix of "What Time Is Love?" featuring Acid Brass and incorporating elements of the hymn "Eternal Father, Strong to Save") – was also released as a single. These activities were accompanied by the usual full page press adverts, this time asking readers "***k The Millennium: Yes/No?" with a telephone number provided for voting. At the same time, Drummond and Cauty were also K2 Plant Hire, with plans to build a "People's Pyramid" from used house bricks; this plan never reached fruition. K2 Plant Hire Ltd had been registered at Companies House since 1995; Cauty and Drummond are directors. The Directors' Report for the period ending 31 March 1996 listed the company's activities as "a music company," and the accompanying accounts noted a transaction with "KLF Communications Residual Royalties", a Cauty-Drummond partnership.

=== The Justified Ancients of Mu Mu return ===
On 23 August 2017, in Liverpool, 23 years after they burnt a million pounds, Drummond and Cauty returned as the Justified Ancients of Mu Mu. The duo launched a novel, 2023: A Trilogy, and staged a three day event, "Welcome to the Dark Ages". Ending their self-imposed moratorium, the festival included a debate asking "Why Did The K Foundation Burn A Million Quid?" The JAMs also announced new plans for a People's Pyramid to be built from bricks each containing 23 grams of human ashes. New bricks will be laid at the annual "Toxteth Day Of The Dead".

Cauty emphasised to the BBC in 2018 that the People's Pyramid project, inspired by his brother's death, is serious: "It's easy to make it sound like a joke", he said, "but it isn't a joke, it's deadly serious and it's a long-term project." He also confirmed that The Justified Ancients of Mu Mu are a going concern: "It's interesting to be in a band that doesn't make records but only makes pyramids of dead people.

=== Samplecity thru Trancentral ===
On 31 December 2020, the release of series of remastered compilations under the collective title Samplecity thru Trancentral was announced on a graffiti and posters hung under a railway bridge on Kingsland Road in Shoreditch, East London. The 30-minute collection of eight remastered singles Solid State Logik 1 appeared at midnight 1 January 2021, on streaming platforms, while high-definition videos were published for the first time on the band's official YouTube channel, marking the first activity of Cauty and Drummond as the KLF since 1992. On 23 March 2021, the collection was followed by its part 2 featuring 12" versions of the singles.

On 4 February 2021, a re-edited version of Chill Out was released, retitled Come Down Dawn, with previously unlicensed samples from the original release removed, and added "What Time Is Love? (Virtual Reality Mix)," originally from the 1990 remix EP What Time Is Love? (Remodelled & Remixed), integrated in the new mix.

On 23 April 2021, The White Room (Director's Cut) was officially released as the fourth part of the series. The album's edition includes tracks from the unreleased 1989 album, as well as an extended version of "Last Train to Trancentral" from the 1991 album.

The documentary Who Killed the KLF?, directed by Chris Atkins, was released on April 4, 2022. Atkins began creating the documentary against Drummond's and Cauty's wishes, but was incarcerated in 2016 for tax fraud for two years; he continued editing the film while in prison. According to Atkins, the duo eventually claimed they "love" the film, though they pointed out some minor inaccuracies.

The band's master tapes were donated to the British Library in 2023.

== KLF Communications ==
The Pyramid Blaster – the logo of KLF Communications

From their very earliest releases as The Justified Ancients of Mu Mu until their retirement in 1992, the music of Bill Drummond and Jimmy Cauty was independently released in their home country (the UK). Their debut releases – the single "All You Need Is Love" and the album 1987 – were released under the label name "The Sound Of Mu(sic)". By the end of 1987 Drummond and Cauty had renamed their label to "KLF Communications" and, in October 1987, the first of many "information sheets" (self written missives from the KLF to fans and the media) was sent out by the label.

KLF Communications releases were distributed by Rough Trade Distribution (a spinoff of Rough Trade Records) in the South East of England, and across the wider UK by the Cartel. As Drummond and Cauty explained, "The Cartel is, as the name implies, a group of independent distributors across the country who work in conjunction with each other providing a solid network of distribution without stepping on each other's toes. We are distributed by the Cartel." When Rough Trade Distribution collapsed in 1991 it was reported that they owed KLF Communications £500,000. Plugging (the promotion to TV and radio) was handled by longtime associate Scott Piering.

Outside the UK, KLF releases were issued under licence by local labels. In the US, the licensees were Wax Trax (the Chill Out album), TVT (early releases including The History of The JAMs a.k.a. The Timelords), and Arista Records (The White Room and singles (Note: Bill Drummond explained the licensing situation – and inducements made by Arista – in an interview by Ernie Longmire, X Magazine, July 1991.)). The KLF Communications physical catalogue remains deleted in the United Kingdom.

== Themes ==
Several threads and themes unify the many incarnations of Drummond and Cauty's creative partnership, many of these influenced by The Illuminatus! Trilogy; combined, these themes, threads and their activities over the years have been said to form a "mythology." Drummond and Cauty made heavy references to Discordianism, popularised by Robert Shea and Robert Anton Wilson in the Illuminatus! books, Situationism, and tactics often interpreted by media commentators as "Situationist pranks.

In a 2000 review of Drummond's book 45, and an appraisal of the duo's career to date, writer Steven Poole stated that Drummond and Cauty "are the only true conceptual artists of the [1990s]. And for all the eldritch beauty of their art, their most successful creation is the myth they have built around themselves." This deep and perplexing mythology, he suggested, results in all their subsequent activities (as a partnership or otherwise) being absorbed into their mystique:

A myth like the KLF's is peculiarly omnivorous. Just as there can never be any evidence to disprove a conspiracy theory because the fabrication of such evidence – don't you see? – is itself part of the conspiracy, so the pop myth of the KLF can never be blown apart by anything they do, no matter how dumb or embarrassing. The myth will suck it up, like a black hole.

Drummond and Cauty have also been compared to Stewart Home and the Neoists. Home himself said that the duo's work "has much more in common with the Neoist, Plagiarist and Art Strike movements of the nineteen-eighties than with the Situationist avant-garde of the fifties and sixties." Drummond and Cauty "represent a vital and innovative strand within contemporary culture", he added.

=== Illuminatus! ===
Drummond was the set designer on Ken Campbell's 1976 stage production of The Illuminatus! Trilogy. In the first KLF Communications Info Sheet, Drummond explained that The Justified Ancients of Mu Mu name was "pinched" from Illuminatus! which he had been reading the year before.

A notable theme of Illuminatus! is the number 23, placed overtly and surreptitiously, both in the book and later throughout the band's career:

- In lyrics to the song "Next" from the album 1987: "23 years is a mighty long time".
- They announced they had signed a contract preventing either of them from publicly discussing the burning of a million pounds for a period of 23 years;
- The 1997 return as 2K was "for 23 minutes only".
- In numbering schemes: for instance, the debut single "All You Need Is Love" took the catalogue number JAMS 23, while the final KLF Communications Information Sheet was numbered 23; and Cauty's Ford Galaxie police car had on its roof the identification mark 23.
- In significant dates during their work: for instance, a rare public appearance by the KLF, at the Liverpool Festival of Comedy, was on 23 June 1991; they announced the winner of the K Foundation award on 23 November 1993; and they burned one million pounds on 23 August 1994.
- The 2017 reunion happened at 00:23 on 23 August 23 years after the burning, with the release of a book entitled 2023: A Trilogy. The numerals of the date – 23 August 2017 – also sum to 23 (2+3+0+8+2+0+1+7=23).

When questioned on the importance that he attaches to this number, Drummond has been evasive, responding enigmatically "I know. But I'm not going to tell, because then other people would have to stop having to wonder and the thing about beauty is for other people to wonder at it. It's not very beautiful once you know."

The "Pyramid Blaster" is a logo and icon frequently and prominently depicted within the duo's collective work: a pyramid, in front of which is suspended a ghetto blaster displaying the word "Justified". This references the Eye of Providence icon, often depicted as an eye within a triangle or pyramid, a significant symbol of Illuminatus! The pyramid was also a theme of the duo's 1997 and 2017 reunions, with the proposed building by K2 Plant Hire of a "People's Pyramid" (in 1997, a pyramid built with as many bricks as there were births in the 20th century in the UK, and in 2017 a pyramid built from bricks containing the ashes of dead people).

=== Trancentral ===
Trancentral (a.k.a. the Benio) was the band's studios. Despite the grandiose lyrics of "Last Train to Trancentral", the Trancentral was in fact Cauty's residence in Stockwell, South London (51.471373°N 0.128167°W), "a large and rather grotty squat." According to Melody Maker's David Stubbs, "Jimmy has lived [there] for 12 years. There's little evidence of fame or fortune. The kitchen is heated by means of leaving the three functioning gas rings on at full blast until the fumes make us all feel stoned... And pinned just above a working top cluttered with chipped mugs is a letter from a five-year-old fan featuring a crayon drawing of the band."

=== Sheep ===
Following the February 1990 release of Chill Out (the press release for which credited sheep as guest vocalists), sheep had recurring roles in the duo's output until their 1992 retirement. Drummond has claimed that the use of sheep on the Chill Out cover was intended to evoke contemporary rural raves and the cover of the Pink Floyd album Atom Heart Mother.

=== Ceremonies and journeys ===
Drummond and Cauty's work often involved notions of ceremony and journey. Journeys are the subject of the KLF Communications recordings Chill Out, Space, "Last Train to Trancentral", "Justified & Ancient" and "America: What Time Is Love?", as well as the aborted film project The White Room. The Chill Out album depicts a journey across the U.S. Gulf Coast. In his book 45, Drummond expressed his admiration for the work of artist Richard Long, who incorporates physical journeys into his art.

Fire and sacrifice were recurring ceremonial themes: Drummond and Cauty made fires to dispose of their illegal debut album and to sacrifice the KLF's profits; their dead sheep gesture of 1992 carried a sacrificial message. The KLF's short film The Rites of Mu depicts their celebration of the 1991 summer solstice on the Hebridean island of Jura: a 60-foot (18 m) tall wicker man was burnt at a ceremony in which journalists were asked to wear yellow and grey robes and join a chant; the journalists' money was also burnt.

=== Promotion ===
A K2 Plant Hire advertisement, exhibiting the stark quality of Drummond and Cauty's press adverts, and the characteristic typeface

Drummond and Cauty were renowned for their distinctive and humorous public appearances (including several on Top of the Pops), at which they were often costumed. They granted few interviews, communicating instead via semi-regular newsletters, or cryptically phrased full-page adverts in UK national newspapers and the music press. Such adverts were typically stark, comprising large white lettering on black.

From the outset of their collaborations, Drummond and Cauty practised the guerrilla communication tactic that they described as "illegal but effective use of graffiti on billboards and public buildings" in which "the original meaning of the advert would be totally subverted". Much as the JAMs' early recordings carried messages on the back of existing musical works, their promotional graffiti often derived its potency from the context in which it was placed. For instance, The JAMs' "SHAG SHAG SHAG" graffiti, coinciding with their release of "All You Need Is Love", was drawn over the "HALO HALO HALO" slogan of a Today billboard that depicted Greater Manchester Police Chief Constable James Anderton, who had decried homosexuals amidst the UK media's AIDS furore. (Note: For a general overview see: "The 1980s AIDS campaign" by Panorama on the BBC News website. A fuller set of references are available in the article "All You Need Is Love (The JAMs song)".)

Music press journalists were occasionally invited to witness the defacements. In December 1987, a Melody Maker reporter was in attendance to see Cauty reverse his car Ford Timelord alongside a billboard and stand on its roof to graffiti a Christmas message from the JAMs. In February 1991, another Melody Maker journalist watched the KLF deface a billboard advertising The Sunday Times, doctoring the slogan "THE GULF: the coverage, the analysis, the facts" by painting a 'K' over the 'GU'. Drummond and Cauty were, on this occasion, caught at the scene by police and arrested, later to be released without charge.

In November 1991, the JAMs placed a photograph of graffiti with the slogan "It's Grim Up North" – which had appeared on the junction of London's M25 orbital motorway with the M1 that runs to Northern England – as an advert in the NME. The graffiti, for which the JAMs denied responsibility, had been the subject of an early day motion in the British House of Commons on 21 October 1991. In September 1997, on the day after Drummond and Cauty's brief reemergence as 2K, the graffiti "1997: What The Fuck's Going On?" appeared on the outside wall of London's National Theatre, ten years after the slogan "1987: What The Fuck's Going On?" had been similarly placed to mark the release of the JAMs' debut album.

=== Reputation as "pranksters" ===
Cauty and Drummond's tactics have often been labelled by media commentators as "pranks" or "publicity stunts". In 1991, Drummond told an NME journalist that "we never felt we went out and did things to get reactions. Everything we've done has just been on a gut level instinct", whilst acknowledging that people would likely not believe him. On the morning after the BRITs performance, an impassioned Drummond told the NME that "I really hate it when people go on about us being 'schemers' and 'scammers'. We do all this stuff from the very depths of our soul and people make out its some sort of game. It depresses me." Cauty has expressed similar feelings, saying of the KLF, "I think it worked because we really meant it."

== Legacy ==
KLF Communications' advert for "Justified & Ancient", with a quote from the lyrics: "They travel the world in their ice cream van, they've voyaged to the bottom of time. They've been to the place where the Mu-Mu mate, and the children still cry 'Mine's a 99!'"

Chill Out is cited by AllMusic as "one of the essential ambient albums". In 1996, Mixmag named Chill Out the fifth best "dance" album of all time, describing Cauty's DJ sets with the Orb's Alex Paterson as "seminal". The Guardian has credited the KLF with inventing "stadium house"; NME named the KLF's stadium house album The White Room the 81st best album of all time whilst Q listed it as the 89th best British album of all time, in 2000.

=== Opinions of contemporaries ===
In 1991, Chris Lowe of Pet Shop Boys said that he considered the only other worthwhile group in the UK to be the KLF. Neil Tennant added that "They have an incredibly recognisable sound. I liked it when they said EMF nicked the F from KLF. They're from a different tradition to us in that they're pranksters and we've never been pranksters."

At the time of the KLF's retirement announcement, Drummond's old friend and colleague David Balfe said of Drummond's KLF career that "the path he's trod[den] is a more artistic one than mine. I know that deep down I like the idea of building up a very successful career, where Bill is more interested in weird stuff ... I think the very avoidance of cliché has become their particular cliché".

In March 1994, members of the anarchist band Chumbawamba expressed their respect for the KLF. Vocalist and percussionist Alice Nutter referred to the KLF as "real situationists" categorising them as political musicians alongside the Sex Pistols and Public Enemy. Dunst Bruce lauded the K Foundation, concluding "I think the things the KLF do are fantastic. I'm a vegetarian but I wish they'd sawn an elephant's legs off at the BRIT Awards."

=== Direct influence ===
The KLF have been imitated to some degree by German techno band Scooter, being sampled on virtually every album Scooter have released.

In the weeks leading up to the 1996 FA Cup Final, a group called "1300 Drums featuring the Unjustified Ancients of M.U." released a novelty single to cash-in on the popularity of Manchester United footballer Eric Cantona.

The Timelords' book, The Manual, was used by the one-hit-wonders Edelweiss to secure their hit "Bring Me Edelweiss".

The duo "The FLK" released two albums and several singles in the 2010s, appropriating the KLF's aesthetic and musical style and mixing it with samples and references from folk music. Their anonymity, along with details such as their use of a Ford Timelord which was very similar to the one in the KLF's videos and promotional material, led some to believe that the FLK actually were the KLF. However, it emerged in 2018 that they were two ex-members of the Leeds-based indie band The Hollow Men.

=== Career retrospectives ===
Drummond and Cauty have appeared frequently in British broadsheets and music papers since the KLF's retirement, most often in connection with the K Foundation and their burning of one million pounds. The NME called them "masters of manipulating media and perceptions of themselves".

In 1992, NME referred to the KLF as "Britain's greatest pop group" and "the two most brilliant minds in pop today", and in 2002 listed the duo in their "Top 50 Icons" at number 48. The British music paper also listed the KLF's 1992 BRIT Awards appearance at number 4 in their "top 100 rock moments of all time". "What's unique about Drummond and Cauty", the paper said in 1993, "is the way that, under all the slogans and the sampling and the smart hits and the dead sheep and the costumes, they appear not only to care, but to have some idea of how to achieve what they want."

"[Of their many aliases,] it is as the KLF that they will go down in pop history," wrote Alix Sharkey in 1994, "for a variety of reasons, the most important being the resolute purity of their self-abnegation, and their visionary understanding of pop." He added: "By early 1992 the KLF was easily the best-selling, probably the most innovative, and undoubtedly the most exhilarating pop phenomenon in Britain. In five years it had gone from pressing up 500 copies of its debut recording to being one of the world's top singles acts." The same piece also quoted Sheryl Garratt, editor of The Face: "the music hasn't dated. I still get an adrenaline rush listening to it." Garratt believes their influence on the British house and rap scene cannot be overestimated. "Their attitude was shaped by the rave scene, but they also love pop music. So many people who make pop actually despise it, and it shows."

Trouser Press reviewer Ira Robbins referred to the KLF's body of work as "a series of colorful sonic marketing experiments". The Face called them "the kings of cultural anarchy". Robert Sandall wrote in 1993 that one of the KLF's "maxims" was "making the unthinkable happen". In 1999, Ewing wrote: "Even before they put their money where their matches were, the KLF, also known as the Justified Ancients Of Mu Mu, furthermore known as the JAMMS, were the most brilliant pop-artists of the decade. They were witty with the left hand and baffling with the right; they had a sense of timing and event like nobody since Maclaren; they appeared to not give even the merest hint of a fuck; and they made records which were the best shotgun wedding of concept to rhythm this side of Kraftwerk."

In 2003, The Observer named the KLF's departure from the music business (and the BRITs performance in which the newspaper says "their legend was sealed") the fifth greatest "publicity stunt" in the history of popular music. A 2000 piece in The Daily Telegraph called the BRITs performance "violently antagonistic" and reported that the "music-business audience" was "stunned"; on the other hand, Piers Morgan writing shortly after the performance called the KLF "pop's biggest wallies". A 2004 listener poll by BBC 6 Music saw the KLF/K Foundation placed second in a list of "rock excesses", after The Who.

A 2017 piece in The Guardian, pondering the rumoured return of The KLF, noted that "in the 25 years since their disappearance, nobody else has come up with anything that matches the duo's extraordinary career"; another piece in the same newspaper in the same year, by a different author, called them "abstruse" and "pop's greatest provocateurs", and their career "anarchic, anti-commercial and mostly ludicrous".

== Instrumentation ==
Early releases by the JAMs, including the album 1987, were performed using an Apple II computer with a Greengate DS3 sampler peripheral card, and a Roland TR-808 drum machine. On later releases, the Greengate DS3 and Apple II were replaced with an Akai S900 sampler and Atari ST computers respectively.

The KLF's 1990–1992 singles were mixed by Mark Stent, using a Solid State Logic automated mixing desk, and The White Room album mixed by J. Gordon-Hastings using an analogue desk. The SSL is referenced in the subtitle of the KLF single "3 a.m. Eternal (Live at the S.S.L.)", and the title of their 2021 digital compilation albums Solid State Logik 1 and Solid State Logik 2.

The house music of Space and the KLF involved much original instrumentation, for which the Oberheim OB-8 analogue synthesiser was prominently used. Drummond played a Gibson ES-330 semi-acoustic guitar on "America: What Time Is Love?", and Cauty played electric guitar on "Justified & Ancient (Stand by The JAMs)" and "America: What Time Is Love?". Graham Lee provided prominent pedal steel contributions to the KLF's Chill Out and "Build a Fire". Duy Khiem played clarinet on "3 a.m. Eternal" and "Make It Rain". The KLF track "America No More" features a pipe band. The Roland TB-303 bassline and Roland TR-909 drum machine feature on "What Time Is Love (Live at Trancentral)".

== Discography ==
- The Justified Ancients of Mu Mu: 1987 (What the Fuck Is Going On?) (The Sound of Mu(sic), 1987)
- The Justified Ancients of Mu Mu: Who Killed The JAMs? (KLF Communications, 1988)
- The Justified Ancients of Mu Mu/The KLF/The Timelords: Shag Times (KLF Communications, 1988)
- The KLF/Various Artists: The "What Time Is Love?" Story (KLF Communications, 1989)
- The KLF: Chill Out (KLF Communications, 1990)
- Space: Space (KLF Communications, 1990)
- The KLF: The White Room (KLF Communications, 1991)
- The KLF: Solid State Logik 1 (KLF Communications, 2021)
- The KLF: Come Down Dawn (KLF Communications, 2021)
- The KLF: Solid State Logik 2 (KLF Communications, 2021)
- The KLF: The White Room – The KLF 1989 Director's Cut (KLF Communications, 2021)

== See also ==
- List of ambient music artists
- List of The KLF's creative associates
- Anti-art
