= 1987 (What the Fuck Is Going On?) =

Debut album of The Justified Ancients of Mu Mu

Studio album by the Justified Ancients of Mu Mu
- Released: 15 June 1987 (album); 16 October 1987 (JAMs 45 edits)
- Recorded: 1987
- Genres: House; hip-hop
- Length: 40:56
- Labels: The Sound of Mu(sic); (KLF Communications)
- Producers: Rockman Rock; King Boy Hard; (the Justified Ancients of Mu Mu)

The Justified Ancients of Mu Mu chronology
1987 (What the Fuck Is Going On?) (1987)	Who Killed The JAMs? (1988)

1987 (What the Fuck Is Going On?) is the debut studio album by British electronic band the Justified Ancients of Mu Mu (the JAMs), later known as the KLF. 1987 was produced using extensive unauthorised samples that plagiarised a wide range of musical works, continuing a theme begun in the JAMs' debut single, "All You Need Is Love". These samples provided a deliberately provocative backdrop for beatbox rhythms and cryptic, political raps.

Shortly after independent release in June 1987, the JAMs were ordered by the Mechanical-Copyright Protection Society to destroy all unsold copies of the album, following a complaint from ABBA. In response, the JAMs disposed of many copies of 1987 in unorthodox, publicised ways. They also released a version of the album titled 1987 (The JAMs 45 Edits), stripped of all unauthorised samples to leave periods of protracted silence and so little audible content that it was formally classed as a 12-inch single.

== Background and recording ==
On New Year's Day 1987, Bill Drummond decided to make a hip hop record under the pseudonym "the Justified Ancients of Mu Mu". Knowing little about modern music technology, he invited Jimmy Cauty, a former member of the band Brilliant, to join him. Cauty agreed, and the JAMs' debut single, "All You Need Is Love", was independently released on 9 March 1987 as a limited-edition one-sided white label 12-inch. Cauty became "Rockman Rock", and Drummond used the nickname "King Boy Hard" (Later "King Boy D"). (Note: King Boy D had been unmasked as Bill Drummond in weekly music paper NME as early as 28 March 1987. The aliases "King Boy D" and "Rockman Rock" survived the Justified Ancients of Mu-Mu transition into the KLF, although they were briefly changed to "Time Boy" and "Lord Rock" during promotion of The Timelords' first and only single, "Doctorin' the Tardis".)

The reaction to "All You Need Is Love" was positive; the British music newspaper Sounds listed it as the single of the week, and lauded the JAMs as "the hottest, most exhilarating band this year". The song's reliance on uncleared, often illegal samples made commercial release impossible. In response, the JAMs re-edited the single, removing or doctoring the most antagonistic samples, and re-released it as "All You Need Is Love (106 bpm)" in May 1987. According to Drummond, profits from this re-release funded the recording of their first album. The JAMs had completed and pressed copies of the album by early May 1987, but did not have a distributor.

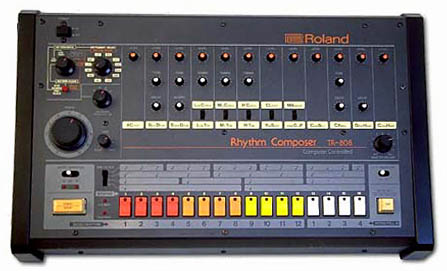
The basic track for "All You Need Is Love" was written in part on a Roland TR-808 Rhythm Composer

Like "All You Need Is Love", the album was made using an Apple II computer, a Greengate DS3 digital sampler peripheral card, and a Roland TR-808 drum machine. Several songs were liberally plagiarised, using portions from existing works and pasting them into new contexts, with the duo stealing "everything" and "taking... plagiarism to its absurd conclusion". This mashup of samples was underpinned by rudimentary beatbox rhythms and overlaid with Drummond's raps of social commentary, esoteric metaphors, and mockery. Drummond later said that:

We'd just got ourselves a sampler, and we went sample-crazy. We just went through my whole collection of records, sampling tons of stuff and putting it all together, and it was a real rush of excitement, when we were doing it. When we put that record out, we knew what we were doing was illegal, but we thought it was gonna be such an underground record, nobody would ever hear about it. So the first thing that shocked us is that British rock papers gave a big review.

== Composition ==
"All You Need Is Love (106bpm)"
A remade version of the JAMs' first white label single with a number of illegal samples removed. King Boy D's distinctive "Clydeside" rapping style can be heard in this extract.

"The Queen and I"
The most controversial song on the album, "The Queen and I" sampled from ABBA's "Dancing Queen". A legal dispute with the group led to the album's withdrawal.

1987 is built around samples of other artists' work, "to the point where the presence of original material becomes questionable". The album is raw and unpolished, the sound contrasting sharply with the meticulous production and tight house rhythms of the duo's later work as the KLF. The beatbox rhythms are basic (described as "weedy" by Q magazine), samples often cut abruptly, and distinctive plagiarised melodies are often played with a high-pitched rasping accompaniment. The plagiarised works are arranged so as to juxtapose with each other as a backdrop for the JAMs' rebellious messages and social comments. (Note: See, for example, Sounds Magazine's "All You Need Is Love" review, which comments on the juxtaposition of samples of Samantha Fox and "Ring a Ring O'Roses" to "[highlight] explicitly the depth of contradiction embedded in society's attitude towards death through sex". Similar commentary on the situational use of samples was provided in Melody Maker's review of 1987.) The lyrics include self-referential statements of the JAMs' agenda, imbued with their fictional backstory adopted from The Illuminatus! Trilogy.

=== Side one ===
The album's opening song, "Hey Hey We Are Not The Monkees", begins with simulated human sexual intercourse noises (which Drummond later referred to as "sampled breathing stuff") arranged as a rhythm. The album's first sample is "Here we come..." from the Monkees' theme. It progresses into a cryptic and bleak spoken verse from Drummond: "Here we come, crawling out of the mud, from chaos primeval to the burned out sun, dragging our bad selves from one end of time, with nothing to declare but some half-written rhymes". A cacophone of further samples from The Monkees' theme and Drummond's voice follow – "We're not The Monkees, I don't even like The Monkees!" – before it gets interrupted by an original a cappella vocal line that later became The KLF's "Justified and Ancient" – "We're justified/And we're ancient. We don't want to upset the apple cart/And we don't wanna cause any harm".

The track is followed by a long sample of a London Underground train arriving at and leaving a tube station, with its recorded warning to passengers, "Mind the gap...". "Don't Take Five (Take What You Want)" follows, featuring the JAMs' associates Chike (rapper) and DJ Cesare (scratches). Built around The Dave Brubeck Quartet's "Take Five" and Fred Wesley's "Same Beat", the lyrics are mostly unconventional, with the majority of the song containing references to food: "I was pushing my trolley from detergent to cheese when I first saw the man with antler ears. I tried to ignore but his gaze held my eyes when he told me the truth about the basket of lies". Sounds considered the message of the song (if any) to be a modern version of Robin Hood: "This is piracy in action, with the venerable music industry figure, King Boy D, setting himself up as the Robin Hood of rap as he steals from the rich vaults of recording history".

The first side of the LP closes with "Rockman Rock (Parts 2 and 3)", a homage to Jimmy Cauty that plagiarises from an array of sources, including the "Bo Diddley Beat" and "Sunrise Sunset" from the Fiddler on the Roof soundtrack. Led Zeppelin's "Whole Lotta Love" (interspersed with Jimi Hendrix's "All Along the Watchtower"), "Since I've Been Loving You" and "Houses of the Holy" can be also heard in this track. Side one would not close until "Why Did You Throw Away Your Giro?", a track consisting of a question in reference to a line from "Rockman Rock" from a female adult jokingly answered by a male person, ended in 20 seconds.

=== Side two ===
The second side begins with "Me Ru Con", a traditional Vietnamese song (Note: "Traditional" per the song writing credit on the label of 1987, JAMS LP1.) performed a cappella by the JAMs' friend Duy Khiem. (Note: Khiem is credited as "Zuy Khiem" on "1987: The JAMs 45 Edits" and "Z Khiem" on the "All You Need Is Love (Mẹ Ru Con Remix)" single, but later in the KLF's career the credits changed to "Duy Khiem".) According to Drummond, it was a spontaneous recital by Khiem, who was in the studio contributing clarinet and tenor sax to the album. Khiem's vocal performance was later sampled by The KLF on the ambient house soundtrack to their movie, The Rites of Mu.

"The Queen and I" features extensive samples from ABBA's "Dancing Queen", often overlain with a rasping detuned accompaniment. These lead into Drummond's satirical and discontent rapping, a fictional account of his march into the British House of Commons and Buckingham Palace to demand answers. The song also protests the involvement of cigarette companies in sport ("When cancer is the killer/John Player run the league") and lambasts the "tabloid mentality" ("They all keep talking about Princess Di's dress"). The Sex Pistols' "God Save the Queen" is briefly sampled. After nearly three minutes of samples from the television show Top of the Pops, as well as sound clips from programmes and advertisements on other TV channels, Drummond cries "Fuck that, let's have The JAMs!". The acerbic "All You Need Is Love (106 bpm)" follows. A "stunning audio collage" featuring an AIDS public information film, a rerecording of glamour model Samantha Fox's "Touch Me (I Want Your Body)", and the nursery rhyme "Ring a Ring o' Roses", "All You Need Is Love" comments on sex and the British media's reaction to the AIDS crisis.

The final track on the album is "Next", which Drummond describes as "the only angst-er on the album", with "imagery of war and sordid sex". The track samples Stevie Wonder's "Superstition", Scott Walker's "Next" from Scott 2, the Fall's "Totally Wired," and Julie Andrews' "The Lonely Goatherd" from The Sound of Music, alongside Khiem's original melancholy clarinet and tenor saxophone contributions ("a saxophone of stupefying tediosity", according to Danny Kelly).

Bill Drummond summed up the JAMs' approach to composition in the first "KLF Information Sheet", sent out in October 1987: "We made [the album] not giving a shit for soul boy snob values or any other values, we just went in and made the noise we wanted to hear and the stuff that came out of our mouths.... Not a pleasant sound but it's the noise we had. We pressed it up and stuck it out. A celebration of sorts." Jimmy Cauty defended sampling as an artistic practice: "It's not as if we're taking anything away, just borrowing and making things bigger. If you're creative you aren't going to stop working just because there is a law against what you are doing."

In 1991, Drummond admitted: "We didn't listen to 1987 What The Fuck's Going On for a long time, and when we did we were embarrassed by it because it was so badly recorded. But I still felt we were able to get a lot out of ourselves through it."

== Release and controversy ==
1987 (What the Fuck Is Going On?) was released in June 1987 on the JAMs' own record label, "The Sound of Mu(sic)". (Note: The record was, however, categorised as a "KLF Communication", the label-notes referencing a future name of both the duo (The KLF) and their independent record company (KLF Communications): "All sounds on this recording have been captured by the KLF in the name of Mu, we hereby liberate these sounds from all copyright restrictions, without prejudice. A KLF Communication.") (Note: The record was probably distributed by Rough Trade Distribution but available sources are not explicit. Bill Drummond told Underground magazine in March 1987 that "we approached Rough Trade but they've not said anything yet." In The Manual, the duo said: "Our experience was with Rough Trade. When we went to them with our first record on KLF they didn't want to know. They saw it as something that might sell five hundred copies, the bulk of those going to unsuspecting export accounts. This record then received good reviews in the rock press so they agreed to distribute it. It was not until we were about to record our second LP that they considered it worth their while to handle the manufacturing as well." Manufacture of 1987 was arranged by the JAMs themselves, the record being pressed by MPO in France.)

1987 was met with mixed reviews in most of the major British music publications, including Melody Maker, NME, Sounds, and Q, and the album came to the attention of the management of Swedish pop group ABBA: The JAMs had sampled large portions of the ABBA single "Dancing Queen" on the track "The Queen And I". A legal showdown with ABBA and the Mechanical-Copyright Protection Society (MCPS) followed, 1987 was forcibly withdrawn from sale, and the JAMs were ordered to "deliver up the master tape, mothers, stampers and any other parts commensurate with manufacture of the record".

King Boy D and Rockman Rock travelled to ABBA's home country of Sweden, in the hope of meeting with ABBA personally, taking an NME journalist and photographer with them, along with most of the remaining copies of the LP and a gold disc of the album. Failing to find ABBA in residence at Polar Studios in Stockholm, they instead presented the gold disc to a blonde prostitute they pretended was Agnetha Fältskog "fallen on hard times". Of the original LP's stock, some copies were disposed overboard on the North Sea ferry trip across, and the remainder were burned in a field in Gothenburg before dawn (as shown on the cover of their next album, Who Killed The JAMs?, and detailed in that album's single "Burn the Bastards"). The JAMs also played a recording of "The Queen and I" loudly outside the offices of ABBA's record label, Polar Music. The trip was unexpectedly eventful, the JAMs accidentally hitting and killing a moose, and later being shot at by a farmer, a bullet cracking the engine of their Ford Galaxie police car. They were, by their own account, towed back to England by the AA.

The JAMs were not entirely sure what they would have said to ABBA if they had been able to meet them. Rockman told NME: "We were hoping to explain [our artistic justification] to them and that maybe we'd come out of it friends, you know, them producing our album and us producing theirs—the kind of thing that often happens at these meetings." King Boy: "Yeah, we'd have said, 'Look, you haven't had many hits lately, you don't really wanna bother with all this West End musical shit do you? Come and do the new JAMMS [sic] album.'" In 1994, The Guardian looked back on the Swedish sojourn as "a grand, futile, attention-grabbing gesture, the kind that would come to characterise [the duo's] collaborative career... 'We were being totally stupid about it' Drummond later acknowledged."

The JAMs offered what they claimed were "the last five" copies of 1987 for sale at £1000 each in a full-page advertisement in the April 1988 edition of The Face. Drummond argued that the offer exploited a loophole in the JAMs' agreement with the MCPS: "We were browsing around this record shop and came across these five copies of 1987.... We made it perfectly clear to the MCPS that we couldn't actually force the shops to send our LPs back.... [B]ecause we bought them in a shop, these LPs don't come into the agreement and we can do what we like with them and not break any laws." The master acetate and all of the band's other masters were donated to the British Library in 2023.

== Critical response ==
Professional ratings
Review scores
Source	Rating
AllMusic	2.5/5 stars
Q	3/5 stars
Sounds	5/5 stars
Spin Alternative Record Guide	6/10
The Virgin Encyclopedia of Eighties Music	3/5 stars

Q had mixed reactions to 1987, saying that there are "too few ideas being spread too thin". The magazine criticised some songs as "overlong" and questioned the overuse of sampling as "the impression of a random hotchpotch". Q also unfavourably commented that the JAMs' "use of the beatbox is altogether weedy". It liked some of its tracks: "there are some wickedly amusing ideas and moments of pure poetry in the lyrics while some of the musical juxtapositions are both killingly funny and strong enough to stand repeated listenings".

A reviewer for Melody Maker found 1987 "inspirational", and "the most exciting, most original record [he'd] heard in years". He also argued that: "Some snatches [of plagiarised music] rather outstay their welcome, tugging tell-tale glitz away from the clifftop and dangerously close to smug obviousness, but when the blows are kept short, sharp and very bloody, they make anything else you're very likely to hear on the radio dull and desperately humourless." "It's easy to dismiss The JAMs frolics as little more than a brightly coloured sideshow to the shabbiest circus in town", a later article said, but "believe me, it's far more than a gimmick".

In awarding 1987 the highest rating, a maximum five stars, Sounds—a publication that offered the duo's work consistent approval—mused, "Taking the sound of the moment (hip hop) as a backbone, 1987 steals sound artefacts from anywhere and meshes them together with King Boy's hysterical 'Clydeside' rap method with bewildering effect. You could call this sampling technology's answer to T. S. Eliot's arch cut up work, The Wasteland. " "What's so good about The JAMs", the magazine said, "is the way they are capturing on disc the whole social and musical confusion and instability of 1987 Britain".

NME's Danny Kelly was not so impressed. He also felt that the record was underdeveloped and the JAMs were not the most skilled of practitioners. "Audacity, completely unfounded self-confidence, utter ruthlessness and a fast car will, of course, be useful attributes to the go-ahead noise-pirate of the 90s, but skill, feel, instinct, vision—y'know, boring old talent—will still be bottom line compulsories, it's in these latter commodities that the JAMs seem conspicuously undertooled." Compared to the output of DJ Code Money or Cut Creator ("all humour, vibrancy and colour – aerosoled version[s] of The Book of Kells") Kelly felt Drummond's efforts to be a "glitter-crusted charity Christmas card". A later NME item called 1987 "the best comment on sampling culture ever made".

A retrospective review by AllMusic commented that 1987 is "a hilarious record" filled with "comments on music terrorism and [the JAMs'] own unique take on the Run-D.M.C. type of old-school rapping"; and The Penguin Price Guide for Record & CD Collectors called 1987 an "entirely brilliant example of the art of disc-jockey-as-producer". Giving another retrospective review from across the Atlantic, Trouser Press described 1987 as "energetic" and "a loopy dance album that isn't unlike a lot of sampled records, but proceeds from an entirely different cultural understanding."

== Personnel ==
Bill Drummond and Jimmy Cauty were responsible for the concept and production of 1987, its lyrics and the TR-808 beatbox rhythms. Drummond provided rap, and an additional rapper introduced as "Chike" appears on "Don't Take Five (Take What You Want)" and "Rockman Rock (Parts 2 and 3)". Duy Khiem contributed lead vocals to "Mẹ Ru Con", as well as clarinet and tenor sax to "Rockman Rock (Parts 2 and 3)" and "Next".

== Track listing ==
Side one

1. "Hey Hey We Are Not The Monkees (100 BPM)" (Note: The "BPM" values (beats per minute) are taken from the sleeve of 1987. They are presented here as printed on the sleeve and may not be accurate.) – 6:00
2. "Mind the Gap" [unlisted sample of ambient noise in a London Underground station] – 1:02
3. "Don't Take Five (Take What You Want) (89 BPM)" – 3:59
4. "Rockman Rock Parts 2 and 3 (105 BPM)" – 6:29
5. "Why Did You Throw Away Your Giro?" [unlisted two people making a reference to a song on the album] – 0:20

Side two

6. "Mẹ Ru Con (0 BPM)" – 2:23
7. "The Queen and I (99 BPM)" – 4:43
8. "Top of the Pops" [unlisted samples of television programmes including Top of the Pops] – 2:51
9. "All You Need Is Love (106 BPM)" – 4:55
10. "Next (100 BPM)" – 7:15

== "1987: The JAMs 45 Edits" ==
Following the enforced deletion of the 1987 album, the Justified Ancients of Mu Mu released an edited version as a 12" single, with all of the unauthorised samples removed, leaving sparse instrumentation, Drummond's social commentary and, in several cases, long periods of silence; the "Top of the Pops" section of the original LP yielded three minutes of silence on 45 Edits, and the only sample remaining from the original was The Fall's "Totally Wired."

The edited single was sold through normal retail channels and also offered as a "reward" to anyone who returned a copy of the LP to the JAMs' post office box. The single was released on 16 October 1987, and on 31 October 1987 the JAMs announced that the case with ABBA "is now closed". The sleevenotes to "1987: The JAMs 45 Edits" explain to the purchaser in a rather tongue-in-cheek fashion how to recreate the original 1987 album for themselves:

This record is a version of our now deleted and illegal LP '1987, What The Fuck Is Going On?' with all of the copyright infringing 'samples' edited out. As this leaves less than 25 minutes of music we are able to sell it as a 12-inch 45. If you follow the instructions below you will, after some practice, be able to simulate the sound of our original record. To do this you will need 3 wired-up record decks, a pile of selected discs, one t.v. set and a video machine loaded with a cassette of edited highlights of last weeks 'Top of the Pops'. Deck one is to play this record on, the other two are to scratch in the missing parts using the selected records. For added authentic effect you could use a Roland 808 drum machine (well cheap and what we used in the original recordings) to play along behind your scratching.
