= Brilliant (band) =

British band

- Origin: London, England
- Genres: Rock
- Years active: 1982–1986
- Labels: Limelight Music; Risk Records; Rough Trade; Food; WEA; Atlantic
- Past members: Jimmy Cauty; June Montana; Youth; Ben Watkins; Marcus Myers; Guy Pratt; Stephane Holweck; Andy Anderson; Peter Ogi; Rob Waugh

Brilliant were a British pop/rock group active in the 1980s. Although not commercially successful and not well received by critics, they remain notable because of the personnel involved – Martin Glover a.k.a. Youth of Killing Joke and subsequently a top producer/remixer; Jimmy Cauty, later to find fame and fortune as one half of the KLF; and (prior to the band signing with WEA) Ben Watkins a.k.a. Juno Reactor. Equally notable was their management (David Balfe), their record company A&R manager (Bill Drummond, the other member of the KLF), and songwriting and production team (Mike Stock, Matt Aitken and Pete Waterman known as Stock Aitken Waterman).

== Career ==
Brilliant started in 1982 as post-punk band Killing Joke was crumbling under internal conflicts. Unsatisfied with his bandmates' following of the occult lifestyle, Killing Joke's bass player Youth decided to call it quits and recorded an angry slandering song against his former bandmates. The song, "That's What Good Friends Are For...", a mock of Killing Joke's second album What's THIS for...!, was credited to "Brilliant", which was a name of a Killing Joke B-side and a general 1980s buzzword.

For the first incarnation of Brilliant as a full band, Youth recruited Marcus Myers on vocals and guitar, who left as the record deal was about to be signed, the only vocalist until June Montana took over from backing vocals (joined Hard Rain, Then Jericho, Alisha's Attic) a second bass player Guy Pratt (who left for the Australian band Icehouse and was replaced by Frenchman Stephane "Tin Tin" Holweck (later to form Total Eclipse) prior to their first live performances), and the two drummers Andy Anderson (The Cure) and Peter Ogi, along with synthesist Rob Waugh. They released two singles, "That's What Good Friends Are For..."/"Push" (Limelight Music LIME 001/A/B with a sleeve by Mark Alleyne) and "Colours" (through Rough Trade Records with a sleeve by Mark Manning). They recorded a BBC session for John Peel on 11 October 1982 with a lineup of Youth, Myers, Tin Tin, Anderson and Ogi. Overall through its four years of existence the band included roughly 30 players until reducing to the trio of Youth, Cauty and female vocalist June Montana.

The debut single with this lineup, a cover of James Brown's "It's a Man's Man's World", was critically acclaimed by the music press, and became the group's biggest hit on the UK Singles Chart, peaking at No. 58 in October 1985. The group released their only album Kiss the Lips of Life in 1986, and three further singles, "Love Is War" (UK No. 64), "Somebody" (UK No. 67) and a cover of "The End of the World". The album was produced by the British production team Stock Aitken & Waterman (except the song "Crash the Car"), but it only peaked at No. 83 in the UK Albums Chart. The album was reissued on CD by independent U.S. record label, Wounded Bird, on 11 August 2009.

The band split in late 1986, but group members continued working with each other on subsequent years. Jimmy Cauty and Bill Drummond formed the KLF in 1987. June Montana formed the female duo Disco 2000 with Cauty's wife Cressida, releasing several singles on the KLF Communications label. Youth and Cauty worked together again in the band the Orb.

== Reviews ==
=== Kiss the Lips of Life ===
Trouser Press reviewer Ira Robbins called Kiss the Lips of Life "dismal" and the band "cynical" and "wretched", adding that "[their] lasting cultural significance amounts to its inclusion of ex-Zodiac Mindwarp keyboardist/guitarist Jimmy Cauty, with whom [Bill] Drummond concocted the Justified Ancients of Mu Mu (JAMs)". AllMusic were a little more generous, calling Brilliant an initially "promising act: a more soulful take on the aggressive funk-rock of Killing Joke" but added that, after being teamed up with Stock, Aitken and Waterman, they "came up with a generic pop-dance album that fell well short of the original concept". Awarding Kiss the Lips of Life two stars out of five, they added that "What aggression there is comes courtesy of Jimmy Cauty's metallic guitar solos; the sterile synth whitewash of SAW dominates the rest of the mix, and vocalist June Montana isn't strong or distinctive enough to fight through it". In Music Week, a review of the Kiss the Lips of Life stated that "Brilliant are a very 1986 band with a strong image", but criticized the "lack of punch" and "pale vocals and dance rhythms" on this album. Helen Mead awarded the album a 7/10 score, considering that Brilliant "produce some highly memorable soul with bubbling horns and piano, and some extremely electro-junk full of zappy sound effects"; she also added that with Brilliant "you never get bored", as "they're always trying something different, one minute calm and collected, the next furiously funky".

However, even Bill Drummond – the A&R man who had signed them – had harsh words to say about the project: "I signed a band called Brilliant, who I worked with, we worked together, and it was complete failure. Artistically bankrupt project. And financially deaf. We spent £300,000 on making an album that was useless. Useless artistically, useless... commercially." Pete Waterman said: "We did a record with this band called Brilliant, the reviews were phenomenal and it got to 58 in the charts. I remember saying to the guys, fuck that for critically acclaimed music, you can't pay the fucking rent with that."

=== Singles ===
- "Love Is War"

Jerry Smith of the Music Week magazine praised "Love Is War", produced by SAW, and the cover of "It's a Man's Man's Man's World" as "excellent" songs. Robin Smith of Record Mirror called "Love Is War" a "cumbersome" single with a "pretty disinterested tune, low on atmosphere and extremely diluted". In the same issue of the magazine, James Hamilton stated that "those masters of the soundalike, producers Stock-Aitken-Waterman now copy Change's "Change of Heart" for a purposefully pushing 107 5/6 bpm tense builder". Simon Braithwaite of Smash Hits described the single as a "brilliant" and "powerful dance record" similar to Princess' previous record which "deserve[d] to be a hit". In 2023, Alexis Petridis of The Guardian listed the song at number 17 in his "Stock Aitken Waterman's 20 greatest songs – ranked!", adding: "A more sophisticated, US soul-inspired production style than that which made SAW famous – still sounds great".

- "Somebody"

Regarding "Somebody", Stuart Bailie of Record Mirror noted "the very wonderful June Montano moving more to the front, and Youth involving himself in outside ventures", and said the song "is a fine, but never outstanding, dance track, vaguely reminiscent of Man Parish". Jerry Smith of Music Week considered "Somebody" as being "well constructed and produced", but "not as powerful as previous singles".

== Discography ==
=== Albums ===
- Kiss the Lips of Life (1986), WEA/Food Records/Atlantic - UK No. 83

=== Singles ===
- "That's What Good Friends Are For..."/"Push" (1982), Limelight Music - UK Indie No. 22
- "Colours" (A.Anderson/M.Glover/M.Myer/S.Holweck)/"Colours Monster Mix" (1983), Risk Records/Rough Trade - UK Indie No. 11
- "Soul Murder" (1984), Food Records - UK Indie No. 14
- "Wait for It" (1984), WEA/Food Records
- "It's a Man's Man's Man's World" (1985), WEA/Food Records - UK No. 58
- "Love Is War" (Youth/Montana/Cauty/Stock/Aitken/Waterman)/"The Red Red Groovy" (Youth/Montana/Cauty)/"Ruby Fruit Jungle" (Youth/Montana/Cauty/Holwick/Le Mesurier) (1986), WEA/Food Records - UK No. 64
- "Somebody" (1986), WEA/Food Records/Atlantic - UK No. 67
- "The End of the World" (1986), WEA/Food Records
