= White label record =

Type of vinyl record labeling

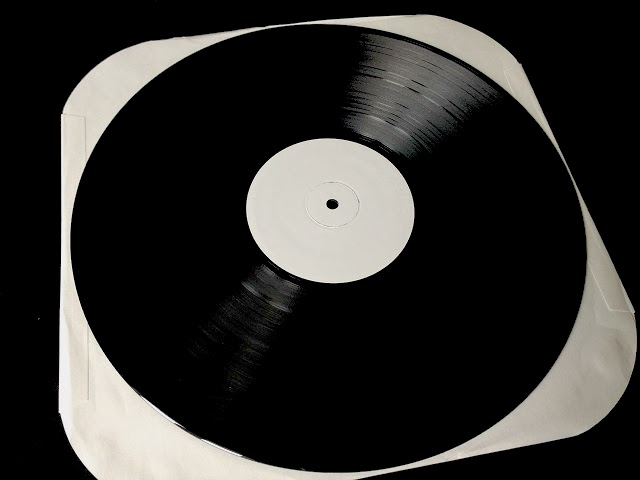
A plain white label 12" vinyl

A white label record is a vinyl record with white labels attached. There are several variations each with a different purpose. Variations include test pressings, white label promos, and plain white labels.

== Test pressings ==
Test pressings, usually with test pressing written on the label, with catalogue number, artist and recording time or date, are the first vinyl discs made at the factory. Such discs are produced in very small quantities (usually no more than 5 or 6 copies) to evaluate the quality of the disc before mass production begins. A review of the test pressing may expose problems with the tape to disc transfer (mastering) and helps to ensure that the defective discs do not reach the public.

== Promotional recordings ==
In the United States, the term white label promo (often abbreviated as WLP) refers to a promotional pressing with a label that has mostly the same text and label logo/artwork as the commercial label, but with a white background instead of the color label or artwork found on commercial pressings. These are usually pressed in quantities of only a few thousand per title. Such copies may also contain biographies or pictures of the musical artists. Promotional copies are for distribution to journalists, music distributors or radio stations in order to assess consumer opinion.

== Plain white labels ==
White label discs can be used to anonymously promote new artists or upcoming albums by veteran artists. In some cases plain white labels are issued to conceal artist identities (examples of this include songs by Traci Lords and La Toya Jackson), whose record companies issued white labels so that DJs would have no pre-conceived notions about the music from the artist name. Many dance music producers press copies of white labels in order to test crowd response in dance clubs to their own musical productions.

== Use in house music and hip hop ==
Today, white label records are usually produced in small amounts (fewer than 300) by small record companies or DJs and are most popular with club and hip-hop music DJs. In the early 1990s, hardcore techno and house artists created tracks in home or local studios and had five-hundred or a few thousand singles pressed on 12" white labels, which were easy to sell at dance music record stores.

Steve Beckett of Warp Records recalls that "shops would take fifty white labels off you for five pounds each, no problem. Dance music was all imports, then people in Britain started doing it for themselves, and their tracks started to get better than the tunes in America." Record labels like Warp, and Shut Up and Dance, were begun as white-label enterprises, providing cutting-edge dance music to pirate radio stations and music stores.

== Copyright and royalties ==
Some white labels may contain unauthorized remixes or other recordings which are not licensed for release. Recordings not authorized by the artist or label are often called "bootlegs". White labels are referred to as "promos" (short for "promotional copies") that many top-name DJs receive and play weeks or months prior to the day of general release to the public. As artists using samples pay high fees for the privilege of such, they must be able to gauge the market potential of their tracks prior to approval. Recently, smaller promo services offer record companies a more economical means of distribution although these companies may not have the means to properly protect releases from illegal copying.

The industry itself seems to be aware of this necessity and white labels are commonly accepted as a necessary evil within the industry, which has only prosecuted a small number of those artists using white labeled pressings of uncleared samples and compositions.

== See also ==
- White-label product
- Private label
- Generic brand
- The record mastering and pressing process
- Record label
- Music industry
