= Solid State Logik =

2021 greatest hits album by the KLF

- Cover of Solid State Logik 1

Greatest hits album by the KLF
- Released: 1 January 2021 (SSL 1); 22 March 2021 (SSL 2)
- Recorded: 1988–2017
- Studio: Trancentral
- Genre: House; electronica
- Length: 30:03 (part 1); 63:53 (part 2)
- Label: KLF Communications
- Producer: Jimmy Cauty; Bill Drummond

The KLF chronology
The Black Room (Unreleased)	Solid State Logik (2021)	Come Down Dawn (2021)

Alternative cover
- Cover of Solid State Logik 2

Solid State Logik is a 2021 two-part digital compilation album by British electronic band the KLF, released to streaming services on KLF Communications, in a series of six planned official compilations, Samplecity thru Trancentral. Part 1, subtitled 7″ Hit Singles 1988–1991, was released on 1 January 2021, and part 2, subtitled 12″ Master Mixes 1988–2017, was released on 23 March 2021.

The first part of Solid State Logik marked the first time the KLF's music has been commercially available since the band deleted their entire catalog in 1992.

== Background ==
On 16 January 2013, several albums by the KLF (Chill Out, Space, the original 1997 bootleg of the original version of The White Room, as well as the Lost Sounds of Mu bootlegs) showed up on streaming platforms, but turned out to be unofficial and were deleted the next day. In 2018, Billboard mentioned the KLF amongst artists notably absent from major streaming services.

The story surrounding the creation of Solid State Logik started around 2017, when two bootleg compilations claiming to be official KLF hit compilations, entitled Songs Collection and The Works, appeared on streaming services. These were removed in December 2020, several days before the release of Solid State Logik 1.

On 31 December 2020, the release of Solid State Logik 1 (with the title referencing Solid State Logic, a manufacturer of mixing consoles) was announced via graffiti and posters featuring the KLF logo, hung under a railway bridge on Kingsland Road in Shoreditch, East London. The 30-minute collection of eight remastered and slightly re-edited single versions appeared at midnight 1 January 2021, on music streaming platforms, while high-definition videos were published for the first time on the band's newly established official YouTube channel, marking the first activity of Jimmy Cauty and Bill Drummond as the KLF since 1992.

Solid State Logik 1 includes a previously unreleased version of "3 a.m. Eternal" with British extreme metal band Extreme Noise Terror, from the abandoned KLF album The Black Room (1990–1992). The song was performed live at the 1992 BRIT Awards, causing controversy by firing blanks from machine guns into the audience.

=== Further releases ===
The Kingsland Road posters also announced further "non-consecutive chapters" of reissues, under the overall title Samplecity thru Trancentral, including a second part of Solid State Logik, along with subsequent collections: Kick-Out D’Jams, Pure Trance Series, Come Down Dawn, and Moody Boys Selected. The material is suggested to feature music released originally under the names: the KLF, the JAMs, the Justified Ancients of Mu Mu, and the Timelords. The posters mentioned outtakes, hinting at the reissues to also feature previously unreleased material.

== Track listing ==
Solid State Logik 1: 7″ Hit Singles 1988–1991
No.	Title	Credited to	Length
1.	"Doctorin' the Tardis"	The Timelords	3:36
2.	"What Time Is Love? (Live at Trancentral)"	The KLF	3:56
3.	"3 a.m. Eternal (Live at the S.S.L.)"	The KLF	3:52
4.	"Last Train to Trancentral (Live from the Lost Continent)"	The KLF	3:52
5.	"It's Grim Up North"	The Justified Ancients of Mu Mu	4:04
6.	"America: What Time Is Love?"	The KLF	4:07
7.	"Justified & Ancient (Stand by The JAMs)"	The KLF featuring Tammy Wynette	3:48
8.	"3 a.m. Eternal" (From The Black Room)	The Justified Ancients of Mu Mu vs Extreme Noise Terror	2:48
Total length:			30:03

- Track 2 is an uncensored version of the 7″ radio edit.
- Tracks 4 and 7 are new edits.
- Track 6 is the USA 7″ mix.

Solid State Logik 2: 12″ Master Mixes 1988–2017
No.	Title	Credited to	Length
1.	"Kylie Said to Jason" (7″ A-side)		4:34
2.	"What Time Is Love? (Live at Trancentral)" (12″ A-side)		5:25
3.	"3 a.m. Eternal (Live at the S.S.L.)" (12″ A-side)		5:54
4.	"Last Train to Trancentral (Live from the Lost Continent)" (12″ A-side)		5:35
5.	"It's Grim Up North" (12″ A-side)	The Justified Ancients of Mu Mu	10:32
6.	"America: What Time Is Love?" (12″ A-side)		9:01
7.	"Justified & Ancient (Stand by The JAMs)" (12″ A-side)		5:31
8.	"America No More" (12″ B-side)		6:03
9.	"K Cera Cera (War Is Over If You Want It)" (12″ A-side)	K Foundation & The Red Army Choir	4:34
10.	"The Magnificent"	The One World Orchestra featuring the Massed Pipes and Drums of the Children's Free Revolutionary Volunteer Guard	2:15
11.	"Jarvis Joins the JAMs (Trailer)" (featuring Jarvis Cocker)	The Justified Ancients of Mu Mu	4:29
Total length:			63:53

- Track 1 is a new edit restoring the third verse into a slightly edited 7″ mix.
- Track 5 is different to the 1991 version, with changes most prominent in the closing "Jerusalem on the Moors" section.
- Track 7 is incorrectly labelled as the "Make Mine a 99" deep house remix by Tony Thorpe. The mix is actually the extended 12″ "Stand by The JAMs" mix.
- Track 11 previously unreleased.
