= Come Down Dawn =

2021 album by the KLF

Studio album (reissue) by The KLF
- Released: 4 February 2021
- Recorded: 1989
- Studio: Trancentral
- Genre: Ambient house; chill-out
- Length: 38:48
- Label: KLF Communications
- Producer: Jimmy Cauty; Bill Drummond

The KLF chronology
Solid State Logik (2021)	Come Down Dawn (2021)	The White Room (Director's Cut) (2021)

Come Down Dawn (subtitled Brooklyn to Mexico City 1990) is a 2021 reissue of the 1990 studio album Chill Out by British electronic music duo The KLF. Released to streaming services on 4 February 2021 under their alias The Justified Ancients of Mu Mu, it is the second in a series of six official compilations Samplecity thru Trancentral, after Solid State Logik 1 from 1 January 2021.

Come Down Dawn is the second commercial release of the KLF's music since the band deleted their entire catalog in 1992. The album is a re-edited version of the 1990 album Chill Out, with expired licensed samples from the original release removed in the mix.

== Background ==
The album continues the series of re-releases on music streaming platforms, announced on a graffiti and posters under a railway bridge on Kingsland Road in East London, following the release of Solid State Logik 1, the collection of remastered and re-edited hit singles, and videos published for the first time on YouTube.

Come Down Dawn is a re-edited version of the 1990 album Chill Out, with a selection of prominent samples from the original release removed. The omissions include a BBC Radio 1 jingle from the Friday Rock Show featuring Tommy Vance, and direct excerpts from the 1961 composition "Stranger on the Shore" by Acker Bilk, the 1968 song "Albatross" by Fleetwood Mac, the 1989 song "After the Love" by Jesus Loves You (both from "3 a.m. Somewhere out of Beaumont"), and the 1969 song "In the Ghetto" by Elvis Presley (from "Elvis on the Radio, Steel Guitar in My Soul").

The only addition on Come Down Dawn mixed into the original content of Chill Out is "What Time Is Love? (Virtual Reality Mix)," originally released on the KLF 1990 remix EP What Time Is Love? (Remodelled & Remixed).

Instead of original titles of Chill Out, all newly re-edited tracks on Come Down Dawn are retitled to signify, according to the band, subsequent stages of their 43-hour journey from 1990, that run "from the Reverend Doctor Wade's tabernacle in Brooklyn to the Mesoamerican Pyramids near Mexico City.

All tracks were recorded live at their Trancentral studio in late 1989, and feature Graham Lee on pedal steel guitar.

== Track listing ==
No.	Title	Original tracks	Length
1.	"Brooklyn to Atlantic City"	"Brownsville Turnaround on the Tex-Mex Border", "Pulling out of Ricardo and the Dusk Is Falling Fast"	3:31
2.	"Atlantic City to Philadelphia"	"Six Hours to Louisiana, Black Coffee Going Cold"	2:40
3.	"Philadelphia to Baltimore"	"Dream Time in Lake Jackson"	2:37
4.	"Baltimore to Fair Play"	"Madrugada Eterna"	7:45
5.	"Fair Play to North Druid Hills"	"Justified and Ancient Seems a Long Time Ago"	1:03
6.	"North Druid Hills to Atlanta"	"3 a.m. Somewhere Out of Beaumont"	3:36
7.	"Atlanta to Mobile"	"Wichita Lineman Was a Song I Once Heard" "Trancentral Lost in My Mind"	7:15
8.	"Mobile to Houston"	"What Time Is Love? (Virtual Reality Mix)"	2:10
9.	"Houston to Laredo"	"What Time Is Love? (Virtual Reality Mix)"	2:16
10.	"Laredo to El Prado"	"What Time Is Love? (Virtual Reality Mix)"	1:29
11.	"El Prado to San Rafael"	"What Time Is Love? (Virtual Reality Mix)"	1:37
12.	"San Rafael to Mexico City"	"The Lights of Baton Rouge Pass By" "Alone Again with the Dawn Coming Up"	2:49
Total length:			38:48
