= It's Grim Up North =

1991 single by The Justified Ancients of Mu Mu

Single by The Justified Ancients of Mu Mu
- Released: 28 October 1991
- Recorded: Trancentral
- Genre: Industrial techno
- Length: 4:04 (radio edit); 10:03 (extended)
- Label: KLF Communications (UK)
- Songwriters: Jimmy Cauty; Bill Drummond
- Producer: The KLF

Drummond and Cauty singles chronology
"America: What Time Is Love?" (1991)	"It's Grim Up North" (1991)	"Justified & Ancient (Stand by The JAMs)" (1991)

Music video
- "It's Grim Up North" on YouTube

"It's Grim Up North" is a song by British electronic band The Justified Ancients of Mu Mu (The JAMs). The song was originally released as a limited edition "Club Mix" in December 1990 with Pete Wylie on vocals. A re-recorded version, with Bill Drummond on vocals, was released commercially in October 1991. These recordings were the first releases by Drummond and his creative partner Jimmy Cauty under the JAMs moniker since the 1988 compilation album Shag Times, and their final releases under that name. Between Shag Times and "It's Grim Up North", they had operated as the Timelords and the KLF. The 1991 single release reached No. 10 on the UK Singles Chart and entered the top 10 in Denmark and Finland.

The lyrics to "It's Grim Up North" list towns and cities in the North of England, set to a pounding industrial techno beat and percussion reminiscent of steam whistles. The 1991 version segues into an orchestral instrumental of the hymn "Jerusalem". A recurring theme of "It's Grim Up North" was drab greyness, representing the dreary, overcast skies of the "grim" North. The original single featuring Pete Wylie was pressed on grey vinyl, and the same colour was retained for the sleeve of the 1991 release. The video for "It's Grim Up North" was filmed in black and white, and shows The Justified Ancients of Mu Mu performing in the pouring rain.

"It's Grim Up North" was planned to be a prominent track on the JAM's album The Black Room, but the album was never completed.

== Background ==
Music-industry figure Bill Drummond and artist/musician Jimmy Cauty began recording together in 1987 as The Justified Ancients of Mu Mu (also known as The JAMs), naming themselves after the fictional conspiratorial group "The Justified Ancients of Mummu" from The Illuminatus! Trilogy. In 1988, they had their first UK number one hit single—Doctorin' the Tardis—as The Timelords, after which they transitioned into The KLF. "It's Grim Up North" was released commercially by the Justified Ancients of Mu Mu in 1991, in the middle of a run of upbeat house records by the KLF which would see Cauty and Drummond become the biggest-selling singles act in the world that year.

== Theme ==
A screenshot from the "It's Grim Up North" video, filmed in black and white. The JAMs perform in the rain, in the dark and "grim" North. Bill Drummond is pictured centre, Jimmy Cauty is on the far right and an unknown drummer is behind Cauty near the speakers.

"It's Grim Up North", with its markedly darker tone than the KLF records, was planned to be a prominent track on the ultimately unreleased album The Black Room, an album which Cauty said would be "so heavy it will just pin you to the floor" and which Drummond said would be the "yang to the yin" of The White Room, released in March 1991.

A recurring theme of "It's Grim Up North" was drab greyness, representing the dreary, overcast skies of the "grim" North. The original issue featuring Pete Wylie was on grey vinyl, and the same colour was retained for the sleeve of the 1991 release (pictured above). The video for "It's Grim Up North" was filmed in black and white, and shows The Justified Ancients of Mu Mu performing in the pouring rain. King Boy D (Drummond) voices the words into the microphone of a backpack field radio worn by a child shop mannequin at his side wearing military uniform and a helmet labelled "KLF". Rockman Rock (Cauty) is shown playing bass guitar as well as an unnamed drummer in the background wearing a hoodie. Cars and trucks rush by, leaving a trail of spray because evidently The JAMs are performing on one lane of a road; they are lit by the headlights of several nearby stationary vehicles. As the performance draws to a close, and the strains of Jerusalem can be heard, the slogan "The North will rise again" appears on screen.

The sleevenotes further elaborated on The JAMs' inspiration: "Through the downpour and diesel roar, Rockman and Kingboy D can feel a regular dull thud. Whether this is the eternal echo of a Victorian steam driven revolution or the turbo kick of a distant Northern rave is irrelevant. Thus inspired, The JAMS climb into the back of their truck and work."

== Composition ==
"It's Grim up North (Radio Edit)"
The composition consists of a pounding and often discordant industrial techno in mixed time signatures, over which is spoken a roll-call of Northern England's industrial towns and cities

"It's Grim Up North (Part 1)" is a 10-minute composition with two distinct segueing sections. The seven-minute first section is a heavy, pounding industrial techno track, over which Drummond lists the names of some towns and cities in the North of England. Between verses, Drummond's distorted voice urgently alerts the listener that "It's grim up north". The instrumentation is in a minor key and is frequently discordant, featuring synthesised sounds reminiscent of passing heavy goods vehicles and train whistles. Although the underlying rhythm keeps a 4/4 time signature, several instruments keep 3/16 and 3/4 time throughout the track, including a deep second drum line—the "regular dull thud"—which juxtaposes when the 4/4 instruments and percussion drop out. The second section is a fully orchestrated arrangement of Jerusalem, with the sounds of brass, strings, organs, drums and choir. The instrumentation and vocals of the first section gradually diminish to nothing over a period of nearly two minutes. Following the climax of the hymn, howling wind and crow calls are heard and then fade out.

"It's Grim Up North (Part 2)" is a six-minute reprise of the techno themes from Part 1, without the vocals and orchestra. The CD single track "Jerusalem on the Moors" comprises the orchestral arrangement of Jerusalem, beginning alongside a fadeout of the industrial techno instrumentation.

== Release ==
"It's Grim Up North" was first previewed in December 1990, as a limited edition "Club Mix" with Pete Wylie on vocals. A re-recorded version with Bill Drummond on vocals received a regular release on KLF Communications in October 1991, peaking at No. 10 on the UK Singles Chart. These recordings were the first releases under The KLF's "JAMs" pseudonym since the 1988 compilation album Shag Times, and were to be the last under that name.

The JAMs used a photograph of graffiti reading "It's Grim Up North" to advertise their single in the 2 November 1991 edition of the NME; the graffiti – painted on a bridge over the northbound carriageway of the M1 motorway – had been the subject of an early day motion in the House of Commons of the United Kingdom on 21 October 1991. The JAMs "categorically denied" to the same publication that they were responsible for the vandalism.

== Critical reception ==
Record Mirror hailed the original club version as "the hardest rave track of the year" and as "one mind-blowing mental onslaught".

In awarding the 1991 release "single of the week", NME said: "The Scotsman [Drummond] picks over the place names with gruesome relish, the backing track pummels and tweaks, blasts and buffets him round the furthest God-forsaken reaches of this demi-paradise, this land of kings, this sceptred isle, this England... A thing of feverish, fiendish irreverence and conceptual genius...".

In a 2007 article on readers recommendations for songs about northern England, Dorian Lynskey in The Guardian said that "It's Grim Up North" "wrongfoots the listener. A deadpan catalogue of northern towns, recited over rainy-motorway techno, suddenly blossoms into a rendition of Blake's Jerusalem, as if arriving at some socialist rave utopia.".

In 2005, Freaky Trigger placed it at number 81 in their list of "The Top 100 Songs of All Time," with a writer for the webzine saying the record is "not a fucking joke. It’s the best British single of the 1990s." In 1999, the website's founder Tom Ewing also included the song at number 75 in his list of the "Top 100 Singles of the 1990s", saying "“It’s Grim Up North” is a document of one of pop's most individual bands at their imaginative peak. It boils down to a man in his late 30s, and a mate, doing exactly what they want to do, without fear or compromise or cant, and getting it into the Top 40 to boot. And that makes this not only an excellent single, but a genuinely inspirational one".

== Locations ==
All locations are in the north of England, predominantly in Cheshire, Yorkshire, Lancashire, Merseyside and Greater Manchester and others in Cumbria, Derbyshire, North Lincolnshire and North-East Lincolnshire. Although officially, Buxton and Glossop are within the East Midlands region, they are often considered part of the North because of their closer links to Manchester and Stockport than Derby and the rest of the East Midlands.

First verse

"Bolton, Barnsley, Nelson, Colne, Burnley, Bradford, Buxton, Crewe, Warrington, Widnes, Wigan, Leeds, Northwich, Nantwich, Knutsford, Hull, Sale, Salford, Southport, Leigh, Kirkby, Kearsley, Keighley, Maghull, Harrogate, Huddersfield, Oldham, Lancs (Lancaster), Grimsby, Glossop, Hebden Bridge."

Second verse

This verse appears in the full length version only; it is not present on the radio edit.

"Brighouse, Bootle, Featherstone, Speke, Runcorn, Rotherham, Rochdale, Barrow, Morecambe, Macclesfield, Lytham St Annes, Clitheroe, Cleethorpes, the M62."

Third verse

"Pendlebury, Prestwich, Preston, York, Skipton, Scunthorpe, Scarborough-on-Sea, Chester, Chorley, Cheadle Hulme (could also be interpreted as the equally valid Cheadle, Hulme), Ormskirk, Accrington, Stanley (could also be interpreted as the football club, Accrington Stanley F.C.), and Leigh, Ossett, Otley, Ilkley Moor, Sheffield, Manchester, Castleford, Skem (Skelmersdale), Doncaster, Dewsbury, Halifax (split into two parts to fit the measures as "Hally... fax"), Bingley, Bramhall, are all in the North."

== Formats and track listings ==
"It's Grim Up North" was originally released as a limited-edition one-side promotional 12" on 17 December 1990. Reworked with Drummond's vocals, the track was given a European single release on 28 October 1991. The CD single track "Jerusalem on the Moors" comprises the orchestral arrangement of Jerusalem, beginning alongside a fadeout of the industrial techno instrumentation. The single's formats and track listings are tabulated below:

Format (and countries)	Track number			
Format (and countries)	1	2	3	4
One-sided 12" promo single (UK) (limited edition of 350)	O			
7" single (UK, Germany, Denmark, Belgium), cassette single (UK)	p1	p2		
12" single (UK, Germany, Denmark, Belgium)	P1	P2		
CD single (UK, Germany, Denmark)	p1	P1	P2	J

Key

- O – "It's Grim up North" (original club mix) (8:38)
- p1 – "It's Grim up North (Part 1)" (radio edit) (4:04)
- P1 – "It's Grim up North (Part 1)" (10:03)
- p2 – "It's Grim up North (Part 2)" (radio edit) (3:37)
- P2 – "It's Grim up North (Part 2)" (6:13)
- J – "Jerusalem on the Moors" (3:04)

== Personnel (1991 commercial release) ==
- The Justified Ancients of Mu-Mu (Jimmy Cauty, Bill Drummond & unaccredited drummer): Performance
- The KLF (Jimmy Cauty, Bill Drummond): Production
- Mark "Spike" Stent assisted by Jeremy Wheatley: Mix
- Nick Coler: Conductor

All songs written by Jimmy Cauty and Bill Drummond.

Source: JAMS 028CD sleeve notes

== Charts ==
Chart (1991–1992)	Peak position
Australia (ARIA)	136
Denmark (IFPI)	9
Europe (Eurochart Hot 100)	34
Finland (Suomen virallinen lista)	5
Switzerland (Schweizer Hitparade)	26
UK Singles (OCC)	10
UK Airplay (Music Week)	16
UK Dance (Music Week)	12
UK Club Chart (Record Mirror)	9
