= The Black Room (album) =

Unreleased studio album by the Justified Ancients of Mu Mu

Studio album (unfinished) by the Justified Ancients of Mu Mu
- Released: Unreleased
- Recorded: 1990–1992
- Genre: Electronica; industrial techno; thrash metal; grindcore
- Label: KLF Communications

The KLF chronology
The White Room (1991)	The Black Room (Unreleased)	Solid State Logik (2021)

The Black Room is an unfinished studio album recorded by the Justified Ancients of Mu Mu (Bill Drummond and Jimmy Cauty), intended to be the follow-up to their KLF album The White Room.

== History ==
The Black Room was referred to in interviews even before The White Room was released. Originally it was planned to be hardcore techno (in the style of and featuring the original version of "It's Grim Up North"), then electro-metal (like "America: What Time Is Love?") and finally it was to be a thrash metal collaboration with Extreme Noise Terror. It is unknown how much of each incarnation was complete before it was scrapped and recording was restarted.

Jimmy Cauty said of it in December 1990: "The 'Black Room' album will all be this kind of electro turbo metal. It's not really industrial like, say, Throbbing Gristle, because it's coming from house and has an uplifting vibe about it. But it's so heavy it will just pin you to the floor." Bill Drummond said of it in 1991: "It's the complete yang to the yin of The White Room. It'll be very very dense, very very hardcore. No sort of 'up' choruses or anthems. I think it's going to be techno-metal, I think that's gonna be the sound. Techno-metal. Which'll be... a cross between techno and heavy metal. Megadeth with drum machines."

At some point, grindcore band Extreme Noise Terror (ENT) were employed, and the two bands were still recording in February 1992 when the KLF scrapped the sessions. "What actually happened," said ENT singer Dean, "was that Bill heard us on [John] Peel when he was in the bath and got in touch. They had wanted to do rock versions of their songs with Motörhead but something fell through, so he rang us... The message said it's Bill from The KLF, but I thought they said 'the ALF' so I didn't take much notice... Later, we got another message saying it was definitely Bill from The KLF and I said 'fuck off! What does he want with us?' But it all got explained eventually." Asked how they found working with "the pop genius of the age", the band agreed on a party line: "Just say that he's mad, barking bleedin' mad..."

Mark Stent, the engineer/producer for these sessions, thought the music was pure genius. "The most awesome track for me was one called 'The Black Room and Terminator 10' which was like a very slow tempo thrash. It was mad. It was brilliant, absolutely brilliant, and it would have shown a lot of people up because it was as ballsy as hell. Guitars screaming all over the place, Bill doing his vocals and Dean (of ENT) doing his. There was such a raw power to it. It was so different from anything anyone else had ever heard. This was really heavy."

One track was released from this collaboration, a metal version of "3 a.m. Eternal". The two bands also performed together at the 1992 Brit Awards ceremony, a performance which NME listed at number 4 in their "top 100 rock moments". However, the rest of the album was never completed and remains unreleased.

== Bad Wisdom ==
In Bad Wisdom, Drummond writes:

Z asks about the Black Room album that me and Jimmy as The Justified Ancients of Mu Mu started but were too afraid to complete. I tell him how, when I was standing in the twilight of the recording booth, the microphone in front of me, Jimmy's magnificent metal guitar riffs roaring in my headphones, a voice came out of me which I had never heard before, words flowed that I had never written and a precipice appeared before me. I crept forward and looked over the edge: the abyss. The Justified Ancients of Mu Mu's LP, The Black Room, was never finished. But Z keeps talking and I'm warming to his persuasions. He feels that Jimmy and I are evading our responsibilities; we should return to our war-horse and complete the task. And yes, right now I believe Z may be right. But maybe Jimmy and I should wait until we are both over fifty before we record the sound of us as battle-scarred veterans of a hundred mercenary campaigns, when the music would not be drawn from our fading libidos but from the horror of life spent confronting that abyss – kinda like Milton backed up by Megadeth.

== Bootlegs ==
Instrumental outtakes purportedly from the February 1992 Black Room sessions circulate. However, they have been impossible to verify since they are guitar parts only and feature none of Drummond's vocals. Asked if the sessions would ever be released, Cauty said "There is a bootleg flying around. I haven't heard it. I thought I had the only copy, but I guess there might have been another one made."
