= The "What Time Is Love?" Story =

Compilation album by the KLF
- Released: 25 September 1989
- Recorded: 1988–1989
- Studio: Trancentral
- Genre: Electronica; acid house; new beat
- Length: 39:23
- Label: KLF Communications
- Producer: The KLF

The KLF chronology
Shag Times (1989)	The "What Time Is Love?" Story (1989)	Chill Out (1990)

Professional ratings
Review scores
Source	Rating
New Musical Express	8/10
Q	3/5 stars
Spin Alternative Record Guide	5/10

The "What Time Is Love?" Story is a compilation album by British electronic music duo the KLF, comprising six versions of their techno track "What Time Is Love?"

== Origin ==
By 1989, the popularity of the "Pure Trance Original" of "What Time Is Love?" in European clubs had reportedly spawned eighteen unauthorised cover versions and sound-alikes. In a novel move, some of these were collated by the Orb's Alex Paterson at the KLF's behest, and released as a compilation album entitled The "What Time Is Love?" Story, which was sold commercially for half the price of a conventional album.

Released on 25 September 1989 on LP and CD, The "What Time Is Love?" Story used the same basic design lay-out as the "Pure Trance Original" singles, but the colour scheme was altered: lurid pink writing on lurid green (for the vinyl), and lurid green on lurid pink (for the CD).

== Authorship ==
Many commentators have speculated that all of these 'covers' were in fact the work of the KLF themselves. Q magazine, for example, commented that "one wonders why all the vocalists sound so alike (and British, even when praising Allah)" and asked of their readers "wouldn't it be a good scam if you released 18 differing versions scattered across Europe?" However, of the artists featuring on the LP, all possess an independent discography: Liaisons D, a collective that includes techno producer Frank De Wulf, has an extensive discography; Neon is Belgian producer Jean Pierre Bulté of Target Records; Dr. Felix is a pseudonym of Italian producer Claudio Donato. And finally, K.L.F.S., albeit being a one-off shoot, was actually the brainchild of two Italian Hi-NRG producers M. Parmigiani and Marcello Catalano.

The album also includes a live version of "What Time Is Love?", performed at the "Land Of Oz", the chill-out room of the London nightclub Heaven, where Paterson regularly DJed alongside the KLF co-founder Jimmy Cauty. The track was recorded on 31 July 1989, one week after a single release of further "What Time Is Love?" remixes. The date also marked the release of the KLF's pop single "Kylie Said to Jason".

== Track listing ==
1. The KLF — "What Time Is Love?" (Original) – 7:05
2. Dr. Felix — "Relax Your Body" – 6:32
3. K.L.F.S. — "What Time Is Love?" (Italian Mix) – 6:10
4. Liaisons D. — "Heartbeat" – 5:55
5. Neon — "No Limit" (Dance Mix 4'58) – 4:58
6. The KLF — "What Time Is Love?" (Live at the Land of Oz) – 8:43
