= Chill Out (KLF album) =

Studio album by the KLF
- Released: 5 February 1990
- Studio: Trancentral
- Genres: Ambient; ambient house; sound collage
- Length: 44:43
- Label: KLF Communications
- Producer: The KLF

The KLF chronology
The "What Time Is Love?" Story (1989)	Chill Out (1990)	The White Room (1991)

Chill Out is the third studio album by British electronic music group the KLF, released on 5 February 1990. Their first album after changing their name from "the Justified Ancients of Mu Mu", it is an ambient-styled concept album featuring an extensive selection of samples, portraying a mythical night-time journey throughout the U.S. Gulf Coast states, beginning in Texas and ending in Louisiana. Chill Out was conceived as a continuous piece of music, with original KLF music interwoven with samples from songs by Elvis Presley, Fleetwood Mac, Acker Bilk, Van Halen, 808 State and field recordings of Tuvan throat singers.

== Context ==
Chill Out was released during the KLF's ambient phase, and was credited by Bob Stanley for pioneering ambient house, drawing attention to the album's mix of "train noises, post-punk dub and pre-punk Floyd." It has also been described as a sound collage, with its blend of sound effects, environmental noise, throat singing and musical samples.

=== Composition and recording ===
"Madrugada Eterna" first appeared on the 1989 single "Kylie Said to Jason".

According to the sleeve notes, Chill Out was recorded "live on location" at Trancentral, the "spiritual home of the KLF", their studio in the basement of KLF member Jimmy Cauty's squat in Stockwell, South London.

The KLF have stated that the album was recorded in a 44-minute live take. In an interview Jimmy Cauty stated that, "There's no edits on it. Quite a few times we'd get near the end and make a mistake and so we'd have to go all the way back to the beginning and set it all up again". According to Cauty's co-founder of the KLF, Bill Drummond, the album took two days to put together. Record Collector compared the KLF's production method to that of established electronic musicians: "While electronic dinosaurs like Jean Michel Jarre and Klaus Schulze were walling themselves in with banks and banks of synthesizers, computers and electronic gadgetry the KLF were doing the opposite—making a crafted work like Chill Out with the bare necessities of musical survival."

After recording, the duo thought the sound to be evocative of a trip through the American Deep South. Drummond said "I've never been to those places. I don't know what those places are like, but in my head, I can imagine those sounds coming from those places, just looking at the map." The titles of the parts are poetic descriptions—often complete sentences—incorporating statements of time, place and situation along the Gulf Coast journey.

Chill Out is a single continuous musical piece having many distinctive sections, each of which either segues into or introduces the next. The album as a whole is a progression, with percussion gradually introduced during the second half. The album has many recurring musical elements, which unify and merge the parts into the collective whole. Common characteristics of most parts include ethereal background synthesizers, the use of echo and pitch bend, samples of nature and transport, and the punctuation of soft synthesizer loops by sudden flourishes of harmonious sound. The Deep South is variously represented using original pedal steel contributions from Graham Lee and emotionally charged samples of US radio broadcasts: an evangelist's sermon, a range of samples of a very intense salesman, and, in "Madrugada Eterna", (Note: "Madrugada Eterna" is Spanish for "Eternal Dawn".) a detailed news report of the road accident in Wantagh that resulted in the death of 17-year-old Jack Atsidakos.

Despite the specific US settings, Chill Out is multi-ethnic, its journey taking in pastoral shepherds, Russian broadcasts, Tuvan throat singers ("Dream Time in Lake Jackson"), exotic birds, and an African-sounding original female vocal from the JAMs' 1987 (What the Fuck Is Going On?) that later became the KLF's "Justified and Ancient".

Elements of the KLF's "Pure Trance" singles "3 a.m. Eternal" and "Last Train to Trancentral" are brought to the fore during the second half of the album, progressing from the minimalist synths of the opening half. Similarly, samples of other artists' work appear as the composition develops, harmonising with the KLF's original instrumentation.

=== Identified samples ===
The samples used in Chill Out contribute fundamentally to the character of the composition. In particular, the recurring sampled sound effects of rolling stock and other transport illustrate the journey concept, often during segues between parts of the composition. Many of these effects are taken from the 1987 CD version of Elektra Records' Authentic Sound Effects Volume 2. The tracks used are "Crossing Bells and Horn with Electric Train Pass" and "Short Freight Train Pass", along with processed versions of "F18 Diamond Fly-By", "Dodge Van Starts, Drives Out", and "Surf". Samples of American, British and Russian radio stations are also used, including the BBC pips and a jingle from Tommy Vance's Friday Rock Show on BBC Radio 1: "Rock radio into the nineties and beyond". Some of the more obscure sounds (Tuvan throat singers and Basque shepherds in the Pyrenees) come from the Saydisc Records soundtrack of the 1980s Disappearing World series on Granada TV in the UK. The phrase "Your feeling of helplessness is your best friend, savage" is taken from the 1957 science fiction film The Brain from Planet Arous.

The album features samples of distinctive melodies from the musical recordings of other artists: Elvis Presley's 1969 UK No. 2 single "In the Ghetto", Fleetwood Mac's 1968 UK No. 1 single "Albatross", as well as "Oh Well Part II", and Acker Bilk's 1961 US No. 1 single "Stranger on the Shore" all feature prominently, in each case set to an accompaniment of original music. The composers of these hits receive co-writing credit for "Elvis on the Radio Steel Guitar in My Soul", "3am Somewhere out of Beaumont", and "A Melody from a Past Life Keeps Pulling Me Back" respectively, and the performers are thanked in the Chill Out sleevenotes. Boy George's band Jesus Loves You is also thanked for a sample from the single "After the Love", which also features on "3am Somewhere out of Beaumont". Short samples from the Van Halen instrumental "Eruption" emerge throughout the songs "A Melody from a Past Life Keeps Pulling Me Back" and "Rock Radio into the Nineties and Beyond". Shortly after the 2:00 mark of "The Lights of Baton Rouge Pass By", a sample from the theme music of the 1958 film The Big Country can be heard as well as "Pacific State" by 808 State.

== Reception ==
Professional ratings
Review scores
Source	Rating
AllMusic	5/5 stars
NME	8/10
Pitchfork	8.9/10
Q	(1990) (1994)
Record Mirror	4/5
The Rolling Stone Album Guide	4/5 stars
Sounds	2/5 stars
Spin Alternative Record Guide	9/10
Sputnikmusic	4.5/5
Uncut	5/5 stars

Ian Cranna of Q drew comparisons to OMD and David Byrne, describing the album as an "impressionist soundtrack" whose "spartan but melodic electronic strains ease gently through wide open spaces". He concluded that it is "both imaginative in itself and successful in inducing a blissed out mood of peace and relaxation (at least at night)." NME called Chill Out "a riot of running water, birdsong and electronic womb music"; reviewer Helen Mead said that the album, with its variety of sampled sounds, "not so much ... distracts you as envelops you". Record Mirror's Phil Cheeseman summarised Chill Out as "one long piece of flowing synthesised relaxation dotted with some very witty samples", recommending that it be listened to "as a prelude to a long night in, preferably not alone." Ian McCann of The Face proposed that if the listener is not under the influence of drugs, the album sounds "hopelessly pompous and almost classical." In Sounds, Russell Brown panned it as "too arbitrary and formless; it contains virtually no ozone-destroying beats at all."

In a 1994 retrospective review, Q's Andrew Collins described The KLF as "ahead of their time" and added that "the fact that Chill Out was seen largely as a urinary extraction exercise (Note: A "urinary extraction exercise" is (in convoluted British slang) a "piss take" – a targeted joke disguised as something serious.) at the time when such sound-painting now shapes young careers lends poignancy to its more balmy yet knowing moments." The Times called the album The KLF's "comedown classic", while John Bush of AllMusic awarded it five stars and cited it as "one of the essential ambient albums". In an "On Second Thought" review in Stylus Magazine, writer Scott Plagenhoef found Chill Out to be "less a morning after and more the slow awakening to a new day" and an album which "slowly unfolds its charms". Ira Robbins of Trouser Press was less favourable, likening it to "an accidental recording of 1970 Pink Floyd sessions during which all the participants have either left or fallen asleep" and calling it "the pleasantly attenuated soundtrack to a non-existent film that is easily forgotten."

In a 1996 feature, Mixmag named Chill Out the fifth best dance album of all time, citing Jimmy Cauty and Alex Paterson as having "kickstarted" ambient music with their DJ sets at the "seminal" house night "Land of Oz". Dom Philips of Mixmag described Chill Out as "a gorgeous patchwork of sound, noise and melody ... the samples are carefully woven into a beautiful spider's web of sound." In 2008, Pitchfork included "Wichita Lineman Was a Song I Once Heard" in The Pitchfork 500, their list of the 500 greatest songs between 1977 and 2006, and later ranked the track at number 80 in their "Top 200 Tracks of the 1990s" list in 2010. In 2022, Pitchfork ranked the album at number 76 in their list of "The 150 Best Albums of the 1990s".

== Themes ==
The use of a journey as a unifying musical or conceptual thread featured several times in Cauty and Drummond's work, including The White Room, "Last Train to Trancentral", "Justified and Ancient" and "America: What Time Is Love?". Cauty's Space and The Orb's debut album, The Orb's Adventures Beyond the Ultraworld also employ the journey concept. (Note: Paterson and Cauty were the original incarnation of The Orb; they split in April 1990, with Paterson retaining the name. The subsequent release of the ambient Space LP—originally intended to be The Orb's debut album —was credited only to Cauty.)

Sheep, which appear both on the recording of Chill Out—as guest vocalists according to Scott Piering's press release—and in its sleeve artwork, became a theme of The KLF's output, featuring in the ambient video Waiting, The White Room album artwork, and later—in a macabre gesture—after their controversial appearance at the 1992 Brit Awards ceremony. According to Drummond, Chill Out and its sleeve have "the vibe of the rave scene over here [in the UK]. When we're having the big Orbital raves out in the country, and you're dancing all night and then the sun would come up in the morning, and then you'd be surrounded by this English rural countryside ... we wanted something that kind of reflected that, that feeling the day after the rave, that's what we wanted the music for". The cover was also inspired by that of the Pink Floyd album Atom Heart Mother.

Drummond has documented his affinity for pedal steel and country music, stating that although he has "loved all sorts of music, ... country music is the only music [he's] been totally able to identify with", and declaring: "the weep of a pedal steel guitar is the sound of heartstrings being torn".

== Personnel ==
The sleeve notes that the album was "Composed Compiled and Collated by the KLF". Simon Reynolds (1999) and Mark Prendergast (2003) report the uncredited involvement of Alex Paterson, whereas a 1993 piece in i-D—in which Paterson was interviewed—claimed that Chill Out was a "spin-off" from the Cauty/Paterson sessions at Trancentral. However, in a 2011 interview with Magnetic Magazine, Paterson corroborated his involvement and contribution to the album and said he had in fact been "ripped off" by The KLF and notably Cauty, stating; "KLF put the Chill Out album out, which was basically a bunch of my DJ sessions at Trancentral which I never got credited for. That was one of the major reasons why Jimi and I split up. It was becoming apparent to me that everything he said he had given me, he never gave me. That shaped quite a lot of things in my head. Never to be ripped off again, I suppose. Don't worry, I got ripped off again. But as Jimi said to me, you're never really famous until you've been ripped off."

== Legacy ==
In August 1990, the single "What Time Is Love? (Remodelled & Remixed)" was released. It included the ambient house "Virtual Reality Mix", reprising many elements of Chill Out.

Elements of Chill Out also featured heavily in The KLF's "UFO Mix" of "It Must Be Obvious" by Pet Shop Boys, released in September 1990 and incorporating "What Time Is Love?", a "Pure Trance" track not used on the LP.

In July 2004, UK performance collective Popdamage "reconstructed" Chill Out as a live performance at The Big Chill music festival, recreating many of the album's vocal and musical samples live on-stage.

In February 2021, the KLF released Come Down Dawn, a reworking of Chill Out with a selection of prominent but unlicensed samples from the original release removed.

== Track listing ==
The track listing of Chill Out uses the start- and end-points of the parts, instead of the conventional track numbering system, indicating that the album be treated as a single composition. For the original KLF Communications CD release, the entire album was written to one track.

No.	Title	Length
1.	"Brownsville Turnaround on the Tex-Mex Border"	1:43
2.	"Pulling out of Ricardo and the Dusk Is Falling Fast"	1:29
3.	"Six Hours to Louisiana, Black Coffee Going Cold"	3:01
4.	"Dream Time in Lake Jackson"	2:37
5.	"Madrugada Eterna"	7:41
6.	"Justified and Ancient Seems a Long Time Ago"	1:09
7.	"Elvis on the Radio, Steel Guitar in My Soul"	2:40
8.	"3 A.M. Somewhere out of Beaumont"	9:50
9.	"Wichita Lineman Was a Song I Once Heard"	5:57
10.	"Trancentral Lost in My Mind"	0:56
11.	"The Lights of Baton Rouge Pass By"	3:26
12.	"A Melody from a Past Life Keeps Pulling Me Back"	1:27
13.	"Rock Radio into the Nineties and Beyond"	1:27
14.	"Alone Again with the Dawn Coming Up"	0:19
Total length:		44:43
