= Justified & Ancient =

1991 single by the KLF

Single by the KLF featuring Tammy Wynette

from the album The White Room
- Released: March 1991 (original track); 25 November 1991 (remade)
- Recorded: Trancentral
- Genre: House
- Length: 3:37 ("Stand by the JAMs")
- Label: KLF Communications
- Songwriters: Jimi Cauty; Bill Drummond; Ricardo Lyte
- Producers: Bill Drummond; Jimmy Cauty

Drummond and Cauty singles chronology
"It's Grim Up North" (1991)	"Justified & Ancient" (1991)	"3 a.m. Eternal" (The KLF vs ENT version) (1992)

Music video
- "Justified & Ancient" on YouTube

"Justified & Ancient" is a song by British band the KLF. It appeared featured on their 1991 studio album, The White Room, but its origins date back to the duo's debut album, 1987 (What the Fuck Is Going On?).

The song is best known for its remake that was released on 25 November 1991 as a pop-house single subtitled "Stand by the JAMs", with verses sung by American country music singer Tammy Wynette. This version was an international hit, reaching number two on the UK Singles Chart, number 11 on the US Billboard Hot 100, and number one in 18 countries. "Justified & Ancient" was the final release by the KLF through retail channels before Drummond and Cauty quit the music business and retired the KLF name.

== Background ==
The KLF — King Boy D (Bill Drummond) and Rockman Rock (Jimmy Cauty) — began working together in 1987 as the Justified Ancients of Mu Mu (the JAMs). The song title "Justified & Ancient" refers to this pseudonym. The JAMs took their name from a fictional subversive cult from the 1970s conspiratorial novels The Illuminatus! Trilogy. Just as the fictional JAMs made it their remit to propagate chaos and confusion, so too did the real JAMs and the KLF. Their attempts to subvert the music industry and other establishments were frequent, unconcealed and controversial. The song "Justified & Ancient" is a statement of identity and rebellious intent. Moreover, it deliberately understates this intent. In contrast to the provocative and abrasive lyrics of the JAMs' album 1987 (What the Fuck Is Going On?), on which "Justified & Ancient" first appeared, the song has a soft and innocuous tune, and quaint lyrics:

"We don't want to upset the apple-cart, and we don't want to cause any harm, but if you don't like what we're going to do, you'd better not stop us 'cause we're coming through."

== Origins ==
"Justified & Ancient (Stand by the JAMs)"
The result of the song's evolution: upbeat, funky, and featuring Tammy Wynette.

The words and music of "Justified & Ancient" appear several times in the work of the KLF and the JAMs, including their first album and their last full-release single.

The melody and one repeated lyrical verse of the song first appeared as part of "Hey Hey We Are Not the Monkees" from the JAMs' debut album, 1987: What the Fuck Is Going On?. All of the album's most prominent characteristics are notably absent in this part of "Hey Hey...", which has female vocals (as opposed to the rapping of the JAMs' Scottish co-founder Bill Drummond), inoffensive lyrics, and it is free from plagiarised samples of other artists' recordings. Also in contrast, "Hey Hey" itself begins with a minute's worth of typical human sexual intercourse noises, arranged as a rhythm. It progresses into a cryptic and bleak spoken verse from Drummond and descends into a cacophony of samples from "The Monkees Theme". An abrupt cut takes the track into the gentle "Justified & Ancient" vocal line, which is syncopated similarly to African music and is at first a cappella.

In 1990, the recording re-appeared on the KLF's ambient album, Chill Out, in a part of the composition titled "Justified & Ancient Seems a Long Time Ago". This time the song provides a complement rather than a contrast to the mood of the album, which is passive and contains various authentic ethnic sounds.

In March 1991, a full song called "Justified & Ancient" appeared on the KLF's album The White Room. Sung by Black Steel, the song begins and ends the album. This version retains the lyrics and melody, adds an additional verse, and full song structure and instrumentation is present, in an arrangement akin to a lullaby. Where the song starts the album, it is interrupted at the point "...they're coming through" by urgent "Mu Mu!" samples and blazing machine guns that open the house track "What Time Is Love?". At the end of the mellower second half of the album, the song is presented in its entirety.

== "Stand by the JAMs" featuring Tammy Wynette ==
Tammy Wynette and the Handmaidens of Mu in the video for the song

In November 1991, the single "Justified & Ancient (Stand by the JAMs)" was re-recorded, this time featuring the lead vocals of country music singer Tammy Wynette, introduced in the sleevenotes as "the first lady of country". Drummond flew to Nashville to personally produce the recording of Wynette's vocals.

"Justified & Ancient (Stand by the JAMs)" was an upbeat and funky version of the song, the subtitle referencing Tammy Wynette's signature song "Stand by Your Man", and the inclusion of subtle pedal steel guitar also referencing Wynette's country origins. The "Justified & Ancient" single marked a departure from the KLF's previous "Stadium House" trilogy of hits, which were driven by hooks and riffs and emulated a live performance by using sampled crowd noise. In contrast, the riffs, samples and rap of "Justified & Ancient (Stand by the JAMs)" were secondary to its conventional song structure of verses and choruses. Still, a riff borrowed from Jimi Hendrix' "Voodoo Child (Slight Return)" runs through the choruses.

A longer mix of this arrangement, "Justified & Ancient (All Bound for Mu Mu Land)", dispensed with the pedal steel and substituted Wynette's lead vocals with those of Maxine Harvey, a regular contributor to the KLF's material. It also contained an additional verse making references to various aspects of the KLF's mythology.

Some commentators were suspicious that the surprising pairing of Wynette with the KLF ("perhaps the oddest modern-day pop pairing" according to The Independent) was a marketing ploy. Other commentators pointed to the KLF member Drummond's fondness for country music as motivating the collaboration, or to the fact a period of almost exactly 23 years separated the first airings of "Stand by Your Man" and "... (Stand by the JAMs)".

"I really don't know why they chose me. I was apprehensive at first, but I'm really excited with the way it's all turned out", Wynette said. "Mu Mu Land looks a lot more interesting than Tennessee.... But I wouldn't want to live there."

"Justified & Ancient (Stand by the JAMs)" was the final single to be released commercially by the KLF through retail channels, following the US release of "America: What Time Is Love?" and followed only by a limited edition mail order release of a re-recording of "3 a.m. Eternal" featuring Extreme Noise Terror.

=== Reviews and reaction ===
The single reached number two on the UK Singles Chart, being held off the number one spot for New Year's Day 1992 (not Christmas 1991 as is often erroneously claimed) by the re-release of Queen's "Bohemian Rhapsody". "Justified & Ancient (Stand by the JAMs)" also reached number 11 on the US Billboard Hot 100, (returning Wynette to the top-40 on that chart for the first time since 1969), number three on the Australian Singles Chart, number one in Sweden, and number one on the Austrian Top 40. The UK music press received the release generally positively: it was "single of the week" in New Musical Express (NME) and Melody Maker. NME noted the "beautiful ethnic chorus lines! Ice Cream Vans! F--king awful lyrics!" [sic], and found that although the single "...lacks the sheer frantic rush of 'Last Train to Trancentral' ..., The KLF model a spiritual crown which elevates them several tower blocks above their amateur peers." Johnny Dee from Smash Hits commented, "Very weirdy and very ravey, as we've come to expect from the odd bods in the snoods, but this "anthem" is given an extra tang by the vocals of country star, Tammy Wynette". In the US, Larry Flick from Billboard magazine commented, "The decision to enlist country music queen Tammy Wynette for the lead vocal was a stroke of pure genius. Her distinctive style provides a weird-but-appealing contrast to the British dance duo's electro/hip-hop instrumental noodlings. Sort of sounds like the theme to a space-age spaghetti western. A sure-fire club smash, look for this gem to reignite top 40 interest pronto."

In 1995, a celebrity panel working for The Times compiled a list of 90 songs that represented the decade in music so far, with no more than one song per band allowed. "Justified & Ancient" was the KLF's entry (at number 44), with the lyrics described as "delightful nonsense". Splendid magazine echoed this, but even more eulogistically. "I still maintain that this song deserves a place among the greatest artworks of the 20th century. Not only is it a brilliant, gleefully daft, wholly nonsensical, perfectly ludicrous pop song with a chorus to kill for, not only is it a slyly subversive comment on the cynically repulsive old-artist-collaborates-with-young-artist phenomenon at the expense of itself, but, self-referential irony and all, it is and always will be globe-straddling pop music incarnate. Were a decision reached that all pop music was deemed unfit for human consumption and had to be destroyed, save for one song to keep us fickle masses in choruses, this would have to be the one, folks." In 2006, Slant Magazine ranked the song at number 79 on their list of the "100 Greatest Dance Songs".

Following their collaboration with Tammy Wynette, and the subsequent appearance of Glenn Hughes on "America: What Time Is Love?", the KLF were, according to mixer Mark "Spike" Stent, swamped by phone calls from fading music stars, including Neil Sedaka and Sweet, who were eager to work with the KLF to revive their careers. This side-effect of the KLF's collaborations was at odds with their aim to subvert the music industry, as noted by GQ magazine in 1995. GQ published a retrospective of the KLF's career and interview with Bill Drummond, and suggested that such collaborations were a contributory factor in the KLF's abandonment of music: "[Bill Drummond's] distaste for the machinery of pop was at war with the creative populism of KLF", and "KLF had become bona fide pop miracle workers... It was all spinning way out of Drummond's control".

=== Themes ===
Promotional material and antics for "Stand by the JAMs" used iconography of ice cream and an ice cream van, while the lyrics included the phrase "Make mine a '99' ". A working title for the "Justified & Ancient" project was "The Ice Cream Men". Several months prior to the single's release, the KLF appeared at the Liverpool Festival of Comedy, where they sold ice creams to the audience while, on stage, figures swathen in grey and yellow robes chanted "justified...ancient...". The ice cream van, introduced upon release of the JAMs single "It's Grim Up North", superseded the JAMsMobile (aka Ford Timelord) as the KLF's vehicle of choice. The van appeared with the KLF on stage when they 'performed' "Justified & Ancient" on Top of the Pops, with King Boy D (Drummond) and Rockman Rock (Cauty) dressed as ice cream cones and Tammy Wynette appearing behind them on a large screen.

The "ethnic chorus line" to which NME referred is the refrain "All bound for Mu Mu land", a reference to the Lost Continent of Mu, which is identified with the fictional land Lemuria in The Illuminatus! Trilogy novels. Indeed, at the end of the "Justified & Ancient" music video, the KLF exit in a submarine, while being waved off by the rest of the cast, before the video finishes with a snippet from the "Doctorin' the Tardis" music video featuring the superimposed credit-like text saying "The KLF would like to thank 'THE FIVE' for making all of this impossible".

== Personnel ==
=== The White Room version ===
- Bill Drummond – production, performance, programming
- Jimmy Cauty – production, performance, programming
- Black Steel – vocals, bass guitar
- Nick Coler – keyboards and programming
- Tony Thorpe – break

Source: JAMS LP006 sleeve notes

=== Single versions ===
The recordings were, according to the "Justified & Ancient" sleevenotes, "exhumed, explored and exploited by The KLF", with Jimmy Cauty playing electric guitar, bass, drums and keyboard. Additional contributors included:

- Tammy Wynette – lead vocals "Stand by the JAMs"
- Maxine Harvey – lead vocals "All Bound for Mu Mu Land", lead chorus "Stand by the JAMs"
- Ricardo da Force – rap
- Scott Piering – narration
- Rusty Pence – pedal steel "Stand by the JAMs"
- Tony Thorpe – 'groove consultant'
- Mark 'Spike' Stent – mixing "Stand by the JAMs", "All Bound for Mu Mu Land"

Source: KLF 99CD sleeve notes

== Formats and track listings ==
"Justified & Ancient" was given an international release as a single on 25 November 1991. In each case, all tracks are versions or mixes of this song, as tabulated below. The versions subtitled "(Make Mine a '99')" and "(Let Them Eat Ice Cream)" are deep house remixes of the single arrangement by Tony Thorpe, the former using Maxine Harvey's vocal and the latter mainly voxless.

Format (and countries)	Track number				
Format (and countries)	1	2	3	4	5
7-inch single, cassette single, CD single (Japan)	s	W			
12-inch single (UK, world)	A	m	s	L	
12-inch single (US)	A	m	S	L	
12-inch single (Scandinavia)	A	M	s	L	
CD single (US)	s	S	W	A	L
CD single (France)	A	m	s	L	W
CD single (Belgium)	s	W	A	m	L
CD single (elsewhere)	s	W	A	M	L

Key

- s - "Justified & Ancient (Stand by the JAMs)" – 3:37
- S - "Justified & Ancient (Stand by the JAMs)" (12-inch Version) – 5:31
- A - "Justified & Ancient (All Bound for Mu Mu Land)" – 7:45
- L - "Justified & Ancient (Let Them Eat Ice Cream)" – 6:31
- m - "Justified & Ancient (Make Mine a '99')" (Edit) – 3:17
- M - "Justified & Ancient (Make Mine a '99')" – 5:52
- W - "Justified & Ancient (The White Room Version)" – 5:04

== Charts ==
=== Weekly charts ===
Chart (1991–1992)	Peak position
Australia (ARIA)	3
Austria (Ö3 Austria Top 40)	1
Belgium (Ultratop 50 Flanders)	2
Canada Retail Singles (The Record)	1
Canada Top Singles (RPM)	8
Canada Dance/Urban (RPM)	1
Denmark (IFPI)	1
Europe (Eurochart Hot 100)	2
Europe (European Dance Radio)	16
Europe (European Hit Radio)	3
Finland (Suomen virallinen lista)	1
France (SNEP)	27
Germany (GfK)	3
Greece (IFPI)	2
Ireland (IRMA)	4
Luxembourg (Radio Luxembourg)	3
Netherlands (Dutch Top 40)	2
Netherlands (Single Top 100)	2
New Zealand (Recorded Music NZ)	1
Norway (VG-lista)	3
Portugal (AFP)	8
Spain (AFYVE)	5
Sweden (Sverigetopplistan)	1
Switzerland (Schweizer Hitparade)	2
UK Singles (Official Charts)	2
UK Airplay (Music Week)	1
UK Dance (Music Week)	11
UK Indie (Music Week)	1
UK Club Chart (Record Mirror)	12
US Billboard Hot 100	11
US Alternative Airplay (Billboard)	21
US Dance Club Songs (Billboard)	2
US Dance Singles Sales (Billboard)	3
US Cash Box Top 100	8

=== Year-end charts ===
Chart (1991)	Position
UK Singles (OCC)	27

Chart (1992)	Position
Australia (ARIA)	39
Austria (Ö3 Austria Top 40)	6
Belgium (Ultratop)	18
Canada Top Singles (RPM)	69
Canada Dance/Urban (RPM)	4
Europe (Eurochart Hot 100)	9
Germany (Media Control)	21
Netherlands (Dutch Top 40)	25
Netherlands (Single Top 100)	32
New Zealand (RIANZ)	15
Sweden (Topplistan)	7
Switzerland (Schweizer Hitparade)	11
UK Singles (OCC)	81
US Billboard Hot 100	86
US Maxi-Singles Sales (Billboard)	43

=== Decade-end charts ===
Chart (1990–1999)	Position
Austria (Ö3 Austria Top 40)	62
Canada (Nielsen SoundScan)	32

== Sales and certifications ==
Region	Certification	Certified units/sales
Australia (ARIA)	Gold	35,000^{^}
Germany (BVMI)	Gold	250,000^{^}
New Zealand (RMNZ)	Gold	5,000^{*}
United Kingdom (BPI)	Silver	200,000^{^}
^{*} Sales figures based on certification alone.^{^} Shipments figures based on certification alone.
