= I Wanna 1-2-1 With You =

Single by Solid Gold Chartbusters
- Released: 13 December 1999
- Genre: Novelty
- Label: Virgin
- Songwriter(s): Guy Pratt; Jimmy Cauty; Lloyd Stanton

"I Wanna 1-2-1 With You" is a mobile telephone-themed novelty-pop song by "Solid Gold Chartbusters", written by musicians Guy Pratt and Jimmy Cauty, and comedy writer Lloyd Stanton. The lead singer was Denise Palmer; the sleeve also credits Tessa Niles for vocals and Debbie Chazen as the voice of a switchboard operator. Due to the involvement of Cauty (KLF) and Pratt (Pink Floyd), Virgin Records touted Solid Gold Chartbusters as "The World's First Novelty Supergroup".

"I Wanna 1-2-1 With You" was released in an attempt to reach number one on the Christmas 1999 UK Singles Chart. Cauty had previously had a novelty number one in collaboration with Bill Drummond - Doctorin' the Tardis - and the duo had written a book - The Manual - on how to top the charts. In the month prior to the release of "I Wanna 1-2-1 With You", Cauty told NME that the song "[is] awful. Hear it once and that’s it, it’s all over. There is nothing vaguely hip, it’s just pure now, throwaway novelty pop."

The music video featured Cauty and Pratt dressed as mobile phones, along with appearances by John Thomson of the Fast Show, Stephen Marcus, and Rowland Rivron. Costumes from the video were later used in an advertising campaign in which online film clips purportedly showed pranksters stealing the cellphones of unsuspecting passersby.

Reviewing the single in the NME, Johnny Cigarettes wrote that the record by "‘the world’s first novelty supergroup’... looks set to be another first – a novelty record that is so unspeakably annoying that NO FUCKER IN THE COUNTRY BUYS IT". The single subsequently spent one week in the UK Top 75, peaking at number 62.

== Track listings ==
CD single – EU

1. "I Wanna 1-2-1 With You (radio edit)"
2. "I Wanna 1-2-1 With You (extended club mix)"

12" single – UK

1. "I Wanna 1-2-1 With You (extended club version)"
2. "I Wanna 1-2-1 With You (radio edit)"

CC single – EU

- Side one
1. "I Wanna 1-2-1 With You (radio edit)"
2. "I Wanna 1-2-1 With You (extended club version)"
3. "Philler #004"
- Side two
1. "I Wanna 1-2-1 With You (radio edit)"
2. "I Wanna 1-2-1 With You (extended club version)"
3. "Philler #004"
