= 3 a.m. Eternal =

1989 single by the KLF

- Cover art for the "Live at the S.S.L." version

Single by the KLF

from the album The White Room
- Released: May 1989 (Pure Trance 2); 7 January 1991 (live at the S.S.L.); January 1992 (The KLF vs ENT version)
- Genre: House
- Length: 5:55 (Pure Trance original); 5:50 (Live at the S.S.L.); 2:43 (The KLF vs ENT version)
- Label: KLF Communications
- Songwriters: Jimmy Cauty; Bill Drummond
- Producers: Bill Drummond; Jimmy Cauty

Drummond and Cauty singles chronology
"What Time Is Love? (Pure Trance)" (1988)	"3 a.m. Eternal" (1989)	"Kylie Said to Jason" (1989)
"What Time Is Love? (Live at Trancentral)" (1990)	"3 a.m. Eternal (Live at the S.S.L.)" (1991)	"Last Train to Trancentral (Live from the Lost Continent)" (1991)
"Justified and Ancient (Stand by The JAMs)" (1991)	"3 a.m. Eternal (The KLF vs ENT version)" (1992)	"K Cera Cera" (1993)

Music video
- "3 a.m. Eternal (Live at the S.S.L.)" on YouTube

"3 a.m. Eternal" is a song by British acid house group the KLF, taken from their fourth and final studio album, The White Room (1991). Numerous versions of the song were released as singles between 1989 and 1992 by their label KLF Communications. In January 1991, an acid house pop version of the song became an international top ten hit single, reaching number-one on the UK Singles Chart, number two on the UK Dance Singles Chart and number five on the US Billboard Hot 100, and leading to the KLF becoming the internationally biggest-selling singles band of 1991.

The following year, when the KLF accepted an invitation to perform at the 1992 BRIT Awards ceremony, they caused controversy with a succession of anti-establishment gestures that included a duet performance of "3 a.m. Eternal" with the crust punk band Extreme Noise Terror, during which KLF co-founder Bill Drummond fired machine-gun blanks over the audience of music industry luminaries. A studio-produced version of this song was issued as a limited edition mail order 7-inch single, the final release by the KLF and their independent record label, KLF Communications. Q Magazine ranked "3 a.m. Eternal" number 150 in their list of the "1001 Best Songs Ever" in 2003.

== Origins ==
The original 1989 12-inch single release constituted the second of the KLF's "Pure Trance" series. There were two issues, numbered 005T (pink writing on a black sleeve, with two KLF mixes) and 005R (black writing on a pink sleeve, with four more mixes, including remixes by the Cauty/Paterson incarnation of The Orb ("Blue Danube Orbital") and The Moody Boys). British singer Maxine Harvey performed primary vocals.

== Stadium House version ==
A version heavily reworked for a mainstream audience, "3 a.m. Eternal (Live at the S.S.L.)", was issued on 7 January 1991, reaching number one on the UK singles chart and number five on the US Billboard Hot 100. This version incorporated rap verses by Ricardo da Force and opening vocals from soul legend P. P. Arnold, both of whom appear in the music video. Crowd noise (apparently from a live U2 concert) was added to the mix to give the impression that the single was a live recording. The "S.S.L." in the subtitle refers to a Solid State Logic mixing desk. The 7-inch version of this mix appears on the album The White Room. The main B-side was a dub-based version of the same song, "3 a.m. Eternal (Guns of Mu Mu)", featuring the bassline from The Clash's "Guns of Brixton". Concurrent with the chart-topping version, yet another 12-inch was released, with resolutely underground remixes by The Moody Boys.

== Music video ==
There were two videos released for the Live at the S.S.L. version. The American video includes an opening with a travel through the mythical "Land of Mu Mu" where the KLF are performing inside a pyramid scenery with singers in a stadium. The European video, which was directed by British director, artist/designer, writer and producer Bill Butt, shows the KLF vehicle (the police cruiser used in their Timelords incarnation) driving around London with Ricardo da Force rapping in the backseat, intercut with footage of him and a full band performing the song onstage. The video received heavy rotation on MTV Europe in February 1991.

== The KLF vs Extreme Noise Terror ==
In January 1992, the KLF released a limited edition mail order only single containing a new version of "3 a.m." featuring the grindcore/crust punk band Extreme Noise Terror (called the "Christmas Top of the Pops 1991" version as the KLF had hoped to perform it on the 1991 Christmas Top of the Pops but were rebuffed by the BBC). The two bands instead performed a live version of the song at the BRIT Awards ceremony in February 1992. The Brits performance included a limping, kilted, cigar-chomping Drummond firing blanks from an automatic weapon over the heads of the crowd.

After viewing the rehearsals, NME writer Danny Kelly said: "Compared to what's preceded it, this is a turbo-powered metallic wolf breaking into a coop full of particularly sick doves... And the noise? Well, the noise is hardcore punk thrash through a disco Techno hit played by crusties. All bases covered, brilliantly. Clever, clever bastards." At the end of the performance, Scott Piering announced to a stunned crowd that "The KLF have now left the music business". Kelly later described the Brits performance as the KLF's "self-destruction in an orgy of punk rock..., mock outrage ... and real bad taste". The track finally saw wide release in 2021 when it was included as part of the Solid State Logik compilations released by the KLF in January that year.

== Critical reception ==
Larry Flick from Billboard magazine commented, "Alternative dance act makes its label debut with an invigorating rave that picks up where the previous 'What Time Is Love' left off. Sonic blast of techno/hip-hop, industrial riffs, and R&B diva vocals has the juice to kick hard on the dancefloor and ignite crossover radio action."

In a January 1991 feature on the KLF, NME writer Roger Morton described the "Pure Trance Original" as a "classic club track" and the "Live at the S.S.L." version as "murderously powerful". In 1992, the magazine's David Quantick wrote, "This one-sided, white label, 1,000 copies only, your-mates-won't-have-it-and-you-will seven inch monster is in the great tradition of KLF product, not as shiningly beautiful as "Last Train to Trancentral" or quite as bonkers as "Justified and Ancient", but any band who can discern the secret link between hardcore thrash and hardcore dance are well worth the candle." As Record Mirror's "Single of the Week", the "Live at the S.S.L." version was regarded as "a magnificent pulsating beast combining bleeps and body heat". In a 2000 retrospective review, The Guardian referred to the "Live at the S.S.L." version as an "epic pop masterpiece".

An editor from Complex commented that "the message [of the song] is universal: Time is eternal." Tom Ewing of Freaky Trigger described it, along with the Live at Trancentral version of What Time Is Love? and Last Train to Trancentral, as an "awe-inspiring, colossal, unprecedented dancefloor bulldozer". Dave Sholin from the Gavin Report wrote, "Production wizardry from these techno-talents earns three stars for a highly original effort. A #1 track in their native England, it's won over audiences throughout Europe and stands to do the same in North America. Strengthened by a video that is nothing short of exceptional, it's getting major exposure on MTV with five plays a day in "Buzz Bin" rotation."

The "Pure Trance Original" was described by Record Mirror as a "euro-flavoured deep house pulser" with atmospheric chanting and a "cathedral-like resonance".

In 2020, The Guardian ranked the song number 23 in their list of "The 100 greatest UK No 1s". In 2022, Rolling Stone ranked it number 147 in their "200 Greatest Dance Songs of All Time" list.

== Formats and track listings ==
"3 a.m. Eternal (Pure Trance Original)" was aired as a UK 12-inch single in May 1989. "3 a.m. Eternal (Live from the S.S.L.)" was given an international release as a single on 7 January 1991. A single of remixes by The Moody Boys was given a limited release a week later. In January 1992, a one-sided 7-inch single of the KLF's collaboration with Extreme Noise Terror was released via mail order only, with a limited pressing of 1,000 copies.

Format (and countries)	Track number			
Format (and countries)	1	2	3	4
Pure Trance Original
12-inch (KLF Communications KLF 005T)	P	B		
12-inch (KLF Communications KLF 005R)	p	O	M	E
Live at the S.S.L.
7-inch single, cassette single	l	g		
12-inch single (US)	L	G	K	W
12-inch single (elsewhere)	L	G		
CD single (Japan)	l	G	B	W
CD single (elsewhere)	l	G	B	
KLF Present the Moody Boys Selection
12-inch single, CD single	W	R	K	
The KLF vs ENT version
7-inch single (limited edition of 1000 copies)	T			

Key

P - "3 a.m. Eternal (Pure Trance Original)" (5:55)	g - "3 a.m. Eternal (Guns of Mu Mu)" (edit) (3:30)
B - "3 a.m. Eternal (Break for Love)" (5:39)	G - "3 a.m. Eternal (Guns of Mu Mu)" (5:20)
p - "3 a.m. Eternal (Pure Trance Original)" (edit) (3:38)	W - "3 a.m. Eternal (Wayward Dub Version)" (6:54)
O - "3 a.m. Eternal (Blue Danube Orbital)" (7:35)	R - "3 a.m. Eternal (Rankin' Club Version)" (4:34)
M - "3 a.m. Eternal (Moody Boy)" (6:50)	K - "3 a.m. Eternal (Klonk Blip Every Trip)" (5:48)
E - "3 p.m. Electro" (5:58)	T - "3 a.m. Eternal (The KLF vs Extreme Noise Terror: TOTP version)" (2:43)
l - "3 a.m. Eternal (Live at the S.S.L.)" (edit) (3:42)
L - "3 a.m. Eternal (Live at the S.S.L.)" (5:50)

== Charts ==
=== Weekly charts ===
Chart (1990–1991)	Peak position
Australia (ARIA)	3
Austria (Ö3 Austria Top 40)	4
Belgium (Ultratop 50 Flanders)	11
Canada Top Singles (RPM)	18
Canada Dance/Urban (RPM)	1
Denmark (IFPI)	1
Europe (Eurochart Hot 100)	2
Europe (European Hit Radio)	14
Finland (Suomen virallinen lista)	1
Germany (GfK)	3
Greece (IFPI)	5
Israel (Israeli Singles Chart)	2
Luxembourg (Radio Luxembourg)	2
Netherlands (Dutch Top 40)	6
Netherlands (Single Top 100)	5
New Zealand (Recorded Music NZ)	10
Norway (VG-lista)	5
Spain (AFYVE)	3
Sweden (Sverigetopplistan)	2
Switzerland (Schweizer Hitparade)	4
UK Singles (Official Charts)	1
UK Airplay (Music Week)	15
UK Dance (Music Week)	2
UK Indie (Music Week)	1
US Billboard Hot 100	5
US Dance Singles Sales (Billboard)	5
US Dance Club Songs (Billboard)	1
US Cash Box Top 100	15

=== Year-end charts ===
Chart (1991)	Position
Australia (ARIA)	25
Belgium (Ultratop 50 Flanders)	68
Canada Dance/Urban (RPM)	12
Europe (Eurochart Hot 100)	11
Europe (European Hit Radio)	95
Germany (Media Control)	20
Netherlands (Dutch Top 40)	33
Netherlands (Single Top 100)	28
New Zealand (RIANZ)	36
Sweden (Topplistan)	10
Switzerland (Schweizer Hitparade)	30
UK Singles (OCC)	12
US Billboard Hot 100	61
US 12-inch Singles Sales (Billboard)	37
US Dance Club Play (Billboard)	11

== Certifications ==
Region	Certification	Certified units/sales
Australia (ARIA)	Gold	35,000^{^}
United Kingdom (BPI)	Silver	200,000^{^}
^{^} Shipments figures based on certification alone.
