= Space (Jimmy Cauty album) =

Studio album by Jimmy Cauty as Space
- Released: 16 July 1990
- Recorded: Trancentral
- Genre: Ambient house; space music
- Length: 38:21
- Label: KLF Communications
- Producer: Jimmy Cauty

Space is a 1990 ambient house concept album by Jimmy Cauty under the alias Space. Originally intended to be The Orb's debut album, Space was refactored for release as a solo album following Cauty's departure from that group. Space was independently released on KLF Communications, the record label formed to distribute the work of Cauty's other project, The KLF.

== Origins ==
Space was originally a collaboration between Alex Paterson and Jimmy Cauty, the original line-up of The Orb. Cauty's record label KLF Communications planned to release it as The Orb's debut album, but when Cauty left The Orb in April 1990 to concentrate on producing music as The KLF with Bill Drummond, he took the recordings with him. Reworked to remove Paterson's contributions, the album was released by KLF Communications in July 1990 as an eponymous album, with Cauty alone receiving credit.

Youth, a friend and colleague of both men, recalled: "Jimmy and Alex were making an album called Space when they had a big argument. Jimmy stormed off, took all of Alex’s bits off the record and released it under his own name. Alex was mortified. I told him not to worry – we’d make a record that was even better".

According to Cauty, Space "was a jam, all done on Oberheim keyboards. Loads of samples... were chucked in there as well. I started on Monday morning and by Friday it was all done". He said: "Nothing was prepared, I started on a Monday morning and just jammed the whole thing."

== Composition ==
Space takes the listener on a voyage through the Solar System from Mercury outwards, with vast distances of empty space between worlds represented by periods of minimalist ambience and near-silence. Synthesisers, excerpts from classical compositions and nursery rhymes (including Twinkle Twinkle Little Star), sinusoidal loops, and communications from space flight controllers are among the sounds used to describe the voyage. This musical interpretation of a physical journey is also a characteristic of the early ambient house recordings The Orb's Adventures Beyond the Ultraworld and The KLF's Chill Out.

Cauty has called Space "a record for 14-year-old space cadets to go and take acid [to] for the first time".

== Reviews ==
Professional ratings
Review scores
Source	Rating
AllMusic	4/5 stars

John Bush at AllMusic attributes "incredibly sparse ambience" to Space, with "long periods of near-silence [and] only an occasional break for galactic sine-waves and similarly spacy tones". The album is "more important for who's on it than what's in it", he concluded.

== Track listing ==
Space comprises eight contiguous pieces across two sides of vinyl or one track of a CD.

1. "Mercury" – 1:39
2. "Venus" – 2:00
3. "Mars" – 8:47
4. "Jupiter" – 6:34
5. "Saturn" – 2:44
6. "Uranus" – 2:57
7. "Neptune" – 10.28
8. "Pluto" – 3:10
