= The White Room (KLF album) =

Studio album by the KLF
- Released: 1989 (Original Motion Picture Soundtrack); 4 March 1991 (album); 23 April 2021 (1989 Director's Cut)
- Recorded: 1989–1990
- Studios: Trancentral; The Village, Dagenham; Lillie Yard, London; Matrix, London; Mixing: Lillie Yard, London; Townhouse, London; The Manor, Shipton-on-Cherwell
- Genres: Electronica; acid house; rave
- Length: 43:43
- Label: KLF Communications
- Producer: The KLF

The KLF chronology
| Chill Out (1990) | The White Room (1989) | The Black Room (Unreleased) |

Singles from The White Room
- 1. "What Time Is Love?" Released: 30 July 1990; 2. "3 a.m. Eternal" Released: 7 January 1991; 3. "Last Train to Trancentral" Released: 22 April 1991; 4. "Justified and Ancient" Released: 25 November 1991

The White Room is the fourth and final studio album by British electronic music group the KLF, released on 4 March 1991. The album features versions of the band's hit singles, including "What Time Is Love?", "3 a.m. Eternal", "Justified and Ancient" and "Last Train to Trancentral". Originally scheduled for 1989 as the soundtrack to a film of the same name, the album's direction was changed after both the film and the original soundtrack LP were cancelled.

Most tracks on the original album version are present in the final 1991 release, though in significantly remixed form. The White Room was supposed to be followed by a darker, harder complementary album The Black Room, but that plan was abandoned when the KLF retired in 1992. On 23 April 2021, a re-edited version of the album was officially released on streaming platforms, in a series of digital reissues, as The White Room (Director's Cut), featuring new edits of original tracks from 1989 to 1990 sessions.

== Background ==
The White Room was conceived as the soundtrack to a road movie, also called The White Room, about the KLF's search for the mystical White Room that would enable them to be released from their contract with Eternity. Parts of the movie were filmed in the Sierra Nevada region of Spain, using the money that Bill Drummond and Jimmy Cauty, under the alias The Timelords, had made with their 1988 number-one hit "Doctorin' the Tardis". The soundtrack album contained pop-house versions of some of the KLF's earlier "Pure Trance" singles, as well as new songs.

The film project was fraught with difficulties and setbacks, including dwindling funds. Drummond and Cauty had released "Kylie Said to Jason", a single from the original soundtrack, in the hopes that it could "rescue them from the jaws of bankruptcy"; it flopped commercially, however, failing to make even the UK top 100. As a consequence, The White Room film project was put on hold, and the KLF abandoned the musical direction of the soundtrack and single. Neither the film nor the soundtrack album were formally released, although bootleg copies of both exist.

== Promotion ==
Meanwhile, the KLF's single "What Time Is Love?", which had originally been released in 1988 and largely ignored by the public, was generating acclaim within the underground clubs of continental Europe; according to KLF Communications, "The KLF were being feted by all the 'right' DJs". This prompted Drummond and Cauty to pursue the acid house tone of their "Pure Trance" series. A further "Pure Trance" release, "Last Train to Trancentral", followed.

In October 1990, the KLF launched a series of singles with an upbeat pop-house sound they dubbed "Stadium House". Songs from The White Room soundtrack were re-recorded with rap and more vocals (by guests labelled "Additional Communicators"), a sample-heavy pop-rock production, and crowd noise samples. The "Stadium House" versions of "What Time Is Love?" and "3 a.m. Eternal" were immediate hits, with "3 a.m. Eternal" becoming the KLF's second, and the only one under the name, number-one release. These "Stadium House" tracks made up a large part of The White Room when it was eventually released in March 1991, substantially reworked from the original version. Aside from the singles, "Make It Rain", "Build a Fire", "Church of the KLF" and "The White Room" appeared in significantly more minimal, ambient and dub-oriented versions on the final album. "Go to Sleep" was reworked to become "Last Train to Trancentral".

From the original record that was planned for release in 1989 as Tunes from the White Room, in 1997, a bootleg CD taken from a low-quality cassette rip was released and included some bonus tracks. A higher-quality version, allegedly created by someone who mastered the original album DAT in a professional studio, was hosted on a popular KLF fan site, KLF.de in the early 2000s.

== Director's Cut ==
On 23 April 2021, The White Room (Director's Cut) was officially released as the fourth part of the series of remastered digital compilations under the collective title Samplecity thru Trancentral. The album's edition includes tracks from the unreleased 1989 album, plus versions of "Madrugada Eterna" and "Last Train to Trancentral".

== Critical reception ==
Professional ratings
Review scores
| Source | Rating |
|---|---|
| AllMusic | 5/5 stars |
| Entertainment Weekly | A− |
| Los Angeles Times | 3/5 stars |
| NME | 6/10 |
| Q | 4/5 stars |
| The Rolling Stone Album Guide | 4/5 stars |
| Select | 4/5 |
| Slant Magazine | 4.5/5 stars |
| Sounds | 4.5/5 stars |
| The Village Voice | A− |

Writing for Select, Andrew Harrison praised The White Room as "an enthralling album" which "plays a disconcerting game with the listener's expectations of the commercial end of house." In Q, Iestyn George called the album "strikingly imaginative" and "a more subtle form of subterfuge" than previous works. Anthony Farthing of Sounds viewed it as "a neat summation of Drummond and Cauty's colourful history – it embraces their previous JAMs-related guises while still updating the Kopyright Liberation Front's corporate identity." Entertainment Weekly's Marisa Fox wrote that the album's "diverse music is too rich to be labeled", while The Village Voice's Robert Christgau commented that the KLF "like everything I like about house and are canny enough to can the boring parts." NME journalist James Brown, however, found the album "insignificant and unadventurous", criticising its songs' lack of "direction" and "hard substance".

In a retrospective review of the album, John Bush of AllMusic said that The White Room "represents the commercial and artistic peak of late-'80s acid-house." Franklin Soults stated in the 2004 Rolling Stone Album Guide that on The White Room, "the KLF became what they'd mocked with this enduring embrace of Euro-trash club culture. They knew their exit cue." Splendid magazine thought some of the tracks to be filler and the album "silly" in places, but were extremely impressed by the "Stadium House" songs. "As providers of perverse, throwaway, three-minute pop-song manna," they concluded, "the KLF were punk rock, the Renaissance, Andy Warhol and Jesus Christ all rolled into one."

In 1993, NME staff and contributors voted the album the 81st best of all time, and in 2000, Q listed it as the 89th best British album of all time. Scotland on Sunday listed The White Room in their "Essential 100", and readers of Scotland's Is this music? magazine voted the album the 44th best "Scottish" LP of all time. The White Room is included in the book 1001 Albums You Must Hear Before You Die.

== Track listing ==
=== Tunes from The White Room ===
| No. | Title | Length |
|---|---|---|
| 1. | "Kylie Said to Jason" (Edit) | 4:05 |
| 2. | "3 a.m. Eternal" (Pure Trance Original) (Edit) | 4:24 |
| 3. | "Go to Sleep" | 3:44 |
| 4. | "Make It Rain" | 3:43 |
| 5. | "Church of the KLF" | 3:58 |
| 6. | "No More Tears" | 3:26 |
| 7. | "Build a Fire" | 5:02 |
| 8. | "The Lovers' Side" | 4:24 |
| 9. | "The White Room" | 4:31 |
| 10. | "Born Free" | 3:02 |

=== 1991 album release ===
| No. | Title | Notes | Length |
|---|---|---|---|
| 1. | "What Time Is Love?" (LP Mix) | | 4:37 |
| 2. | "Make It Rain" | | 4:06 |
| 3. | "3 a.m. Eternal" (Live at the S.S.L.) | | 3:36 |
| 4. | "Church of the KLF" | | 1:53 |
| 5. | "Last Train to Trancentral" (LP Mix) | Segues from previous track | 5:33 |
| 6. | "Build a Fire" | | 4:39 |
| 7. | "The White Room" | | 5:14 |
| 8. | "No More Tears" | | 9:24 |
| 9. | "Justified and Ancient" | | 4:43 |

=== 1991 North American release ===
| No. | Title | Notes | Length |
|---|---|---|---|
| 1. | "Justified and Ancient" (Excerpt) | Unlisted | 1:31 |
| 2. | "What Time Is Love? (Live at Trancentral)" (7" Radio Edit) | Early fade | 3:46 |
| 3. | "Make It Rain" | Samples from Stevie Wonder song "Fingertips Part 2" removed; early fade | 3:37 |
| 4. | "3 a.m. Eternal (Live at the S.S.L.)" (Radio Edit) | Different to UK album version | 3:35 |
| 5. | "Church of the KLF" | | 1:53 |
| 6. | "Last Train to Trancentral (Live from the Lost Continent)" (Radio Edit) | Spoken intro removed; segues from the previous track | 3:41 |
| 7. | "Build a Fire" | | 4:34 |
| 8. | "The White Room" | | 5:14 |
| 9. | "No More Tears" (Edit) | Early fade | 6:42 |
| 10. | "Justified and Ancient" | Single version | 5:04 |

=== 2021 Director's Cut ===
| No. | Title | Notes | Length |
|---|---|---|---|
| 1. | "Go to Sleep" | Recorded in 1989 | 3:15 |
| 2. | "Make It Rain" | Recorded in 1990 | 3:48 |
| 3. | "Madrugada Eterna" (Club Mix) | Recorded in 1989 | 3:01 |
| 4. | "Church of the KLF" | Recorded in 1990 | 1:42 |
| 5. | "Last Train to Trancentral" (Da Force, Over & Out) | Recorded in 1990 | 5:49 |
| 6. | "Build a Fire" | Recorded in 1990 | 4:41 |
| 7. | "The White Room" | Recorded in 1990 | 3:46 |
| 8. | "No More Tears" | Recorded in 1990 | 9:21 |
| 9. | "The Lovers' Side" | Recorded in 1989 | 3:54 |
| 10. | "Justified & Ancient" (Black Steel Joins the JAMs) | Recorded in 1990 | 4:43 |
| Total length: | | | 44:04 |

== Personnel ==
- Jimmy Cauty – production, performance and programming
- Bill Drummond – production, performance, vocals and programming

=== Additional performers ===
- Nick Coler – keyboards, additional programming, backing vocals ("3 a.m. Eternal")
- Maxine Harvey – vocals, backing vocals (except "What Time Is Love?", "Justified and Ancient")
- Black Steel – vocals, scat singing, bass guitar ("No More Tears", "Justified and Ancient"), piano ("No More Tears")
- Ricardo Lyte – rap ("3 a.m. Eternal" and "Last Train to Trancentral")
- Isaac Bello – rap ("What Time Is Love?")
- Tony Thorpe – breaks, samples
- Duy Khiem – tenor saxophone ("Make It Rain"), clarinet ("The White Room")
- Graham Lee – pedal steel ("Build a Fire")
- P. P. Arnold – vocals
- Katie Kissoon – vocals
- Wanda Dee – sampled vocals

=== Engineering ===
- Spike Stent – mix
- Julian Gordon-Hastings – mix
- Arun Chakraverty – mastering

== Charts ==
=== Weekly charts ===
| Chart (1991) | Peak position |
|---|---|
| Australian Albums (ARIA) | 5 |
| Austrian Albums (Ö3 Austria) | 13 |
| Canada Top Albums/CDs (RPM) | 20 |
| Dutch Albums (Album Top 100) | 11 |
| German Albums (Offizielle Top 100) | 14 |
| New Zealand Albums (RMNZ) | 13 |
| Swedish Albums (Sverigetopplistan) | 12 |
| Swiss Albums (Schweizer Hitparade) | 13 |
| UK Albums (Official Charts) | 3 |
| US Billboard 200 | 39 |

=== Year-end charts ===
| Chart (1991) | Position |
|---|---|
| Austrian Albums (Ö3 Austria) | 30 |
| Dutch Albums (Album Top 100) | 26 |
| German Albums (Offizielle Top 100) | 43 |

== Certifications ==
| Region | Certification | Certified units/sales |
|---|---|---|
| Australia (ARIA) | Gold | 35,000^{^} |
| Canada (Music Canada) | Platinum | 100,000^{^} |
| Netherlands (NVPI) | Gold | 50,000^{^} |
| United Kingdom (BPI) | Platinum | 300,000^{^} |
| United States (RIAA) | Gold | 500,000^{^} |
^{^} Shipments figures based on certification alone.
