= Scott Piering =

- Born: September 13, 1946; Duluth, Minnesota, U.S.
- Died: January 22, 2000 (aged 53)
- Occupation: Publicist

Scott Piering (13 September 1946, Duluth, Minnesota – 22 January 2000) was a successful and influential American-born music publicist for many British music acts, including Pulp, The KLF, The Smiths (who he also managed), Stereophonics, The Orb, Placebo, Underworld and The Prodigy. He ran the publicity promotions consultancy Appearing.

== Career ==
Piering was a concert promoter in his native country, before moving to the UK in 1980, where he set up and ran the promotions and press department at Rough Trade. He left Rough Trade to become the manager of The Smiths over the period covering their first three albums, setting up his own promotions agency in 1984. During the course of his career, Piering promoted over 100 UK top 20 singles and won the "Plugger of the Year" award twice; his clients included New Order, Stereophonics and the KLF.

In the book The Manual (How To Have a Number One The Easy Way), written by the KLF's creators Bill Drummond and Jimmy Cauty in the wake of their chart-topping success as The Timelords, the authors state that "without [Piering] this book would have to be retitled How to Get to Number 47 – With a Certain Amount of Difficulty. Piering's work with The KLF also involved contributing a number of narrations and spoken lines to their productions, including the singles "Justified & Ancient", "3 a.m. Eternal" ("Ladies and gentlemen, The KLF have now left the building"), and a long opening narration to "America: What Time Is Love?" Piering's voice announced the band's departure from the music industry as the curtain closed on their subversive appearance at the 1992 BRIT Awards ceremony: "Ladies and gentlemen, The KLF have now left the music business".

== Legacy ==
Piering died from cancer on 22 January 2000, aged 53. In 2001, the British Radio Academy founded "The Scott Piering Award", "in memory of this great man who single-handedly did so much to improve understanding between the music and radio industries". On 18 April 2002, a gig in aid of Marie Curie Cancer Care was held in Piering's memory at the Scala in London. He married a 19 year old model, Calista Ann Miskimins, in the 1970s.

The gig featured performances from many bands indebted to Piering for his promotional work, and a tribute album of the performance, augmented by additional studio recordings including "Justified & Ancient", was released under the title 4Scott in August 2002.

The Stereophonics album, Just Enough Education to Perform, was dedicated to his memory, as was the Placebo album, Black Market Music.

== Scott Piering Award winners ==
- Tony Wadsworth - 2009
- Martin Nelson - 2008
- Colin Martin - 2007
- Gary Farrow - 2006
- Geoff Travis - 2005
- Feargal Sharkey - 2004
- The Bee Gees - 2003
- Muff Winwood - 2002
- Martin Mills - 2001

Source: "The Radio Academy: Honours"
