= What Time Is Love? =

1988 single by the KLF

- Pure Trance Original (004T) cover

Single by the KLF
- Released: July 1988
- Genre: Trance
- Length: 7:05 (Pure Trance); 5:20 (Live at Trancentral); 3:55 (radio edit); 9:02 ("America: What Time Is Love?")
- Label: KLF Communications
- Songwriters: Bill Drummond; Isaac Bello; Jimmy Cauty
- Producers: Drummond; Cauty

Drummond and Cauty singles chronology
"Doctorin' the Tardis" (1988)	"What Time Is Love? (Pure Trance)" (1988)	"3 a.m. Eternal (Pure Trance)" (1989)
"Last Train to Trancentral (Pure Trance)" (1990)	"What Time Is Love? (Live at Trancentral)" (1990)	"3 a.m. Eternal (Live at the S.S.L.)" (1991)
"Last Train to Trancentral (Live from the Lost Continent)" (1991)	"America: What Time Is Love?" (1991)	"It's Grim Up North" (1991)

Alternative covers
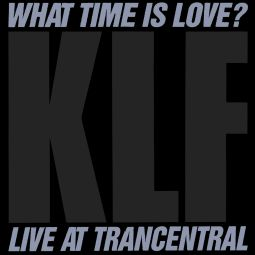
- Live at Trancentral cover

Music video
- "What Time Is Love? (Live at Trancentral)" on YouTube

"What Time Is Love?" is a song released, in different mixes, as a series of singles by the British electronic music band the KLF. It featured prominently and repeatedly in their output from 1988 to 1992 and, under the moniker of 2K, in 1997. In its original form, the track was an instrumental electronic dance anthem; subsequent reworkings, with vocals and additional instrumentation, yielded the international hit singles "What Time Is Love? (Live at Trancentral)" (1990), and "America: What Time Is Love?" (1991), which respectively reached number five and number four on the UK Singles Chart, and introduced the KLF to a mainstream international audience.

== History ==
The KLF co-founders Jimmy Cauty and Bill Drummond began releasing music in March 1987, under the pseudonym the Justified Ancients of Mu Mu (the JAMs), named after a cultish organisation from The Illuminatus! Trilogy novels. The JAMs' output was created from plagiarised samples of popular music grafted together to form new songs, with beatbox rhythms and Drummond's often political raps. Their second album, Who Killed the JAMs?, was followed by a newsletter which expressed regret that people believed the JAMs were leading "a crusade for sampling", and suggested "We might put out a couple of 12-inch records under the name the K.L.F., these will be rap free just pure dance music, so don't expect to see them reviewed in the music papers." The first incarnation of "What Time Is Love?" followed.

"What Time Is Love?" became one of the KLF's central tracks, dubbed their "three-note warhorse of a signature tune" by Bill Drummond, in reference to the three-note bassline which, together with a high-pitched refrain on two notes (B bending to F#) characterises the song. The bassline is very similar to the one used by Anne Clark the electronic musician in her 1984 song Our Darkness and to the guitar introduction to the song Heaven on Their Minds from the musical Jesus Christ Superstar.

In common with the singles "3 a.m. Eternal", "Last Train to Trancentral" and "Justified and Ancient", "What Time Is Love?" evolved through substantial reworkings, each new version taking elements of its predecessors and placing them in the context of a different musical genre. There were three main versions, released in 1988, 1990 and 1991, shifting the KLF's sound from acid house through pop into heavy rock-oriented electronica, and a remake under a different moniker in 1997.

"What Time Is Love? (Pure Trance Original)"
The origin 1988 acid house track.

"What Time Is Love? (LP version)"
The "Stadium House" treatment of the song.

"America: What Time Is Love?"
The hard rock/dance reworking.

=== Pure Trance Original ===
The original 1988 12" single release launched the KLF's minimalist "Pure Trance" series of singles.

The "Pure Trance" version is a synthesiser composition based around an acid house riff on three low-pitched notes and one minor chord (B minor). The subtle progression of the piece occurs through the modulation of the main loops, the dub-like dropping of particular loops, and a recurring high-pitched refrain on two notes (B bending to F#). An Oberheim OB-8 synthesiser provided the instrumentation.

Two discs of different "Pure Trance" mixes, numbered KLF 004T (green writing on a black sleeve) and KLF 004R (yellow writing on a black sleeve, and a cover sticker), were given low-key releases on 24 November 1988 and 24 July 1989 respectively. The cumulative popularity of KLF 004T in continental European clubs prompted the KLF to release a compilation album of selected cover versions and sound-alikes, entitled The "What Time Is Love?" Story.

As Drummond had predicted, the "Pure Trance" release received little attention from the music press. However, upon the release of The "What Time Is Love?" Story, Q Magazine hailed the track as "a whirling house stomper ... not so much of a tune but a good beat".

=== Live at Trancentral ===
A 1990 version subtitled "Live at Trancentral" was the first of the KLF's upbeat "Stadium House Trilogy" and the single that introduced the KLF to an international mainstream audience, reaching No. 5 in the UK Singles Chart. It is a pop-house reworking of the Pure Trance Original, adding vocal samples, a new bassline, a new house rhythm and a self-proclaiming rap (performed by Isaac Bello). The "Trancentral" in the subtitle refers to the KLF's recording studio. An LP version of this mix appears on the album The White Room.

A remix 12", "What Time Is Love? (Remodelled & Remixed)" was released a month after the "Stadium House" version. It contains remixes by Echo & the Bunnymen—for whom the KLF co-founder Bill Drummond had previously been manager—and the Moody Boys. Both "Live at Trancentral" and "Remodelled & Remixed" were declared 'Single of the Week' at different times by New Musical Express (NME), where "Live at Trancentral" was described as a collision of "energy, humour and violence". The magazine also ranked "Live at Trancentral" as the 47th best single of 1990. Q Magazine noted the "awesome vitality" of the LP version. A retrospective review of the LP version by Splendid Magazine found the song to be "extraordinary". "It throbs and pulses in a still-riveting manner that transcends the dated beatdrops. Fusing the siren-wailing urgency of rave anthemry with the drunk-on-its-own-riff brilliance of the stupidest, simplest pop music, it's the kind of song that sends electrifying impulses through the drunken brain."

=== America: What Time Is Love? ===
"America: What Time Is Love?"

Single by the KLF
- Released: February 1992
- Label: KLF Communications (UK)
- Songwriters: Bill Drummond; Isaac Bello; Jimmy Cauty
- Producers: Drummond; Cauty

Music video
- "America: What Time Is Love?" on YouTube

The single release "America: What Time Is Love?" constituted a major reworking of the anthem and was the KLF's final UK retail musical offering. It was released in February 1992 in the UK, four months after it was first made available in the US.

"America" has a markedly different tone to previous incarnations of the song: harder, heavier and more guitar-laden (featuring the riff from Motörhead's song “Ace of Spades"). It opens with a protracted narration by the KLF's regular narrator Scott Piering, about the JAMs' odyssey of 992 to discover America. Like "It's Grim Up North", it features a climactic orchestral section and a spoken list of towns and cities. However, in common with the "Stadium House" tracks, the mood of the song is one of jubilation. Between verses, a male chorus chants the word "America" to the tune of the song "Aquarius" from the rock musical Hair. Isaac Bello again provided rap, and Glenn Hughes (formerly of Deep Purple) provided vocals – a turning point for Hughes which he said helped "saved his life" from drug abuse.

In contrast, the B-side "America No More" is a sombre anti-war statement focusing on US foreign policy. With ambient overtones, it features forlorn guitars, austere brass and a pipe band loudly playing an improvisation in the style of Scottish traditional folk music, set against the backdrop of artillery noise and the recorded words of US politicians, commentators and evangelists speaking either about or during major 20th century US military conflicts. According to Drummond, it was the final track to be recorded by the KLF. Evangelists feature elsewhere in the KLF's music (including Chill Out, "What Time Is Love? (Remodelled & Remixed)," and "Fuck the Millennium"), as does gunfire (in the three "Stadium House" singles).

Reviewing "America: What Time Is Love?", Melody Maker found that "the whole bizarre concoction's brilliantly bonkers", but questioned the KLF's strategy of recycling their songs. "America No More" was described by The Wire in 1997 as "a devastating protest-montage of helicopters, bagpipes and carpet-bombs". NME declined to make "America: What Time Is Love?" 'Single of the Week', declaring it instead to be 'Single of the Millennium'.

=== Fuck the Millennium ===
In 1997, "What Time Is Love?" was covered by the Williams Fairey Band, a brass band which under the stewardship of British artist Jeremy Deller pioneered the Acid Brass concept. Inspired by an Acid Brass concert, Drummond and Cauty collaborated with Deller and Acid Brass on a new version of "What Time Is Love?" called "Fuck the Millennium" under the moniker 2K.

== Critical reception ==
Upon the 1989 release, Bill Coleman from Billboard magazine commented, "As odd as it may sound, "Jesus Christ Superstar" is the hook that propels this spacy techno instrumental with an industrial edge." In 1991, another editor, Larry Flick, described the song as a "refreshing rave that combines elements of hip-hop, techno, and pop." Dave Sholin from the Gavin Report wrote, "Carving a distinctive sound in any musical genre is difficult, but especially so in rap. The KLF is an outfit whose signature is totally unique and compelling. Top five across Europe and top three in England, here's a powerful followup to "3 A.M. Eternal"." Dave Jennings from Melody Maker remarked that here, they "returns with beats, sirens and whoops intact, but with cod-Russian chants and spoof American patriotic choirs shaking its foundation. The whole bizarre concoction's brilliantly bonkers as usual." A reviewer from Music & Media commented, "As soon as you've decided - it's soul, they change into a hiphouse act. Sometimes they even manage to combine both on one particular track, as on "What Time Is Love?". They use samples like schoolkids clear out glue-pots: right to the bottom." Sylvia Patterson from Smash Hits named it Best New Single, describing it as "an unflippin'believable power-pop anthem with mentaaahl guitars and Wall of Sound shrieks so far over the top they're binging round the sun and never coming back."

== Legacy ==
During the Pure Trance version's underground success, various cover versions and tributes appeared (some which were collected on The "What Time Is Love?" Story). The most-well known is Dr. Felix's "Relax Your Body".

Ragga Twins' 1991 track Wipe the Needle opens with the iconic synthesizer riff from What Time Is Love?.

In 1993 "What Time Is Love?" was covered by U.K. based American Noise/Art Rock band the God Machine. The track appeared as a B-side on their limited silver vinyl "Home" single and a promo CD.

:zoviet*France: side-project Horizon 222 on their 1993 piece Liberation (Om-Pa-Na-Da) (released on the 1994 album The Three of Swans) carefully work around the melodic and harmonic structure of What Time Is Love?, ultimately revealing its source in a short appearance of a reverberated sample from the original.

In 1997 a trance cover-version was released by German producer Talla 2XLC and in 1998 Choci and Mark Sinclair released their own hard trance reworking entitled What is Love?.

Reviewing Drummond's book 45 for The Observer in 2000, Steven Poole labelled "What Time Is Love?" an "epic pop masterpiece". The Observer also described the "Pure Trance Original" as a "juddering rave anthem".

On 14 July 2002, the "Pure Trance Original" was incorporated into DJ John Digweed's set at Fatboy Slim's free Brighton beach show, where it was played to a live audience of approximately 150,000 people and relayed to viewers of television channel E4. Digweed's set showcased the origins of trance music, with "What Time Is Love?" used alongside Underworld's "Dark & Long" and Paul Oakenfold's "Perfecto Mix" of U2's "Even Better Than the Real Thing".

British band Kaiser Chiefs covered "What Time Is Love?" on 14 February 2006 on BBC Radio 1. At the end of the performance, presenter Jo Whiley said "The Kaiser Chiefs have now left the building" in reference to the phrase used more than once by the KLF (and previously in reference to Elvis Presley).

German eurodance group Scooter sampled the music of the Trancentral version and the introductory lyrics of "America: What Time Is Love?" on their single "Behind the Cow", taken from the 2007 album The Ultimate Aural Orgasm. They had previously sampled the Trancentral version in 2001 on the song "Posse (I Need You on the Floor)" from the album We Bring the Noise!. In 2012 the group covered the song on their sixteenth album Music for a Big Night Out.

In 2006, English electronic musician Max Tundra released a single as that included a recording from 1989 doing a cover of "What Time Is Love?"

== Personnel ==
The three reworkings of the track were written and produced by Bill Drummond and Jimmy Cauty. Cauty also receives credit for playing electric guitar, bass, drums and keyboards on "America...", and Drummond for playing Gibson 330 on that version. Additional contributors to "What Time Is Love? (Live at Trancentral)" and "America: What Time Is Love?" included:

- Cressida Cauty – backing vocals ("America: What Time Is Love?")
- Echo & the Bunnymen – remixing for "What Time Is Love? (Remodelled & Remixed)"
- Glenn Hughes – The Voice of Rock ("America: What Time Is Love?")
- Isaac Bello – rap (for which co-writing credit is given)
- Mark "Spike" Stent – mix engineer
- Nick Coler – keyboards, programming and orchestral arrangement ("America: What Time Is Love?")
- Scott Piering – narration ("America: What Time Is Love?")
- Tony Thorpe – breaks, remixing for "What Time Is Love? (Remodelled & Remixed)"
- Wanda Dee – vocal sample "I wanna see you sweat" (for which co-writing credit is given)

== Formats and track listings ==
As a central track in the KLF's canon, "What Time Is Love?" was given international commercial releases on many occasions and in many forms between 1988 and 1992. The following lists detail most of these, but are not exhaustive.

=== Pure Trance 1 ===
"What Time Is Love? (Pure Trance Original)" (catalogue number KLF 004T) was first released on 17 October 1988, and deleted following initially low UK media interest and sales. The reaction from continental Europe's clubbers and DJs led to further European releases in 1989 and 1990. In late 1989, a US edition of "Pure Trance 1" (sea-green writing on a black sleeve, and slightly different typography) was issued on the TVT label, including a live version taken from The "What Time is Love?" Story. The KLF's "Pure Trance" series was originally envisaged as comprising five "Original" 12" singles and five "Remix" 12"s. The "Pure Trance Remix" single of "What Time Is Love?" was released on 24 July 1989. KLF 004T was re-released in the UK on 15 July 1991, during the peak of the KLF's chart success, along with both "Pure Trance" mixes of 3 a.m. Eternal.

Format (and countries)	Track number		
Format (and countries)	1	2	3
12" single (UK – KLF Communications KLF 4T, Germany)	PT1	PT2	
12" single (UK – KLF Communications, KLF 4R)	Pr	TS	PT1
12" single (US)	Oz	PT1	TS
12" single (Austria)	Po	PT2	po2
CD single (Austria)	po1	PT1	PT2

Key

PT1 – "What Time Is Love?" (Pure Trance Original) (7:05)	Oz – "What Time Is Love?" (Live version, "Land of Oz") (8:46)
PT2 – "What Time Is Love?" (Pure Trance Mix 2) (7:00)	po1 - "What Time Is Love? (Power Remix)" (7” edit) (3:54)
Pr – "What Time Is Love? (Primal Remix)" (5:57)	po2 – "What Time Is Love? (Power Remix)" (7" evil edit) (3:41)
TS – "What Time Is Love? (Techno Slam Mix)" (4:28)	Po – "What Time Is Love? (Power Remix)" (7:37)

=== Live at Trancentral ===
"What Time Is Love? (Live from Trancentral)" was released on 30 July 1990, and the single of remixes "(Remodelled & Remixed)" followed on 20 August 1990. The main B-side accompaniment of "What Time Is Love? (Live at Trancentral)" was the "Techno Gate Mix" of the track, which retained the title track's rhythm and bass as a backdrop to extensive samples of Jimi Hendrix's "Voodoo Child (Slight Return)". Another UK 12" featured instead the "Wandaful Mix", which sampled from Wanda Dee's "To the Bone".

Format (and countries)	Track number			
Format (and countries)	1	2	3	4
Live at Trancentral
7" single (UK, France, Australia), cassette single (UK, Australia), CD single (Belgium)	l	TG		
7" single (Australia)	l	PT1		
12" single (UK, US, Germany, Australia), cassette single (Australia), CD single (US)	L	TG		
12" single (Denmark, Sweden)	L	Pr	PT1	TG
12" single (France, Australia)	L	PT1		
12" single (UK)	L	W		
CD single (UK, Germany, France, Belgium)	l	L	PT1	
CD single (Australia)	l	PT1	M	
CD single (US)	L	TG		
CD single (Japan, This Is What The KLF Is About I)	l	M	PT2	
Remodelled & Remixed
12" single (UK – KLF Communications KLF 4Y, Germany)	M	E	V	

Key

l – "What Time Is Love? (Live at Trancentral)" (radio edit) (3:53)	W – "What Time Is Love? (Wandaful Mix)" (6:07)
L – "What Time Is Love? (Live at Trancentral)" (5:20)	M – "What Time Is Love? (The Moody Boys vs. The KLF)" (7:35)
TG – "What Time Is Love? (Techno Gate Mix)" (4:44)	E – "What Time Is Love? (Echo & the Bunnymen Mix)" (5:10)
Pr – "What Time Is Love? (Primal Remix)" (5:57)	V – "What Time Is Love? (Virtual Reality Mix)" (6:50)
PT1 – "What Time Is Love?" (Pure Trance Original) (7:05)	PT2 – "What Time Is Love?" (Pure Trance Mix 2) (7:05)

=== America: What Time Is Love? ===
"America: What Time Is Love?" was released in the US during October 1991, four months before its release in the UK and elsewhere (24 February 1992). The B-side "America No More", which featured anti-war sentiments directed at US foreign policy and included samples of contemporary Gulf War dialogue, was not included on the US releases. Unlike previous single releases of "What Time Is Love?", no commercial remixes of "America" were released, although five edits of different lengths were distributed.

Format (and countries)	Track number				
Format (and countries)	1	2	3	4	5
Cassette single (except US), 7" single	a	N			
12" single, cassette single (US)	A2	L2	M		
12" single (UK – KLF Communications KLF USA 4X, Germany, Australia, Denmark)	A	N			
12" single (UK – KLF Communications, KLF USA 4T)	AU	N			
CD single (US)	a2	A2	L2	M	
CD single (UK, Germany, Australia, Denmark, Belgium)	a	N	AU	n	
CD single (Austria)	A	N	AU	L	PT1
CD single (Japan)	l	A2			

Key

a – "America: What Time Is Love?" (radio edit) (3:30)	n – "America No More (Just the Pipe Band)" (3:18)
a2 – "America: What Time Is Love?" (7" edit) (4:05)	l – "What Time Is Love? (Live at Trancentral)" (radio edit) (3:53)
A – "America: What Time Is Love?" (7:34)	L – "What Time Is Love? (Live at Trancentral)" (5:20)
L2 – "What Time Is Love? (Live at Trancentral)" (5:03)	A2 – "America: What Time Is Love?" (12" mix) (8:35)
M – "What Time Is Love? (The Moody Boys vs. The KLF)" (7:35)	AU – "America: What Time Is Love? (Uncensored)" (9:02)
PT1 – "What Time Is Love?" (Pure Trance Original) (7:05)	N – "America No More" (6:05)

== Charts ==
=== Weekly charts ===
"What Time Is Love?" (live at the Trancentral)

Chart (1990–1991)	Peak position
Australia (ARIA)	73
Austria (Ö3 Austria Top 40)	23
Belgium (Ultratop 50 Flanders)	31
Denmark (IFPI)	8
Europe (Eurochart Hot 100)	18
Finland (Suomen virallinen lista)	14
Germany (GfK)	6
Israel (Israeli Singles Chart)	3
Luxembourg (Radio Luxembourg)	4
Netherlands (Dutch Top 40)	23
Netherlands (Single Top 100)	15
New Zealand (Recorded Music NZ)	44
Sweden (Sverigetopplistan)	14
Switzerland (Schweizer Hitparade)	23
UK Singles (OCC)	5
UK Dance (Music Week)	2
UK Indie (Music Week)	1

"America: What Time Is Love?"

Chart (1992)	Peak position
Australia (ARIA)	40
Austria (Ö3 Austria Top 40)	3
Belgium (Ultratop 50 Flanders)	6
Denmark (IFPI)	1
Europe (Eurochart Hot 100)	5
Finland (Suomen virallinen lista)	2
France (SNEP)	29
Germany (GfK)	6
Greece (IFPI)	7
Ireland (IRMA)	4
Netherlands (Dutch Top 40)	6
Netherlands (Single Top 100)	4
New Zealand (Recorded Music NZ)	23
Norway (VG-lista)	2
Portugal (AFP)	8
Sweden (Sverigetopplistan)	6
Switzerland (Schweizer Hitparade)	3
UK Singles (OCC)	4
UK Airplay (Music Week)	22
UK Dance (Music Week)	20
UK Club Chart (Music Week)	81
UK Indie (Music Week)	1
US Hot 100 (Billboard)	57
US Dance Club Play (Billboard)	13

=== Year-end charts ===
"What Time Is Love?" (live at the Trancentral)

Chart (1990)	Position
Europe (Eurochart Hot 100)	96
Germany (Media Control)	100
Sweden (Topplistan)	77
UK Club Chart (Record Mirror)	48

"America: What Time Is Love?"

Chart (1992)	Position
Austria (Ö3 Austria Top 40)	28
Belgium (Ultratop)	70
Europe (Eurochart Hot 100)	25
Germany (Media Control)	54
Netherlands (Dutch Top 40)	76
Netherlands (Single Top 100)	53
Sweden (Topplistan)	33
Switzerland (Schweizer Hitparade)	23
