= Outlaw Posse =

Outlaw Posse was a British hip hop group formed by Bello B (real name Isaac Bello) and K-Gee (real name Karl Gordon). They also recorded together as Outlaw and Brothers Like Outlaw, before the group finally split in 1992.

== Biography ==
K-Gee started out as a drummer in the school band, but soon had a residency as a DJ in the Fringe in London. Together with his school friend Bello B, K-Gee used to rap over beats and basslines and record their efforts onto tape. The duo called themselves the Outlaw Posse, and the tapes they recorded came to the attention of DJ Richie Rich, who was making his name as both a club DJ and a recording artist in his own right. He was also the owner of Gee Street Records, and was impressed enough with the group to offer them some time in a recording studio. The tunes the group put together became their successful debut album, My Afro's On Fire! (Gee Street, 1990), an album that was dedicated to Bello B's late brother, Bentil Bello.

Tours with Arrested Development and the Brand New Heavies followed, as the group went through their first change of name, releasing the singles "Party Time" and "Good Vibrations", both featuring the singer and songwriter Alison Evelyn (Gee Street, 1992) as Outlaw. The name did not last until the end of the year, and by the release of their final album the name had changed again to Brothers Like Outlaw. The album was well received amongst the fans and the music press, but the dissatisfaction with their name echoed the group's growing dissatisfaction with each other - their final album's title The Oneness of Two Minds In Unison (Gee Street, 1992) clearly intended to be ironic. Citing musical differences, the group split and went their separate ways in 1992 - although more recently K-Gee has stated that the group were actually recording a third album and split because of Gee Street's delays in putting out new material.

K-Gee went on to gain respect as a bootleg remixer, which eventually led to more official work coming his way. He is now most well known as the co-producer of several of the pop group All Saints' biggest hits, including their debut single, "I Know Where It's At" (London Records, 1997). Bello B went on to have a career as a solo artist, guesting on tracks by artists such as Dodge City Productions and rapping on The KLF's hit single "America: What Time Is Love?" (KLF Communications, 1992). He also released the single "Daddy on the Run" (Amber Records, 1994) as Mistah Bello, which featured remixes by his old colleague K-Gee. Nowadays, the duo have put their differences behind them and remain good friends.

Their previously unreleased album, My Afro's On Fire Vol. 2, became available in 2018. This album was initially recorded in 1993 but was held back due to legal issues.

In 2020, they released a new single called "Prophecy".

== Discography ==
- My Afro's on Fire! (1990), Gee Street
- The Oneness of Two Minds in Unison (1992), Gee Street
- My Afro's On Fire! Vol. 2 (2018), Self-released
