= Lloyd Stanton =

British film producer

- Occupation(s): film and television writer, director and producer
- Years active: 1987 – present

Lloyd Stanton is a British film producer. In 2013, he produced a low-budget film, Wizard's Way, which won a LOCO Discovery Award and was optioned by Jack Black. In 2015, he directed and produced the film Dying Laughing starring Kevin Hart, Chris Rock, Jerry Seinfeld and Sarah Silverman.
