= Doctorin' the Tardis =

1988 single by the Timelords

Single by the Timelords
- Released: 23 May 1988
- Studio: Trancentral
- Genre: Novelty
- Length: 3:37 (radio); 4:28 (minimal); 8:15 (club mix)
- Label: KLF Communications
- Songwriters: Mike Chapman; Nicky Chinn; Gary Glitter; Mike Leander; Ron Grainer; Bill Drummond; Jimmy Cauty
- Producers: Bill Drummond; Jimmy Cauty

The Timelords singles chronology
"Burn the Bastards" (1988)	"Doctorin' the Tardis" (1988)	"What Time Is Love? (Pure Trance)" (1988)

Audio sample
- file; help

Music video
- "Doctorin' the Tardis" on YouTube

"Doctorin' the Tardis" is a novelty single by the Timelords ("Time Boy" and "Lord Rock", aliases of Bill Drummond and Jimmy Cauty, better known as the KLF). The song is predominantly a mash-up of the Doctor Who theme music and Gary Glitter's "Rock and Roll" with sections from "Block Buster!" by the Sweet. The single was not well received by critics but was a commercial success, hitting number one on the UK and New Zealand singles charts, and reaching the top 10 in Australia, Finland, Ireland and Norway.

The Timelords followed up their chart-topping record with a "how to have a number one" guide, The Manual (How to Have a Number One the Easy Way).

== Context ==
The release of "Doctorin' the Tardis" followed a self-imposed break from recording of Drummond and Cauty's sampling outfit, the Justified Ancients of Mu Mu (the JAMs). The single continued the JAMs' strategy of sampling and juxtaposing popular musical works. However, unlike the cultish limited releases of the JAMs, in which Drummond's Clydeside rapping and social commentary were regular ingredients, "Doctorin' The Tardis" was an excursion into the musical mainstream, with the change of name to "The Timelords" and an overt reliance on several iconic symbols of 1970s and 1980s British popular culture, including Gary Glitter's "Rock and Roll Parts 1 and 2", the Doctor Who theme tune, Doctor Who's Daleks and the TARDIS, the Sweet's "Block Buster!" and Harry Enfield's character Loadsamoney. The song also featured the "You what?" chant from Steve Walsh's version of the Fatback Band's "I Found Lovin'". "We were going to make a dance record", Drummond explained, "a house recording using the Doctor Who theme tune... Jimmy had been working on some rhythms for it and he played it for me in the car when we were driving down to the studio... and I said 'that's a Glitter beat, we can't have a Glitter beat on a house record, that won't work at all'... [by the] third day [of working on it] we realised we'd got a number one single". "We just had to go with it in the end" agreed Cauty. Drummond recalled the experience in a BBC Radio 1 interview with Richard Skinner in late 1990. Skinner called the record an "aberration", to which Drummond pleaded "guilty", adding that "we justified it all by saying to ourselves 'We're celebrating a very British thing here... you know, something that Timmy Mallett understands'".

In a KLF Communications information sheet, Drummond called "Doctorin' the Tardis" "probably the most nauseating record in the world" (a claim also made on the label of the record itself) but added that "we also enjoyed celebrating the trashier side of pop".

== Ford Timelord ==
Credit for the "Talent" behind the song was attributed not to Drummond (Time Boy) and Cauty (Lord Rock) but to "Ford Timelord", Cauty's 1968 Ford Custom American police car reg plate "WGU 18G", formerly known as the JAMsmobile. The car, which had previously appeared on the cover of the JAMs' album Who Killed The JAMs?, was thematically tailored to the JAMs, depicting their 'pyramid blaster' emblem on its doors and the number 23 on its roof; it was also Cauty's daily driver. Cauty and Drummond claimed that Ford gave them instructions on how to make the record. Ford featured prominently on the sleeve of "Doctorin' the Tardis", where he is quoted as saying "Hi! I'm Ford Timelord. I'm a car, and I've made a record", and "...I mixed and matched some tunes we all know and love, got some mates down and made this record. Sounds like a hit to me". Promotion of the single centred around Ford Timelord who was even "interviewed" on television.

The "Doctorin' the Tardis" music video features Ford Timelord driving around the countryside in pursuit of some rather crudely designed Daleks, his wailing siren audible throughout. The music video was filmed in central Wiltshire, England. Two of Wiltshire's landmarks, the Cherhill White Horse and the Lansdowne Monument, can be seen in the video. The video was filmed in part at the now defunct RAF Yatesbury, a Royal Air Force base in Wiltshire, and—according to the Timelords—cost in the region of £8,000 to make.

== Critical reception ==
Melody Maker described "Doctorin' the Tardis" as "pure, unadulterated agony ... excruciating". Sounds reasoned that it was "a record so noxious that a top ten place can be its only destiny", calling it a "rancid reworking of ancient discs".

In a retrospective look at novelty records and a defence of the genre, Peter Paphides wrote in The Observer's music monthly that "the one novelty record most people admit to liking is 'Doctorin' The Tardis' by The Timelords... The reason for this, presumably, is that it's nice to be in on the same joke as arch pop ironist Bill Drummond. Fine, but let's not forget that if The KLF weren't passionate about how brilliantly dumb pop can be they wouldn't have got to Number One." The "reason we purport to hate novelty records", he argued, "is because we continue to romanticise the creative process. We feel that our intelligence is insulted by novelty."

A 1994 piece in The Guardian called "Doctorin'" a "piss-take". "It was a triumph for Trash Art and it spent exactly one week at the top of the chart. Perfect."

Music critic Tom Ewing, writing for Freaky Trigger, later gave the song a 9/10 in a series where he individually reviews every UK number one single ever, saying it mixes the Doctor Who theme tune "with the pop sounds of 1974, the year of glam rock and Davros, scarves on the Rollers and scarves on the new Doctor, glitterbeat and “Blockbuster” airhorns. It's a companion piece to "Theme From S'Express" in that sense and just as good – part of the same rediscovery of the 70s, beckoning the boy gangs of yobs and nerds onto the dancefloor, the ones Mark Moore didn't invite to his party. You could put it in a line of descent from 'Hoots Mon' and 'Mouldy Old Dough' too – novelty monsters which catch a time more truly than some of the serious songs do."

== Legacy ==
The Timelords released one other product on the strength of "Doctorin' the Tardis", a 1989 book called The Manual (How to Have a Number One the Easy Way), in which they candidly described the logistical processes and efforts that sealed the record's commercial success.

After the Timelords, Drummond and Cauty became The KLF. An American CD reissue of the single in 1991 lists the artist as the Timelords/the KLF, and features both a KLF track (the original Pure Trance version of "What Time Is Love?") and "Gary In The Tardis" (retitled "Gary Joins the JAMS" on this release), a version of "Doctorin' the Tardis" with vocals by Gary Glitter referencing his own songs.

While The KLF's string of "Stadium House" singles, beginning with "What Time Is Love?", found large popular appeal and worldwide chart success, other later specific attempts of Drummond and Cauty to top the charts were less successful. The KLF's "Kylie Said to Jason" in 1989 failed to achieve the chart success for which it was designed, peaking outside the Top 100, and Cauty's novelty project Solid Gold Chartbusters with Guy Pratt, which was designed to achieve a 1999 Christmas number one single, did not reach the UK Top 40. A track on the 2005 American Edit mash-up project, titled "Doctor Who On Holiday" combines "Doctorin' the Tardis" with Green Day's "Holiday".

== Formats and track listing ==
"Doctorin' the Tardis" was given an international single release on 23 May 1988. In the US it was re-issued in 1991, containing The KLF's "What Time Is Love? (Pure Trance Original)". The formats and track listings are tabulated below: The song was released on streaming services as part of the "Solid State Logik 1" album on 1 January 2021.

Format (and countries)	Track number					
Format (and countries)	1	2	3	4	5	6
7-inch single (except US), 10-inch picture disc single (UK)	DR	DM				
7-inch single (US)	DR	GT				
12-inch single (KLF 003T)	DR	DM	DC			
12-inch single (KLF 003R)	GT	GM	GJ			
CD Video single (UK)	DV	DM	DC			
Cassette single (US)	DC	GT				
1988 CD single (US)	DR	DC	GJ			
1991 CD single (US)	DR	DC	W	GT	DM	
CD single (Canada)	GT	GM	GJ	DR	DM	DC
CD single (Benelux)	DR	DC	DM	GT	GM	GJ

Key

- DR – "Doctorin' the Tardis" (radio edit / 7-inch mix) (3:37)
- DC – "Doctorin' the Tardis" (club mix / 12-inch mix / Mega mix / extended mix) (8:15)
- DM – "Doctorin' the Tardis" (minimal / instrumental) (4:28)
- DV – "Doctorin' the Tardis" (video mix) (2:20)
- GT – "Gary in the Tardis" (3:26)
- GM – "Gary in the Tardis" (minimal) (4:08)
- GJ – "Gary Joins the JAMs" (usually 6:22)
- W – "What Time Is Love?" (Pure Trance original) (7:06)

== Charts ==
=== Weekly charts ===
Chart (1988–1991)	Peak position
Australia (ARIA)	2
Belgium (Ultratop 50 Flanders)	7
Denmark (Hitlisten)	15
Europe (Eurochart Hot 100)	6
Finland (Suomen virallinen lista)	9
Ireland (IRMA)	4
Netherlands (Dutch Top 40)	19
Netherlands (Single Top 100)	25
New Zealand (Recorded Music NZ)	1
Norway (VG-lista)	10
UK Singles (Official Charts)	1
US Billboard Hot 100	66
US 12-inch Singles Sales (Billboard)	18
US Dance Club Play (Billboard)	16
US Modern Rock Tracks (Billboard)	17
West Germany (GfK)	28

=== Year-end charts ===
Chart (1988)	Position
Australia (ARIA)	15
Belgium (Ultratop)	92
New Zealand (RIANZ)	10
UK Singles (OCC)	52
