= Last Train to Trancentral =

1990 single by the KLF

- Pure Trance Original cover

Single by the KLF
- Released: March 1990 (Pure Trance 5); 22 April 1991 (Live from the Lost Continent)
- Recorded: Trancentral
- Genre: Electronic
- Length: 6:42
- Label: KLF Communications (UK)
- Songwriters: Jimmy Cauty; Bill Drummond; Ricardo Lyte
- Producer: Bill Drummond & Jimmy Cauty

The KLF singles chronology
| "Kylie Said to Jason" (1989) | "Last Train to Trancentral" (1990) | "What Time Is Love? (Live at Trancentral)" (1990) |

Drummond and Cauty singles chronology
| "3 a.m. Eternal (Live at the S.S.L.)" (1991) | "Last Train to Trancentral (Live from the Lost Continent)" (1991) | "America: What Time Is Love?" (1991) |

Music video
- "Last Train to Trancentral (Live from the Lost Continent)" on YouTube

Alternative covers
- Live from the Lost Continent cover

"Last Train to Trancentral" is a song released, in different mixes, as a series of singles by British electronic band the KLF, including "Last Train to Trancentral (Live from the Lost Continent)". A commercially successful single of April 1991, it reached number two on the UK Singles Chart, number one on the UK Dance Singles Chart and achieved international top ten placings. In the US, it reached numbers 17 and 86 on the Billboard Dance Singles Sales chart and the Cash Box Top 100. It is a central song within the KLF's work, and is distinctive for an uplifting string-synthesiser break.

== Origins and versions ==
"Last Train to Trancentral" is related to the KLF's unreleased earlier tracks "E-Train to Trancentral" and, from the 1989 soundtrack to their film The White Room, "Go to Sleep". Both the film and the soundtrack were abandoned in 1989, due to spiralling costs and the commercial failure of the soundtrack single "Kylie Said to Jason". However, much of the musical material was salvaged and substantially remodelled to form the basis of their later, commercially successful work. In particular, bootlegged copies of "Go to Sleep" reveal many chord sequences and melodies later used in "Last Train to Trancentral".

One month prior to the "Pure Trance" single release, many of the same core elements were also used in ambient form during the tracks "Wichita Lineman was a Song I Once Heard" and "Trancentral Lost in My Mind" on the KLF's third album, Chill Out (1990).

=== Pure Trance version ===
The original March 1990 12" single constituted the third of the KLF's "Pure Trance" series. The sleeve, emblazoned with the number 5, reflects the KLF's prior intention that this be the fifth contribution to the series, but two titles ("Love Trance" and "Turn up the Strobe") were never released despite the sleeves having been printed.

The "Pure Trance" version of "Last Train to Trancentral" is a minimalist ambient house reworking of "Go to Sleep", stripped of the female vocals and all but one line ("And from somewhere, I hear") of the KLF co-founder Bill Drummond's narration. It features a strained, chordless synthesiser melody and a progressive instrumental build-up into a string-orchestrated break. Some parts of the track are purely percussive, punctuated by the bleats of sheep. The track was incorporated into the KLF's February 1990 album, Chill Out (most prominently on the track "Wichita Lineman Was a Song I Once Heard"), an album for which they have been credited as pioneers of the ambient house genre. Indeed, upon its release, "Last Train to Trancentral (Pure Trance version)" was not easily categorised, with Record Mirror claiming that "it isn't a dance track".

"Last Train to Trancentral (Pure Trance version)"
A more upbeat section of the track, leading into percussive ambience.

"Last Train to Trancentral (Live from the Lost Continent)"
The same chord sequence, given the full-on "Stadium House" treatment.

"Last Train to Trancentral (LP version)"
The distinctive string-orchestrated break.

=== LP version ===
In March 1991, a version of "Last Train to Trancentral" appeared on the KLF LP The White Room. Featuring vocals by reggae musician Black Steel and a rap by Ricardo Da Force, this house reworking follows a conventional song structure, with a rhythm that mimics the sound of a train in motion along its tracks. It uses the theme of a journey to bridge the two sides of the LP, from uptempo pop-house music to a downtempo collection of songs.

=== Stadium House version ===
In April 1991, some elements of the "LP Version" were further reworked into a commercially minded single release. Entitled "Last Train to Trancentral (Live from the Lost Continent)", this was the third and final instalment of the KLF's so-called "Stadium House Trilogy" of singles, following up "What Time Is Love?" and "3 a.m. Eternal" during the peak of the band's mainstream popularity. This version reached number two on the UK Singles Chart, and found top ten chart success internationally. The track preserves the chord progression and string break of previous versions, placed in the context of a relentless, sample-filled rave arrangement. Unlike the prior Stadium House offerings, Ricardo Da Force's rap was removed, except for "This is what The KLF is about, also known as The Justified Ancients of Mu Mu, furthermore known as The JAMs...", but the trilogy is consolidated by the presence of distinctive samples from both "What Time Is Love?" and "3 a.m. Eternal". As with much of the KLF's output, the track is jubilant and highly self-referential, purporting that it has a message to deliver yet proceeding with deliberate ambiguity. Also typical of the KLF, it refers to The Illuminatus! Trilogy novels and the Lost Continent of Mu. The song features on the KLF's video The Stadium House Trilogy.

A remix 12" credited to The Moody Boys was released alongside the Stadium House arrangement. Entitled "The KLF Meets The Moody Boys Uptown", The Moody Boys' remixes bear little resemblance to the released song, drawing on parts of "Go to Sleep" that are not common to other versions of "Last Train to Trancentral", and a sample of "Jupiter, Bringer of Jollity" from The Planets suite by Gustav Holst, which was allegedly meant to be used as an intro in "E-Train to Trancentral".

The song opens with a sampled American-accented voice saying "Okay, everybody, lie down on the floor and keep calm," reportedly spoken by KLF publicist Scott Piering.

== Reaction and influence ==
Larry Flick from Billboard magazine commented, "Matching the brilliantly kooky, Tammy Wynette-fronted 'Justified & Ancient' is a tall order, but the mysterious production team succeeds by sticking to an enticing combo of odd samples, funky beats, and anthemic chorus chants."

A reviewer from Record Mirror noted the "ethereal atmospherics" of the "Pure Trance" version, but the single was poorly received by Melody Maker, who interpreted it as a joke: "'Look how mischievous we are', the fatheads giggle!" In 1991, the magazine's Everett True wrote, "'Last Train' completes the triumvirate of singles which started with 'What Time Is Love?' and continued with '3am Eternal'. It's in pretty much the same vein — loads of samples cheering, chanting, mentions of The Justified Ancients Of Mu Mu and sequenced vocals. It's awesome, no mistaking that — and different enough to be another smasheroonie." In comparing "Last Train to Trancentral (Live from the Lost Continent)" to the KLF single "Justified and Ancient", Simon Williams from NME called the former a "sheer frantic rush". NME also named the single as 15th best of 1991.

Caroline Sullivan from Smash Hits wrote about the song, "'Last Train' follows the '3am Eternal' formula: a live feel, huge, swirlaway beat and insanely catchy chorus. "All aboard, all aboard, woh-oh," barks the singer, and you immediately want to put your hands in the air and shake them like you just don't care."

Allan Harrison from Splendid Magazine said of the LP version, "The cries of "Mu Mu! Mu Mu! Mu Mu! Mu Mu!" take on a strangely liberating, mantra-like feel. It's the essence of great pop music, of great dance music, wholly compressed."

In 1999, Tom Ewing of Freaky Trigger ranked the song at number 42 in his list of the "Top 100 Singles of the 90s", saying "No band understood the possibilities for mass lunacy contained in the new music as well as did the KLF. [...] Read a copy of The Manual, Bill Drummond and Jimmy Cauty’s pricelessly cynical dissection of the process needed to have a No.1 hit, and the depth of their understanding begins to show through. For novelty scam-mongers and pranksters, they knew the public well, particularly that strain in British pop listening which likes an occasional brush with the gigantic. The KLF did to house what Jim Steinman did to rock – they turned it into a thing of tottering grand opera absurdity, pushed the excitement in the music to hysteria, traded content for ever-huger gesture. The difference being that the KLF never lost track of what made the music special in the first place. Maybe because there’s less inherent ‘meaning’ in the KLF's music, or maybe just because the ‘meaning’ in house music is less fragile, I don’t know, but no matter how vast 'Last Train To Trancentral' sounds, it never loses its happy grip on your feet and heart."

"Last Train to Trancentral (Live from the Lost Continent)" is used in the finale for Blue Man Group's theatrical show. Blue Man Group produced a special 5.1 version of the song utilizing some of their invented instruments for their newer performance venues. Blue Man Group's The Complex features pieces from the so-called "Rock Concert Instruction Manual", a tongue-in-cheek deconstruction of pop music and the rock concert experience; this alludes to the KLF Communications publication The Manual. Their cover version was released as a single in 2006.

== Trancentral ==
Trancentral was described as "the spiritual home of The KLF". This concept is reinforced by the "LP Version" of "Last Train to Trancentral", which describes the journey to Trancentral as a spiritual awakening, and the place itself a forum for spiritual realisation. Describing his journey, rapper Ricardo Da Force says "A brand new day is dawning, a light that will anoint me, a sign from the subconscious, an angel sent to guide me, the searchin' will be over, the call will now be gentle...". He also says, "Relax - there's only one place I'm headed now: I'm going into Trancentral where I can, you understand, liberate and free the psyche, balance my mind and my body...". The KLF's later output implied that Trancentral was analogous to "Mu Mu Land" - the Lost Continent of Mu - and that the KLF's journey "home" was ultimately unsuccessful.

In reality, Trancentral was the name of the KLF's recording studio in Stockwell, that was also the KLF co-founder Jimmy Cauty's squat. Cauty lived at Trancentral for approximately 12 years until Autumn 1991, claiming on one occasion, "I hate the place. I've no alternative but to live here". Trancentral was described in February 1991 by a visiting Melody Maker journalist, who noted:

The KLF's 'Trancentral' logo: speakers arranged in a 'T' shape.

There's little evidence of fame or fortune. The kitchen is heated by means of leaving the three functioning gas rings on at full blast until the fumes make us all feel stoned, there's a bag of litter in the hallway that everybody trips over going in and out of the place, as well as a very old motorbike... And, pinned just above a working top cluttered with chipped mugs is a letter from a five-year-old fan, featuring a crayon drawing of the band.

Trancentral circa 1989 was described retrospectively as:

...a huge Victorian terraced house. In the basement were the ersatz 'Trancentral Studios', where [the KLF's] finest moments were recorded. The upper floors were home to Cauty and wife Cressida, herself an artist, and several others. Friends recall the good times, at the height of the acid-rave scene, when the KLF would throw 'really brilliant fuck-off parties', sometimes lasting all weekend, with a fairly relaxed attitude to uninvited house guests".

"Trancentral" is often mentioned in the KLF's work, and is the likely motivation behind a motif of the KLF, in which speakers are arranged to form a capital T. This logo appeared on KLF Communications recordings and merchandise.

The name "Trancentral" lived on throughout the mid to late 1990s, giving its name to a series of psychedelic trance and acid techno nights at the Tyssen Street studios in Hackney.

== Cover versions ==
- In 1999, Blue Man Group covered this song for the finale of their theatrical performances.
- An iTunes exclusive 102 compilation released by Suite 102 called The Ultimate Rave Party featured a cover of the song by Tokyo Soul.
- In 2006, Slusnik Luna vs. Lowland released a remake of "Last Train To Trancentral".

== Personnel ==
"Last Train to Trancentral (Pure Trance version)" was written and performed by the KLF (Bill Drummond and Jimmy Cauty). For other versions of the song, credit is given to Drummond and Cauty for production, performance and programming. Additional contributors on these versions include:

- Ricardo da Force - rap and narration
- Black Steel - vocals (except Moody Boys versions)
- Wanda Dee - vocals (the sample "Come on board, d'ya wanna ride?") ("Live from the Lost Continent")
- Maxine Harvey - vocals ("LP version", Moody Boys versions)
- Nick Coler - keyboards
- Tony Thorpe - 'groove consultant' ("Live from the Lost Continent"), remixing (Moody Boys versions)

== Formats and track listings ==
"Last Train to Trancentral (Pure Trance remix)" was aired as a UK 12" single in March 1990, in an issue limited to 2000 copies. "Last Train to Trancentral (Live from the Lost Continent)" was given an international release as a single on 22 April 1991. A single of remixes by The Moody Boys was given a limited release on 6 May 1991.

| Format (and countries) | Track number | | |
| Format (and countries) | 1 | 2 | 3 |
|---|---|---|---|
Pure Trance 5
| 12" (UK) | PR | PO | |
Live from the Lost Continent
| 7" single, cassette single | lc | H | |
| 12" single (US) | H | LC | V |
| 12" single (Denmark) | LC | lc | H |
| 12" single (elsewhere) | LC | H | |
| CD single (Austria) | LC | H | PO |
| CD single (elsewhere) | lc | H | PO |
KLF Meets The Moody Boys Uptown
| 12" single, CD single | B | R | V |

Key

- PO - "Last Train to Trancentral (Pure Trance Original)" (6:44)
- PR - "Last Train to Trancentral (Pure Trance Remix)" (5:50)
- lc - "Last Train to Trancentral (Live from the Lost Continent)" (radio edit) (3:37)
- LC - "Last Train to Trancentral (Live from the Lost Continent)" (5:36)
- H - "Last Train to Trancentral (The Iron Horse)" (4:12)
- V - "Last Train to Trancentral (Mu D. Vari-Speed Version)" (6:50)
- B - "Last Train to Trancentral (808Bass Mix)" (6:15)
- R - "Last Train to Trancentral (120 Rock Steady)" (6:09)

== Charts ==
=== Weekly charts ===
| Chart (1991–1992) | Peak position |
|---|---|
| Australia (ARIA) | 5 |
| Austria (Ö3 Austria Top 40) | 6 |
| Belgium (Ultratop 50 Flanders) | 3 |
| Denmark (IFPI) | 1 |
| Europe (Eurochart Hot 100) | 3 |
| Europe (European Hit Radio) | 16 |
| Finland (Suomen virallinen lista) | 2 |
| France (SNEP) | 33 |
| Germany (GfK) | 4 |
| Greece (IFPI) | 1 |
| Israel (Israeli Singles Chart) | 2 |
| Luxembourg (Radio Luxembourg) | 2 |
| Netherlands (Dutch Top 40) | 2 |
| Netherlands (Single Top 100) | 1 |
| New Zealand (Recorded Music NZ) | 10 |
| Norway (VG-lista) | 4 |
| Spain (AFYVE) | 3 |
| Sweden (Sverigetopplistan) | 5 |
| Switzerland (Schweizer Hitparade) | 6 |
| UK Singles (Official Charts) | 2 |
| UK Airplay (Music Week) | 17 |
| UK Dance (Music Week) | 1 |
| UK Indie (Music Week) | 1 |
| UK Club Chart (Record Mirror) | 4 |
| US Dance Singles Sales (Billboard) | 17 |
| US Cash Box Top 100 | 86 |

=== Year-end charts ===
| Chart (1991) | Position |
|---|---|
| Australia (ARIA) | 42 |
| Belgium (Ultratop) | 9 |
| Europe (Eurochart Hot 100) | 16 |
| Germany (Media Control) | 28 |
| Israel (Israeli Singles Chart) | 31 |
| Netherlands (Dutch Top 40) | 40 |
| Netherlands (Single Top 100) | 17 |
| New Zealand (RIANZ) | 48 |
| Sweden (Topplistan) | 23 |
| Switzerland (Schweizer Hitparade) | 22 |
| UK Singles (OCC) | 30 |
| UK Club Chart (Record Mirror) | 59 |

== Certifications ==
| Region | Certification | Certified units/sales |
|---|---|---|
| Australia (ARIA) | Gold | 35,000^{^} |
^{^} Shipments figures based on certification alone.
