= Jimmy Cauty =

English artist and musician (born 1956)

- Born: James Francis Cauty; 19 December 1956 (age 69); Wirral, Cheshire, England
- Other names: Rockman Rock; Lord Rock; Space; Graybeard; Scourge of the Earth; Advanced Acoustic Armaments (AAA)
- Occupations: Musician; record producer; artist
- Years active: 1981–present
- Spouses: Cressida Bowyer (divorced); Alannah Currie (m. 2011)
- Children: 3
- Musical career
- Genres: Ambient house; electronic; pop; rock
- Instruments: Guitar; synthesiser
- Labels: KLF Communications; Blast First

James Francis Cauty (born 19 December 1956), also known as Rockman Rock, is an English artist and musician, best known as one-half of the duo the KLF, co-founder of the Orb and as the man who burnt £1 million.

He is married to artist and musician Alannah Currie, a former member of Thompson Twins.

== Early life and career ==
Cauty was born on the Wirral Peninsula. As a 17-year-old artist, he drew a popular The Lord of the Rings poster (and later, a counterpart based on The Hobbit) for British retailer Athena.

In 1981–82, Cauty was guitarist in a band called Angels 1–5, who recorded a Peel session on 1 July 1981. Lead vocalist was Cressida Bowyer, whom Cauty later married. He then joined the band Brilliant with which he remained until its break-up in 1986. Cauty was also an original member of Zodiac Mindwarp and the Love Reaction, in 1985.

== Artistic partnership with Bill Drummond ==
Cauty joined with Bill Drummond to form the Justified Ancients of Mu Mu (the JAMs), a collaboration that played out in various guises and media over much of the next decade.

As an A&R man, Drummond had signed Brilliant to WEA. Concocting a scheme for a hip-hop record on New Year's Day 1987, Drummond needed a like-minded collaborator with expertise in current music technology, and so contacted Cauty. Drummond later commented that Cauty "knew exactly, to coin a phrase, 'where I was coming from'". A week later, the JAMs had recorded their debut single, "All You Need Is Love". Several singles and three albums as the JAMs followed (their debut, 1987; the follow-up, Who Killed the JAMs?; and compilation Shag Times) before a change of direction saw the duo mutate into dance and ambient music pioneers, the KLF. The duo had their first British number one hit single as the Timelords with the Gary Glitter/Dr. Who novelty-pop mash-up "Doctorin' the Tardis", claimed to be sung by Cauty's 1968 Ford Galaxie American police car. During this period, Cauty also worked with Tony Thorpe of the Moody Boys; besides remix and production work by the Moody Boys for the KLF and vice versa, Thorpe and Cauty recorded the single "Journey into Dubland" together at the KLF's Trancentral studios.

The KLF released two albums, Chill Out and The White Room, and a string of top 5 singles, becoming the biggest selling singles act in the world in 1991. In 1992, suddenly and very publicly, the KLF retired from the music industry and deleted their entire back catalogue.

Drummond and Cauty re-emerged in 1993 as the K Foundation, releasing one limited edition single ("K Cera Cera") and awarding the £40,000 K Foundation art award for the "worst artist of the year". In 1994, the duo courted infamy by setting fire to one million pounds in cash on the Scottish island of Jura. In 1995, they undertook a screening tour of a film of the burning, before signing a moratorium on K Foundation activities.

Cauty worked with Drummond again in 1997 with a campaign to "Fuck the Millennium", the highlight of which was a 23-minute live performance satirising the "pop comeback", in which Cauty and Drummond appeared as grey-haired pensioners and wheeled around the stage in electric wheelchairs. They returned as The Justified Ancients of Mu Mu in 2017, with a novel - 2023: A Trilogy - and a 3-day festival, "Welcome to the Dark Ages". Cauty confirmed that the duo's work is an ongoing project.

Throughout their career, Drummond has often been the mouthpiece of the group and was sometimes viewed, subjectively, as their chief protagonist. NME, for example, wrote: "One suspects that the real boiling genius of the duo is initiated by Drummond. The elements of the K Foundation affair are classic Drummond – honesty mixed with deranged publicity-seeking, pop terrorism ideas mixed with utter strangeness and mysticism..., and a sense that the things pop groups do should be visionary and above all should not be mundane." However, the initial idea for the K Foundation's one million incineration was Cauty's, although he was beginning to express regret in 1995 at which time Drummond remained resolute.

Contrasting with Drummond's image, Jimmy Cauty was perceived, or presented, as "Rockman Rock – cool dude"; the "quiet", enigmatic one, a "long-haired and quietly spoken chain-smoker: a leather-jacketed misfit [who] has carried his adolescent rock obsession into adulthood". However, as the previously quoted NME piece cautioned, "We can't underestimate the importance of Jimmy Cauty". Cauty was the musical bedrock of The KLF, whether laying down the starting track for "Doctorin' the Tardis", or playing electric guitar, bass, drums and keyboard on "America: What Time Is Love?". He and his wife, Cressida, were at the centre of KLF operations, living and working at Trancentral (actually the Cautys' squat in Stockwell, London) and driving the "JAMsmobile" (Cauty's 1968 Ford Galaxie American police car) as their regular, everyday vehicle. Cressida, too, helped out, taking on an organisational role for KLF Communications, in addition to design and choreography work for The KLF, and her own work as an artist.

Engineer Mark Stent recalled Drummond as providing "big concepts and insane ideas", whereas Cauty - he said - was "literally a musical genius".

John Higgs wrote in The KLF: Chaos, Magic and the Band who Burned a Million Pounds that:

A simplified description of their partnership would portray Cauty as the musician and Drummond as the strategist, but this view doesn't hold up to scrutiny. All of the products of their partnership, whether musical or otherwise, came out of mutual agreement. Cauty is just as capable of burning stuff as Drummond.... Cauty is practical and above all curious, quick to get his hands dirty, experiment and see what happens. He is a catalyst.

== Ambient house, 1988–1992 ==
In the late 1980s, Cauty met Alex Paterson and the duo began DJing and producing together as the Orb. Paterson and Cauty's first release was a 1988 acid house anthem track, "Tripping on Sunshine" released on the compilation Eternity Project One, put together by Paterson's childhood friend and Cauty's ex-bandmate, Martin "Youth" Glover. The following year, the Orb released the Kiss EP, a four-track EP based on samples from New York City's Kiss FM on Paterson and Youth's new record label WAU/Mr. Modo Records.

After spending a weekend of making what Paterson described as "really shit drum sounds", the duo decided to abandon beat-heavy music and instead work on music for after-hours listening by "taking the bloody drums away". Paterson and Cauty began DJing in London and landed a deal in 1989 for the Orb to play the chill-out room at London nightclub Heaven. Resident DJ Paul Oakenfold brought in the duo specifically as ambient DJs for his "The Land of Oz" event at Heaven.

Though initially the Orb's Monday night performances had only several "hard-core" followers, their "Chill Out Room" act grew popular over the course of their six-month stay at Heaven to the point that the small room was often packed with around 100 people. The Orb's performances became especially popular among weary DJs and clubbers who sought solace from the loud, rhythmic music of the dancefloor. The Orb would build up melodies using multitrack recordings linked to multiple record decks and a mixer. They incorporated many CDs, cassettes, and BBC sound effects into their act, often accompanied with pieces of popular dance tracks such as "Sueño Latino". Most often, they played dub and other chill out music which Bill Drummond described as "Ambient house for the E generation."

Throughout 1989, Paterson, Cauty, Drummond and Youth developed the musical genre of ambient house through the use of a diverse array of samples and recordings. The culmination of Cauty and Paterson's musical work came towards the end of the year when the Orb recorded a session for John Peel on BBC Radio 1. The track, then known as "Loving You", was largely improvisational and featured a wealth of sound effects and samples from science fiction radio plays, nature sounds, and Minnie Riperton's "Lovin' You". The Orb changed the title to "A Huge Ever Growing Pulsating Brain That Rules from the Centre of the Ultraworld". In 1990, Cauty and Drummond held a chillout party at Trancentral, Cauty's squat. A recording of Patersons DJing was made with a view to releasing it as an LP but the mix contained many uncleared samples and other records and was unusable. Later that year Cauty and Drummond went to the isle of Jura, Scotland to record a techno record called Gate. Instead they created a long form ambient film called Waiting (1990). During the same year Cauty and Drummond went into the studio and made the ambient LP Chill Out. The Grove Dictionary suggests Chill Out to be the first ambient house album.

When offered an album deal by Big Life, the Orb found themselves at a crossroads. Cauty preferred that albums by the Orb were released on his KLF Communications label, whereas Paterson wanted to ensure the Orb did not become an offshoot of The KLF. Due to these issues, Cauty and Paterson split in April 1990, with Paterson keeping the name the Orb. Cauty removed Paterson's contributions from the recordings in progress and released the album as Space on KLF Communications.

== Post-KLF ==
In 1999 Cauty produced several remixes under the alias The Scourge of the Earth for Placebo, Marilyn Manson, Hawkwind, Ian Brown, the Orb, and others. In December 1999 he joined with Guy Pratt, Lloyd Stanton and Denise Palmer to record and release a mobile telephone-themed novelty-pop record "I Wanna 1-2-1 With You" under the name Solid Gold Chartbusters. It was released as competition for the Christmas Number One but only reached Number 62 in the UK Singles Chart.

In 2001, Cauty joined with former collaborators Alex Paterson and Pratt in a London recording studio, together with Dom Beken, an associate of Pratt. Recording later continued in Cauty's Brighton studio. In 2003, the group released their first single, "Boom Bang Bombay", under the name Custerd. Subsequently, they settled on the name "Transit Kings". Cauty left the band in 2004 to work on other projects. Two years later, the Transit Kings released their debut album, Living in a Giant Candle Winking at God; Cauty is listed as a composer on seven of the album's 12 tracks.

In 2002, Cauty's two remixes of U2's "New York" were featured as B-sides on the band's Electrical Storm single.

== Art ==
Cauty was, until mid-2005, part of art/music collective Blacksmoke, together with James Fogarty and manager Keir Jens-Smith.

Cauty works with the L-13 Light Industrial Workshop, London which he explains "is not a gallery, it's a support system, spiritual home and technical epicentre for a small group of artists" which includes Billy Childish, Jamie Reid, and Harry Adams. Cauty first worked in conjunction with L-13 on the Cautese Nationál Postal Disservice. Subsequent collaborations included the Riot in a Jam Jar exhibitions and the ADP Riot Tour - is a vast 1:87 scale model in a 40-foot shipping container which tours historic riot sites around the world. L-13 continue to collaborate with Cauty and Drummond, running "dead perch merch", official merchandise operatives to The JAMs.

Following 2003 media speculation that Saddam Hussein could launch a poison chemical attack on London, Cauty designed the Stamps of Mass Destruction for Blacksmoke Art Collective. The 1st, 2nd and 3rd class stamps featuring the Queen's head wearing a gas mask were released as limited edition prints and exhibited at Artrepublic Gallery, Brighton. Following a legal battle over alleged copyright infringement, the stamps were sent to Royal Mail for destruction.

In 2004, Cauty installed a gift shop, Blackoff, at the Aquarium Gallery, based on the UK government's Preparing for Emergencies leaflet. The installation included "terror aware" items, such as "terror tea towels", "attack hankies" and "bunker-buster jigsaw puzzles" (the latter missing one piece). He commented, "The gift shop becomes the place we can explore our branding ideas, Cash for trash – it represents the futility and the glory of it all."

In response to the Iraq War troop surge of 2007, Cauty developed Operation Magic Kingdom, a series of images showing US forces in Iraq wearing masks of lovable and friendly Disney characters, adopting the UK's "winning hearts and minds" tactics in a bid to gain the confidence of the Iraqi people. In Operation Magic Kingdom "the rules of engagement have been changed to include 'try and be more fun' before firing." The images were launched at the Bayswater Road Sunday Art Exhibition, bombed onto billboards and fly-posted across London, as well as being released by The Aquarium as limited edition prints and stamps.

In October 2008, Cauty and this then-teenage son Harry created an art exhibit at The Aqaurium which consisted of art pieces depicting Looney Tunes characters engaging in violent acts, such as shooting and crushing each other to death in order to illustrate the violence present in older cartoons. The exhibit, entitled Splatter, was released alongside two animated shorts created by fellow artist Robin Reeder.

In June 2011 he held a public exhibition at The Aquarium L-13 entitled A Riot in a Jam Jar consisting of a series of scale dioramas depicting violent confrontations between British rioters and police, each contained within an inverted glass jar. In 2012, Cauty premiered his short film, Believe the Magic, starring Debbie Harry, Nick Lehan and Branko Tomović, at Tate Modern as part of the annual Merge festival.

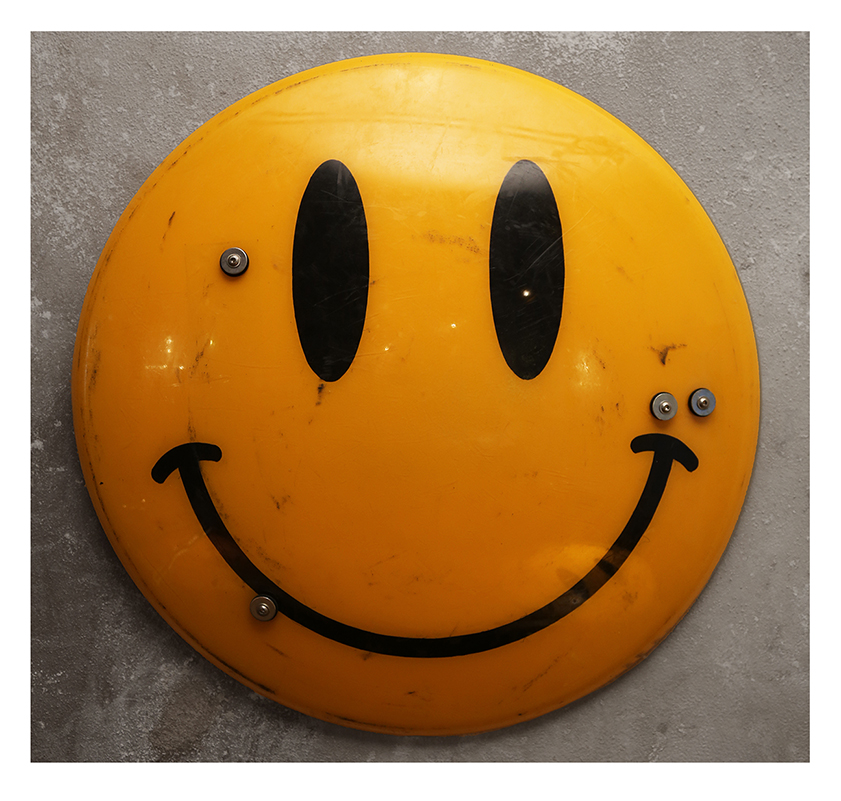
James Cauty Smiley Riot Shield, acrylic on appropriated ex-police riot shield, 2014

The ideas of A Riot in a Jam Jar evolved into the Aftermath Dislocation Principle, shown at the Hoxton Arches in October 2013. The 448-square-foot installation at 1:87 scale (representing approximately one square mile) details the desolate and charred aftermath of what appears to have been a devastating riot. The sculpture, constructed by modifying components of traditional model railway kits, took approximately 8 months to complete includes nearly 3,000 police figures and a soundtrack pitched to match the 1:87 scale. The piece "makes a political statement about societal freedom and state control". The Aftermath Dislocation principle then toured the Netherlands, being shown at Piet Hein Eek Gallery, Eindhoven (November 2013), Cultuurwerf, Vlissingen (April 2014), and Mediamatic, Amsterdam (July–August 2014).

In 2015, the work was exhibited at Banksy's Dismaland and then in London. Following this it was re-engineered to fit inside a 40-foot shipping container and now tours historic riot sites around the world.

In 2014, Cauty released a series of limited edition Smiley Riot Shields. Each are all ex-police riot gear painted over with a yellow smiley face. He originally designed the riot shields in 2012 as a symbol of "non-violent direct action" and as a practical self-protective measure for his step-daughter during the Occupy St Paul's eviction.

== Personal life ==
Cauty was married to Cressida (née Bowyer), with whom he has twins and a younger son. He later married artist and musician Alannah Currie (formerly of Thompson Twins) in 2011.

== See also ==
- Anti-art
