= Bluecoats Drum and Bugle Corps =

Junior drum and bugle corps based in Canton, Ohio

Bluecoats
- Location: North Canton, Ohio
- Division: World Class
- Founded: 1972
- Director: Mike Scott
- Championship titles: DCI: 2016; 2024; 2026

The Bluecoats Drum and Bugle Corps, or simply The Bluecoats, is a World Class competitive drum and bugle corps. Based in Canton, Ohio, the Bluecoats are a member corps of Drum Corps International (DCI). The Bluecoats have won the title of World Class Champion three times, in 2016, 2024, and 2026.

== History ==
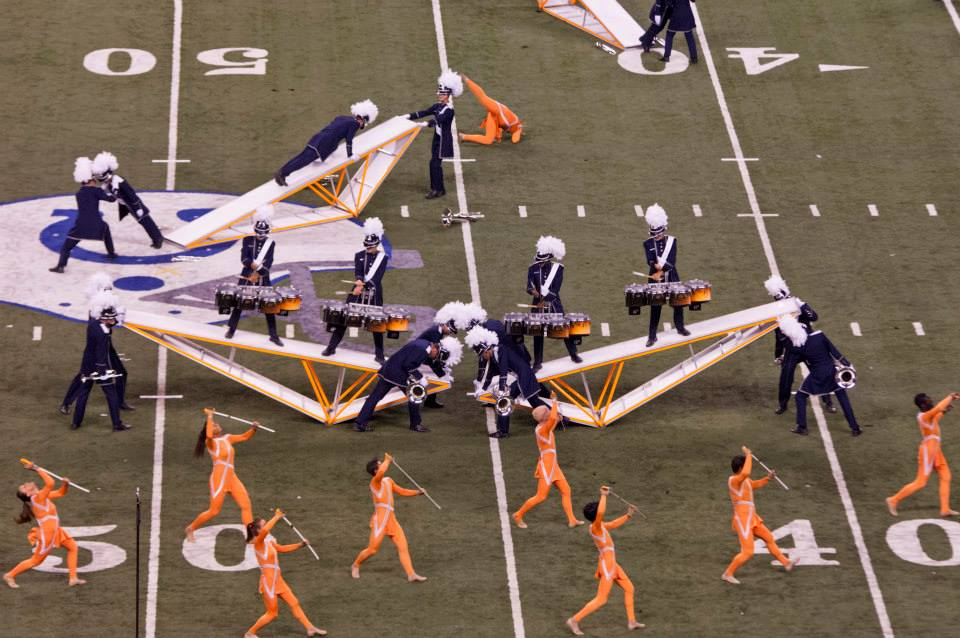
Bluecoats tenor drum players and guard performing at the 2014 DCI World Championship Finals in Indianapolis, Indiana.

The Bluecoats Drum and Bugle Corps was founded in 1972 by Canton businessman Art Drukenbrod and Canton police officers "Babe" Stearn and Ralph McCauley (the head and assistant directors of the Canton Police Boys' Club). The corps members chose the name both because of their sponsorship and to honor the city's police officers, particularly those who had retired from the ranks. The corps made its competition debut in 1974, and in their first major show, finished 32nd of 37 corps in the U.S. Open Class A preliminaries in Marion, Ohio. The corps improved year by year, and began touring in both the U.S. and Canada and making U.S. Open finals in 1976, taking second place in 1977 and third in 1978, and making World Class Finals for the first time in 1987. The Bluecoats made their first DCI appearance in Denver, Colorado, in 1977, scoring 35th place among 45 corps.

Although the corps was maturing musically, it was struggling to survive financially. In 1979, the corps only performed at local parades, as it attempted to reorganize its financial situation. With the return to the field in 1980, the corps was competitive in Class A competitions, but only managed a 38th-place finish of the 44 corps performing in Open Class at the DCI World Championships. In the next two seasons, the corps attempted to compete exclusively in Open Class, but they met with small success. In 1983, the Bluecoats Drum and Bugle Corps announced it would cease operations.

At the time that the corps' folding was announced, present-day corps President Scott Swaldo was a marching member. When he told his father, Canton industrialist Ted Swaldo, the elder Swaldo took over as director. Under the new director, the corps returned to the field after only a one-year hiatus. As a full-fledged Open Class corps, the Bluecoats improved with each passing year, until in 1987, the corps became the first corps from Ohio to earn a place in the DCI World Championship finals, finishing in 11th place. Since then, the corps has failed to make finals only once, in 1999.

In 2010, the corps medaled for the first time at the DCI World Championships, taking the bronze with their production "Metropolis: The Future Is Now". In 2014, they once again took home the silver medal for their show "TILT", which is now cited as one of the most influential shows in the marching arts.

In 2016, the Bluecoats won first place in World Class Finals, becoming only the 10th corps to be DCI champions since the competition began in 1972. The winning show, "Down Side Up", earned the corps' highest score (at the time) of 97.650, while winning the General Effect and Music captions. For 2016, the Bluecoats abandoned their traditional uniforms in favor of a more informal costume designed with the show's near-constant motion in mind; the brass and percussion sections wore white and the color guard wore yellow, both with a swirling, sequined blue accent stripe running from the left hand to the shoulder, across the chest, and down the right leg; Bluecoats also became the first corps to win the DCI title while not wearing any type of headgear. This trend of nontraditional uniforms has continued since then, and has been emulated by numerous other corps since.

At the 2019 DCI World Championships, the Bluecoats came in second place while scoring the corps' highest ever score (at the time) of 98.238. Post-COVID, the activity resumed competitions in 2022, with Bluecoats landing in second place for the third time since 2014. They also attained medalist standing for the sixth time in seven competition years, a feat to which only one other corps can currently attest.

Celebrating its 50th anniversary in 2022, the organization also produced an Alumni Corps that performed at the DCI semifinals.

In 2023, the Bluecoats partnered with EN-RICH-MENT, a local nonprofit youth arts organization, to establish the En-Rich-Ment Fine Arts Academy, a permanent home for free arts education in downtown Canton, Ohio. The initiative aims to provide underserved youth with access to music, dance, visual arts, and theater programming in a dedicated, community-centered space.

In 2024, the Bluecoats announced a two-year musical partnership with Son Lux. The collaboration included the use of three Son Lux titles in the 2024 competitive Drum Corps International season, and new music composed for use in Summer 2025.

Most notably in 2024, Bluecoats won their second DCI World Class Championship title, and finished the season undefeated (18–0) for the first time in the corps' history. The winning show, "Change Is Everything", earned the corps' new highest score (at the time) of 98.750, while winning the General Effect caption and Visual and Brass captions for the first time in the corps' history.

The reigning DCI champions announced their 2025 production "The Observer Effect" on June 28. On July 12, 2025, the Bluecoats premiered 'Endlessly', a brand new musical composition by Son Lux.

In 2026, the Bluecoats won their third DCI World Championship title with their program "Gravity and Grace". They were awarded the Best Color Guard caption for the first time in corps' history, and achieved a new corps' record high score of 99.100, the third highest score in DCI history.

== Show summary (1974–2026) ==
Key
Pale green background indicates DCI World Class Semifinalist (Note: From 1977-1991, the Bluecoats competed in Open Class, from 1992-2007 in Division I, and since 2008 in World Class. These are the same tier, just renamed.)
Pale blue background indicates DCI World Class Finalist
Dark gold background indicates DCI World Class Champion

Year	Repertoire	World Championships	
Year	Repertoire	Score	Placement
1975	Fanfare & Coronation March by Pyotr Ilyich Tchaikovsky / Variations On America by Truman Crawford / Gospel John by Jeffrey Steinberg / Livin' for the City by Stevie Wonder	Did not attend World Championships	
1976	Quejada by Kenneth Snoeck / Drum Fugue by Richard Janes / I Believe by Ervin Drake, Irvin Graham, Jimmy Shirl & Al Stillman / Turkey in the Straw (Traditional) / Theme from Gold by Elmer Bernstein / Theme from S.W.A.T. by Barry De Vorzon / Bridge Over Troubled Water by Paul Simon	Did not attend World Championships	
1977	The Golden Cockerel by Nikolai Rimsky-Korsakov / Porgy and Bess Medley by George Gershwin, DuBose Heyward & Ira Gershwin / Carmina Burana by Carl Orff / Bridge Over Troubled Water by Paul Simon / Fanfare from Quejada by Kenneth Snoeck	65.500	35th Place; Open Class
1978	Farandole by Georges Bizet / Corazón by Carole King / Sweet Inspiration by Dan Penn & Spooner Oldham / Oklahoma Crude by Henry Mancini / Where He Leads Me (Traditional) / Stony End by Laura Nyro / Big Noise from Winnetka by Bob Haggart & Ray Bauduc / New York, New York (from On the Town) by Leonard Bernstein	68.500	28th Place; Open Class
1979	Parade corps only		
1980	Farandole by Georges Bizet / Left Bank Express by Pete Jackson / Encore in Jazz by Vic Firth / Friends by Al Jardine, Brian Wilson, Carl Wilson & Dennis Wilson / Exodus by Ernest Gold	52.050	38th Place; Open Class
1981	Barnum by Cy Coleman & Michael Stewart / Aquarius (from Hair) by Galt MacDermot, James Rado & Gerome Ragni / Encore in Jazz by Vic Firth / Porgy and Bess Medley by George Gershwin & DuBose Heyward	59.600	31st Place; Open Class
1982	Compendium by Ray Crawford / Carnival by Maynard Ferguson & Nick Lane / Aquarius (from Hair) by Galt MacDermot, James Rado & Gerome Ragni / Root Beer Rag by Billy Joel / Pavanne (from American Symphonette No. 2) by Morton Gould	56.250	33rd Place; Open Class
1983	Corps inactive		
1984	Run Back to Mama by Bill Chase & Jim Peterik / Night in Rome by Doc Severinsen & Jeff Tyzik / Bugle Call Rag by Billy Meyers, Jack Pettis & Elmer Schoebel / Magnum Opus by Kerry Livgren, Steve Walsh, Phil Ehart, Rich Williams, Dave Hope & Robbie Steinhardt (Kansas) / For Your Eyes Only by Bill Conti & Mick Leeson	66.600	29th Place; Open Class
1985	Run Back to Mama by Bill Chase & Jim Peterik / Lover Man (Oh, Where Can You Be?) by Jimmy Davis, Ram Ramirez & Jimmy Sherman / Walk Between the Raindrops by Donald Fagen / Sunrise Lady by Bruce Johnstone / Race with the Devil on Spanish Highway by Al Di Meola / One Voice by Barry Manilow	70.200	28th Place; Open Class
1986	Hungarian Dance No. 5 by Johannes Brahms / Doodletown Fifers (Kingdom Coming) / Salt Peanuts by Dizzy Gillespie & Kenny Clarke / Everything Happens to Me by Tom Adair & Matt Dennis	80.300	15th Place; Open Class; Semifinalist
1987	Bye Bye Blues by Fred Hamm, Dave Bennett, Bert Lown & Chauncey Gray / Autumn Leaves by Joseph Kosma & Jacques Prévert, adapted by Johnny Mercer / Body and Soul by Johnny Green, Edward Heyman, Robert Sour & Frank Eyton	85.700	11th Place; Open Class; Finalist
1988	That Old Black Magic by Harold Arlen & Johnny Mercer / Take Five by Paul Desmond / Autumn Leaves by Joseph Kosma & Jacques Prévert, adapted by Johnny Mercer	86.700	11th Place; Open Class; Finalist
1989	Johnny One Note & My Funny Valentine (from Babes in Arms) by Richard Rodgers & Lorenz Hart / Sing, Sing, Sing (With a Swing) by Louis Prima	90.300	8th Place; Open Class; Finalist
1990	Caravan by Juan Tizol / I Got It Bad (and that Ain't Good) by Duke Ellington & Paul Francis Webster / Don't Get Around Much Anymore by Duke Ellington & Bob Russell / It Don't Mean a Thing (If it Ain't Got That Swing) by Duke Ellington & Irving Mills	89.200	8th Place; Open Class; Finalist
1991	Nutville by Horace Silver / Palookaville by Larry Kerchner / A Whiter Shade of Pale by Gary Brooker, Keith Reid & Matthew Fisher	84.400	11th Place; Open Class; Finalist
1992	A Day in the Life; Nowhere Man, Eleanor Rigby, The Long and Winding Road, Penny Lane, A Day in the Life & The End; All by Lennon–McCartney	84.600	11th Place; Division I Finalist
1993	Standards in Blue: A Tribute to Dizzy Gillespie; All The Things You Are (from Very Warm for May) by Jerome Kern & Oscar Hammerstein II / 'Round Midnight by Thelonious Monk / A Night in Tunisia by Dizzy Gillespie & Frank Paparelli	87.200	9th Place; Division I Finalist
1994	Blues; Things Ain't What They Used to Be by Mercer Ellington & Ted Parsons / Blues for Alice by Charlie Parker / In a Sentimental Mood by Duke Ellington / Sandu by Clifford Brown / C Jam Blues by Duke Ellington	84.300	9th Place; Division I Finalist
1995	Homefront: 1945; Come Rain or Come Shine by Harold Arlen & Johnny Mercer / Shippin' Out by Bruce McConnell / I'll Be Seeing You by Sammy Fain & Irving Kahal / Newsreel by Bruce McConnell / Sing, Sing, Sing (With a Swing) by Louis Prima	89.500	7th Place; Division I Finalist
1996	American Celebrations; My Funny Valentine (from Babes in Arms) by Richard Rodgers & Lorenz Hart / Big Day in Bristol by Bruce McConnell / Yankee Doodle Dandy by George M. Cohan / Strike Up The Band by George Gershwin & Ira Gershwin / Prophet's Margin by Bruce McConnell / Have Yourself a Merry Little Christmas by Hugh Martin & Ralph Blane / Auld Lang Syne by Robert Burns	86.300	7th Place; Division I Finalist
1997	Midnight Blue... Jazz After Dark, The Bluecoats' Way; Harlem Nocturne by Earle Hagen & Dick Rogers / Moon by Ennio Morricone / You and the Night and the Music by Arthur Schwartz & Howard Dietz	85.600	11th Place; Division I Finalist
1998	The Four Seasons of Jazz; Winter (Original Music) / It Might As Well Be Spring (from State Fair) by Richard Rodgers & Oscar Hammerstein II / Summertime (from Porgy and Bess) by George Gershwin, DuBose Heyward & Ira Gershwin / Autumn Leaves by Joseph Kosma & Jacques Prévert, adapted by Johnny Mercer	87.100	10th Place; Division I Finalist
1999	Music of Chick Corea; Armando's Rhumba, Duende, Leprechaun's Dream & Celebration Suite; All by Chick Corea	83.000	13th Place; Division I Semifinalist
2000	Threshold; Intro by Doug Thrower / And on the Sixth Day & The Witch by Patrick Williams / Air Antique by Claus Ogerman / Finale by Doug Thrower	84.400	12th Place; Division I Finalist
2001	Latin Sketches; Intro, Candelabra Rhumba, Red Cape Tango & Tango-Finale; All by Michael Daugherty	90.750	8th Place; Division I Finalist
2002	Urban Dances; Sunrise (Original Music) / Paradise Utopia (from Concerto for Bass Trombone) by Chris Brubeck / Reflection (from Dancer in the Dark) by Björk / Pedal to the Metal (from Motor City Triptych) by Michael Daugherty	91.500	7th Place; Division I Finalist
2003	Capture and Escape; Time to Take Back the Knights by Stephen Melillo / Adagio for Theresa by Al Di Meola / Mediterraneo by Giancarlo Bigazzi / Libertango by Astor Piazolla / Code Name: Eternity by Trevor Morris / Original Music by Doug Thrower	90.750	7th Place; Division I Finalist
2004	Mood Swings; Ride by Samuel Hazo / One Day I'll Fly Away (from Moulin Rouge!) by Will Jennings & Joe Sample / Hunting Wabbits by Gordon Goodwin	92.125	6th Place; Division I Finalist
2005	Caravan; Caravan by Juan Tizol / Incantation (from Quidam) by Benoît Jutras / Ombra (from Dralion) by Violaine Corradi / Hajj by Stephen Melillo	94.450	5th Place; Division I Finalist
2006	Connexus; Roots of Coincidence by Pat Metheny & Lyle Mays / Distorted (from La Nouba) by Benoît Jutras / My Heart and I (from La piovra) by Ennio Morricone / The Tihai by Don Ellis	93.175	4th Place; Division I Finalist
2007	Criminal; Criminal by Fiona Apple / Battle Music by David Holsinger / Small World by Trilok Gurtu & Robert Miles / Room Service by Michel Legrand / Smooth Criminal by Michael Jackson / Hummingbird by Steve Bryant / Timbuktu by Aaron Davis & Marc Jordan / Every Breath You Take by Sting	94.050	7th Place; Division I Finalist
2008	The Knockout; On the Waterfront by Leonard Bernstein / The Boxer by Paul Simon / Excerpts from Rocky by Bill Conti / Excerpts from Rocky IV by Vince DiCola / Eye of the Tiger (from Rocky III) by Jim Peterik & Frankie Sullivan	93.175	6th Place; World Class; Finalist
2009	Imagine; Imagine by John Lennon / Children's Hour of Dream by Charles Mingus / Hunting Wabbits 2 by Gordon Goodwin / Sky Blue by Maria Schneider / Haitian Fight Song by Charles Mingus	93.150	6th Place; World Class; Finalist
2010	Metropolis: The Future is Now; 160 BPM (from Angels & Demons) by Hans Zimmer / AHA! by Imogen Heap / Metropolis by Doug Thrower & Tom Rarick / Asphalt Cocktail by John Mackey	96.400	3rd Place; World Class; Finalist
2011	Brave New World; Creep by Thom Yorke, Jonny Greenwood, Colin Greenwood, Ed O'Brien & Phil Selway (Radiohead) and Albert Hammond & Mike Hazlewood / Deus Ex Machina by Michael Daugherty / Harvest: Concerto for Trombone by John Mackey	92.050	7th Place; World Class; Finalist
2012	Unmasqued; Masquerade (from The Phantom of the Opera) by Andrew Lloyd Webber / Filet (from Le Rêve) by Benoît Jutras / Flume by Justin Vernon / Ritual by Doug Thrower & Tom Rarick / Love Dance (from Kà) by René Dupéré / blue cathedral by Jennifer Higdon / Epiphanies (Fanfares and Chorales) by Ron Nelson	92.550	6th Place; World Class; Finalist
2013	...to Look for America; America by Paul Simon / Agnus Dei by Rufus Wainwright / Hallelujah by Leonard Cohen / City Life by Steve Reich / Spring (from The River) by Duke Ellington / Ebony Concerto by Igor Stravinsky / Concerto for Wind Ensemble, Mvt. 5 by Steven Bryant	93.350	5th Place; World Class; Finalist
2014	TILT; Uffe's Woodshop & Platinum Rows by Tyondai Braxton / The Hymn of Acxiom by Vienna Teng / to wALk Or ruN in wEst harlem by Andy Akiho	97.175	2nd Place; World Class; Finalist
2015	Kinetic Noise; Shaker Loops by John Adams & Jon Anderson / Electric Counterpoint by Steve Reich / Woods by Justin Vernon (Bon Iver) / Gene Takes a Drink by Michael Gordon / An Animated Description of Mr. Maps by Nick Zammuto & Paul de Jong (The Books) / Dense by Daniel Denis (Univers Zero)	96.925	3rd Place; World Class; Finalist
2016	Down Side Up; Jose/beFORe JOHN5 by Aurel Hollo / Heat of the Day by Pat Metheny & Lyle Mays / Raga Raja by Greg Pattillo, Eric Stephenson & Peter Seymour (Project Trio) / Udacrep Akubrad by Avner Dorman / Great Gig in the Sky (from The Dark Side of the Moon) by Roger Waters & Clare Torry (Pink Floyd) / Down Slide Up by Doug Thrower / Todo Tiende by Marina Abad, Javier Martin, Sergio Ramos, Xavier Turull & Maxwell Wright (Ojos de Brujo)	97.650	1st Place; World Class; Champion
2017	Jagged Line; Prelude by Mark Radice & Thank You Scientist / Psychopomp by Thank You Scientist / Grow Till Tall by Jónsi / One Study One Summary by John Psathas / Zomby Woof by Frank Zappa	95.163	5th Place; World Class; Finalist
2018	Session 44; Bird & Bela in B Flat by Don Sebesky / American Concerto by Patrick Williams / The Dry Cleaner from Des Moines by Charles Mingus & Joni Mitchell / Saro, as performed by The Westerlies / Home (from Congo Square) by Wynton Marsalis / God Bless the Child by Billie Holiday & Arthur Herzog, Jr.	96.950	3rd Place; World Class; Finalist
2019	The Bluecoats; Revolution 9 by John Lennon, Yoko Ono & George Harrison / Strawberry Fields Forever by John Lennon (as Lennon-McCartney) / Penny Lane & Sgt. Pepper's Lonely Hearts Club Band by Paul McCartney (as Lennon-McCartney) / A Day in the Life by Lennon–McCartney / What Goes On by John Lennon, Paul McCartney & Richard Starkey / "Love Me Do" & I Want to Hold Your Hand by Lennon–McCartney / Yesterday & Eleanor Rigby by Paul McCartney (as Lennon–McCartney) / Within You Without You & Here Comes the Sun by George Harrison / With A Little Help From My Friends by Paul McCartney (as Lennon-McCartney) / Blackbird by Lennon–McCartney / Dear Prudence, Come Together & I Want You (She's So Heavy) by John Lennon (as Lennon–McCartney) / The End & Hey Jude by Paul McCartney (as Lennon-McCartney)	98.238	2nd Place; World Class; Finalist
2020	Season canceled due to the COVID-19 pandemic		
2021	Lucy; The End, With a Little Help from My Friends & Hey Jude by Paul McCartney (as Lennon–McCartney) / 6 by AAESPO / Lucy in the Sky With Diamonds, I Am the Walrus, Being for the Benefit of Mr. Kite, Tomorrow Never Knows, & I Want You (She's So Heavy) by John Lennon (as Lennon-McCartney) / What Happens Now? by Porcupine Tree / Golden Slumbers & Carry That Weight by Paul McCartney (as Lennon-McCartney)	No scored competitions	
2022	Riffs and Revelations; Taming the Dragon & The Garden by Brad Mehldau / Taizo by Henry Hey (Forq) / Nautilus & moonmoons by Anna Meredith / Momento Magico by Youn Sun Nah / Liminality by Dave Hall	97.325	2nd Place; World Class; Finalist (tie) (Note: In 2022, the Bluecoats and the Boston Crusaders tied for 2nd place.)
2023	The Garden of Love; Eleven by yMusic / The Woods by Chick Corea / The Garden of Love by Jacob TV / Finding and Believing by Pat Metheny / 45 by Bon Iver / Bump by Anna Meredith / So Many Layers of Colour Become a Deep Purple Heart by Edda Magnason	97.738	2nd Place; World Class; Finalist
2024	Change Is Everything; Change is Everything by Son Lux / Foreplay/Long Time by Boston / The Four Sections by Steve Reich / Rose by Michael Laurello / Plans We Made by Son Lux / Agape by Nicholas Britell / Love/Lover/Friend by Caroline Rose / Threshold by Sungazer / Dymaxion by Darcy James Argue's Secret Society / Lost It to Trying by Son Lux	98.750	1st Place; World Class; Champion
2025	The Observer Effect; Binary Data IV by Alfonso Peduto / Piano Phase and Drumming by Steve Reich / Dream State by Son Lux / Solitude by M83 / Motto by Dmitry Selipanov / Endlessly by Son Lux	98.250	2nd Place; World Class; Finalist
2026	Gravity & Grace; Familiarity by Punch Brothers / The Wheel Has Come Full Circle by Evgueni Galperine / Don't Look Down by Christopher Cerrone / Ritual Being by Pascal Le Boeuf / fullmoon by Ryuichi Sakamoto / God Only Knows by The Beach Boys / Inhale Exhale by Anna Meredith / Hot Saturn by Sungazer / I've Seen All Good People by Yes	99.100	1st Place; World Class; Champion

== Caption awards ==
At the annual World Championship Finals, Drum Corps International (DCI) presents awards to the corps with the high average scores from prelims, semifinals, and finals in five captions. The Bluecoats have won these captions:

Don Angelica Best General Effect Award

- 2016, 2019, 2024, 2025, 2026

John Brazale Best Visual Performance Award

- 2024, 2025, 2026

Jim Ott Best Brass Performance Award

- 2024

Fred Sanford Best Percussion Performance Award

- 2022, 2026

George Zingali Best Color Guard Award

- 2026

== Traditions ==
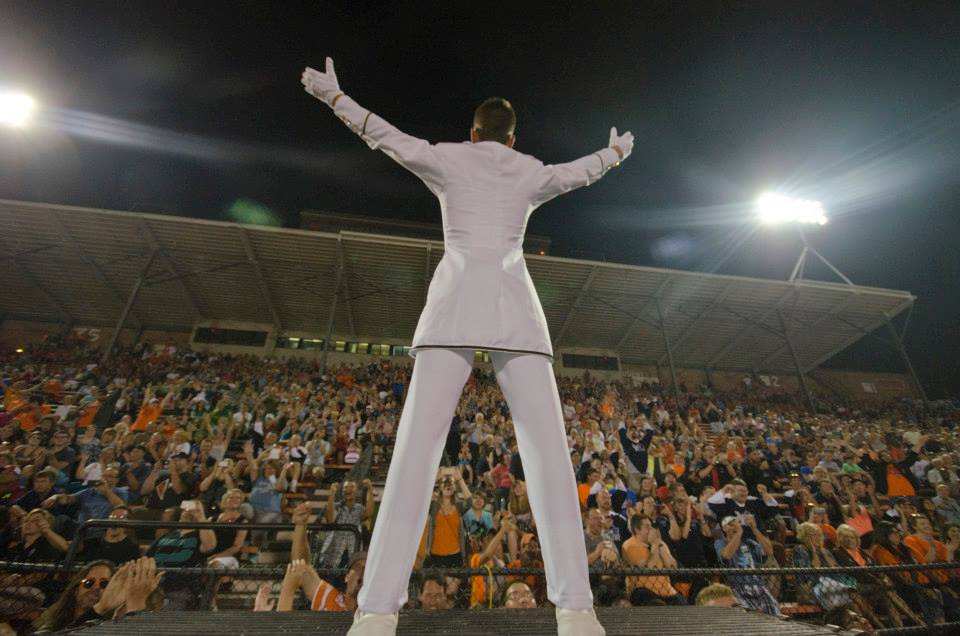
2014 Drum Major Willie Veenstra turns to the crowd during the corps' encore performance.

=== Blooooo... ===
At the Bluecoats first appearance at DCI Finals in 1987, their over-the-top arrangement of the "Autumn Leaves" brought forth the spontaneous long shouts from the audience of "Bloooo..."– a crowd reaction that began with one former member during the 1985 and 1986 seasons and amplified by Drum Corps Midwest announcer Joe Bruno and grew throughout the 1987 season. This has since come to be the audience's traditional greeting as the corps enters the field and response as they finish their show. Drum Corps International ranked the cheer #4 on their list of the most recognizable acts of audience participation in the drum corps activity.

=== Corps song ===
The Bluecoats' corps song is, "Autumn Leaves", which became the corps' song after the 1987 season, in honor of the corps making its first Finals appearance. The song has remained a part of the corps' repertoire since 1987, and it reappeared in their 1988 and 1998 shows.

=== Home show ===
Like most drum corps, the Bluecoats hold an annual home show in their hometown. From the early 1990s through the mid-2010s they operated two shows at different points in the season. The early show cycled over time generally between Massillon, Ohio and the University of Akron, but had been hosted in Parma, Ohio, Kent State University and North Canton Hoover High School. Post COVID the home show has been at Tom Benson Hall of Fame Stadium on the campus of the Pro Football Hall of Fame and attracts around 10,000 spectators as one of the final shows before Championship Week in Indianapolis, Indiana.

In 2019, the corps performed during halftime for the Pro Football Hall of Fame Game.

=== Programs of... ===
In 1982, the Bluecoats started a Class A WGI winterguard titled Bluecoats Pageantry Ensemble (BPE). The group existed for one season under the management of Ted Swaldo, who would go on to be the executive director of Bluecoats after 1983. They finished 9th at the Northeast Regional and 12th at WGI World Championships in Nashville, just missing finals.

In 2000, the Bluecoats initiated and indoor drum line named Rhythm IN BLUE. It did not have any seasons beyond.

In 2009, the corps took over the program of struggling local WGI guard and renamed it Artistry IN BLUE, competing in five seasons between 2010 and 2018 in Independent A class. The group was voted a WGI Fan Favorite in 2016. Artistry finished 6th in 2018, 4th in 2016, 5th in 2015, 4th in 2013, 7th in 2010.

In 2014, Rhythm IN BLUE was initiated as an alumni legacy ensemble with no affiliation other than name with the 2000 drumline program. The ensemble featured between 20 and 50 members annually, performing at one or both of the Bluecoats home shows. In 2016 Rhythm IN BLUE debuted at the SoundSport International Music and Food Festival that accompanies DCI Championship week with a Silver Medal rating. From 2017 to 2019, Rhythm IN BLUE began a secondary movement ensemble in addition to the standing Legacy Arc format at Canton shows, this group average between 12 and 20 performers and attained a Gold rating each time at Indianapolis, Indiana.

In 2018, Bluecoats debuted Bluecoats INDOOR as a World Class WGI guard, finishing 12th in 2018 and 9th in 2019. It did not continue beyond the 2019 season.

In 2023, Bluecoats re-booted Rhythm IN BLUE as a competitive SoundSport ensemble available to anyone 18 and over, where the previous incarnation of Rhythm IN BLUE was a Bluecoats Alumni-centric ensemble. Performing approximately seven times each summer with an ensemble between 40 and 50 members, Rhythm IN BLUE has achieved Gold Medal status, Best of Class and Best of Show at the 2023, 2024 and 2025 SoundSport International Music & Food Festival. The former Rhythm IN BLUE as an alumni-center ensemble was rebranded as Legacy Arc and continues to perform at Bluecoats Opening Weekend of events.
