= Steven Cook =

British artist, photographer and graphic designer

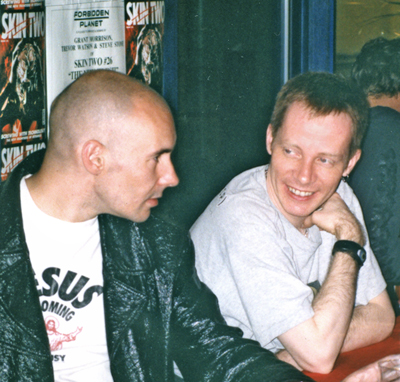
- Steven Cook (right) with Grant Morrison at a signing for their Skin Two magazine collaboration The Story of Zero.
- Areas: Artist, photographer, Graphic Designer
- Notable works: Alternity

Steven Cook is a British artist, photographer, and graphic designer.

Best known for his work in the comics field, Cook was art director and designer for the British comic 2000 AD (1988–2001). During this time he produced a number of striking cover illustrations along with its distinctive, iconic logo still in use to this day. He has also worked for Marvel Comics, Deadline magazine, Manga publishing, DC Comics and Vertigo comics for whom he created the anniversary cover for VERTIGO X, a special edition celebrating ten years of DC's adult-fiction imprint.

His other notable work outside of the comics industry includes three album sleeves for Asian Dub Foundation (Tank, Time Freeze, A History of Now), William Orbit (Strange Cargo III) and Last Man Standing False Starts & Broken Promises, which was selected in September 2008 by Peter Saville and Dylan Jones for the London exhibition 'SPIN – The Art of Record Design'.

More recently, April 2010 saw Warner Bros. using Cook's comic book logo for The Losers film campaign. Steven Cook is a lecturer at the University of the Arts London.

Over the past ten years he has produced a body of work that sees him remixing his own photography and fusing it with imagery from a bygone era. With this series 'Alternity' he creates random scenes from a parallel universe, where the boundaries of time have been compromised and liaisons between the inhabitants of different eras can occur in secret.

Exhibited in New York and London, his first show featured a live performance by writer Grant Morrison, reading a specially crafted monologue to accompany the images, with the musical accompaniment of Ysanne Spevack.

== Biography ==
Cook is an alumnus of the College of Distributive Trades before it became a part of the London College of Communication. He initially worked as a display artist for leading department stores before taking on the role of stylist for Carlton Photographic Studios in London where he realised his passion for photography. This was followed by a stint in a small advertising agency in Surrey as photographer and graphic designer, working on ads and concert programmes for musicians Gary Numan and The Boomtown Rats. During this time he was also moonlighting as a house photographer for a circuit of prestigious restaurants and clubs in Knightsbridge and the West End, being on hand to photograph their celebrity clientele. A chance meeting with British photographer Bruce Fleming gave Cook the opportunity to assist and learn from this respected artist, best known for his classic images of Jimi Hendrix in the 60s.

"Cook was always well ahead of any coming trend, and this Photoshop cover is a classic by him. Long before Bollywood crossed over into the mainstream of British pop culture, Cook pushed to do this cover and the results were stunning. Different from our usual covers, but still 2000 AD."David Bishop 2007 *

In 1983, Marvel UK's Alan McKenzie, who was editor of the long-running Starburst magazine hired Cook as photographer and designer. Cook became art editor in 1985 and completely redesigned the title, giving it a logo that was in use for 24 years. He followed this with a revamp of Doctor Who Magazine and as its new art editor, came to an arrangement with Marvel and Doctor Who's producer John Nathan-Turner to freelance as photographer on set, supplying exclusive images for the magazine.

The next commission from Marvel saw Cook combine his skills as stylist and photographer to produce the cover images for another of their licensed magazines, Hasbro's Sindy. Having previously styled mannequins during his window display period, Cook set about re-defining doll photography by shooting outdoors on-location, thereby pre-empting the "Blythe" series by 14 years. This was followed by a commission from Hasbro themselves to produce a "Cook style" Sindy cover for their 1988 catalogue.

In that same year, Alan McKenzie, who was now working on Fleetway's 2000 AD, recommended Cook as designer for their new-look that was being planned. After submitting a few preliminary ideas he was taken on to completely re-vamp the title giving it the logo that has since become its brand identity. He also assimilated Japanese and Thai typography into the design aesthetic as a precursor to the Manga craze.

In 1988, Fleetway's Steve MacManus commissioned both Cook and Rian Hughes to design a new title that was to be called 50/50. The design duties were split so that they would each design half of the comic, Cook responsible for The New Statesmen and Hughes the Third World War. This title later became known as Crisis and forged a strong alliance between Cook and Hughes who, between them were designing most of the British comics and graphic novels of this period.

As well as the design for New Statesmen, Cook hired fashion designers to style the clothing of the characters in the strip, which was a first for British comics.

During this period 1988 – 89, known as the Second Summer of Love, Cook was also doing editorial shots for Deadline magazine, working for Rhythm King Records and designing for William Orbit and his new label Guerilla Records, for whom he produced a distinctive blue camouflage sleeve influenced by a Thai Air-force shirt that he'd found on his travels in South-East Asia.

1996 saw Cook producing his first digitally manipulated photographs for the covers of Manga Mania magazine. There were concerns by the publishers that his imagery looked more suitable for Skin Two magazine, which became even more evident when Cook was commissioned by Skin Two themselves to produce a cover and fashion feature with his collaborators, Alexander Brattell and Grant Morrison. The subsequent 'Story of Zero' was nominated for an Erotic Oscar in 1999.

Diametrically opposed to this, Cook was back on the dolls again producing elegantly styled and manipulated photographs for Egmont's Barbie Magazine to which he contributed more than 60 covers.

Continuing as art director for 2000 AD until 2001 he consistently updated the look of the title commissioning Rian Hughes to design several exclusive fonts, which alongside Cook's graphic style gave it a unique identity on the newsstands.

Cook also appeared in the 2010 documentary Grant Morrison: Talking with Gods.

== Bibliography ==
=== Comics ===
Comics work includes

==== 2000 AD publications ====
- 2000 AD Cover artist: #600, 637, 647, 649, 662, 667, 722, 772, 843, 1137, 1158, 1571, 1615
- 3000AD Cover artist: 2000 AD Anniversary Supplement (Mar 1997)
- 2000AD Monthly Cover artist: #63
- Judge Dredd Megazine vol.1 No. 12, Megapolitan variant back cover art featuring Sophie Aldred (Sep 1991)

==== Vertigo ====
- Vertigo X: Anniversary Preview Cover Artist: (Apr 2003)

Logo design for:

- Clean Room (2015)
- Effigy (2014)
- Bodies (2014)
- Dead Boy Detectives (2014)
- Coffin Hill (2013)
- Mystery in Space (after Ira Schnapp) (2012)
- Saucer Country (2012)
- The Unexpected (2011)
- Strange Adventures (2011)
- House of Mystery (2008)
- American Virgin (May 2006 – Mar 2008)
- The Dead Boy Detectives (2005)
- Death: At Death's Door (2003)
- Zatanna: Everyday Magic (2003)
- Blood & Water (May – Sep 2003)
- The Losers (Aug 2003 – Mar 2006)
- Deadenders ( Mar 2000 – Jun 2001)

==== DC Comics ====
- Solo #12: "Jelly Night & Jelly Day" (fotofuzz remix, DC Comics, with Brendan McCarthy, October 2006)

Logo design for:

- The Wild Storm (2017)
- DC Rebirth (2016)
- Black Canary (2015)
- Green Arrow (2011)
- Knight and Squire (2010)
- DC Universe: Legacies (2010)
- Red Tornado (2010)
- Superman: Red Son (2003)
- Batman/Judge Dredd: Die Laughing (1998)

==== Marvel Comics ====
- Spider-Man: Fever (digital FX, colours and letters, with Brendan McCarthy, 3-issue mini-series, Marvel Comics, 2010)

=== Music ===
Album covers:

- Asian Dub Foundation, A History of Now (2011)
- Last Man Standing, False Starts & Broken Promises (2008)
- Asian Dub Foundation, Time Freeze: The Best of Asian Dub Foundation (2007)
- Asian Dub Foundation, Tank (2005)
- Torture Garden Records, Extreme Clubbing 4 (2001)
- Torture Garden Records, Extreme Clubbing 3 (2000)
- William Orbit, Strange Cargo III, (design by Orbit & Cook as Paranoia Art Inc), (1993)
- William Orbit, Water From a Vine Leaf, 12" single (1993)
- Guerilla Records, Generic Sleeve (1990)

=== Books ===
Photographic work includes

- Doctor Who: Regeneration Limited edition collectors’ album BBC (2013) 2entertain ASIN B00BWU1ESO
- Cult-Ure – Rian Hughes (2010) Fiell Publishing Limited ISBN 978-1-906863-28-9
- The Boot – Bradley Quinn (2010) Laurence King Publishing ISBN 978-1-85669-663-0
- Script Doctor, The Inside Story of Doctor Who, front cover (2005) Reynolds & Hearn ISBN 1-903111-89-7
- Fetish – Masterpieces of Erotic Fantasy Photography – Carlton Books ISBN 1-85868-674-1
- Device – Art, Commercial – Die Gestalten Verlag ISBN 3-931126-86-2

=== Magazines ===
Photographic work includes

- Doctor Who Magazine: Sylvester McCoy Interview. Cover portrait and feature photography: Issue 425 (Sept 2010) Panini Magazines
- SFX magazine: 186, (Sept 2009) Fifth Dimensional Man. Portrait of Grant Morrison UPC 977135859507409
- SFX magazine – Doctor Who special: 5, Sophie Aldred feature (2006) UPC 977147060102805
- Skin Two magazine: 26, "The Story of Zero" Cover Photo & fashion feature (1998) ISBN 1-899279-55-5
- Manga Mania magazine: 39, Cover Photo (Oct 1996) UPC 977096895701210
- Manga Mania magazine: 38, Cover Photo & fashion feature (Sept 1996) UPC 977096895701209
- Doctor Who Magazine: Cover Photos: Issues 115, 117, 118, 119, 120, 122, 124, 131, 136, 138, 152, 153, 154, 155, 162, 166, Marvel UK
- Sindy: Cover Photos: Issues (Apr 1986) 2 to 44 (Feb 1987) Marvel UK
- Sindy Magazine: Cover Photos: Issues (Aug 1987) 1 to 8 (Mar 1988) Marvel UK
- Le Journal de Barbie: 31, Cover Photo (Jan 1998) Egmont France ISSN 1274-0284
- Le Journal de Barbie: 39, Cover Photo (Sep 1998) Egmont France ISSN 1274-0284
- Barbie Magazine: Issues 13 to 60, Cover Photos (May 1998) Egmont Fleetway
- The Best of Barbie Magazine: Cover Photo (Winter 1998) Egmont Fleetway UPC 9771462733003
- Barbie World Special: Cover Photo (July 1999) Egmont Fleetway UPC 977146273300301
- Barbie Fashion Special: Cover Photo (Nov 1999) Egmont Fleetway UPC 977146273300304
- Barbie Magazine: Issues 62 to 73, Cover Photos (July 2002) Egmont Fleetway

== Exhibitions ==
- Judge Dredd: Visual Arts Centre, Church Square, Scunthorpe, North Lincolnshire. 12 October – 7 December 2013
- Sophie's World: (Solo show) Celebrating the 50th Anniversary of Doctor Who, an exhibition featuring Sophie Aldred (Ace): Orbital Gallery, London. 5 – 30 Sep 2013
- Image Duplicator: Orbital Gallery, London. 16–31 May 2013
- Magick Eye 2: Orbital Gallery, London. 18 October – 18 November 2012
- Secret Origins: (Solo show) The Renoir Cinema, London. 20 July – 17 August 2012
- Stripped!: Orbital Comics Gallery, London. 1 March – 1 April 2012
- The Chosen: finalists of Art Idol 2010: The Red Gallery, London. 11–18 August 2011
- Secret Origins: (Solo show) Orbital Comics Gallery, London. 17 Sep – 17 October 2009
- SPIN – The Art of Record Design: The Arts Gallery, University of the Arts London. 3 Sep – 3 October 2008
- The London Look: Museum of London, portrait of Sweety Kapoor. 29 Oct – 8 May 2005
- Personal Space: Gigantic Art Space G.A.S., Franklin St, New York, NYC. 16 June – 31 July 2004
- Loops & Shadows: J. Walter Thompson Company, Knightsbridge, London. Nov 2003 – Jan 2004
- Cocktail: DELUXE Gallery, Hoxton Square, London. 16 July – 1 August 2003
- Digital DUMBO: Second Annual Digital Arts Festival. D.U.M.B.O. Brooklyn, New York. 20–22 Sep 2002
- fmagazine: Online exhibition in partnership with BT Broadband. 2002
- Alternity: (Solo show) The Colville Place Gallery, London. 10–17 May 2002
- Celebration: Institute of Contemporary Arts (ICA), London. 1999
- Erotic Oscars: The Leydig Trust, London. 1999
- Transitions: The Photographers' Gallery, London. 1993

== Quotes ==
"Old pictures, early photographs, have become fetish objects. They often speak to a time where [sic] repression shared a room with wild decadence, but with hard demarcations. Restrictive, decorative clothing evokes bondage – once known as The English Vice – without ever speaking its name.

Steven Cook's Alternity fetishises the fetish. Careful digital manipulation places these proper ladies and gentlemen in a parallel world; a hyperreal interzone of rubber, piercings and tattoos." Warren Ellis 2002 *

"Steven Cook is an artist who works with digital media and photography. His latest series of work Alternity, manifests possible pasts in mendacious but startlingly believable photographic images. These alternate narratives are strangely familiar, yet have a sense of disquiet as histories collide and memories blur." Roy Voss 2002 *

"Any computer aid can be misused and Photoshop's facilities for manipulation of images have led to some less-than-stunning results, Cook's work is a lesson in how it should be done" Tony Mitchell 1999 Fetish – Masterpieces of Erotic Fantasy Photography

== Notes ==
- Steven Cook at the Comic Book DB (archived from the original)
- Steven Cook at 2000AD online
- Steven Cook at Barney
