= Enemy of the Enemy =

Studio album by Asian Dub Foundation
- Released: 3 February 2003
- Length: 55:07
- Label: Ffrr Records

Asian Dub Foundation chronology
Frontline 1993–1997: Rarities and Remixes (2001)	Enemy of the Enemy (2003)	Live: Keep Bangin' on the Walls (2003)

Professional ratings
Review scores
Source	Rating
Allmusic	2.5/5 stars

Enemy of the Enemy is an album by British band Asian Dub Foundation, released on 3 February 2003. It was the first ADF album to be released following the departure of rapper Deeder Zaman. Following the release of the album, "Fortress Europe" and "Rise to the Challenge" were featured in video games released by Electronic Arts, with the former appearing in Need for Speed: Underground and the latter in FIFA Football 2004.

Track four features Sinéad O'Connor.

== Track listing ==
1. "Fortress Europe" – 3:50
2. "Rise to the Challenge" – 4:25
3. "La Haine" – 3:54
4. "1000 Mirrors" – 4:55
5. "19 Rebellions" – 5:22
6. "Blowback" – 2:56
7. "2 Face" – 5:15
8. "Power to the Small Massive" – 4:23
9. "Dhol Rinse" – 3:18
10. "Basta" – 4:33
11. "Cyberabad" – 5:02
12. "Enemy of the Enemy" – 4:43

== Personnel ==
- Steve Chandra Savale (also known as Chandrasonic) : guitars, programming, vocals, tsura
- John Ashok Pandit (also known as Pandit G) : turntables, samples, vocals
- Sanjay Gulabhai Tailor (also known as Sun J) : effects, mixology, synthesiser
- Aniruddha Das (also known as Dr. Das) : bass, programming, vocals
- Sinéad O'Connor : vocals on "1000 Mirrors"
- Edi Rock (of Racionais MC's) : vocals on "19 Rebellions"
- Ed O'Brien : guitar on "1000 Mirrors", "19 Rebellions" and "Enemy of the Enemy"

== Certifications ==
Region	Certification	Certified units/sales
France (SNEP)	Gold	100,000^{*}
^{*} Sales figures based on certification alone.
