= More Signal More Noise =

The Signal The Noise

Studio album by Asian Dub Foundation
- Released: 31 July 2013
- Genre: Hip hop, electronica, big beat
- Length: 56:26
- Label: Beat Records

Asian Dub Foundation chronology
A History of Now (2011)	The Signal The Noise (2013)	More Signal More Noise (2015)

More Signal More Noise

Studio album by Asian Dub Foundation
- Released: 10 Jul 2015
- Label: ADF Communications/Believe Recordings
- Producer: Louis Beckett / Steve Chandra Savale / Adrian Sherwood

Asian Dub Foundation chronology
The Signal and the Noise (2013)	More Signal More Noise (2015)	More Signal More Noise: The Remixes (2015)

Released in Japan in 2013 as The Signal and the Noise. The album was updated, re-recorded and released internationally in 2015 as More Signal More Noise. These are the eighth and ninth studio albums by the British band Asian Dub Foundation.

== Track listings ==
The Signal and the Noise:

1. "Zig Zag Nation" - 3:49
2. "The Signal And The Noise" - 3:20
3. "Radio Bubblegum" - 4:16
4. "Qutub Minar" - 4:20
5. "Stand Up" - 4:58
6. "Hovering" - 4:52
7. "Straitjacket" - 3:58
8. "Get Lost Bashar" - 3:40
9. "Bnadh Bhenge Dao (ADF Version)" - 3:29
10. "Blade Ragga" - 6:06
11. "Your World Has Gone" - 3:19 (featuring vocals by Shama Rahman)
12. "Dubblegum Flute Flavour" - 5:29
13. "Psychosamba (Bonus Track For Japan)" - 4:43

More Signal More Noise:

No.	Title	Length
1.	"Zig Zag Nation" (K. Romanay, Steve Chandra Savale, Akthar Ahmed)	03:55
2.	"The Signal and the Noise" (Steve Chandra Savale, Akthar Ahmed)	03:22
3.	"Radio Bubblegum" (L. Kenny, Aniruddha Das, Steve Chandra Savale, Loveleen Aulakh)	03:52
4.	"Blade Ragga" (Aniruddha Das, Steve Chandra Savale, Nathan Francis Lee, Loveleen Aulakh)	06:11
5.	"Semira" (Nathan Francis Lee, M. Pagulatos, Steve Chandra Savale, Aniruddha Das)	04:33
6.	"Stand Up" (Steve Chandra Savale, Akthar Ahmed)	04:29
7.	"Flyover (2015)" (Steve Chandra Savale, Sanjay Tailor, Aniruddha Das)	04:19
8.	"Hovering" (Steve Chandra Savale, Aniruddha Das, Nathan Francis Lee, Loveleen Aulakh)	04:48
9.	"Get Lost Bashar" (Aniruddha Das, Steve Chandra Savale)	03:42
10.	"Fall of the House of Cards" (Steve Chandra Savale, Akthar Ahmed, Aniruddha Das, Qaushig Mukherjee, Neel Adhikari)	03:30
11.	"Dubblegum Flute Flavour" (Steve Chandra Savale, Aniruddha Das, Nathan Francis Lee, Loveleen Aulakh)	04:05

== Personnel ==
The following personnel are credited to this album:

- Steve Chandra Savale a.k.a. Chandrasonic - Guitar, vocals, programming, producer
- Aniruddha Das a.k.a. Dr Das - Bass, programming
- Aktar Ahmed - Lead Vocals
- Ghetto Priest - Lead vocals
- Nathan "Flutebox" Lee - Flute, Flute beatboxing
- Rocky Singh - Drums

Additional personnel credited:

- "Zig Zag Nation"; Naga MC - rap; Amy True, Maniman - vocals.
- "The Signal and the Noise"; Chandra Walker - Additional; Prithpal Rajput - Dhol; Daljinder Singh Virdee - Alghoza (twin flutes).

More Signal More Noise (2015) only:

- Qaushig Mukherjee and Neel Adhikari (Gandu Circus) - Vocals on "Fall of the House of Cards".
- Tanaji Dasgupta, Damini Roy, Kamalika Banarjee - Adicional vocals on "Fall of the House of Cards".
- Suomo - Khol (percussion) on "Fall of the House of Cards".

== Reception ==
Louder Than War gave the More Signal More Noise a very positive review calling it "... possibly their finest album yet." and stating it is "Loud, proud and jam-packed full of superbly arranged and produced tracks ...". NME rated the album as mediocre, they praised its "audacious" sonics but said some of the lyrics covered "cringe song topics".
