= Rebel Warrior =

1995 song by Asian Dub Foundation

Single by Asian Dub Foundation

from the album Facts and Fictions
- B-side: "Strong Culture"
- Released: April 17, 1995
- Genre: Drum and bass
- Length: 6:23
- Label: Nation
- Songwriters: Steve Chandra Savale, Aniruddha Das, Pandit G
- Producer: Asian Dub Foundation

The song "Rebel Warrior" appeared on British musical group Asian Dub Foundation's 1995 debut album, Facts and Fictions, and also on the group's fourth album, Community Music, under a slightly different arrangement. The song was inspired by the poem Bidrohi, translated from Bengali as "The Rebel", and written by Kazi Nazrul during the 1920s.

Kazi Nazrul was a Bengali poet, patriot and composer during the end of the colonial era in India who supported Indian unity. Nazrul wrote Bidrohi as a call to arms for those who were oppressed in India by the British and a call for unity between Muslims and Hindus. The poem politically and metaphorically called for Indians to oppose British colonialism, by physically taking the government back and by mentally removing the imitation of British ideals and ideas from the country and returning to more traditional ways. His poem was the first aggressive poem published against colonialism and it was immediately successful and popular with both Muslims and Hindus. In his quest to unify India, Nazrul attempted to make Hindus and Muslims overlook their internal issues with each other and instead fight against the British. Kazi Nazrul went on to write more poems, as well as the first Bengali protest music, though he was later arrested for his outspoken beliefs, becoming one of the most important men in the Indian independence movement.

Asian Dub Foundation roughly translated the original text of Bidrohi on their track "Rebel Warrior" and used the song to support a modern take on Nazrul's original stance. The poem was chosen in part because of its significance to the Indian independence movement and because of its place in Indian traditional culture and its powerful and unifying lyrics. It speaks out against neo-colonialism, both in England and South Asia, while also expanding the message to oppose modern racism in post-colonial England and the Western world in general.

The lyrics, mostly taken from the original poem, encourage anger and resistance against the hegemonic West and call for people to stand up against racism by actively fighting the oppressor, even to the point of ending the Western empire. This parallels Nazrul's original message, in which he challenged people to stand up and battle colonialism by fighting back. The song also says that part of ending racism is ending divisions between cultures, using the metaphor of the siren and flute and saying that these divisions exist only in the mind.
