= Satpal Ram =

British man

Satpal Ram is a British man of South Asian descent who was charged and convicted of murdering Clarke Pearce in Birmingham, England during a fight in 1986. His case has drawn some controversy due to alleged mistreatment by the courts and the British prison system due to his racial background.

== Background ==
According to Satpal Ram, he and two friends visited a restaurant in November 1986. While there, an altercation broke out among Ram and his two friends and another group of six people also in the restaurant, in what has been described as a racially motivated attack. The argument, which was initially over Asian music being played on the restaurant's radio system, became a physical fight. Ram said that he stabbed one of the party of six, Clarke Pearce, in self-defence after Pearce attacked him with a broken bottle. Pearce was taken to hospital with knife wounds and later died. Consequently, Satpal Ram was arrested for murder and convicted in 1987.

== Controversy ==
Later debate and controversy arose among the British media when it was alleged that his barrister did not meet with him and only saw him for about forty minutes before the trial. The jury was claimed to have also missed vital evidence because no interpreter was provided to translate for a Bengali-speaking waiter who had been present at the incident. It is also alleged that the judge was to have said he would interpret but also that he couldn't speak the Bengali language. Musicians including Bobby Gillespie of Primal Scream, and Asian Dub Foundation, who released a single entitled "Free Satpal Ram" to bring attention to his case, have championed Ram's cause.

Reports of Ram being beaten, starved, repeatedly strip-searched, and made to spend large periods of time in solitary confinement also arose, resulting in accusations of racism within the criminal justice system.

== Release ==
Satpal Ram was released from Blantyre House Prison on parole in June 2002. His initial release, as recommended by the parole board in 2000, was overturned by the Labour Home Secretary at the time, Jack Straw. His release in 2002 resulted from a European Court of Human Rights ruling which stated that government executives such as the Home Secretary had no right to overrule a decision of a parole board.
