= Minority Large =

Studio album by Deeder Zaman
- Released: 28 January 2008
- Genre: Dub; electronic; hip hop; reggae
- Length: 51:02 (digital download edition); 60:00 (Japan edition)
- Language: English
- Label: Simple Tings; Beat
- Producer: Deeder Zaman

Deeder Zaman chronology
Minority Large (2008)	Pride of the Underdog (2011)

Minority Large is the debut studio album by English rapper Deeder Zaman, released on 28 January 2008 by Beat Records.

== Composition and release ==
Deeder Zaman took on the roles of writer, programmer, vocalist, guitarist and keyboardist on Minority Large. The album features dub, hip-hop, electronica and reggae. It was released as a CD in Japan and on iTunes.

== Critical response ==
Mat Ward of Green Left Weekly said, "Zaman's debut solo album, Minority Large, switched his musical focus from Asia to Africa." Sreekanth of EthnoTechno said, "Seventeen tracks is an awful lot of time to keep someone's attention but somehow under Deeder Zaman's guidance, it does not seem long enough."

== Track listing ==
No.	Title	Length
1.	"Minority Large"	4:42
2.	"That's The Way It Is"	4:01
3.	"Bobo Sec"	4:03
4.	"Nah Go Stoosh"	2:55
5.	"Fire Within"	3:44
6.	"Peanut Butter"	2:56
7.	"Brewing Storm"	1:36
8.	"Two Rocks"	4:05
9.	"Jam On Toast"	3:07
10.	"Keep Right"	1:44
11.	"Young Blood"	4:01
12.	"Shenai"	4:01
13.	"Stereotypes"	3:00
14.	"Whirlwind"	3:11
15.	"Barcelona"	3:36
Total length:		51:01

Japan edition
No.	Title	Length
16.	"Two Rocks" (Adrian Sherwood Mix)	4:08
17.	"Tidal Wave"	4:49
Total length:		60:00

== Personnel ==
Musicians and vocals

- Dennis Rootical – bass
- Deeder Zaman – guitar, keyboards, melodica, percussion
- Louis Beckett – guitar, piano
- Clotaire K – oud
- P. Brooke – ukulele

Vocals

- Deeder Zaman
- Passion

Technical

- Deeder Zaman – mix engineer (tracks 1 to 17)
- Louis Beckett – mix engineer (tracks 2 to 17)
- Brendan Lynch – mix engineer (track 1)
- Al Scott – mastering engineer
