= Aqualung =

Aqualung may refer to:

== Diving-related ==
- Aqua-Lung, a generic name used in the past to refer to a scuba diving regulator, particularly the original double-hose models
- Aqualung Group, a French manufacturer of diving equipment
- Aqualung America, a US subsidiary of the French company

== Music ==
- Aqualung (musician) or Matt Hales (born 1972), British musician, or his eponymous 2002 album
- Aqualung (album), 1971, or its 2005 live album Aqualung Live, by Jethro Tull
- "Aqualung" (song), a 1971 song by Jethro Tull
- "Aqualung", a song by Spooky from the album Gargantuan (album), 1993
- "Aqualung", a song by Morcheeba from Charango (album), 2002
- "Aqualung", a song by Miss Li from the album A Woman's Guide to Survival, 2017

== See also ==
- Aquahung, a former name for the Bronx River in New York
- Dryptosaurus aquilunguis, a dinosaur
