= Facts and Fictions =

1995 drum and bass album by Asian Dub Foundation

Studio album by Asian Dub Foundation
- Released: January 1995
- Genre: Reggae; drum and bass
- Length: 1:09:24
- Label: Nation, Virgin France
- Producer: Dr Das, Chandrasonic

Asian Dub Foundation chronology
Facts and Fictions (1995)	R.A.F.I. (1997)

Professional ratings
Review scores
Source	Rating
AllMusic	3/5 stars
Pitchfork Media	6.4/10
The Rolling Stone Album Guide	3.5/5 stars

Facts and Fictions is the debut album by the British band Asian Dub Foundation, released in 1995 on the Nation Records label. It was later re-released on Virgin France (2000) and Beggars Banquet Records (2002).

== Track listing ==
1. "Witness" (Chandrasonic, Aniruddha Das, Pandit G, Steve Chandra Savale, Sun-J, Delbert Tailor, Thorpe, Zaman) – 4:50
2. "PKNB" (Chandrasonic, Aniruddha Das, Pandit G, Steve Chandra Savale) – 6:27
3. "Jericho" (Chandrasonic, Aniruddha Das, Pandit G, Steve Chandra Savale) – 7:02
4. "Rebel Warrior" (Chandrasonic, Aniruddha Das, Pandit G, Steve Chandra Savale) – 6:27
5. "Journey" (Chandrasonic, Aniruddha Das, Pandit G, Steve Chandra Savale, Zaman) – 7:06
6. "Strong Culture" (Chandrasonic, Aniruddha Das, Steve Chandra Savale, Uddin, Zaman) – 6:44
7. "TH9" (Chandrasonic, Aniruddha Das, Pandit G, Steve Chandra Savale, Thorpe, Zaman) – 5:25
8. "Tu Meri" (Chandrasonic, Aniruddha Das, Pandit G, Steve Chandra Savale, Thorpe) – 4:57
9. "Debris" (Chandrasonic, Aniruddha Das, Pandit G, Steve Chandra Savale, Zaman) – 4:18
10. "Box" (Chandrasonic, Aniruddha Das, Pandit G, Steve Chandra Savale, Zaman) – 6:09
11. "Thacid 9 (Dub Version)" (Chandrasonic, Aniruddha Das, Pandit G, Steve Chandra Savale) – 5:32
12. "Return to Jericho (Dub Version)" (Chandrasonic, Aniruddha Das, Pandit G, Steve Chandra Savale) – 4:26

== Personnel ==
The following personnel are credited to this album:

- Master D - Rap
- Bubbly - dancer
- Catalysa - slides
- Chandrasonic - guitar, programming, voices, producer
- Dr Das - programming, bass, voice
- Pandit G - turntables
- Sun-J - sequencing
- Mr Maiquez - live mix
- Frederic Voisin - artwork, design
