= Community Music =

Community Music may refer to:

- Community Music (company), an Australian music distribution and artist services business
- Community Music (album), a 2000 studio album by Asian Dub Foundation
