= CWAC =

CWAC may refer to:

- Canadian Women's Army Corps was a non-combatant branch of the Canadian Army for women
- Children with AIDS Charity is a UK charity to help children affected by HIV/AIDS
- Cheshire West and Chester Council is a unitary authority in the North West of England
