= Tony Thorpe (disambiguation) =

Tony Thorpe (born 1974) is an English footballer.

Tony Thorpe may also refer to:

- Tony Thorpe (musician) (1945–2026), English guitarist and singer; member of The Rubettes
- Tony Thorpe (record producer) and artist of The Moody Boys
