= The Furys (new wave band) =

American band

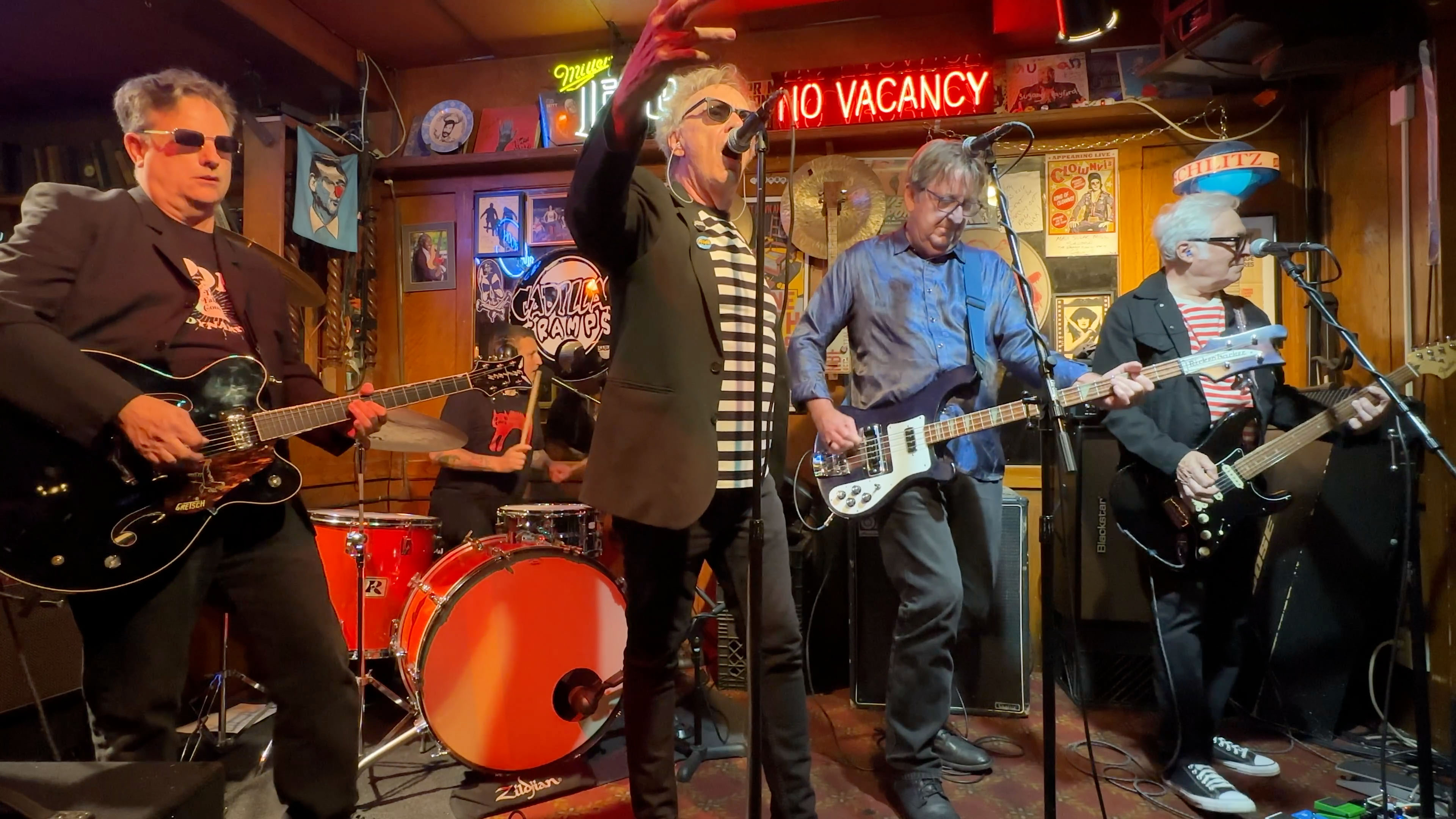
- The Furys at the Maui Sugar Mill Saloon, on July 3, 2026

Background information
- Origin: Los Angeles, California
- Genres: Rock, punk rock, new wave, power pop
- Years active: 1977–present
- Labels: Arcane Alley Records; Beat Records; EMI America Records; Arcane Alley Records
- Members: Jeff Wolfe (Vocals); Cliff Roman (Guitar); John DiMambro (Guitar); Dave Lewty (Bass); Paolo Dell'Olio (Drums)
- Past members: Jeff Jourard (Guitar); Dave Lewty (Bass)* Gregg Embrey 1977-1988 (Bass, Piano, Guitar, Vocals); Doug Martin 1977-1979 (bass); Chaz Maley 1977-1979 (guitar); Joe Conti 1978-1979 (piano); Gary Embrey 1978-1983 (drums); Bob Beland (guitar) (1980s) (performed live and on the Indoor/Outdoor mini-LP); Mark Francis White (drums)(1980s and mid-2000s) (performed live and on the Indoor/Outdoor mini-LP and on the tracks Wicked White and Tear it Down); Richard d’Andrea (while not a permanent member, played bass on Indoor/Outdoor); Glen Laughlin (bass mid-1980s; guitar mid-2000s) (performed live and produced, recorded and played guitar on Wicked White and Tear it Down); Robert Lane (bass mid-2000s) (performed live and on Wicked White and Tear it Down); Chris Silagyi (Guitar); Kelly Fair (Drums)
- Website: https://thefurysband.com

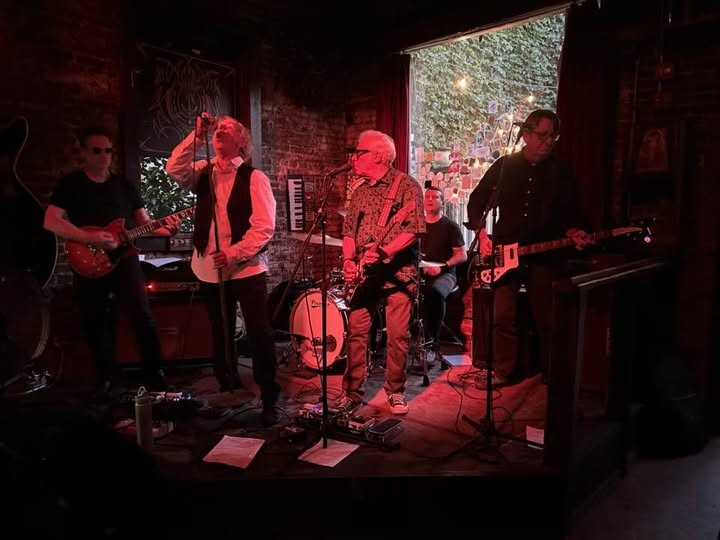

The Furys are a veteran Los Angeles rock band that started as icons of the early New Wave and Punk Scene in Orange County and Los Angeles—releasing their recordings independently on Double R Records and Beat Records label, they were mainstays of the early scene, and still active today.

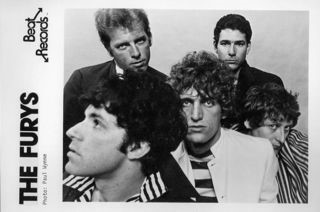
The Furys Beat Records Promotional Postcard

== Formation 1976-1977 ==
The band began in 1976 when Orange County schoolmates Jeff Wolfe and Gregg Embrey decided to take matters into their own hands and start a band that rocked back to their roots of rockabilly, British mods, and California surf music. Jeff and Gregg started writing their material and produced their first recordings and single.

Since there were few indie music outlets, they started their label Double R Records with manager Michael Compton (aka Jett) and blazed a trail with an indie release of their first single, Hey Ma, backed by Jim Stark Dark, released in 1977.

The band lineups on the single were for “Hey Ma” with Gregg Embrey, piano, vocal; Gary Embrey, drums; Harold Hayes, bass; Wayne Harter, guitar, and on “Jim Stark Dark” the lineup was Gregg Embrey, piano, vocal; Gary Embrey, drums; Chaz Maley, guitar; Doug Martin, bass.

In 1977, The Furys’ “Jim Stark Dark” lineup started taking gigs wherever possible and with a rocking punk style, starting with their debut at the Surf Theater in Huntington Beach.

== 1978 ==
1978 saw more success as they released their second single, Say Goodbye to the Black Sheep, backed by Suburbia, Suburbia, self-released on Double R Records. This record took off with substantial airplay on the burgeoning college/underground radio market. KROQ and their DJs, like Rodney Bingenheimer, championed and played “Black Sheep” extensively.

The lineup of Jeff Wolfe-vocals, Gregg Embrey, bass; Gary Embrey, drums; Chaz Maley, guitar; Joe Conti, keyboards built on their growing following and saw them play extensively in a growing network of New Wave and Scene Clubs, playing in Los Angeles, Orange County, Riverside, Long Beach, and San Diego.

This year also saw The Furys’ first performance at Whisky a Go Go, appearing with The Last” and “The Tremors”.

The Furys were at the forefront of this live music renaissance, not only playing established venues such as the Whisky, Troubadour, Starwood, and other Hollywood locales, but they also started playing underground (quasi-legal) events at the Skeleton Club, Lawn Rehearsal Studio, and other “pop up” gigs packed with The Furys fans.

In October ’78, The Furys were asked by local promoter Paul Greenstein if the band would play at a new venue he was launching, a restaurant in the heart of Los Angeles’ Chinatown. The band agreed to the gig and thus was the first rock n roll band to play the legendary Madame Wong's. That first night was a rousing success, thus ensuring a decade-long entertainment empire for Wong’s. During this year, The Furys appeared with many other famous local bands: The Weirdos, The Zeros, The Last, The Alleycats, The Know, and many more. Popular rock act The Plimsouls saw their first gigs as an opening act for The Furys.

During this time, the band also performed as an opening act for major touring acts, including British bands such as Magazine, 999, and Ultravox, along with dates with New York Dolls singer David Johansen, Iggy Pop, and many more.

== 1979 ==
1979 saw The Furys release a third single, released by Beat Records, Moving Target/We Talk We Dance. During this time, the band continued its busy gigging schedule, making numerous appearances at the Cuckoo's Nest in Orange County, the Nugget a Go Go in Long Beach, and Hollywood venues such as Gazzarris and the Whisky. Packed houses became de rigueur. Press coverage—both mainstream and underground—continued to grow.

== 1983 ==
With a growing fanbase centered north of their Orange County origins, the band needed to change its home base and move up to Los Angeles. The move led to a lineup change of switching in Marty Korth, bass; Bob Beland, guitar, with Gregg Embrey moving to guitar and Jeff Wolfe continuing vocals; the drum seat was in rotation at this time as they continued to grow as a live act and critical part of the New Wave and Punk scene.

== 1985-1987 ==
As they continued gigging across southern California, the lineups underwent some changes; in 1985, The Furys consisted of Jeff Wolfe, vocal; Gregg Embrey, guitar; Michael Dempsey, bass; Bob Beland, guitar; and MB Gordy, drums. In 1986, they switched in Richard D'Andrea, bass, and Francis White, drums, later Marty Korth rotate in on bass and vocals.

In 1986 The Furys recorded their mini-LP Indoor/Outdoor at EMI-America Studio in Hollywood. Radio play on the record expanded outside the California home base and was far-reaching. The growing college/indie radio networks had picked up on The Furys.

In 1987, the lineup made one last change for the century, adding Glen Laughlin, bass, and Francis White, drums. In 1987, the band decided they had run their current course and hung it until 2012, when they reformed.

== 2012-2015 ==
Interest in The Furys began anew in 2012 when radio play and fan interaction began to surface. Jeff Wolfe reformed the group, and they began to gig and play southern California dates. The band during this time consisted of Jeff Wolfe, Glen Laughlin, guitar, Bobby Lane, bass, and Francis White, drums. In 2014, the lineup shifted with Chris Silagyi on guitar and Kelly Fair on drums.

== 2022-2025 ==
2022 saw the fruit of the Wolfe/Lewty writing partnership, and they recorded and released an album of new material, The Furys Again, with Dave playing all of the instruments on the tracks. With the sales, streaming, and radio response to the album, Jeff and Dave have set about putting together a live band and plans for a new recording.

The lineup in during this period includes Jeff and Dave, Cliff Roman (Weirdos), Jeff Jourard (Motels), and Ray Herron (Sloths). The group produces a massive sound. The Furys New Wave Hit Parade was released in August 2023, chronicling the group’s three vinyl singles in the 70s, the “Indoor/Outdoor” mini album from 1986, and a bonus track, The Sun Ain’t Gonna Shine Anymore, recorded with Brian Wilson's string section in 2016. 2024 saw the band play extensively around Los Angeles with gigs at Cinema Bar, Sardine Bar, Vaquero Y Mar, Alex's Bar (as part of the Shaky Town Strut festival), The Redwood Bar & Grill and Maui Sugar Mill Saloon.

October 4, 2024, The Furys released a new single "Everybody's New / "Without You" on Arcane Alley Records with a new album soon to follow.

On April 24, 2025 saw the release of Hey Girl, Goodbye, a song with "Heartland hooks meet jangle-pop grit— where Petty swagger crashes into Gin Blossoms shimmer." The song and accompanying music video received a large international response topping charts on indie radio and being featured on Little Steven's Underground Garage.

August 1, 2025 saw the release of Without You (Single Mix), "Shimmering riffs, propulsive drums, and melodic lift-off—‘Without You’ is a powerpop heartbreak you can dance to". The song got great traction and saw top charting across indie streaming radio along with great traction of the music video in social channels.

== 2026- ==
The new year saw a new lineup with the additions of John DiMambro on Guitar and Vocals, a former member of 1990s punk rock band Down by Law, he has also toured with Agent Orange and played with Jane Wiedlin. Also joining and taking the drum seat is Paolo Dell'Olio, on Drums and Vocals, Paolo has toured extensively in North America and Europe with bands such as Threats, Stay Wild, Lords Of Death, La Crisi, and The New Story.

The current lineup of Jeff Wolfe on Vocals, Dave Lewty on Bass and Vocals, Cliff Roman on Guitar and Vocals, John DiMambro on Guitars and Vocals and Paolo Dell'Olio are playing live around Los Angeles.

The new year and new lineup saw a new single, Sweet Connection with accompanying music video released featuring the new band. The song received immediate traction across indie streaming radio, including #1 in Los Angeles, Sweet Connection was also picked up and featured on Little Steven's Coolest Songs of the World.

== Discography ==
=== Album ===
- New Wave Hit Parade (Arcane Alley Records/2023)
- Again (self-released/2021)
- The Sound of the Furys (self-released/2016)

=== EP ===
- Indoor/Outdoor 12" 45 (King Coitus/1986)

=== Singles ===
- "Hey Ma" / "Jim Stark Dark" (Double R/1977)
- "Say Goodbye To The Blacksheep" / "Suburbia Suburbia" (Double R/1978)
- "Moving Target" / "We Walk, We Dance" (Beat/1979)
- "New Wave Girl / (Arcane Alley Records/2021)
- "Action/Reaction" / (Arcane Alley Records/2021)
- "Glitter Bomb" / (Arcane Alley Records/2021)
- "Everybody's New / "Without You" (Arcane Alley Records/2024)
- "Hey Girl, Goodbye" (Arcane Alley Records/2025)
- "Without You" (Arcane Alley Records/2025)
- "Your Eyes" / (Arcane Alley Records/2025)
- "Sweet Connection" (Arcane Alley Records/2026)

=== Compilation appearances ===
- L.A. In: A Collection Of Los Angeles Rock And New wave Bands (Rhino/1979) - "Say Goodbye To The Blacksheep"
- We're Desperate: The L.A. Scene (1967-79) (Rhino/1979) - "Say Goodbye To The Blacksheep"
- Metrojet: Volume Two (Red Rubber Ball/2002) - "Moving Target"
