= Random Roads Collection =

Studio album by Project Trio
- Released: 2012
- Genre: Classical
- Label: Tummy Touch Records
- Producer: Project Trio and Harmonyville Records

Random Roads Collection is a compilation album released in 2012 by Project Trio. The album was released under Tummy Touch Records.

== Track listing ==
1. Interlude:Slidy
2. Dr. Nick
3. Fables Of Faubus
4. Cherry Blossoms
5. Semuta
6. Visual Machine
7. Dup Dup
8. Interlude: 2nd Happiest Song In The World
9. Winter In June
10. My House
11. Grass
12. Random Roads Suite II-Adagio
13. Sweet Pea
14. Three Movie Scenes
15. Teenie
16. Arco:Pizz
