= Conscious Party (Asian Dub Foundation album) =

Live album by Asian Dub Foundation
- Released: 1998
- Recorded: UK
- Genre: Jungle, breakbeat, rap, world

Asian Dub Foundation chronology
Rafi's Revenge (1998)	Conscious Party (1998)	Community Music (2000)

Professional ratings
Review scores
Source	Rating
Allmusic	1.5/5 stars

Conscious Party is an album by Asian Dub Foundation, released in 1998. The album features live cuts of tracks from Rafi's Revenge, as well as several remixes and the tracks "Tribute to John Stevens" and "Digital Underclass", both of which originally appeared on Rafi's Revenge (the latter as a bonus track on some versions only).

== Track listing ==
All tracks by Asian Dub Foundation

1. "Assassin" (5:37) (Live)
2. "Black White" (3:47) (Live)
3. "Naxalite" (5:24) (Live)
4. "Taa Deem" (5:23) (Live)
5. "Dub Mentality" (4:53) (Live)
6. "Hypocrite" (4:19) (Live)
7. "Buzzing" (5:25) (Live)
8. "Charge" (4:13) (Live)
9. "Free Satpal Ram" (5:17) (Live)
10. "Tribute to John Stevens" (5:15)
11. "Free Satpal Ram" (5:24) (ADF Sound System Remix)
12. "Charge" (5:03) (ADF Sound System Remix)
13. "Digital Underclass" (5:24)
14. "Culture Move" (4:35) (ADF vs. MC Navigator Disco Plate)

== Personnel ==
- Louis Beckett – Remixing, Mixing
- Filthy Rich – Mixing
- Bobby Marshall – Remixing
