= Frontline 1993–1997: Rarities and Remixes =

Frontline 1993-1997: rarities and remixes

Compilation album by Asian Dub Foundation
- Released: November 2001
- Length: 59:42
- Label: Beggars UK - Ada

Asian Dub Foundation chronology
Community Music (2000)	Frontline 1993-1997: rarities and remixes (2001)	Enemy of the Enemy (2003)

Frontline 1993–1997: Rarities and Remixes is a compilation album by the British electronica band Asian Dub Foundation. It was released in 2001, and contains tracks recorded between 1993 and 1997.

== Track listing ==
1. "Witness (DJ Scud remix)"
2. "Change a Gonna Come"
3. "Strong Culture (Juttla & Charged mix)"
4. "Change a Gonna Come (Panicstepper remix)"
5. "Rivers of Dub"
6. "Tu Meri (Wayward Soul remix)"
7. "Nazrul Dub"
8. "Jericho (Capa D dub)"
9. "P.K.N.B. (Dry & Heavy Connection dub)"
10. "C.A.G.E. (via pirate satellite)"
11. "Operation Eagle Lie"
