= Project Trio =

- Origin: Brooklyn, New York, United States
- Genres: Chamber
- Years active: 2005–present
- Members: Greg Pattillo (flute, beatboxing, flute beatboxing); Daniel Berkey (tenor saxophone); Peter Seymour (double bass)
- Past members: Eric Stephenson (cello)
- Website: www.projecttrio.com

PROJECT Trio is a chamber music ensemble based in Brooklyn, New York. It consists of Greg Pattillo (flute), Daniel Berkey (Tenor Saxophone), and Peter Seymour (double bass), with Eric Stephenson (cello) as their former member. Their extensive repertoire consists of original compositions and arrangements by the trio members that highlight their versatility by bridging several styles including classical music, jazz, hip hop, rock, Americana, and bluegrass. They have arranged pieces by Charles Mingus, Dave Brubeck, Tchaikovsky, Beethoven, Bach, Jethro Tull, Duke Ellington, Thelonious Monk, and Guns N' Roses. The group also is dedicated to music education and has formed a nonprofit organization that offers workshops and concerts in schools around the world. With over 70,000,000 combined views on YouTube and over 70,000 subscribers on their YouTube channel, freedomworksfilms, Project Trio is one of the most viewed chamber music ensembles on the internet.

== History ==
PROJECT Trio consists of Greg Pattillo (flute), Daniel Berkey (tenor saxophone), Peter Seymour (double bass), and former member, Eric Stephenson (cello). The—original, with Eric Stephenson—three met in 1996 while students at the Cleveland Institute of Music.

While members of the Colorado Music Festival, Seymour and Stephenson conceived the idea to start a classical chamber music group that would incorporate elements of the jazz and rock world and provide a different experience than the typical classical concert-going experience. Their original idea was to come together two or three times a year in a city around the country and do a week-long music infusion with concert and education/outreach activities in and around the city. They approached Pattillo to round out the group and in the spring of 2005, the three gathered in Cleveland to put on a concert, perform in multiple schools and offer music workshops for youth.

In February 2007, Pattillo put a video on YouTube that received instant viral success and garnered him wide attention for his unique style of mixing beatbox with flute. The video has since received over 26,000,000 views. The success of the video led Seymour, who had been playing as a sub for the Cleveland Orchestra, to move to New York City to join Pattillo and Stephenson. In May 2007, the three wrote their first album, Winter in June, which was recorded in Pittsburgh, after which they went on their first tour to Boulder, Detroit and Dallas.

PROJECT Trio has since performed in concert halls, clubs and classrooms around the world, including the Kennedy Center, Brooklyn Academy of Music, SXSW and Carnegie Hall. They have toured Hong Kong, Australia, Europe, Canada, and over 35 states in the U.S.

They have also released two other self-produced albums under their record label Harmonyville Records: Brooklyn (2009) and the critically acclaimed Project Trio (2010).

PROJECT Trio continues to be active in music education. They have performed at school assemblies, conducted workshops and master classes for over 50,000 students around the world. Their workshops have included improvisation for classical musicians and rhythm workshops that use elements of Dalcroze Eurythmics.

As of 2012, Project Trio are signed onto Tummy Touch Records. They have released one album under Tummy Touch Records entitled "Random Roads Collection."

On January 17, 2013, they performed at New Providence High School, in New Providence, New Jersey

== Members ==
- Greg Pattillo — flute
- Daniel Berkey — tenor saxophone
- Peter Seymour — double bass
- Eric Stephenson (former member) — cello

== Discography ==
- Winter in June (2007)
- Brooklyn (2009)
- Project Trio (2010)
- When Will Then Be Now (2012)
- Random Roads Collection (2012)
- Instrumental (2014)
- Sixth Floor Live (2019)
