= Spooky (DJs) =

British electronic music production and DJ duo

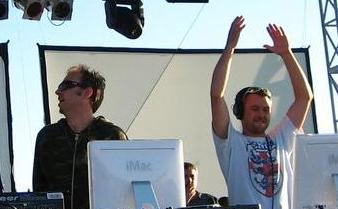
- Spooky in 2006. Left to right: Duncan Forbes, Charlie May

Background information
- Origin: Manchester, England
- Genres: Progressive house; electronic
- Years active: 1990–present
- Members: Charlie May; Duncan Forbes
- Website: Spooky on Bandcamp

Spooky are a British electronic music production and DJ duo consisting of Duncan Forbes and Charlie May.

== History ==
They debuted with Gargantuan in 1993 after signing to Guerilla Records. In 1995 and 1996, they released three EPs (Clank, Stereo and Shunt) on their own Generic Records label, followed quickly in mid-1996 by their second album, Found Sound. Two singles from this album were released: "Fingerbobs" and "Bamboo".

Charlie May collaborated with Sasha on his 1999 Xpander EP and 2000's "Scorchio", and in 2002 he co-produced some tracks on Sasha's Airdrawndagger album. The same year saw the release of "Belong", the first Spooky single on Deviant Records, which Sasha later used on his mix album Involver. A white label single, "Andromeda", was released in 2003

A single entitled "Strange Addiction" was given a limited release in 2005 on Spooky's new self-owned label, spooky.uk.com. "Strange Addiction" featured in a trailer for The Great Global Warming Swindle which broadcast on British television channel Channel 4 in March. This was followed in September 2006 with the release of No Return as a download and promotional CD. Spooky later bought back the rights to their entire back catalogue from the five record companies that previously owned their music, which had all gone out of business.

== Discography ==
=== Albums ===
- Gargantuan (1993)
- Found Sound (1996)
- Open (2007)

=== Singles/EPs ===
- "Don't Panic" (1992)
- "Land of Oz" (1992)
- "Little Bullet" (1992)
- "Persuasion" (with Billie Ray Martin) (1993)
- "Schmoo" (1993)
- Clank EP (1995)
- Stereo EP (1995)
- Shunt EP (1996)
- "Fingerbobs" (1996)
- "Bamboo" (1996)
- "Belong" (2002)
- "Andromeda" (2003)
- "Strange Addiction" (2005)
- "No Return" (2006)
- "New Light" (2007)
- "Shelter" (2007)
- "Little Bullet Re-works" (2019)
- Nebua EP (2019)
- "Bells of Fury" (2020)
