= Community Music (album) =

Studio album by Asian Dub Foundation
- Released: 20 March 2000
- Length: 69:57
- Label: FFRR; London
- Producer: Asian Dub Foundation; Louis Beckett; Bobby Marshall

Asian Dub Foundation chronology
Conscious Party (1998)	Community Music (2000)	Frontline 1993–1997: Rarities and Remixes (2001)

Singles from Community Music
- 1. "Real Great Britain" Released: 2000; 2. "New Way, New Life" Released: 2000

Community Music is a 2000 studio album by Asian Dub Foundation. It peaked at number 20 on the UK Albums Chart. It features vocal contributions from Benjamin Zephaniah, Ambalavaner Sivanandan, Nusrat Fateh Ali Khan, and Assata Shakur.

== Critical reception ==
Professional ratings
Review scores
Source	Rating
AllMusic	4.5/5 stars
NME	10/10
Pitchfork	8.7/10
Q	4/5 stars
The Rolling Stone Album Guide	3.5/5 stars
Select	4/5

Chris Grimshaw of AllMusic commented that "Community Music should be in every thinking person's collection, directly between the Clash and Public Enemy." Nick Mirov of Pitchfork wrote, "Community Music is incredibly ambitious, and amazingly, it delivers everything it promises and then some."

NME listed it as the 39th best album of 2000.

== Track listing ==
All tracks are written by Das, Pandit, Savale, Tailor, Zaman, except where noted.

No.	Title	Length
1.	"Real Great Britain"	3:13
2.	"Memory War"	3:35
3.	"Officer XX"	3:20
4.	"New Way, New Life"	5:01
5.	"Riddim I Like" (Das, Pandit, Savale, Tailor, Zaman, Benjamin Zephaniah)	4:27
6.	"Collective Mode"	3:52
7.	"Crash"	5:24
8.	"Colour Line"	4:01
9.	"Taa Deem" (Nusrat Fateh Ali Khan)	4:46
10.	"The Judgement"	4:14
11.	"Truth Hides"	8:21
12.	"Rebel Warrior" (Das, Pandit, Savale)	6:23
13.	"Committed to Life" (Das, Pandit, Savale, Tailor, Zaman, P. Andrade, A. Shakur)	4:44
14.	"Scaling New Heights"	8:26

French edition (type A) bonus track
No.	Title	Length
15.	"Collective Mode (featuring Leeroy from Saïan Supa Crew)"	3:52

French edition (type B) bonus track
No.	Title	Length
15.	"Sawt L'hekma (featuring Clotaire K)"	3:58

Japanese edition bonus track
No.	Title	Length
15.	"Community Music"	3:59

== Personnel ==
Credits adapted from liner notes.

Asian Dub Foundation

- Deedar – vocals, programming
- Chandrasonic – vocals, guitar, programming
- Dr. Das – vocals, bass guitar, programming
- Pandit G – vocals, sampler, turntables
- Sun-J – synthesizer, effects

Additional musicians

- Paul Chivers – percussion (3)
- Catalisa – vocals (4, 11)
- Johnny Kalsi – percussion (4, 7, 10)
- Benjamin Zephaniah – vocals (5)
- Helen MacDonald – vocals (6)
- Louis Beckett – keyboards (6)
- Ambalavaner Sivanandan – vocals (8)
- Sangeeta Sharma – vocals (8)
- Nusrat Fateh Ali Khan – vocals (9)
- Louis Beckett – guitar (10)
- Assata Shakur – vocals (13)

Horn section on "Real Great Britain" and "New Way, New Life"

- Duncan Mackay – trumpet
- Nichol Thomson – trombone
- Jim Hunt – saxophone

== Charts ==
Chart	Peak position
French Albums (SNEP)	34
Norwegian Albums (VG-lista)	8
UK Albums (OCC)	20
