= Gargantuan (album) =

Studio album by Spooky
- Released: March 1993
- Studio: Boundary Row Studios, South London; Guerilla Studios, North London
- Genre: Progressive house
- Length: 66:24
- Label: Guerilla Records
- Producer: Spooky

Spooky chronology
Gargantuan (1993)	Found Sounds (1996)

Gargantuan is the debut studio album by English electronic duo Spooky, released by William Orbit's Guerilla Records in March 1993. Having established their place at the forefront of the progressive house scene, Spooky recorded the album in two London studios using analogue production. The record is largely instrumental and incorporates rigid percussion and rhythms with melodic house phrasings. The single "Schmoo" reached the UK Singles Chart, but Gargantuan under-performed commercially. It was however well received by critics, and today is regarded as a landmark album in the history of progressive house and British dance music. After the album went out-of-print, Spooky re-released it themselves in 2006.

== Background and composition ==
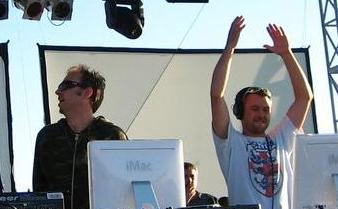
Spooky (pictured 2006) recorded Gargantuan during their time as progressive house producers.

Spooky, a duo consisting of Duncan Forbes and Charlie May, formed in London. After William Orbit discovered the duo in a record shop, he signed them to his Guerilla record label in the early 1990s. While on the label, the duo became renowned for being at the forefront of the progressive house scene that emerged in the aftermath of the "post-rave comedown", joining fellow acts like Orbital and Underworld in re-casting house music in an energetic live environment. Their debut album, Gargantuan was recorded at Boundary Row Studios in South London and Guerilla Studios in North London. May engineered the sessions with Nick Hale, while May and Forbes produced and mixed the album together.

Biographer Sean Cooper describes Gargantuan as a progressive house album that fuses "deep, melodic house phrasing" and rigid rhythms with thick analogue production. The record is largely instrumental, and characterised by inventive "electronic layers" and pulsing grooves, with a melodic and percussive emphasis. Rubert Howe of Select described the album as "trancey" in style, and believed the record was perhaps "for relaxation purposes." The dark "Aqualung" features "dripping, cavernous echoes". A tribute to the producer Paul Oakenfold, "Land of Oz" features a sample of the band Can. The closing track "Orange Colour Liquid" features an ambient style. Heather Sian Wildman and Valerie Harrison provide vocals on the album, while Laura Lee MacMahon's voice appears on "Aqualung".

== Release and reception ==
Professional ratings
Review scores
Source	Rating
AllMusic	4.5/5 stars
Record Collector	4/5 stars
Select	3/5 stars

Garganutan was released in March 1993. Although released on Guerilla in the United Kingdom, it was issued by I.R.S. Records in the United States. In Italy, the album was released by Underground Music Movement. "Schmoo" was released as a single and spent a week in the UK Singles Chart, reaching number 72 in March, but the album itself did not chart on the UK Albums Chart. Nonetheless, Garganutan was well received by critics. Rubert Howe of Select called the album "state-of-the-art prog-house" that contrasted with the "dubious prog-rock implications" of the album title. While noting the instrumental nature of the music, he felt the music was dark, but not as much as the "brainstorms brewed up by their continental contemporaries." At the end of 1993, Melody Maker ranked it at number 40 in their list of the best albums of the year.

Spooky became one of Guerilla's most successful artists, and Resident Advisor writes that the duo remain best known for Gargantuan and its singles "Schmoo" and "Little Bullet". The record went on to become regarded as one of the first "complete albums" in British dance music, and as an enduring progressive house classic. Guerilla nonetheless went bankrupt shortly after the album's release, and the record gained in value and stature while it remained out-of-print. The duo were able to secure the rights for the album and re-released it by themselves in 2006 on CD and download.

In a retrospective review, Jon Bush of AllMusic named Gargantuan an "Album Pick" and cited it alongside Leftfield's Leftism (1995) as one of the landmark albums in the resurgence of British house music in the 1990s. He noted the album's "epic singles" being compiled alongside "excellent new material" like "Little Bullet," and although he felt several of the tracks were "a bit predictable", the duo's "melodic sense and percussive edge rarely misfire." In a review of the reissue, Kris Needs of Record Collector described the album as a "UK dance music landmark", and wrote that the album's "magical creations" remained fresh-sounding. While complimenting the "imaginative electronic layers" and pulsating grooves, he also highlighted a "heady, pre-digital innocence and joy at play in this album, which is refreshing to encounter anywhere you like." Gareth Grundy of Select reflected that the album was "excellent."

== Track listing ==
All songs written by Charlie May and Duncan Forbes, except "Don't Panic", written by May and Forbes with Richard Dight and Richard Tappin.

1. "Don't Panic" – 7:02
2. "Schmoo" – 5:37
3. "Aqualung" – 5:42
4. "Little Bullet Part One" – 6:57
5. "Little Bullet Part Two" – 6:27
6. "Land of Oz" – 7:36
7. "Something's Got to Give" – 6:52
8. "Orange Coloured Liquid" – 5:09
9. "Schmoodub" – 7:32
10. "Let Go" – 7:26

== Personnel ==
- Charlie May – engineer, writing, producing, mixing
- Duncan Forbes – writing, producing, mixing
- Nick Hale – engineer
- Heather Sian Wildman – vocals (tracks 2 and 9)
- Valerie Harrison – vocals (tracks 4, 5 and 7)
- Laure Lee MacMahon – voice (track 3)
- Richard Dight – writing (track 1)
- Richard Tappin – writing (track 1)
