= Pride of the Underdog =

Studio album by Deeder Zaman
- Released: 31 October 2011
- Genre: Electronic; hip hop; reggae
- Length: 53:08
- Language: English
- Label: Modulor
- Producer: Adrian Sherwood; Deeder Zaman; Devon White; Trevor Boucard

Deeder Zaman chronology
Minority Large (2008)	Pride of the Underdog (2011)

Singles from Pride of the Underdog
- 1. "Us & Us" Released: 25 October 2011

Pride of the Underdog is the second studio album by English rapper Deeder Zaman, released on 31 October 2011 by Modulor.

== Critical response ==
Mat Ward of Green Left Weekly described Pride of the Underdog as "...warm, wide bass and shuffling sounds from speaker to speaker like shifting sands. Its reversed snares seem to slip through your cranium as they surreally slide from ear to ear."

== Track listing ==
No.	Title	Length
1.	"Delgado Riddim"	2:39
2.	"Baby I Love You So"	4:11
3.	"Trixta"	4:44
4.	"Want to Know"	3:13
5.	"Brothers and Sisters"	4:17
6.	"Roots Man"	4:38
7.	"Jesus"	3:34
8.	"Humble"	3:16
9.	"1 Call"	6:47
10.	"Us & Us"	4:17
11.	"Baby I Love You So" (Jungle Mix)	4:25
12.	"Us & Us" (Alcuacil Dubkilla HI-FI Mix)	3:45
13.	"Baby I Love You So" (Acappella)	3:24
Total length:		53:08

== Personnel ==
Musicians

- Deeder Zaman – bass guitar, melodica
- Devon White – guitar
- Skip McDonald – guitar
- Alok Verma – percussion, tabla

Vocals

- Deeder Zaman
- Devon White
- Ghetto Priest
- Elaine Cheng

Technical

- Vinod Gadher – executive producer
- Adrian Sherwood – mix engineer
