= R.A.F.I. =

Studio album by Asian Dub Foundation
- Released: 1997
- Length: 58:04

Asian Dub Foundation chronology
Facts and Fictions (1995)	R.A.F.I. (1997)	Rafi's Revenge (1998)

Professional ratings
Review scores
Source	Rating
Allmusic	3/5 stars

R.A.F.I. is a 1997 album by British electronica band Asian Dub Foundation. Initially released only in France, most of the tracks were re-recorded and issued on Rafi's Revenge in 1998.

== Track listing ==
1. "Assassin"
2. "Change"
3. "Black White"
4. "Buzzing"
5. "Free Satpal Ram"
6. "Modern Apprentice"
7. "Operation Eagle Lie"
8. "Hypocrite"
9. "Naxalite"
10. "Loot"
11. "Dub Mentality"
12. "Culture Move"
13. "Real Areas for Investigation"
