= Deeder Zaman =

Bangladeshi-British rapper (born 1978)

- Also known as: Deeder Zaman
- Born: Saidullah Zaman; 25 July 1978 (age 48); London, England
- Genres: Alternative hip hop; jungle; reggae fusion; dub
- Occupation: Rapper
- Instruments: Vocals; percussion; bass; electric guitar
- Years active: 1993–present
- Labels: Simple Tings; Beat; Modulor; United Sound Records
- Member of: Asian Dub Foundation; Rebel Uprising
- Website: deederzaman.com

Saidullah "Deeder" Zaman (Bengali: সাঈদউল্লাহ দিদার জামান; Hindi: सईदउल्लाह दीदार जमान; born 25 July 1978) is a Bangladeshi-British rapper and former lead vocalist for British band Asian Dub Foundation.

== Early life ==
Zaman got involved with music when he was six years old and used to breakdance. He was nine years old when he first started making music and performed his first live performance at age 11. He used to perform with his sister, Parul. He was also a member of Joi Bangla. Zaman grew up on reggae and hip hop music, and got into jungle in his teens.

Zaman's father is a homoeopathic doctor, and his elder brother, Saifullah "Sam" Zaman (1965–2015, also known as State of Bengal), was a DJ and music producer. In 1987, Zaman became an original member of his brother's State of Bengal group, which included MC Mustaq. Zaman attended Stratford School.

== Career ==
At the age of 14, Zaman joined Community Music, a London-based educational organisation that focuses on collective music making, at Community Music House in Farringdon, where bassist Dr Das (Aniruddha Das) taught music technology and civil rights worker DJ John Pandit (Pandit G) helped him out as a youth worker. Zaman attended workshops teaching youths the basics of music technology. In late 1993, the three formed Asian Dub Foundation as a sound system to play at anti-racist gigs. The following year, they recruited guitarist Chandrasonic and evolved into a band. The final member, Sun-J, joined in 1995. Zaman was the lead vocalist for Asian Dub Foundation and was known as Master D.

In December 2000, he left the band after being inspired by activist work while recording the Asian Dub Foundation song "Free Satpal Ram" about Satpal Ram, a young man who was convicted of murder in what he claimed was self-defense against a racist attack. Zaman then devoted his energies to civil rights and anti-racism organisations. He has worked for the National Civil Rights Movement, the Campaign Against Racism and Fascism, the Miscarriages of Justice Organisation and the Children with AIDS Charity.

In 2002, Zaman formed Rebel Uprising with multi-instrumentalist Passion and bassist Dennis Rootical from Iration Steppas. In January 2008, Zaman's debut solo album, Minority Large, was released by Beat Records. In October 2011, his second solo album, Pride of the Underdog, was released by Modulor.

Zaman contributed to the soundtracks of the 1999 film Brokedown Palace and the 2006 film The Namesake.

Zaman's music features hip hop, reggae and ragas. When he was in Asian Dub Foundation, the genres featured were also punk or jungle punk, but his music is now roots-based with early reggae and nyabinghi influences. He plays percussion, bass, and guitar. His musical influences include Nusrat Fateh Ali Khan, Lata Mangeshkar, Mohammed Rafi, Public Enemy, Tony Rebel, and Paban Das Baul.

== Discography ==
=== Albums ===
Title	Album details	Chart positions	Certifications
Minority Large	Released: 28 January 2008; Label: Beat Records; Formats: CD, Digital Download		
Pride of the Underdog	Released: 31 October 2011; Label: Modulor; Formats: CD, Digital Download		

== See also ==
- Asian Underground
- British Bangladeshis
- List of British Bangladeshis
