= Live: Keep Bangin' on the Walls =

Live album by Asian Dub Foundation
- Released: December 2003
- Length: 1:11:50
- Label: Rise It Out

Asian Dub Foundation chronology
Enemy of the Enemy (2003)	Live: Keep Bangin' on the Walls (2003)	Tank (2005)

Live: Keep Bangin' on the Walls is an album by British band Asian Dub Foundation, released on 3 December 2003.

== Track listing ==
1. "Cyberabad"
2. "Charge"
3. "Blowback"
4. "2 Face"
5. "Fortress Europe"
6. "Riddim I Like"
7. "New Way New Life"
8. "Rise to the Challenge"
9. "Assatta Dub"
10. "Enemy of the Enemy"
11. "La Haine"
12. "Naxalite"
13. "Free Satpal Ram"
14. "Dhol Rinse"
15. "Rebel Warrior"
