= Time Freeze: The Best of Asian Dub Foundation =

Time Freeze 1995/2007: The Best of Asian Dub Foundation

Greatest hits album by Asian Dub Foundation
- Released: 5 March 2007
- Length: 1:01:47
- Label: EMI

Asian Dub Foundation chronology
| Tank (2005) | Time Freeze 1995/2007: The Best of Asian Dub Foundation (2007) | Punkara (2008) |

Time Freeze 1995/2007: The Best of Asian Dub Foundation is a compilation album by the Asian Dub Foundation, released in March 2007 on the EMI label.

== Track listing ==
1. "Rebel Warrior"
2. "Box" (Andy Kershaw BBC Radio 1 Session 1996)
3. "Jericho" (Andy Kershaw BBC Radio 1 Session 1996)
4. "TH9"
5. "Naxalite (Main Mix)"
6. "Black White"
7. "Change"
8. "Free Satpal Ram"
9. "Buzzin'"
10. "Real Great Britain"
11. "Collective Mode"
12. "New Way New Life"
13. "Fortress Europe"
14. "1000 Mirrors"
15. "Flyover"
16. "Stop Start" (New Song)
17. "Target Practice" (New Song)

=== Limited Edition Disc 2 ===
1. "Debris"
2. "Culture Move (Pusher Sound Mix)"
3. "Memory War"
4. "Siberian Slengteng"
5. "Black Steel in the Hour of Chaos"
6. "Son of a Bush"
7. "Modern Apprentice"
8. "Free Satpal Ram (Russel Simmins Remix)"
9. "Fortress Europe (Jazzwad Remix)"
10. "Journey"
11. "Oil"
12. "Hope (Congo Natty Remix)"
13. "Rafi"
14. "Roundup (Sun J Remix)"
15. "Activists & Selectors"
