= HM Prison Blantyre House =

Former men's prison in Kent, England

HMP Blantyre House
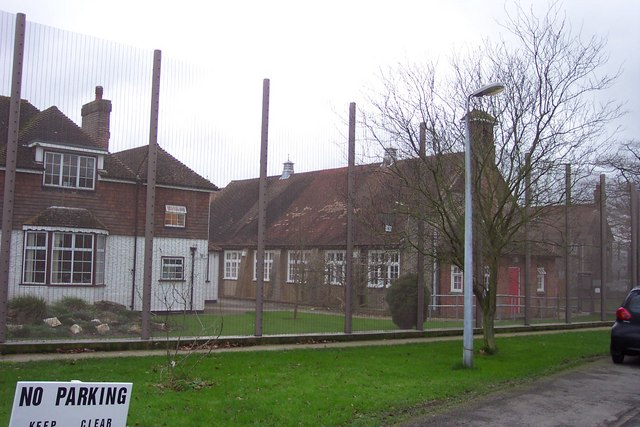
- HMP Blantyre House

- Location in Kent
- Location: Goudhurst, Kent; 51.1341°N 0.5041°E
- Security class: Adult Male/Category C&D
- Capacity: 122
- Opened: 1954
- Closed: 2016
- Managed by: HM Prison Services
- Governor: James Bourke
- Website: Blantyre House at justice.gov.uk

HM Prison Blantyre House was a Category C/D resettlement prison for men, located on the outskirts of Goudhurst in Kent, England. The prison was operated by Her Majesty's Prison Service until it closed in January 2016 for refurbishment work. As of 2018 the prison still remains closed, but the Ministry of Justice have stated the prison is still available to use and may have a future as a training facility.

== History ==
Originally a country house, the Prison Service converted the building into a Young Offenders Institution in 1954. The prison was then re-classified as an adult prison in 1991. Blantyre House courted controversy in 1996 after an ex-inmate accused the prison regime of corruption. This followed an incident that resulted in the death of a woman when two prisoners caused a multiple-vehicle traffic accident during a 100 mph chase while out on day release.

In 2000 a large raid (named Operation Swinford) at Blantyre House caused controversy among the press and politicians. Prison authorities claimed the raid was needed to expose potential deep-rooted corruption at the prison. The Prison Service claimed that investigations stretched back to the original allegations in 1996, and involved Kenneth Noye allegedly placing a prisoner at Blantyre House as part of a fraud plot. The following year Blantyre House was singled out as having the best community relations of any prison in the UK along with one of the lowest re-offending rates.

The management at Blantyre House was amalgamated with HMP East Sutton Park in 2007. In the same year the Home Office announced plans to expand the prison by building a new block which could double capacity at Blantyre House when built.

== The prison today ==
Prisoners tend to have already served three years or more in other prisons and are transferred to Blantyre House to complete the last part (maximum three years) of their sentence. Because of this the prison's main focus is the re-integration and re-settlement of prisoners into the community and preparation for life after prison. Education is compulsory for the first six months of the inmate's stay at the prison, and prisoners who wish to continue their education are allowed attending external colleges to study as part of their resettlement plan. Prisoners are also able to find full-time paid work outside of the prison 12 months before their release.

The prison closed in January 2016. There are no confirmed plans regarding what to do with the buildings

Suggestions have been made about the site opening again as a training facility.

== Notable former inmates ==
- Erwin James, convicted murderer who spent the last few years of his sentence at Blantyre House
- Satpal Ram, convicted murderer whose case caused controversy after allegations racism by the courts and prison service. Ram was released from Blantyre House in 2002
- Winston Silcott, member of the Tottenham Three was held at Blantyre House for a time after a murder conviction until his release in 2003
