= Punkara =

Studio album by Asian Dub Foundation
- Released: 2008
- Label: Naïve Records

Asian Dub Foundation chronology
Time Freeze: The Best of Asian Dub Foundation (2007)	Punkara (2008)	A History of Now (2011)

Professional ratings
Review scores
Source	Rating
World of Music	4/5 stars
AllMusic	3.5/5 stars

Punkara is the sixth studio album by the collective Asian Dub Foundation. It was recorded with The Go! Team producer, Gareth Parton at The Fortress Studios, London. It is the first album released with new singer Al Rumjen formerly of King Prawn. There was an advanced release in Japan on 26 March 2008, and it was subsequently leaked worldwide. Punkara was released in the UK on the 13 October 2008 with a different track listing to the Japanese release which featured an exclusive bonus track. A video has been released for Burning Fence, the song appears in the video game Need for Speed: Undercover

== Track listing ==
Japan release
No.	Title	Length
1.	"Superpower"	4:54
2.	"Burning Fence"	4:12
3.	"No Fun"	4:17
4.	"Speed of Light"	6:15
5.	"Ease Up Caesar"	3:58
6.	"S.O.C.A."	4:40
7.	"Target Practice"	3:33
8.	"Living Under the Radar (ghostplane)"	4:16
9.	"Altered Statesmen"	4:18
10.	"Bride of Punkara"	5:01
11.	"Stop the Bleeding"	3:31
12.	"Awake/Asleep" (Bonus Track)	4:05

UK release
No.	Title	Length
1.	"Target Practice"	3:33
2.	"Burning Fence"	4:14
3.	"Superpower"	4:54
4.	"Speed of Light"	6:15
5.	"Ease Up Caesar"	3:58
6.	"Living Under the Radar"	4:16
7.	"S.O.C.A."	4:40
8.	"Altered Statesmen"	4:18
9.	"Bride of Punkara"	5:01
10.	"Stop the Bleeding"	3:31
11.	"No Fun"	4:17
12.	"S.O.C.A. (Eugene Hütz vocal version)" (Bonus Track)	4:40
13.	"Burning Fence (Solidays live version)" (Bonus Track)	4:24
14.	"Flyover (Solidays live version)" (Bonus Track)	5:05

== Critical reception ==
AllMusic was generally positive about the album but noted it broke little new ground.
