= Winston Silcott =

English man whose conviction for murder was overturned

Winston Silcott (born 1959), a British citizen born to Caribbean (Montserrat) parents, was wrongfully convicted in March 1987, as one of the "Tottenham Three", for the murder of PC Keith Blakelock on the night of 6 October 1985 during the Broadwater Farm riot in north London – despite not having been near the scene. The convictions of all three individuals were quashed on 25 November 1991 after scientific tests suggested the men's confessions had been fabricated.

Silcott received compensation of £17,000 for his wrongful conviction. Two of the investigating police officers were prosecuted for fabricating evidence but were acquitted in 1994. Silcott received a further £50,000 in compensation from the Metropolitan Police in an out-of-court settlement which ended a civil action against the force for malicious prosecution.

Silcott was convicted in 1979 and sent to prison for six months for his part in a nightclub brawl. In 1979 he was tried for and acquitted of murder.

In 1989, the London School of Economics Students' Union elected Silcott as Honorary President, as a protest against miscarriages of justice.

Silcott served 18 years' imprisonment for the murder of boxer and nightclub bouncer Tony Smith, for which he was on bail when Blakelock was killed. Silcott claimed that he killed Smith in self-defence after an altercation in which he feared for his life and felt he had no choice but to attack, but was disbelieved by the jury. He was released from Blantyre House Prison in October 2003. Silcott had also served a six-month prison sentence for assault in a nightclub prior to his conviction for the murder of Smith.

In 2005, the police recruited Silcott to run a youth centre on the Broadwater Farm Estate, in a bid to reduce youth crime in the area.

In 2004, and 2012, there were reports that Silcott had been arrested for alleged retail theft, neither arrest appears to have led to a prosecution.
