= Rafi's Revenge =

Studio album by Asian Dub Foundation
- Released: 11 May 1998
- Recorded: 1997
- Studio: The Roundhouse Studios
- Genre: Jungle; breakbeat; Bhangra
- Length: 48:55
- Label: FFRR; London
- Producer: Asian Dub Foundation; Rex Sargeant; Brendan Lynch; Primal Scream

Asian Dub Foundation chronology
R.A.F.I. (1997)	Rafi's Revenge (1998)	Conscious Party (1998)

Singles from Rafi's Revenge
- 1. "Naxalite" Released: 1997; 2. "Free Satpal Ram" Released: January 1998; 3. "Buzzin'" Released: May 1998; 4. "Black White" Released: 1998

Rafi's Revenge is a 1998 studio album by Asian Dub Foundation. It peaked at number 20 on the UK Albums Chart. It was shortlisted for the 1998 Mercury Music Prize.

== Critical reception ==
Professional ratings
Review scores
Source	Rating
AllMusic	4/5 stars
Entertainment Weekly	B+
The Guardian	4/5 stars
Los Angeles Times	2/4 stars
Mojo	4/5 stars
Muzik	6/10
NME	7/10
Pitchfork	9.4/10
Rolling Stone	4/5 stars
The Rolling Stone Album Guide	3.5/5 stars

Rick Anderson of AllMusic called Rafi's Revenge "an exhausting but exhilarating album," adding that "its depth and complexity of texture keep revealing new surprises with repeated listenings." Matt Diehl of Entertainment Weekly wrote, "Recalling the Clash in their dance-music phase or a more groovealicious Rage Against the Machine, Asian Dub Foundation kick out the jams in Rafi's Revenge with aplomb; in the process, they become more than a caustic Cornershop for club kids."

== Track listing ==
All tracks are written by Das, Pandit, Savale, Tailor, Zaman, except where noted

No.	Title	Length
1.	"Naxalite"	4:42
2.	"Buzzin'"	4:29
3.	"Black White"	3:34
4.	"Assassin"	4:01
5.	"Hypocrite"	4:00
6.	"Charge"	3:37
7.	"Free Satpal Ram"	3:44
8.	"Dub Mentality" (Das, Pandit, Savale, Tailor, Zaman, Spacek)	4:27
9.	"Culture Move" (Das, Pandit, Savale, Tailor, Zaman, Crawford)	4:30
10.	"Operation Eagle Lie"	3:21
11.	"Change"	3:08
12.	"Tribute to John Stevens"	5:14
Total length:		48:55

US edition bonus tracks
No.	Title	Length
13.	"R.A.F.I."	3:29
14.	"Digital Underclass"	4:49

Australian edition bonus tracks
No.	Title	Length
13.	"Free Satpal Ram (Russell Simmins Remix)"	5:44
14.	"Culture Move (Pusher Sound Mix)" (Das, Pandit, Savale, Tailor, Zaman, Crawford)	7:36
15.	"Charge (Live Version)"	3:39
16.	"Naxalite (Live Version)"	5:04

== Personnel ==
Credits adapted from liner notes.

Asian Dub Foundation

- Deeder – vocals, programming
- Chandrasonic – vocals, guitar, programming
- Dr Das – vocals, bass guitar, programming
- Pandit G – sampler, turntables
- Sun-J – synthesizer, MIDI

Additional musicians

- Navigator – vocals (9)
- Catalisa – vocals (3, 5)
- Ysanne – violin (8)

== Charts ==
Chart	Peak position
Norwegian Albums (VG-lista)	30
UK Albums (OCC)	20
