= The Moody Boys =

British record production and remix outfit

The Moody Boys / Moody Boyz
- Origin: UK
- Genres: House, techno, drum and bass, dubstep
- Years active: 1988–present
- Labels: XL Recordings, Guerilla, SSR
- Members: Tony Thorpe
- Past members: Jimmy Cauty [according to some sources; probably a collaborator]
- Website: www.themoodyboyz.com

The Moody Boys or Moody Boyz is Tony Thorpe's UK-based record production and remix outfit, active since 1988.

The Moody Boys were closely linked with the KLF - and in particular with KLF member Jimmy Cauty - until the KLF's retirement in 1992, but it is not known whether Cauty was ever officially a member of the Moody Boys or merely a close collaborator.

== History ==
According to AllMusic, "Moody Boyz" is the "nom de plume of producer Tony Thorpe (both solo and with occasional collaborators)".

Beginning in 1988 with the single "Acid Rappin'", the Moody Boys produced dance music that incorporated elements of techno, dub, acid house, hip hop, drum and bass and African music. Their 1991 single "Funky Zulu" is considered a house classic. The Moody Boys' original releases were complemented by duties as the "in-house" remixers of the KLF's hit singles "3 a.m. Eternal", "What Time Is Love?" and "Last Train to Trancentral". In each case, The Moody Boys' mixes were released on separate 12"s to the charting singles, in 1990 and 1991. The KLF co-produced the Moody Boys' "First National Rapper" in 1988 (as "The JAMs") and remixed "What Is Dub?" in 1991. Thorpe is also a credited as an "additional performer" on the KLF's The White Room album.

Vice and DJ Mag claim that Jimmy Cauty was actually a member of the Moody Boys, whereas AllMusic attributes the project to Thorpe and "occasional collaborators". Tracks produced by "Tony Thorpe and Jimmy Cauty" were credited separately to tracks produced by "The Moody Boys" on the 1991 single "Lion Dance", and a 1994 interview with Thorpe and a companion discography state that "Journey into Dubland" was made with Jimmy Cauty, suggesting Cauty was just a collaborator. The Moody Boys recorded a Peel Session in 1991 without Cauty; programming duties were handled by Thorpe and another close associate of the KLF, Nick Coler.

Cauty and his KLF-partner Bill Drummond retired from the music industry in 1992, but Thorpe continued under the revised "Moody Boyz" moniker until 1994, producing in this time what is considered to be the Moody name's best work, including another "classic", "Destination Africa", and the album, Product of the Environment. A remixed version, Recycled for the Environment, was also released to acclaim, featuring contributions from many remixers, including Andrew Weatherall and Dave Hedger.

== Reviews ==
AllMusic awarded Product of the Environment 4 stars (out of 5), dubbing the album "a visionary collection of subtly innovative techno and tribal house, with heaps of African and Caribbean influences".

In awarding Recycled for the Environment 4 stars (again, out of 5), AllMusic said, "styles range from lush tribal techno to murky ambient and spacy electro, each offering an inspired extrapolation of Thorpe's originals.".

== Selected discography ==
=== Albums ===
- Product of the Environment (1994) (as Moody Boyz)
- Recycled for the Environment (1994) (as Moody Boyz)

=== Singles ===
Acid Rappin'/Acid Heaven
Artist: The Moody Boys (Tony Thorpe). A-side features Rhyme & Reason.
Year: 1988
Label (Catalogue Number): City Beat (CBE 1230)
Produced & mixed by the House Addicts

First National Rapper
Artist: The Moody Boys
Year: 1988
Label (Catalogue Number): City Beat (CBE 1239)
Produced by the Moody Boys and the JAMs (KLF)

King Of The Funky Zulus
Artist: Moody Boys/Moody Boyz
Year: 1990
Label (Catalogue Number): United We Conquer (Zulu 1) (as Moody Boyz); other catalogue numbers as Moody Boys

Journey Into Dubland
Artist: The Moody Boys
Year: 1990
Label (Catalogue Number): XL Recordings (XLEP-107)
Produced, recorded and mixed: Live at Trancentral by Tony Thorpe and Jimmy Cauty

Funky Zulu (You're So Fresh)
Artist: The Moody Boys
Year: 1990
Label (Catalogue Number): XL Recordings (XLT-11)
Produced by the Moody Boys

What Is Dub?
Artist: The Moody Boys introduce Screamer
Year: 1991
Label (Catalogue Number): Love Records/Polydor (EVOLX 03)
Produced by the Moody Boys

What Is Dub? (The KLF And Apollo 440 Remixes)
Artist: The Moody Boys introduce Screamer
Year: 1991
Label (Catalogue Number): Love Records (EVOLR 3)
Produced by the Moody Boys
Remixes by The KLF, including a "Kings Of Low Frequency Dub Version", and Apollo 440

Lion Dance (Remix)
Artist: The Moody Boys
Year: 1991
Label (Catalogue Number): Fourth Floor Records (FF 1123)
Produced by the Moody Boys (some tracks); other tracks produced by Tony Thorpe and Jimmy Cauty

Centre Of The World
Artist: The Moody Boys
Year: 1992
Label (Catalogue Number): Love Records/Polydor (EVOLX 15)
Produced by the Moody Boys

Shango
Artist: The Moody Boyz
Year: 1994
Label (Catalogue Number): Guerilla Records (GRRR 65)
Produced by Moody Dog Productions (Handley/Turner/Downie/Thorpe) at Black Dog Towers

Recycled EP
Artist: Moody Boyz
Year: 1994
Label (Catalogue Number): Guerilla Records (GREP 006)

Destination Africa
Artist: The Moody Boys
Year: 1994
Label (Catalogue Number): SSR Records (SSR 141)

=== Remixes ===
What Time Is Love? (Remodelled & Remixed)
Artist: The KLF
Year: 1990
Catalogue Number: KLF Communications KLF 004Y
Featuring "What Time Is Love? (The Moody Boys vs The KLF)"

3 a.m. Eternal (The Moody Boys Selection)
Artist: The KLF
Year: 1991
Catalogue Number: KLF Communications KLF 005Y

Last Train to Trancentral (The KLF Meets The Moody Boys Uptown)
Artist: The KLF
Year: 1991
Catalogue Number: KLF Communications KLF 008Y

The Right Decision
Artist: Jesus Jones
Year: 1993
Catalogue Number: Food CDPERV 2
Featuring "The Right Decision (Moody Reconstruction Mix)"
