= The Four Sections =

1987 composition by Steve Reich

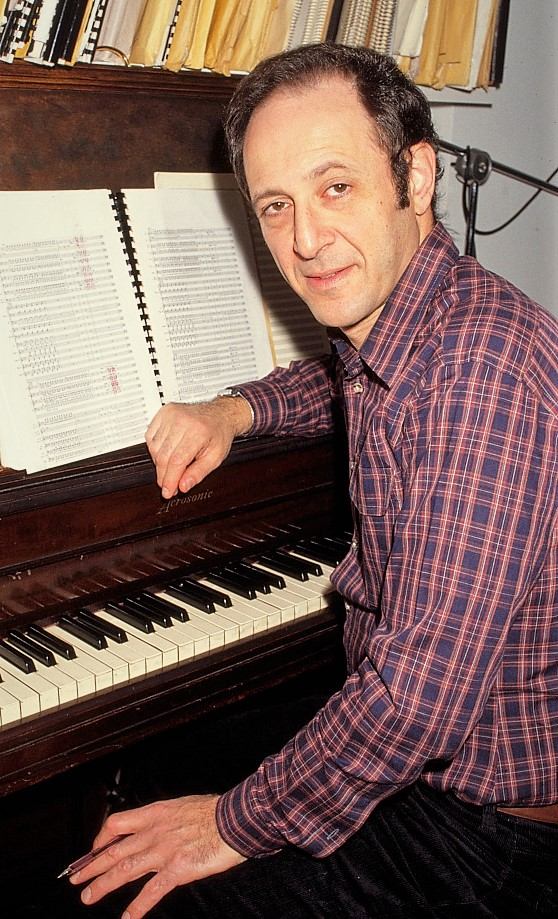
Steve Reich in the early 1980s

The Four Sections is an orchestral work by the minimalist American composer Steve Reich. The piece was commissioned for the San Francisco Symphony in honour of its 75th anniversary by the widow of Ralph Dorfman. It was completed in August 1987 and given its premiere that year on 7 October conducted by Michael Tilson Thomas in Davies Hall.

The title of the work refers to the four sections of the orchestra and the four harmonic sections dividing each movement. The work consists of the following movements:

1. Strings (with winds and brass) (♩ = 80)
2. Percussion (♩ = 80)
3. Winds and brass (with strings) (♩ = 120)
4. Full orchestra (♩ = 180)

The original idea for The Four Sections was suggested by Tilson Thomas in terms of a Concerto for Orchestra. Reich's approach to the concept of a Concerto for Orchestra was explicitly different from that of Bartok's 'soloist versus orchestra' piece. Instead, Reich saw the orchestra as a means to explore further the ideas presented in works like Six Marimbas and Violin Phase, where identical instruments are interlocked.

A typical recording lasts about 25 minutes.
