= Guerilla Records =

British record label

Guerilla's Generic Sleeve used for all record releases. (1990)

Guerilla Records was a British record label that was founded in 1990 by Dick O'Dell and John Gosling, with William Orbit. It specialised in a style of progressive house that they preferred to call "dub house", with artists such as Leftfield, Bass-O-Matic, React2Rhythm, Spooky, Moody Boyz, Felix Da Housecat, and Billie Ray Martin, and was a key player in the development of the progressive house sound in the UK in the early 1990s.

The label's distinctive blue camouflage generic sleeve was designed by graphic designer Steve Cook, known for his design and art direction of the British comic 2000 AD.

Guerilla Records Ltd was wound up in 1995, and finally dissolved in 2003.

== See also ==
- Lists of record labels
