= Peter Seymour =

- Born: November 17, 1977 (age 48); Dallas, Texas, U.S.
- Genres: Classical jazz
- Occupation: Musician
- Instrument: Double bass
- Years active: 1996 – present
- Member of: Project Trio

Peter Seymour (born November 17, 1977, in Dallas, Texas) is a double bass player and composer who resides in Brooklyn, New York. He is the co-creator, manager and bass player of Project Trio, an internationally touring chamber music ensemble. He has performed in concert halls around the world, including Severance Hall, The Concertgebow, Lincoln Center and Carnegie Hall. Seymour is also an active educator. As a member of Project Trio, he organizes and performs in more than 100 school concerts a year.

== Biography ==
Seymour earned his Bachelor of Music degree from the Cleveland Institute of Music and his Master of Music degree from Rice University, where he studied with Paul Ellison. While a student at Booker T. Washington High School for the Performing and Visual Arts, he won the 1997 Down Beat Award for best jazz soloist. In college, Seymour participated in some of America's finest music festivals, including Music Academy of the West, Chautauqua Institution and the New York String Orchestra Seminar at Mannes College.

After his education, Seymour went on to play in the New World Symphony Orchestra under the direction of Michael Tilson Thomas. He was also a member of the Colorado Music Festival Orchestra for seven seasons. Seymour has performed with a multitude of world class orchestras, including Houston Symphony, Iris Orchestra, the New York City Ballet and the Cleveland Orchestra.

While a member of the Colorado Music Festival, Seymour and the cellist Eric Stephenson conceived of forming a chamber music group that would combine elements of jazz, classical and popular music. Their original idea was to come together two or three times a year in various cities around the US for a week-long music infusion with concert and education/outreach activities. They approached the flautist Greg Patillo and created Project Trio. In 2005, they gathered in Cleveland for a series of performances and music workshops for youth. Seymour continued to work as a sub for the Cleveland Orchestra but after Patillo placed a video on YouTube that became a viral success for its unique mix of beatboxing and flute, he was persuaded to move to New York City to join Patillo and Stephenson. Project Trio has since recorded three critically acclaimed albums and performed in concert halls, clubs, classrooms and music festivals around the world, including Kennedy Center, Brooklyn Academy of Music and South By Southwest. The group also continues to be active in music education.

== Discography ==
- Project Trio: Live in Concert(DVD) (Harmonyville Records, 2011)
- Project Trio Live Cuts No. 2 (Harmonyville Records, 2011)
- Project Trio Live Cuts No. 1 (Harmonyville Records, 2011)
- Project Trio (Harmonyville Records, 2010)
- Brooklyn (Harmonyville Records, 2009)
- Winter in June (Harmonyville Records, 2007)
