= Tank (album) =

Studio album by Asian Dub Foundation
- Released: 28 February 2005
- Recorded: 2004–2005
- Genre: Electronica
- Length: 53:40
- Label: EMI

Asian Dub Foundation chronology
Live: Keep Bangin' on the Walls (2003)	Tank (2005)	Time Freeze: The Best of Asian Dub Foundation (2007)

Tank is the fifth studio album by British alternative electronica band Asian Dub Foundation.

== Track listing ==
1. Flyover (4:17)
2. Tank (5:36)
3. Hope (5:09)
4. Round Up (4:36)
5. Oil (4:33)
6. Powerlines (4:34)
7. Who Runs the Place (4:11)
8. Take Back the Power (4:27)
9. Warring Dhol (5:54)
10. Tomorrow Begins Today (3:59)
11. Melody 7 (6:14)
