= Greg Pattillo =

American musician

- Born: July 1, 1977 (age 49); Seattle, Washington, U.S.
- Occupation: Musician
- Instruments: Flute, beatboxing
- Years active: 2011–present
- Member of: Project Trio
- Website: pattillostyle.com

Greg Pattillo (born July 1, 1977) is an American beatboxing flutist originally from Seattle, but now operating in Brooklyn, New York. He was lauded by The New York Times as "the best person in the world at what he does." His performance videos on YouTube, showcasing "beatbox flute," have been viewed more than 70 million times.

Pattillo earned both his bachelor's and master's degrees from the Cleveland Institute of Music as a student of Joshua Smith, the principal flutist of the Cleveland Orchestra. After a summer spent as the acting principal flute of Guangzhou Symphony Orchestra, Pattillo moved to San Francisco where he was a founding member of the Collaborative Arts Insurgency and the 16th and Mission Thursday Night gathering for performers. Though noteworthy for his innovations combining beatbox and flute, Pattillo deserves recognition as an arranger and composer who infuses elements of jazz and hip hop into his compositions for flute and Project Trio.

Pattillo enjoys freelancing as a soloist, and is the flutist of the group PROJECT Trio. PROJECT Trio is a chamber music ensemble based in Brooklyn. The trio features Greg Pattillo on flute, Eric Stephenson on cello, and Peter Seymour on bass.

In June 2007, Pattillo was named one of 21 winners of the Metropolitan Transit Authority's "Music Under New York" program. Among other things the award gives Pattillo an official permit, of sorts, to play music in the subway.

Pattillo was also seen on an episode of Nickelodeon's TV series, iCarly (and was said to be Sam's cousin who was not in jail) and has videos and recordings on iCarly.com. He also appeared as a guest on one episode of Lily Allen and Friends in the UK shown on BBC Three.

In May 2010, he premiered a concerto for Beatbox Flute, composed by Randall Woolf and performed with the UNCSA Symphony Orchestra.

Greg currently works with his band PROJECT Trio, along with many showcases.

== See also ==
- Flute beatboxing
