= Bogart's (Long Beach, California) =

Coordinates: 33°45′35″N 118°6′50″W

Bogart's was a 300-capacity music venue located at 6288 Pacific Coast Highway in Long Beach, California. The club opened in 1987 and closed in 1993.

Performers at Bogart's included Nirvana, Stone Temple Pilots, Sublime, Robin Trower, Jonathan Richman, Prong, Faith No More, Babyland and Mark Farner.
