= Beat Records =

Independent American record label

- Founded: 1978
- Founder: Stephen Zepeda
- Defunct: 1980
- Status: Inactive
- Country of origin: United States
- Location: Los Angeles, California

Beat Records was an independent record label started by California night club promoter Stephen Zepeda (a.k.a. Steve Zepeda). Beat Records had record releases by Gary Valentine (of Blondie), The Furys, and The Plimsouls (featuring Peter Case). It spanned the 1978 to 1980 time period of Los Angeles rock.

Zepeda is best known for booking Bogart's night club in Long Beach, California, which was a very popular hub for alternative music in the late 1980s and early 1990s.

== Releases by Beat Records ==
- "The First One"/"Tomorrow Belongs To You", Gary Valentine (1978) – 45 rpm
- "Moving Target"/"We Talk We Dance", The Furys (1979) – 45 rpm
- Zero Hour E.P., The Plimsouls (1980) - "Great Big World" / "Zero Hour" / "Hypnotized" / "How Long Will It Take?" / "I Can't Turn You Loose, 12 inch E.P.

== See also ==
- List of record labels
- Record labels based in California
