= Flute beatboxing =

Flute technique

Flute beatboxing (or fluteboxing) is an extended technique of the flute, or an extension in sound resonators for beatboxing. Involving the production of distinct and stereoscopic flute tones (producing two separate sounds by humming while blowing into the flute) combined with vocal percussion and aural prestidigitation (sleight-of-ear), flute beatboxing enables the use of the flute as a rhythmic instrument.

Greg Pattillo developed a system of essentially traditional notation for flute beatboxing, with one staff for the flute and another for the percussive effects, the latter similar to that for drum kits since beatboxing is based on the three sounds of the hi-hat, snare rimshot, and bass drum.

In May 2010, Pattillo premiered a concerto for beatbox flute, composed by Randall Woolf and performed with the UNCSA Symphony Orchestra.
