= Asian Dub Foundation =

English electronica band

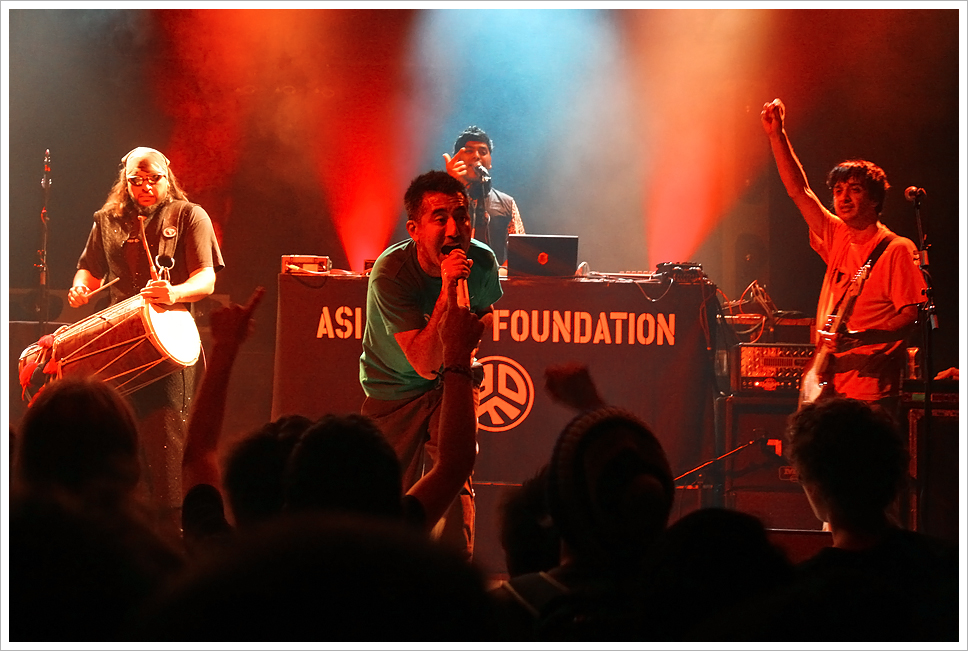
- Asian Dub Foundation performing live in Berlin, November 2008

Background information
- Also known as: ADF
- Origin: London, England
- Genres: Jungle; big beat; trip hop; drum and bass; electronic rock; Asian underground
- Years active: 1993–present
- Labels: Slash; Virgin; FFRR; EMI; Cooking Vinyl; Naïve; Beat; X-Ray Productions
- Members: Aniruddha Das; John Pandit; Steve Chandra Savale; Aktar Ahmed; Ghetto Priest; Nathan Flutebox Lee; Brian Fairbairn
- Past members: Deeder Zaman; Lisa Das; Martin Savale; Al Rumjen; Lord Kimo; Prithpal Rajput; Dipa Joshi; Sanjay Taylor; Rocky Singh
- Website: asiandubfoundation.com

Asian Dub Foundation (ADF) are an English electronic music band that combines musical styles including rap rock, dub, dancehall, ragga, ReggaeEDM, and South Asian music. The group also includes traditional rock instruments such as electric bass and guitar, which acknowledges a punk rock influence. Their music is known for its dub-inspired basslines, guitar parts inspired by the traditional Indian instrument the sitar, and fast rapping.

== History ==
Asian Dub Foundation (ADF) was formed in summer 1993 from an education workshop in Farringdon, London, run by Aniruddha Das (bass, programming) and assisted by John Pandit (mixing) which was attended by rapper Deeder Zaman. This early line-up released the sound-system based Conscious EP in late 1993 on Nation Records. Guitarist/programmer Steve Chandra Savale was invited to join in early 1994 and ADF became more of a band format. Sanjay Tailor joined the band as live midi/programmer and DJ soon after. This completed the full live line-up of the band and their debut album Facts and Fictions was released in late 1995, following the single "Rebel Warrior".

Initially not widely known in a UK music scene focused on Britpop, the band toured in mainland Europe and gained a substantial following, particularly in France where their French-only release R.A.F.I. sold 100,000 copies. In early 1997 the band was signed by London Records. Their British profile was upped considerably by the support of Primal Scream with whom the band toured regularly. Their second album Rafi's Revenge (1998) combined punk energy with a jungle/reggae core, and was nominated for a Mercury Prize. The single "Naxalite" was an ode to the militant Naxalite movement in India. Tours to the United States (with the Beastie Boys) and Japan followed.

Their following album, Community Music (2000), developed their sound further and received a 10/10 review in NME. In 2000, ADF played a slot on Glastonbury Festival's Pyramid stage. At the end of 2000, Deeder Zaman announced his plans to go solo, his last gig being at Alexandra Palace alongside Primal Scream and Ian Brown.

Their first project of 2001 was an attempt to create a live re-score of Mathieu Kassovitz's film La Haine at the Barbican Centre's "Only Connect" festival in London. The gig was sold out and received critical praise, particularly from Max Bell and Steven Wells. They did the piece again by invitation of David Bowie at his South Bank Meltdown Festival in 2002; in attendance was Kassovitz. The band went to Brazil to collaborate with community activist Afro-Reggae with new band members MC Aktarv8tr, Spex MC, Rocky Singh (drums), and Prithpal Rajput (dhol).

In 2002, Pandit G was awarded the MBE for "services to the music industry" in relation to his work with Community Music. He declined the award, however, stating:

I personally don't think it's appropriate. I've never supported the honours system. If you want to acknowledge projects like [Community Music], the work that these organisations do, then fund them. There's no point in giving an individual an accolade to bring people into the establishment; [it] won't actually help the organisations! If you want to acknowledge the work of these organisations, prioritise funding so they can grow and expand and do the work that they do (in) creating new music, giving people the opportunities to make music, develop new musicians and create pathways where they can go out and establish themselves in the music industry.

In 2003, they released Enemy of the Enemy, which became their best-selling album and contained the track "Fortress Europe", an attack on European immigration policy, along with "1000 Mirrors", a collaboration with Sinéad O'Connor about a woman serving life for killing an abusive husband. In 2003, they played their biggest gig in front of 100,000 people in France at a celebration of José Bové, a radical campaigning farmer. For 2005's Tank, they were joined by On-U Sound collaborator Ghetto Priest on vocals, with the help of Adrian Sherwood.

The band continued performing their La Haine soundtrack around the world for the next five years. They developed this approach in 2004 with another improvised soundtrack to the film The Battle of Algiers, first performing the piece at the Brighton Dome.

In 2005, they won "Best Underground" at the UK Asian Music Awards.

Bassist Dr Das announced his intention to retire in May 2006 to resume teaching and produce his own music. He was replaced by Martin Savale, who also plays bass with British-Asian electro/grunge/hip-hop band Swami.

In September 2006, the dub/punk opera "Gaddafi: A Living Myth", with music by ADF, opened at the London Coliseum. In Spring 2007, Asian Dub Foundation announced the release of a best of compilation Time Freeze: The Best of Asian Dub Foundation which included a bonus disc of rare remixes and live tracks, including a live recording of a Public Enemy song featuring Chuck D. The album also featured a new track recorded with former vocalist Deeder Zaman. In May 2007 ADF performed a radio session and interview on the Bobby and Nihal show on BBC Radio 1 where they performed three new tracks: "Climb On", "Superpower" and "S.O.C.A.". In June 2007, they were the only Western act to perform at the Festival of Gnawa music in Essaouira, Morocco playing to a crowd of 60,000 people and collaborating with traditional Gnawa musicians.

In August 2007, Asian Dub Foundation played with two new vocalists, Al Rumjen (previously and subsequently with King Prawn) and Aktarv8r, who returned after MC Spex was asked to leave the band due to personal issues. In November/December 2007, Asian Dub Foundation recorded a new album, Punkara. It was released in March 2008 and followed by a tour of Europe and Japan.

In 2009, ADF contributed to the Indigenous Resistance project after having met up with the Atenco movement in Mexico. The band worked on their new album, provisionally entitled A New London Eye, which would feature Ministry of Dhol, Nathan "Flutebox" Lee, Chi 2 and Skrein. The album eventually came out as The History of Now and the band toured extensively to promote it. The cover contained many fantasy iPhone "Apps" intended to parody the contemporary age.

In May 2012, the band was asked by immersive pop-up subversives Secret Cinema to revive their live soundtrack to La Haine at Broadwater Farm and also performed the piece in Paris the night of the French elections. Later that year ADF were rejoined by Dr. Das, Ghetto Priest and Rocky Singh. They recorded a new album, The Signal and the Noise, and headlined a series of festivals including "Bearded Theory" and "Asigiri Jam" in Japan. In 2013, The Signal and the Noise was released only in Japan.

In 2014, the band debuted their live soundtrack to THX 1138, George Lucas's first feature-length film. George Lucas and his collaborator Walter Murch gave their blessing to the project and it was performed at the Brooklyn Festival in Prospect Park which led to an Arts Council Sponsored Tour of the UK in 2015.

In 2015, ADF released More Signal More Noise jointly between Believe Records their own ADF Communications imprint. The album was a re-recorded version of the 2013 Japan only release. They were joined in early 2015 by ex-The Prodigy drummer Brian Fairbairn and toured Italy with a revived version of their La Haine soundtrack.

They recorded a BBC Radio 6 session for Tom Robinson in 2015 and played headline slots at WOMAD and Boomtown festivals in 2016.

In June 2017, it was announced that the band is working on an upcoming album, titled Access Denied.

In May 2019, the band released Youth Quake Pt 1, pairing electronica and breakbeats with a speech that teenage Swedish activist Greta Thunberg gave to the United Nations conference on climate change in 2018, in support of Extinction Rebellion and the urgent struggle for Climate Justice. The band reissued the album Rafi's Revenge the same year.

In April 2020, the band released the video for Stealing the Future. The track was from the album Access Denied that was released in September of the same year. Collaborators on the album include comedian Stewart Lee, Palestinian refugee band 47Soul, Ana Tijoux and Dub FX.

=== Campaign for UK singles chart number one ===
In September 2020, the band released their song with Stewart Lee called "Comin’ Over Here". This track was based on a sketch from the BBC programme Stewart Lee's Comedy Vehicle, which was a routine about the UKIP politician (and later, party leader) Paul Nuttall. In December 2020, a video for the song was released, which was part of an internet campaign to get the record to number one in time for the chart published by the Official Charts Company on 31 December 2020, thereby making it the 'Brexit Day Number One'. The song debuted at number 65 on the UK Singles Chart and made it to number 1 on the UK Singles Sales Chart.

== Discography ==
=== UK albums ===
- Facts and Fictions (1995)
- Rafi's Revenge (1998) UK number 20 (reissued 2019)
- Community Music (2000) UK number 20
- Enemy of the Enemy (2003)
- Tank (2005)
- Punkara (2008)
- A History of Now (2011)
- More Signal More Noise (2015)
- Access Denied (2020)

=== Live albums, compilations, alternate mixes ===
- R.A.F.I. (1997) (originally only released in France)
- Conscious Party (1998) (originally only released in France)
- Frontline 1993-1997: rarities and remixes (2001)
- Live: Keep Bangin' on the Walls (2003) live at Ancienne Belgique
- Time Freeze: The Best of Asian Dub Foundation (2007)
- The Signal and the Noise (2013) (originally only released in Japan, basis for More Signal More Noise)
- More Signal More Noise: The Remixes (2015)
- Access Denied (2020)

=== Singles ===
- 1997: "Naxalite" - UK number 94
- 1998: "Free Satpal Ram" - UK number 56
- 1998: "Buzzin'" - UK number 31
- 1998: "Black White" - UK number 52
- 2000: "Real Great Britain" - UK number 41
- 2000: "New Way, New Life" - UK number 49
- 2003: "Fortress Europe" - UK number 57
- 2003: "1000 Mirrors" (feat. Sinéad O'Connor)
- 12/10/2010: "A History of Now"
- 2015: "Zig Zag Nation"
- 2015: "The Signal and the Noise"
- 2015: "Stand Up"
- 2020: "Comin' Over Here" - UK number 65

=== DVDs ===
- Asian Dub Foundation Live (DVD) (2003)

== See also ==
- Declining a British honour
