= Children with AIDS Charity =

British HIV/AIDS charity

Children With AIDS Charity was a national UK charity to help children infected or affected by HIV/AIDS maintain a good quality of life. CWAC was set up in 1992 with the aim of "working towards a future without poverty or prejudice for these children and their families". CWAC closed in 2014.

== Founding ==
Children With AIDS Charity was founded in October 1993 by Rebecca Handel, Jo Dodge, and the paediatric team of St Mary’s Hospital in Paddington. Together they decided that a charity should be formed that could respond to the specific practical, emotional and educational requirements of children and their families infected and affected by HIV.

Rebecca contracted HIV through a blood transfusion in her second pregnancy, before blood was screened for the virus in 1981. Since she was white, middle-class and Jewish, Rebecca did not meet any of the HIV-positive stereotypes at the time. Bonnie Handel, Rebecca’s daughter from that pregnancy, died in St Mary’s Hospital the following December; Rebecca Handel died on 1 January 1995.
