= Steve Chandra Savale =

British musician

- A promotional poster for the Al-Jazeera English show, Music of Resistance

Background information
- Also known as: Chandrasonic
- Born: Steve Chandra Savale
- Origin: London, United Kingdom
- Genres: Electronica, dub, drum and bass, big beat
- Occupations: Musician, singer-songwriter, composer
- Instrument: guitar
- Years active: 1986–present
- Labels: Slash, Virgin, FFRR, EMI, Cake
- Website: www.asiandubfoundation.com,

Steve Chandra Savale is a British musician. He joined Asian Dub Foundation in 1994 and has been the band’s longest-serving member. He developed a guitar style that maintained a punk aggression but could work within a Dub/Jungle foundation, utilising unusual textures and FX (1). He has co-produced and co-written on all nine of the bands’ official studio albums and initiated the concept of what become their live re-score of the film La Haine which they have played consistently since 2001.

== Biography ==
Steve Chandra Savale was born in West London. His father was Sharad Savale, chargehand electrician, an immigrant from Hyderabad, India, and his mother was Jean Worsfold from Littlehampton, England, who previous to marriage had worked on an assembly line packing biscuits. Their marriage was unusual by 1950's standards. They had a common interest in music and early dates were Buddy Holly at the London Palladium and Ravi Shankar at the Royal Festival Hall, as outlined in the bands’ contribution to the “Music Migrations” exhibition in Paris. (2) Savale credits his parents for imparting to him a distinctive outlook on music. His father, Sharad had been imprisoned in India at the age of 14 for taking part in a violent demonstration against the British and his grandfather, Laxman Savale, had been sentenced to death in the 1930s by the British for sedition though given a last-minute reprieve.

Savale has said his initial aim was to be a science fiction writer and his early musical interests reflected this. As a child, He has said he bought three re-released singles because they felt very spacy ("Good Vibrations", "Itchycoo Park" and "Space Oddity"). As a child, he discovered Pink Floyd’s first album “Piper At the Gates of Dawn” the opening track of which made him want to play guitar (3). Other important early influences included the soundtrack music of Lalo Schifrin, Indian classical music, and his fathers cassettes recorded from the British-Asian TV programme Nai Zingadai Naya Jeevan, later celebrated in the Asian Dub Foundation track “New Way, New Life” The cassettes also introduced Savale to Qawwali though he didn't know the name of this style of music at the time(4.) He started playing in bands in the eighties and had come under the influence of bands such as Joy Division, Public Image and Gang of Four, having also by this time discovered Dub Reggae and Sly Stone.

His first record release came with Birmingham based Jazz-Punk band the Atom Spies formed with longtime friends. In 1990 Savale answered an ad placed by Dr Das (later to form ADF) which stated “Black/Asian musicians required for experimental dub/noise project”; Savale was the only person who replied, and subsequently Headspace was formed. It was then he gained the moniker Chandrasonic because he used to tune all of the strings on his guitar to one note and play it with a knife. In Birmingham, Savale and producer/guitarist Bobby Bird had secured a record deal for their dance/rock hybrid band Kirk’s Equator. However after taking Bird to an experimental rave featuring Headspace and Orbital, Kirk’s Equator morphed into the Higher Intelligence Agency who became a fixture in the nascent Ambient Techno scene. Savale’s voice appears on their first release “Ketamine Entity” and he co-wrote “Speedlearn” along with some other contributions to the “Colourform” album (5). Bird and Savale parted ways soon after.

In 1994, Dr Das called him up to ask him to join Asian Dub Foundation with the idea that it should become more of a band than the sound system based format it had been in its first few months. Steve Chandra Savale joined Asian Dub Foundation in 1994 and has been the band’s longest-serving member. He developed a guitar style that maintained a punk aggression but could work within a Dub/Jungle foundation, utilising unusual textures and FX (1). He had co-produced and co-written on all nine of the bands’ official studio albums and initiated the concept of what become their live re-score of the film “La Haine” which they have played consistently since 2001. The band went on to have significant international success and this has been his main interest ever since.

== Interviewer ==
Savale has interviewed prominent leftist intellectual, historian, political campaigner, author, and filmmaker Tariq Ali about the war on terrorism, Pakistan, 1960s musicians and their activism, and health care in the United States.

== Music of Resistance ==
In 2009 Savale presented the Music of Resistance, a six-part documentary series that tells the stories of musicians who fight repression and sing about injustices. They are unique musical personalities from some of the world's most troubled areas – what makes them different is their need to communicate their politics through music. They are all ambitious and talented but for them 'making it' is not about diamonds and sports cars – it is about radical political change. They came from Nigeria, Mozambique, the favelas of Brazil, Cape Verde, the desert of the Sahel and London.
