= Welcome to the Dark Ages =

Welcome to the Dark Ages was a three-day event organised by The Justified Ancients of Mu Mu (the JAMs; more widely known as The KLF), held in Liverpool in August 2017. The event heralded a revival of the creative partnership between Jimmy Cauty and Bill Drummond, under the name with which they first recorded and released music together in 1987. The duo had last worked together in 1997, when, as 2K, they staged an art performance and released a single, "Fuck the Millennium", and, as K2 Plant Hire Ltd, hatched a plan to build a "People's Pyramid" to celebrate the new millennium.

During the event, the JAMs launched their new work, a novel called 2023: A Trilogy, and revealed fresh plans to build a "People's Pyramid". The event also marked 23 years since Drummond and Cauty controversially burnt one million pounds sterling and an end to their self-imposed moratorium on discussing it.

== Background ==
Music-industry figure Bill Drummond and artist/musician Jimmy Cauty began recording together in 1987 as The Justified Ancients of Mu Mu (also known as The JAMs), naming themselves after the fictional conspiratorial group "The Justified Ancients of Mummu" from The Illuminatus! Trilogy. In 1988 they had a UK number one hit single - Doctorin' the Tardis - as The Timelords, and subsequently wrote their first book together - The Manual - documenting the process of making a hit record.

After transitioning into The KLF, Cauty and Drummond became the biggest-selling singles act in the world for 1991. In May 1992, the KLF announced their immediate retirement from the music industry and the deletion of their back catalogue.

Flush with cash from their pop career, the duo formed the K Foundation, a creative outlet for their art projects and media campaigns. On 23 August 1994, the K Foundation infamously burnt what was left of their KLF earnings — a million pounds — and filmed the performance. They later issued a statement that on 5 November 1995 they had signed a "contract" at Cape Wrath in northern Scotland agreeing to wind up the K Foundation and not to speak about the money burning for a period of 23 years. The number 23 - or the 23 enigma - is a recurring theme in both The Illuminatus! Trilogy and the work of the KLF.

Since 1995, Cauty and Drummond have been directors of a company called K2 Plant Hire Ltd. (Note: "Jimmy and Bill aren't an art foundation any more. 'We're K2 Plant Hire,' announces Jimmy. 'We have been for two to three years. We're a limited company.'") In 1997, K2 Plant Hire announced plans for a "People's Pyramid", a 150-foot (46 m)-high structure that would be built from as many house bricks as there were British 20th century births (estimated by the duo as 87 million), with no cost to the taxpayer. In the same year, Drummond and Cauty performed together and released a single, "Fuck the Millennium", as 2K.

== 2017: What The Fuck Is Going On? ==
In early January 2017, rumours began to circulate that The KLF were to make a comeback; the rumours stemmed from the posting of a video purportedly - but not - by The KLF to YouTube on the 1st of that month. A KLF comeback was denied by Drummond, who stated that whilst "Jimmy Cauty and I have always remained very close... we have no plans to reform the KLF or exploit our back catalogue in any way."

However, on 5 January, a poster was spotted in Hackney, London with the heading "2017: WHAT THE FUCK IS GOING ON?", echoing the press advert for - and title of - the KLF's 23 minute comeback performance as 2K in 1997 - "1997 (What The Fuck's Going On?)", and a reference to The JAMs' debut album 1987 (What the Fuck Is Going On?). The poster announced a return of The Justified Ancients of Mu Mu on 23 August 2017, and asked those seeking further information to contact K2 Plant Hire Ltd; this was followed by a confirmatory tweet by Cauty directing readers to K2 Plant Hire's Twitter account. The poster also contained a disclaimer from Drummond and Cauty that they had had "zero involvement with any video clips, films, recorded music, documentary productions, biographies, West End musicals or social media chatter relating to the letters K L or F, now or at any other time over the previous 23 years".

Peter Robinson, writing in The Guardian, called Drummond's earlier denial a "feat of semantic nuance" because whilst indeed The KLF would not be making a return nor exploiting their back catalogue, the Justified Ancients of Mu Mu were working on new material, material that he assumed to be music. Fact Magazine made the same assumption. "2017 needs the KLF", Robinson concluded, "and if not the KLF, at the very least a KLF". It soon became apparent, however, that the JAMs would be releasing not music but a novel, 2023: A Trilogy.

== Welcome To The Dark Ages ==
At 23 seconds past midnight on 23 August 2017, 23 years after they burnt a million pounds, Drummond and Cauty arrived at the "News From Nowhere" bookshop in Liverpool in their decrepit ice cream van, its chimes playing a mashup of "What Time Is Love?", "Justified and Ancient", and "O Sole Mio". (Note: A journalist participant from The Guardian reported the arrival as 23 minutes after midnight.)

The JAMs launched 2023: A Trilogy with a book stamping. They then staged three days of events along with 400 fans (called 'volunteers') under the banner of "Welcome to the Dark Ages". Ending the self-imposed moratorium, the festival included a debate asking "Why Did The K Foundation Burn A Million Quid?"

== The People's Pyramid and the Toxteth Day Of The Dead ==
During "Welcome To The Dark Ages", Cauty and Drummond announced the creation of an undertakers' business, "Callender, Callender, Cauty and Drummond, Undertakers to the Underworld" - a collaboration between K2 Plant Hire and the Green Funeral Company - and new plans for a People's Pyramid, the earlier plan having never come to fruition.

The People's Pyramid is to be built from bricks each containing 23 grams of human ashes. The first brick to be laid contained the ashes of Cauty's brother Simon, who died in 2016; Jimmy Cauty will also be made into a brick upon his death. Cauty and Drummond are working on the project, and set up a process and a website - MuMufication - where people can sign up to be interred in the Pyramid for £99. The slogan is "Buy now, die later". The "Toxteth Day Of The Dead" will take place on the 23rd of November every year, to lay the bricks created in the preceding 12 months.

Cauty emphasised to the BBC in 2018 that the project, inspired by his brother's death, is serious: "It's easy to make it sound like a joke", he said, "but it isn't a joke, it's deadly serious and it's a long-term project." He also confirmed that The Justified Ancients of Mu Mu are a going concern - "It's interesting to be in a band that doesn't make records but only makes pyramids of dead people.
