= 2023: A Trilogy =

2017 book by Jimmy Cauty and Bill Drummond

2023: A Trilogy by The Justified Ancients of Mu Mu
- Author: The Justified Ancients of Mu Mu
- Language: English
- Genre: Alternative histories; Science fiction
- Published: London
- Publisher: Faber and Faber
- Publication date: 2017
- Publication place: United Kingdom
- ISBN: 9780571338085
- OCLC: 1041418081
- Website: http://k2planthireltd.com/
- REMEMBERED – TOLD – TRANSCRIBED for K 2 Plant Hire Ltd

2023: A Trilogy is a book by Jimmy Cauty and Bill Drummond writing as The Justified Ancients of Mu Mu. The book was published in 2017, 23 years after the duo had burnt one million British pounds they earned in the music industry as The KLF.

== Background ==
Music-industry figure Bill Drummond and artist/musician Jimmy Cauty began recording together in 1987 as The Justified Ancients of Mu Mu (also known as The JAMs), naming themselves after the fictional conspiratorial group "The Justified Ancients of Mummu" from The Illuminatus! Trilogy. In 1988 they had a UK number one hit single—"Doctorin' the Tardis"—as The Timelords, and subsequently wrote their first book together—The Manual—documenting the process of making a hit record.

After transitioning into The KLF, Cauty and Drummond became the biggest-selling singles act in the world for 1991. In May 1992, the KLF announced their immediate retirement from the music industry and the deletion of their back catalogue. Flush with cash from their pop career, the duo formed the K Foundation, a creative outlet for their art projects and media campaigns. On 23 August 1994, the K Foundation infamously burnt what was left of their KLF earnings—a million pounds—and filmed the performance. They later issued a statement that on 5 November 1995 they had signed a "contract" at Cape Wrath in northern Scotland agreeing to wind up the K Foundation and not to speak about the money burning for a period of 23 years.

On 5 January 2017, a poster attributed to Cauty and Drummond's company K2 Plant Hire Ltd was sighted in Hackney, London with the heading "2017: WHAT THE FUCK IS GOING ON?", echoing the press advert for—and title of—the KLF's 23 minute comeback performance as 2K in 1997—"1997 (What The Fuck's Going On?)", and a reference to The JAMs' debut album 1987 (What the Fuck Is Going On?). The poster announced that the Justified Ancients Of Mu Mu "are currently at work in their light industrial unit", and that the work would be made public on 23 August 2017, but Drummond denied that the duo had any plans "to reform the KLF or exploit our back catalogue in any way". Nonetheless, rumours were rife that The Justified Ancients Of Mu Mu would be making a return to the music business, this assumption being made by at least The Guardian, Fact Magazine and the NME. It soon became apparent, however, that the JAMs would be releasing not music but a novel titled 2023: A Trilogy.

== Book launch ==
At 23 seconds past midnight on 23 August, 23 years after they burnt a million pounds, (Note: A journalist participant from The Guardian reported the arrival as 23 minutes after midnight.) Drummond and Cauty arrived at the "News From Nowhere" bookshop in Liverpool in their ice cream van and officially launched 2023: A Trilogy. The number 23—or the 23 enigma—is a recurring theme in both The Illuminatus! Trilogy and the work of the KLF. Following a book stamping, Cauty and Drummond staged a three-day festival called "Welcome to the Dark Ages".

== Plot ==
Hannah Ellis-Petersen writing in The Guardian describes the book as "a multi-layered, self-referential meta tale."

== Cover ==
Like Illuminatus!, the cover of 2023 features a pyramid. The pyramid on the cover of The Illuminatus! Trilogy references the Eye of Providence icon, often depicted as an eye within a triangle or pyramid. The pyramid has been another consistent feature in the duo work's: KLF Communications' logo was the "Pyramid Blaster", a pyramid, in front of which is suspended a ghetto blaster displaying the word "Justified". During the duo's 1997 re-emergence, they proposed the building by K2 Plant Hire of a "People's Pyramid" to be built with as many bricks as there were births in the 20th century in the UK, and the plan was rebooted during "Welcome to the Dark Ages" with the pyramid now to be built from bricks containing the ashes of dead people.

== Critical reception ==
Jake Arnott, in a review for The Guardian, said the book was "enslaved by its sources", pointing to its many references to pop culture and its "disparate backstories", but "there is too much borrowing and simply not enough stealing".
