= ***k the Millennium =

1997 single by 2K

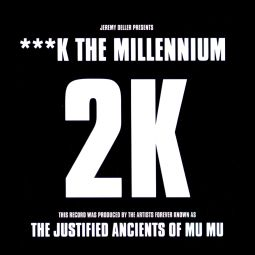

Single by 2K
- Released: 13 October 1997
- Studio: Parr Street Studios (Liverpool); Konk Studios (London)
- Genre: Acid house
- Length: 13:57
- Label: Blast First; Mute (UK)
- Songwriters: Jimmy Cauty; Bill Drummond
- Producers: Bill Drummond; Jimmy Cauty

Drummond and Cauty singles chronology
"K Cera Cera" (1993)	"***k the Millennium" (1997)

"***k the Millennium", pronounced and sometimes spelled as "Fuck the Millennium", is a protest song by the band 2K—Bill Drummond and Jimmy Cauty—better known as the Justified Ancients of Mu Mu (the JAMs) or the KLF. The song was inspired musically by Jeremy Deller's "Acid Brass" project, where a traditional brass band plays acid house classics; these include the KLF's "What Time Is Love?". They were also inspired topically by the then-forthcoming end of the second millennium and the plans to celebrate it.

"***k the Millennium" was built around the KLF and Acid Brass' versions of "What Time Is Love?", and premiered at 2K's "1997 (What The Fuck's Going On?)" event at London's Barbican Arts Centre on 17 September 1997. The performance featured, amongst others, Acid Brass, Mark Manning and Gimpo, and was directed by Ken Campbell. 2K's lifespan was billed as the duration of the Barbican performance—23 minutes.

The song was released as a comeback single to mark the tenth anniversary of Drummond and Cauty's first collaborations; however, the performance and single were also in part intended to mock the notion of the comeback. "***k the Millennium" reached number 28 in the UK Singles Chart in October 1997. The single remains the only international commercial release of music by the duo since The KLF's 1992 retirement.

Drummond and Cauty's campaign to "fuck the millennium" also involved a number of outlandish activities and proposals under the umbrella of their company K2 Plant Hire Ltd. These activities were intended to culminate in the construction of "The People's Pyramid", a 150-foot-high (46 m) structure built from recycled bricks at no cost to the taxpayer and which would have no entry fee—in pointed contrast to the UK government's Millennium Dome, construction of which had begun earlier in the year—and for people to use as they saw fit, including painting it or chipping it away. The pyramid was never built but the JAMs rebooted the idea in 2017 at their next comeback event, Welcome to the Dark Ages.

== Context ==
From 1987 to 1992, Jimmy Cauty and Bill Drummond released music under names including the Justified Ancients of Mu Mu (The JAMs) and the KLF. Following a run of five consecutive UK top-five singles, The KLF executed a high-profile retirement from the music business and deleted their entire back catalogue, declaring that "For the foreseeable future, there will be no further record releases from any past, present or future name attached to our activities." In the four years following the KLF's retirement, Drummond and Cauty's musical output consisted of only a limited edition single released in Israel and Palestine ("K Cera Cera"), and a charitable contribution to The Help Album ("The Magnificent"). Drummond and Cauty's art project, the K Foundation, disposed of the KLF's earnings, including by burning one million pounds of it, money which was originally provisionally earmarked by the duo for millennium celebrations. Bill Drummond: "Originally we were going to invest the whole lot in some capital growth fund and spend it all on one big event, maybe at the millennium."

The UK's preparations for celebrating the end of the second millennium were well underway by 1997 and had already become a hot – and controversial – political topic. Following the 1997 United Kingdom general election in May, the new Labour government agreed to go ahead with the "Millennium Experience" project, an exhibition to be housed in a purpose-built Millennium Dome, at an estimated cost of £580 million, £450 million of which would be funded by the National Lottery. (Note: According to McGuigan, the project ultimately consumed £628m in Lottery funding and nearly £200m in government funding.) Construction of the Dome began in June 1997.

Also in 1997, British artist Jeremy Deller launched his Acid Brass concept, collaborating with the Williams Fairey Brass Band to interpret and perform classic acid house tracks as brass arrangements. Deller was described by one source as a prankster, a notion frequently applied to Drummond and Cauty themselves. In February 1997, Drummond was contacted by his former Big in Japan bandmate Jayne Casey, who was helping to organise an arts festival in Liverpool and had noticed that Acid Brass' repertoire included the KLF's "What Time Is Love?". Drummond attended the festival performance and heard "What Time Is Love?" performed as the encore, during which he excitedly telephoned Cauty. Cauty and Drummond together attended a 19 April Acid Brass performance at the Queen Elizabeth Hall, London. Collaborative work ensued between Drummond, Cauty, and Deller, in which the Acid Brass rendition of their track was incorporated into a millennium-themed composition designed to mark the tenth anniversary of Drummond and Cauty's first work.

A comeback of the KLF was implied by two black-and-white full-page adverts placed in the 21 August 1997 issue of Time Out. The first proclaimed "They're Back. The Creators of Trance. The Lords of Ambient. The Kings of Stadium House. The Godfathers of Techno Metal. The Greatest Rave Band In The World. Ever! 2K. For 23 minutes Only." The second stated "'Jeremy Deller presents '1997 What The Fuck's Going On'", a reference to The JAMs' debut album 1987 (What the Fuck Is Going On?). It continued, "Jimmy Cauty and Bill Drummond invite you to a 23 minute performance during which the next 840 days of our lives will be discussed."

The Independent looked forward to the event, saying that "It was just a matter of time before Jimmy Cauty and Bill Drummond hatched another prank and put a grin back on the face of pop music." "You just ache for them to be No. 1 again ..." they said, but "One hopes they are not about to shoot themselves in the foot" because "the idea walks the tightrope between lunacy and brilliance ... the pop world's countdown to the millennium surely starts here."

== Performance ==
Two "old reprobates": The KLF came out of retirement for 23 minutes to make an appearance as 2K.

"1997 (What The Fuck's Going On?)" was performed by 2K as a one-off event at London's Barbican Arts Centre on 17 September 1997. (Note: Originally scheduled for 2 September, but postponed due to the death of Diana, Princess of Wales on 31 August; reportedly, a 2K spokesman ascribed this to the expectation that the concert would have been deprived of tabloid coverage.) The show began with a screening of This Brick, a short 35mm film of a brick made from the ashes of the K Foundation's million-pound bonfire.

The live performance was directed by Ken Campbell – who Drummond had first met in 1976 when he was recruited as the set designer for Campbell's stage production of The Illuminatus! Trilogy – and introduced by the music industry figure and pundit Tony Wilson. Drummond's creative associates Mark Manning and Gimpo appeared on stage as, respectively, "an axe-wielding "salvationist" in a vicar's collar and gold lame suit, and a shop steward character in a white coat with a megaphone". Drummond and Cauty were then unveiled as pyjama-clad, wheelchair-using pensioners with grey hair and, strapped to their foreheads, prominent horns that had been used regularly in the KLF's promotional videos. The duo wheeled around the stage in their wheelchairs, and at one point Drummond was seen plucking feathers from a dead swan. They were supported by Acid Brass playing "What Time Is Love?"; a male choir's rendition of "K Cera Cera", joined by opera singer Sally Bradshaw; the Viking Society in costume as lifeboatmen; and the politically topical Liverpool Dockers chanting "Fuck the Millennium". A press release issued by Mute/Blast First (Acid Brass' and 2K's record label) suggested that "Two elderly gentlemen, reeking of Dettol, caused havoc in their motorised wheelchairs. These old reprobates, bearing a grandfatherly resemblance to messrs Cauty and Drummond, claimed to have just been asked along." Following the performance, every audience member received a "Fuck the Millennium" T-shirt, poster, and bumper sticker in a carrier bag.

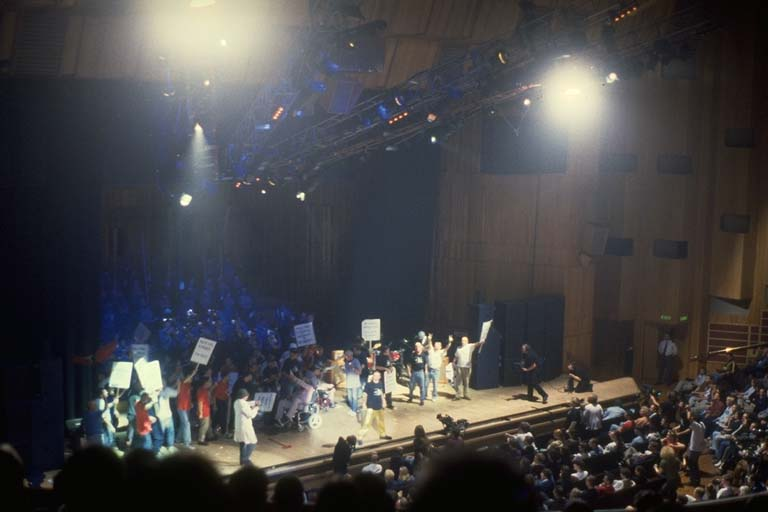
Liverpool dockers join Bill Drummond, Jimmy Cauty and Acid Brass on stage

In a comprehensive assessment, The Observer rationalised the spectacle: "They did what they always do: too many things at the same time. Their points are lost along with the plot. So, just to explain: ... Bill and Jimmy were dressed as old men as a comment on elderly pop groups making a comeback. The brass band playing house music tunes was organised by Jeremy Deller as a comment on class culture (working-class band playing working-class music). The dockers were asked along because their cause is important." The Guardian called the performance "a glorious, jaw-dropping mess", and The Times commented that "the strongest point in its favour was its brevity". Neil McCormick, a journalist from The Daily Telegraph who participated in the event at Drummond's invitation, wrote that Cauty and Drummond's latest venture was seemingly "bizarre and outrageous" but that "they appear to have, once again, struck a chord with a lot of people". Select said, "There was no press furore the next morning—merely the anticlimactic aftertaste left by 40-year-old men miming to a seven-year-old song ... 2K was unquestionably a failure."

== Composition and studio recording ==
A single, "Fuck the Millennium" was subsequently released, a studio-based recording falsely promoted as an edited version of the Barbican performance. Comparing the single with the live performance, The Times said that "On CD, things become more orthodox, though no less entertaining, comprising an acid brass version of their classic, What Time Is Love? and a young man shouting rude words."

The unedited studio recording of "Fuck the Millennium" is a 14-minute composition, a protest song based around the KLF's house music track "What Time Is Love?", drawing additionally on musical refrains and concepts from throughout Drummond and Cauty's canon. The track contains three main segued parts: a house section led by the brass band Acid Brass, a choral rendition of the English hymn "Eternal Father, Strong to Save", and a rhythmically hardened remix of "What Time Is Love? (Pure Trance Original)". The lead vocals before and after the hymn consist mainly of chants, with over one hundred instances of the word "fuck"—there are 26 instances of the word in the short "Radio Edit" alone.

"Fuck the Millennium"
A fusion of Drummond and Cauty's past works, with chants of "Fuck the Millennium". Gimpo's screams for "Bill" and "Jimmy" interrupt the opening chords of "Eternal Father, Strong to Save".

The track is opened by Gimpo screaming "It's 1997: what the fuck is going on?". There follows a brass band version of "What Time Is Love? (Pure Trance Original)", with a house rhythm added, along with samples from The JAMs' 1987 recordings "All You Need Is Love", "Don't Take Five (Take What You Want)", "Whitney Joins The JAMs" and "Burn the Bastards". Drummond leads a crowd in chanting: "Fuck the millennium! We want it now!". Among the voices singing the three verses of the hymn are keyboardist Nick Coler, Drummond and Cauty, multiple recordings of whom are overlain to simulate a congregation. Mark Manning evangelically narrates its lyrics, and between verses, Gimpo screams for "Bill!" (Drummond) and "Jimmy!" (Cauty).

Neil McCormick wrote in The Daily Telegraph that the single may be "noisy and confrontational" but that "it looks set to provide these pop situationists with another... hit, tapping into the fear and anxiety many people feel about the end of the century". Select journalist Mark Frith enthused about the track in the context of the duo's wider catalogue: "As soon as it starts you immediately remember the excitement that comes from hearing a KLF record for the first time. The original ambient house melody kicks in – and it hasn't dated a day. The chorus is given an extra kick by Acid Brass' massed ranks of horns and trumpets ... It is quite brilliant."

== K2 Plant Hire ==
Construction machinery and robed figures at the base of the envisaged "People's Pyramid"

Cauty and Drummond were (and, as of February 2020, are) directors of K2 Plant Hire Ltd, a company incorporated and registered at Companies House in 1995.

Around the time of the single's release, further full-page adverts appeared in the national press, this time asking readers "***k The Millennium: Yes/No?", with a telephone number—the "Millennium Crisis Line"—provided for voting: "If you want to fuck the millennium, press '1'. If not, press '2'." The adverts were placed by K2 Plant Hire Ltd., who duly claimed that 18,436 (89%) of respondents wished to fuck the millennium. Thus, on 31 October 1997, K2 Plant Hire announced plans to build the "Great Northern Pyramid Of The People", or "The People's Pyramid", from as many house bricks as there were British 20th century births. The company estimated that the structure would require approximately 87 millions bricks; be 150-foot (46 m)-high; and take five years to complete, all at no cost to the taxpayer. Members of the public were urged to donate bricks, with 1.5 bricks per Briton being needed to complete the project. K2 Plant Hire promised that the Pyramid "will be open to the public free of charge, 24 hours a day, 365 days a year. You will be able to do what you want with it. Climb it, paint it, polish it, eat your sandwiches on it or chip it away. It will stand for as long there is any of it left. It will promote nothing. Be sponsored by nobody. And owned by everybody."; Melody Maker noted the pointed contrast of the "intended virtues" of the People's Pyramid with "the drawbacks of the officially sponsored Millennium Dome". The Guardian noted drily that the idea "would appear to be far-fetched even by [Cauty and Drummond's] own standards" and that "planning permission might pose a problem." (Note: The Pyramid was never built, but Cauty, Drummond and K2 Plant Hire Ltd resurrected and revised the concept in 2017 after the death of Cauty's brother, Simon. The new pyramid is to be built from bricks containing human ashes; the first brick to be laid contained Simon Cauty's ashes. Jimmy Cauty emphasised that the project is serious and not a joke.)

K2 Plant Hire also contributed a short story, written by Drummond, to editor Sarah Champion's anthology Disco 2000. "'Let's Grind' or 'How K2 Plant Hire Went To Work'" is a fictional account of K2 Plant Hire's plan to demolish Stonehenge on the eve of the millennium. Drummond and Cauty reportedly tried to use K2 Plant Hire's remaining funds to bid for purchase of the ancient Rollright Stones. Psychogeographer Stewart Home alleged that despite K2 Plant Hire's bid being the highest, the owners of the monument refused to trade with the duo.

== Themes ==
Advert inviting readers to vote by phone to agree or disagree with the proposal "***k the millennium"

Drummond and Cauty's works are both highly self-referential and rife with references to Robert Shea's and Robert Anton Wilson's 1975 novel The Illuminatus! Trilogy, from which The JAMs took their name. Their 1997 work, as 2K and K2 Plant Hire, continued many of these themes. Their subversive attitude was exhibited in their attempt to undermine the pop comeback. They allegedly defaced a wall of the National Theatre the day after the Barbican performance: the graffiti "1997: What the fuck's going on?" referenced their similar graffiti of ten years earlier on the same wall of the arts establishment. The unusual show at the Barbican was typical of their previous confusing and humorous costumed appearances; moreover, the horns strapped to their foreheads were previously used in the KLF's cowl costumes. The advertising campaigns before and after the single's release resumed Drummond and Cauty's characteristic promotional tactic of cryptic, monochrome full-page adverts placed in UK national newspapers and music press.

Seafaring was a recurring element of Drummond and Cauty's output, in lyrics from Who Killed The JAMs?, The White Room and "America: What Time Is Love?", and in imagery used to illustrate the KLF's retirement press notice. Prior to entering the music business, Drummond had worked as a trawlerman. Samples of evangelists also feature in several KLF Communications recordings: the album Chill Out and the B-sides "What Time Is Love? (Virtual Reality Mix)" and "America No More". "Fuck the Millennium" was a studio track promoted as a live recording and featuring sampled crowd noise, as were the KLF's self-named "Stadium House Trilogy" of singles. The use of an English hymn is central to The JAMs' "It's Grim up North".

2K's lifespan was billed as the duration of the Barbican performance, 23 minutes. The number is given numerological significance in The Illuminatus! Trilogy. The "Fuck the Millennium" sleevenotes state that "The Justified Ancients of Mu Mu appear courtesy of The Five", a reference to the five Illuminati leaders of the novels. Drummond and Cauty took The JAMs' name from the fictional cult in Illuminatus!, wherein the fictional JAMs are long-standing enemies of the Illuminati. K2 Plant Hire's "The People's Pyramid" recalled Drummond and Cauty's "Pyramid Blaster" logo (a ghetto blaster suspended in front of a pyramid), itself a reference to the all-seeing eye icon used in Illuminatus!.

Although the references to Illuminatus! and themselves were in keeping with Drummond and Cauty's tradition, this was also in part intended to be a self-parodying dredge of the KLF's "myth". Drummond's opinions of the "rock 'n' roll comeback" were recorded by him at the time and aired in 2000: "The history of rock 'n' roll has been littered with pathetic comebacks ... No comeback has ever worked. The motivation behind the comeback has never and will never be the same as when the group or artist first crawled out of their sub-cult ... If there was fresh original talent, it is now tired and tested, only capable of flicking the nostalgia switch." Designing 2K's parody of the comeback, Drummond wrote that he and Cauty were "getting totally into the institution of 'The Comeback', drawing on the sad, pathetic nature of the whole thing, the desperation of all concerned to exploit whatever they can from the myth ..."

== After the event ==
Contemporary press reaction to 2K and their Barbican performance was mixed but mostly negative. Since then, however, Colin Paterson in The Observer held up the Barbican show as the model of a pop performance. "At one unfortunately memorable Stereophonics gig ..." the paper said, "the extent of Richard Jones' showmanship was to play his bass while standing on a rug ... this is hardly the pyjama-clad KLF, horns strapped to their heads, whizzing around the Barbican in wheelchairs with Zodiac Mindwarp in a pulpit and hundreds of sacked Liverpool dockers yelling "Fuck the millennium!" at the tops of their voices ..." Likewise, a 1999 feature on Drummond and Cauty in The Irish Times reported their millennium activities with some warmth. "As a critique of the sponsor-saturated multi-million pound Millennium Dome," the editorial ran, "the 'people's pyramid' is unsurpassed."

Recounting the exploits of 2K, and the press reaction, in his book 45 (published in the millennium year, 2000), Drummond said:

I wanted to stamp my feet and scream "But you don't understand, the whole show was about the crapness of the comeback, of blowing one's own myth. You are supposed to see that and applaud the fact that we have an incredible understanding and postmodern take on all things pop, at the same time as delivering the goods". And then I did understand. Everything was OK. The show was a success, the record stiffing at number twenty-eight in the charts was just what the doctor ordered. We had not only blown it, we had destroyed whatever remnants of credibility, bankability and myth we had left.

== Formats and track listings ==
"Fuck the Millennium" (or "***K the Millennium") was given an international single release on 13 October 1997, and as of March 2020 it remains the most recent musical work by the duo. The record was not a success in comparison to the KLF's earlier chart-topping endeavours, peaking at a number 28 in the UK Singles Chart.

All formats contained at least one version of 2K's "Fuck the Millennium" and one of Acid Brass' "What Time Is Love?". The formats and track listings are tabulated below:

Format (and countries)	Track number					
Format (and countries)	1	2	3	4	5	6
Cassette single	m	K				
CD single (France), 12" single	M	K	P			
CD single (Japan) (inc. 4 stickers, 12-page booklet)	c	M	m	K	P	O
CD single (elsewhere)	M	K	m	c		

Key

- m – "***K the Millennium" (radio edit) (4:18)
- c – "***K the Millennium" (censored radio edit) (4:18)
- M – "***K the Millennium" (13:57)
- K – "Acid Brass / What Time Is Love (Version K)" (4:33)
- P – "Acid Brass / What Time Is Love (Version P – Royal Oak Mix)" (5:28) (remixed by Pan Sonic)
- O – "Acid Brass / What Time Is Love (Original Version)" (4:39)

== Personnel (studio recording) ==
"Fuck the Millennium" and "What Time Is Love?" were written and produced by Bill Drummond and Jimmy Cauty.

- Jeremy Deller – Acid Brass concept
- The Williams Fairey Brass Band – Acid Brass performance of "What Time Is Love?", recorded by Richard Scott and conducted by Brian Hurdley. Original arrangement by Rodney Newton
- Gimpo – spoken contributions
- Mark Manning – "Reverend Bitumen Hoarfrost"'s evangelical narration
- "The National Retired Life Boat Men's Choral Society" (Jimmy Cauty, Nick Coler and Bill Drummond) – hymnal singing
- Nick Coler – Arranger and conductor
- Donald Johnson – live drumming
- Mark "Spike" Stent – mixing

Samples:

- "Kick Out the Jams" by MC5
- "Theme from Shaft" by Isaac Hayes
- Various samples from the JAMs albums 1987 (What the Fuck Is Going On?) and Who Killed The JAMs?, and the KLF's 1988 "Pure Trance Original" version of "What Time Is Love?"

Source except where stated: Sleevenotes, Blast First/Mute Records Catalogue Number BFFP 146 CDK

== Charts ==
Chart (1997)	Peak position
Hungary (Mahasz)	10
Scottish Singles Sales (Official Charts)	26
Sweden (Sverigetopplistan)	29
UK Singles (Official Charts)	28
UK Dance (Official Charts)	16
UK Indie (Official Charts)	5
