= Gimpo (disambiguation) =

Gimpo is a city in South Korea. It may also refer to:

- Gimpo Airport in Seoul, South Korea
- An alias for Alan Goodrick, associate of the band The KLF
