= Glastonbury Festival 1993 =

Music festival in England

- Locations: Worthy Farm, Pilton, Somerset, England
- Previous event: Glastonbury Festival 1992
- Next event: Glastonbury Festival 1994

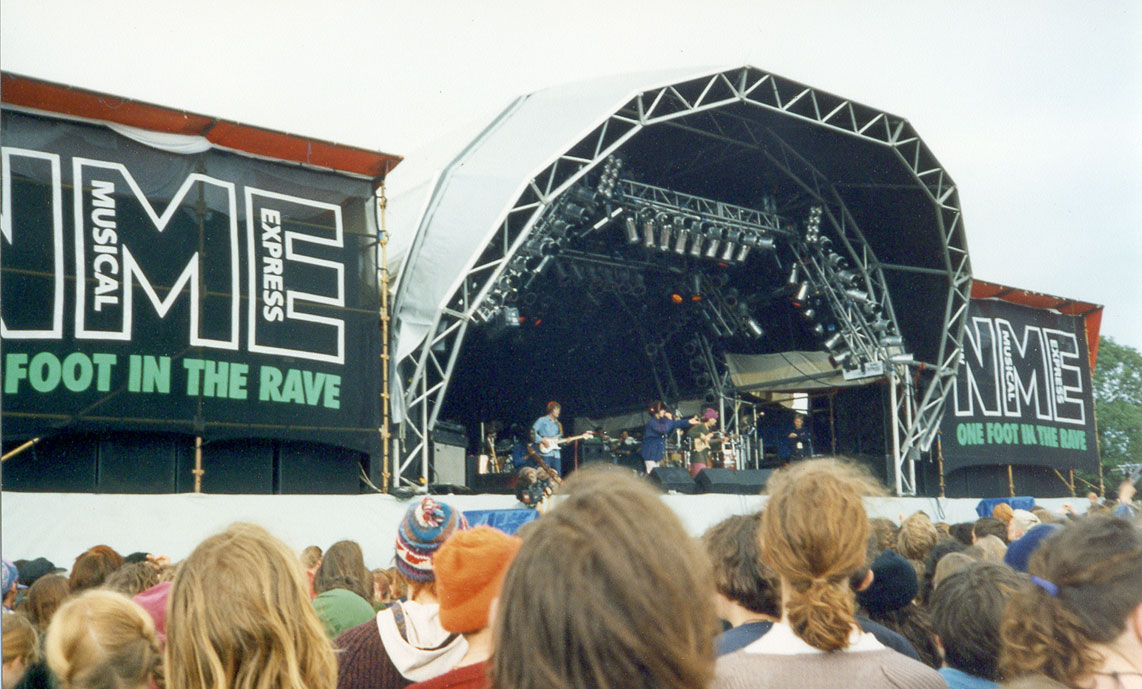
NME stage at the 1993 festival

Glastonbury Festival of Contemporary Performing Arts 1993 like 1992, was hot and dry and included performances from Paul Brady, Billy Bragg, Rolf Harris, Belly, Baaba Maal and Suede. Songs from this third album, plus a smattering of Led Zeppelin classics, made up the set-list for Robert Plant's acclaimed sunset performance on the Main Stage.

K Foundation's plans to broadcast the track K Cera Cera from the main stage at the beginning and end of every day were scuppered by festival organiser Michael Eavis because, in his words, the record was "simply dreadful". The record was instead broadcast at that year's Phoenix Festival.

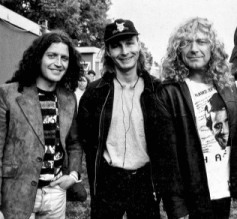
Phil Johnstone, Creem editor Dusty Wright, and Robert Plant (left to right), backstage at the Festival, 1993

== Glastonbury the Movie ==
The film, Glastonbury the Movie, was shot at the 1993 festival. The film is structured into telling the story of the festival day by day from the Friday through Saturday and finishing on the Sunday. Bands featured in the film include: Back to the Planet, Chuck Prophet, The Lemonheads, McKoy, Ozric Tentacles, Porno for Pyros, Spiritualized, Omar, Stereo MC's, Airto Moreira, and The Co-Creators. Additional performances on the DVD box-set include: The Orb, Perry Farrell, Evan Dando, Roy Harper, Ozric Tentacles, Porno for Pyros, Si Begg, Dr Didg, Charlie Creed-Miles and Dexter Fletcher and extended appearances from The Lemonheads, Omar, The Orb, Spiritualized, Roy Harper, The Verve, Perry Farrell / Porno For Pyros, Back To The Planet, Chuck Prophet, Airto Moreira, Evan Dando, Louise Goffin, Andy Guithrie, Ozric Tentacles, Kickshaw, McKoy, Si Begg, The Co-Creators, Cristian Vogel, Dr Didg, The Filberts, X-Productions, Bender, Charlie Creed-Miles, Dexter Fletcher
