= K Foundation art award =

Award given by the K Foundation to the "worst artist of the year"

The 1994 K Foundation award was an award given by the K Foundation (Bill Drummond and Jimmy Cauty) to the "worst artist of the year". The shortlist for the £40,000 K Foundation award was identical to the shortlist for the well-established but controversial £20,000 Turner Prize for the best British contemporary artist. On the evening of 23 November 1993, Rachel Whiteread was presented with the 1993 Turner Prize inside London's Tate Gallery, and the 1994 K Foundation award on the street outside.

Prior to presenting their award, the K Foundation held a private exhibit of a collection of art works entitled Money - A Major Body of Cash. The award, the exhibition and the accompanying extravagant press junket were widely reported by the media.

== Context ==
In June 1993 the newly formed K Foundation began taking out full page national press adverts. Initial advertisements were cryptic, referring to "K Time" and advising readers to "Kick out the clocks". They mentioned five-year journeys which included pop success and deep space travel and that "the sands of time are running in". There was also an advert for the K Foundation's single "K Cera Cera" which was "Available nowhere ... no formats" and which was not planned for release until world peace was established.

The K Foundation's "Abandon all art" press advertisement

There was a change of direction with the fourth advert which appeared on 14 August 1993, reading: "ABANDON ALL ART NOW. Major rethink in progress. Await further announcements." The next ad (28 August 1993) read: "It has come to our attention that you did not abandon all art now. Further direct action is thus necessary. The K Foundation announce the 'mutha of all awards', the 1994 K Foundation award for the worst artist of the year." It then went on to detail how a shortlist of four artists had been chosen, and that they would be exhibited in the Tate Gallery.

One of the first newspaper pieces about the K Foundation appeared in The Guardian the following Monday, correctly pointing out that the shortlist and exhibition were actually for the 1993 Turner Prize, the controversial £20,000 annual award given by the UK art establishment to the best young contemporary artist, but assuming that the K Foundation prize was a hoax. "As for the K Foundation", the newspaper wrote, "it stands unmasked as the current performing face of those cherished old friends of pop pranksterdom, Bill Drummond and Jimmy Cauty", formerly known as The KLF. In September, the organisers of the Turner Prize responded publicly that "It proves the validity of our prize that somebody would take so much trouble to set up this award".

The Foundation's next advert invited the general public to vote for the worst artist, either by going to the exhibition and using their critical faculties or by letting their inherent prejudices come to the fore. The final advert summarised the whole campaign, asked some questions back to the people that had written to them, and explained that the winner of the K Foundation award would be announced in a TV advert during the live Turner Prize coverage on Channel 4 television.

On 20 November 1993, The Economist reported on the K Foundation prize and placed it in context. "Every autumn for the past ten years, an increasingly bad-tempered squabble has raged between, on the one hand, many of Britain's art critics and its popular media, and on the other, its avant-garde "establishment," the small coterie of art historians, curators, and dealers who control the Turner prize." Predicting that Rachel Whiteread, creator of the controversial sculpture House, would win both awards, the magazine said that, if it were so, "the vast numbers of people who equate contemporary art with rubbish will, yet again, feel vindicated."

The first of the Foundation's TV adverts. In the Village Voice, art critic Jerry Saltz called the K Foundation "a group of self-styled art police".

The K Foundation's television adverts on the evening of 23 November 1993 explained that the Foundation were currently "amending the history of art" at a secret location. No mention of the alternative award was made in the post-Turner Prize studio discussion. The K Foundation reportedly pre-announced Rachel Whiteread as their winner at some time before the Turner Prize winner was announced; at 9.30pm, live on television, the Turner Prize was awarded to the same artist. Whiteread reluctantly collected her K Foundation winnings at just past 11pm, saying, "sarcastically, 'What an honour.'"

Drummond claimed the advertising campaign cost £250,000. The television advertisements cost £20,000, an amount which Scotland on Sunday said was "carefully chosen to match the value of the Turner prize", the newspaper adding that "Copies of the invoices were supplied as evidence." Each press advert cost between £5,000 and £15,000.

== The Amending of Art History ==
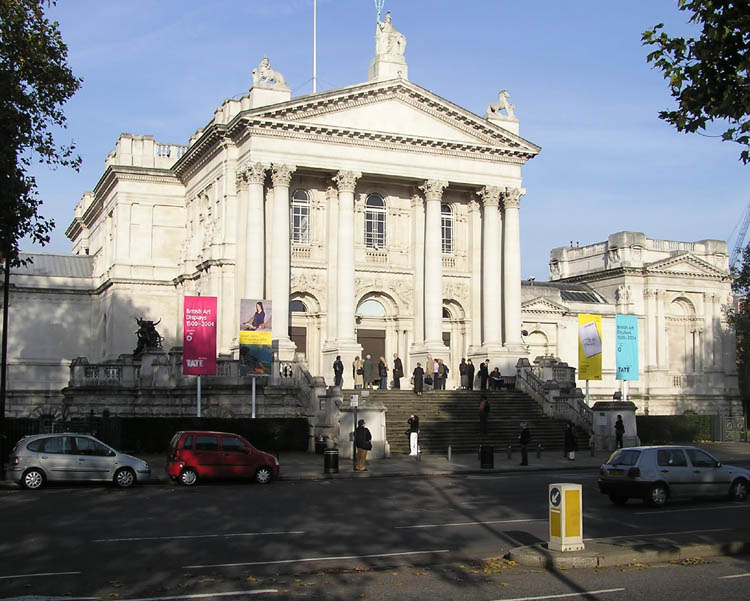
The Tate Gallery, scene of the Turner Prize and K Foundation awards

25 witnesses - including art critics, journalists, music industry figures and artists - were invited to participate in the Foundation's "Amending of art history". They were driven in a convoy of white limousines, led by a gold limo, to Heston Service Station where they were handed a press release and £1650 in crisp new £50 notes. The accompanying press release stated that 25 × £1600 collectively made up the £40000 K Foundation prize, and that the extra £50 was for the witness to verify its authenticity by spending it. The witnesses were dressed in fluorescent orange hard hats and safety jackets.

The convoy proceeded to a field patrolled by two orange-painted K Foundation Saracen armoured cars, driven by Drummond and Cauty, broadcasting the K Foundation's "K Cera Cera" and ABBA's "Money Money Money". Silver-bearded "Mr Ball", the K Foundation's compere, directed the witnesses to nail their wad of money to a board inside a gilt frame, to assemble the K Foundation's prize. Some of the witnesses pocketed all or some of their wad, and the prize money was, according to Danny Kelly, some £9000 short. Mr Ball also directed the witnesses to "view the art": One million pounds in £50 notes, nailed to a large framed board. This was the K Foundation's first art work, Nailed To The Wall, "the first of a series of K Foundation art installations that will also include one million pounds in a skip, one million pounds on a table and several variants on the theme of Tremendous Amounts Of Folding".

Collectively, the K Foundation's money-as-art works were titled Money: A Major Body Of Cash, "seven pieces, all involving various amounts of cash nailed to, tied to or simply standing on inanimate objects". Nailed To The Wall had a reserve price of £500,000, half the face value of the cash used in its construction, which Scotland on Sunday's reporter Robert Dawson Scott was "fairly confident... really was £1 million [in cash]". The catalogue entry for the artwork stated: "Over the years the face value will be eroded by inflation, while the artistic value will rise and rise. The precise point at which the artistic value will overtake the face value is unknown. Deconstruct the work now and you double your money. Hang it on a wall and watch the face value erode, the market value fluctuate, and the artistic value soar. The choice is yours."

Rachel Whiteread had already been notified of her "victory" but had refused to accept the prize or allow the K Foundation to use her name. The motorcade left the site of the amending of art-history and headed back to London, for a showdown with Whiteread on the steps of the Tate. When she again refused to accept the money, the K Foundation explained that it would be burnt. With the crowd of now very drunk witnesses looking on, a masked K Foundation operative (Gimpo) fumbled with matches and lighter fluid. At the last moment Rachel Whiteread emerged from the Tate and accepted the money, stating that she would give it as grants to needy artists.

== Media and art-world reaction ==
A huge amount of press publicity ensued, with all the major newspapers and press organisations reporting that Whiteread had won both awards. Media reaction to the K Foundation award was mixed. David Mills wrote in The Times that The K Foundation's campaign was "tiresome", and he asked "Doesn't it strike anyone as odd that a group of people who made their money with such artistic endeavours as a disco-version of the Dr Who theme should be suggesting that contemporary art was somehow more fatuous than that?"

Whiteread's advert in Art Monthly

Rachel Whiteread had an advertisement printed in the British magazine, Art Monthly, in which she outlined her plan to donate £10,000 to Shelter and distribute the remainder in grants to 10 needy artists. In the advertisement Whiteread stated that she "does not agree with the K Foundation's aims or methods"; the advertisement was in a similar style to the K Foundation ads, with stark white text on a black background.

Defending Whiteread, Lord Palumbo told The Guardian that: "Talent at the highest level attracts derision. We must let the artist fail." Scottish sculptor David Mach opined to Scotland on Sunday that "They're just a bunch of silly buggers. It's good to see money going from a bunch of silly buggers to an artist who is going to make good use of it. What's that saying about a fool and his money...?" John Bellany, on the other hand, said that "The emotional, artistic side of [his] nature... admire[d] the audacity and imagination, challenging art and the art manipulators. The rational side of me asks, is this the most expensive art publicity stunt this century, and for whom?"

Whiteread's agent Karsten Schubert said, "The whole affair was a non-event. They achieved nothing and they were left looking like real prats." Peter Chater, a director of Schubert's agency concurred; he called Drummond and Cauty "cowards". "It was obviously a publicity stunt. What sort of statement they were trying to make I don't know. If it was anything to do with the relationship between art and money it was pretty crass. The KLF made a fortune from a couple of successful singles. Artists aren't in that position. Threatening to set light to £40,000 is pretty obscene." Former Factory Records boss Tony Wilson applauded the group, however. "The K Foundation is a very peculiar avant garde group whose ideas are as valid as anything the Turner people do," he told NME. "Since when has there been laws governing what constitutes art, or an artistic statement? OK, so a lot of people don't understand what Bill and Jimmy are trying to say, but how many people know exactly what Rachel Whiteread's trying to say with her art?"

Modern Review art critic John O'Reilly, another of the K Foundation's witnesses, said: "The whole point of the K Foundation is its anonymity. There's no origin, just a Circulation of data and concepts. There is no master plan, no grand narrative." O'Reilly also "[enjoyed the] sense of waste and sacrifice involved".

Miranda Sawyer, who attended the presentation, found special interest in a subsidiary incident during the evening of the prize ceremonies: the theft of money by several of the other invited witnesses: "All the feelings of power and powerlessness that money can bring were fairly summarised with these thefts - it must have turned out better than the K Foundation could have hoped if the examination of cash, art and associated feelings was their point." Sawyer named "Britart" figure Carl Freedman as one of those who had taken the money, and reported that "He found the event funny, not offensive (you would too if you walked off with £1,600!), but thought the point had been made before."

Writer and "underground art historian" Stewart Home was viciously supportive of the K Foundation. "The avant-garde wasn't to be seen at the Turner Prize gathering, it was to be found among that select band of individuals who'd organised the K Foundation's attack on the smug complacency of the arts establishment.... 'dignitaries' such as Lord Polumbo were revealed as buffoons. While Polumbo ranted about the dunces who attack cultural innovations, his rhetoric showed him to be a complete idiot — several people immediately pointed out that he was unable to correctly name Van Gogh's art dealer brother. Likewise, Polumbo claimed that there are no monuments erected to critics and presented himself as a champion of progressive culture, while ignoring the fact that it was critics who picked the winner of the prize he was awarding. It is the K Foundation, rather than Whiteread, who represent a vital and innovative strand within contemporary culture. Their work is simultaneously a critique and a celebration of 'consumer capitalism'."

An NME piece on 20 November 1993 was also highly supportive of the K Foundation. "The nearest parallel to the K Foundation donation would be The Beatles' grandiose plans for Apple Corps", they said. "But where Apple handed out money willy-nilly to little end and failed to achieve anything more than get some hippies stoned and put up some nice posters about war being over if you want it, Drummond and Cauty have found a specific target - the relationship between art, money and the critical establishment- and attacked it. By actually offering £40,000 to the artist who produces the duffest piece of work, they've simultaneously sent up the whole thing and proved their integrity the hard way."

The Face magazine's witness, Cliff Jones, wrote that "The accusation that this is a tiresome Situationist gag with a whoopee cushion pay-off belittles the K Foundation's distracted message. They are not mocking any of the artists involved in the Turner or their work so much as the whole tired institution of awards themselves.... By telling us to "use our critical faculties or our innate prejudice" to vote, the Ks are asking: "Who decides who decides?""

The Independent's witness, David Lister, was less impressed. "Last night's highly eccentric mystery tour by the K Foundation probably said more about the wealth that can be accumulated from two number one hit records than it did about any resurgence of Dadaism", he said.

The Guardian said that Jimmy Cauty, "[as the artist] responsible for a best-selling Athena poster of the Hobbit ... can justly say he has adorned more walls than any of the Turner nominees"; and added: "A grand deflation of the pretensions of the wealthy art elite is an aim that has drawn approval from sections of the art world and philistines who find 'installations' of knotted rope or beds covered in rice curiously unmoving.... The joke may yet prove to be at the expense of the Turner." In a separate piece, the newspaper implied that the K Foundation had hit their perceived target with some success:

The abiding image of this year's Turner Prize will not be the poignant, graffiti-scarred hulk of Rachel Whiteread's House, marooned in the swirling dereliction of the East End, nor even Vong Phaophanit's gently undulating rice dunes inside the Tate.

The picture that really grabbed hold of the zeitgeist, and which will stay in the memory long after the dust of demolition settles, was the grim sight of Peter Palumbo, handing Whiteread her cheque at the Tate on Tuesday night. His face white and sweaty, vainly trying to appear martial, he looked for all the world like the late Salvador Allende in his tin helmet, clutching his assault rifle on the steps of the presidential palace as Pinochet's tanks swept him from power....

Perhaps the Turner Prize could handle routine local authority philistinism, but the heavy-handed Magic Christian mockery of the KLF, the group of rock biz pranksters who doubled the prize money with an award for what they called the worst artist of the four on the shortlist, seemed to be too much for the Prize's fragile sense of purpose. The equilibrium of its greatest defender had cracked.

Whiteread's sculpture, House, was demolished, as had been planned from its inception, on 11 January 1994.

== Later analysis ==
In a piece published in 2006, The Sunday Times quoted author James F. English's description of The K Foundation's Art Award as "hostile philanthropy". Sunday Times writer Bryan Appleyard added that the "K Foundation's witty exploitations of artistic greed ... are essential aspects of the prize itself. They promote the prize, reassure the organisers that, culturally speaking, they are in the thick of it and console the artists with evidence that their work provokes strong reactions. More importantly, for English, such conflicts demonstrate the autonomous nature of the event. These prizes should not be seen as any real or lasting judgment about art, but rather as things in themselves."

Some years after the award, Bill Drummond attempted to explain the K Foundation's motives, as he now saw them:

Most of the people who wrote about what we did, and the TV programme that was made about it, made a mistake. I was only able to articulate it to myself afterwards with hindsight. They thought we were using our money to make a statement about art, and really what we were doing was using our art to make a statement about money. Having arrived at that formula, I'm probably manipulating everything we did to fit into the theory, but we were just getting up in the morning and getting on the phone with each other and saying, fucking hell! So at some points we thought we were attacking the art establishment then we were saying, no that's not what this is about.

== Burning ==
The K Foundation's art campaign, Money: A Major Body Of Cash, failed to attract major gallery interest so, on 23 August 1994, Drummond and Cauty disposed of their one million pounds in an alternate fashion: they burnt it on the Scottish island of Jura. In an interview with Drummond, Cauty and Gimpo, Gimpo admitted to harbouring guilt about the million pounds burning; that if he'd burnt Whiteread's £40,000 the million pounds burning would never have happened. "I should have burnt it. I had petrol all over the £40,000... We were due to wait until eleven o'clock until she came out, but we were told to wait another two minutes... [then] Rachel Whiteread came running out. She just grabbed the money and dragged it over the fence." Carl Freedman also wished they'd burnt Whiteread's money. "It would have been brilliant.... It would have been just totally outrageous. People would have been falling out of their-chairs, saying. 'I can't believe they just burned £40,000'".

== See also ==
- K Foundation Burn a Million Quid
- List of European art awards
