= Glastonbury Festival 1992 =

Music festival in England

- Locations: Worthy Farm, Pilton, Somerset, England
- Previous event: Glastonbury Festival 1990
- Next event: Glastonbury Festival 1993

Following the 1991 fallow year, an expanded festival returned for the Glastonbury Festival of Contemporary Performing Arts 1992, and this proved a great success. 1992 was the first year that the new age travellers were not initially allowed onto the site free, and a sturdier fence was designed. This success was carried through to 1993 which, like 1992, was hot and dry.

The Levellers first performed at the Glastonbury Festival in 1992, before headlining act on The Pyramid Stage in 1994.

== Pyramid stage ==
Friday	Saturday	Sunday
Carter USM; The Levellers; Fishbone; Television; The Breeders; The Blue Aeroplanes; The Senseless Things; Runrig; Kirsty MacColl; Hugh Cornwell	Shakespear's Sister; Lou Reed; James (replacing Morrissey who cancelled); The Fall; The House of Love; The Saw Doctors; Ocean Colour Scene; Joan Armatrading; Chris Whitley; Mazlyn Jones	Youssou N'Dour; Maxi Priest; Tom Jones; Van Morrison; Buddy Guy; Richard Thompson; Billy Bragg and The Redstars; K Passa; Glastonbury Town Band

== NME stage ==
Friday	Saturday	Sunday
Primal Scream; The Orb; Gary Clail; Jah Wobble; Flowered Up; Dr Phibes & the House of Wax Equations; Natural Life; The Moonflowers; Radical Dance Faction; Back To The Planet; Senser; Fat Dinosaur	The Shamen; Curve; Ozric Tentacles; Lush; Cud; Thousand Yard Stare; Catherine Wheel; Midway Still; The Sandkings; Th' Faith Healers; The Stairs; Bates Motel	808 State; Ned's Atomic Dustbin; Blur; Spiritualized; P J Harvey; The Frank and Walters; Kitchens of Distinction; The Family Cat; The Real People; The Belltower; Dodgy; Strangelove

== Jazz stage ==
Friday	Saturday	Sunday
Lonnie Liston Smith; Olodum; Jim Mullen Quartet; Steve Williamson's That Suss Was Us; Nik Turner; Steve Arguelles; Joe Louis Walker; Space Waves; Soul In Motion	Kaoma; Chapter And The Verse; African Jazz Pioneers; Distant Cousins; Adrian Utley and Tammy Payne; Blurt; Martin Speake Quartet; Co Creators; Like Young	Negrocan; The Family Stand; Galliano; Dirty Dozen; Mouth Music; Secret Society; Chance Element; Magoma; Domino Club
