= Disco 2000 (anthology) =

Anthology edited by Sarah Champion

- Author: Sarah Champion (editor)
- Language: English
- Genre: Science fiction
- Publisher: Sceptre
- Publication date: 1998
- Publication place: United Kingdom
- Media type: Print (paperback)
- Pages: 364 pp
- ISBN: 0-340-70771-2

Disco 2000 is a 1998 anthology of short fiction edited by music journalist Sarah Champion. The stories in the collection are set in the last hours of 1999, and while the authors featured are largely known for their science fiction work, not every story is strictly of that genre. The collection is a follow-up to Champion's previous collection, Disco Biscuits, which took the British club scene as its topic.

== Contents ==
=== "Witnessing the Millennium" by Pat Cadigan ===
People around the world are inexplicably vanishing \- and rumour is that the only way to survive is to be seen at all times. As New Year's Ever partygoers fight to be seen on TV cameras around the world, the narrator instead decides to sit alone on a London park bench. He is accosted first by a group of drunk homeless men, then by a TV news crew, leading to a fight that knocks him to the ground. When he recovers to find everyone gone and only the news crew's equipment left, he realises that people are somehow being pulled into the cameras themselves.

=== "English Astronaut" by Nicholas Blincoe ===
Harry, an Englishman, who has seemingly become unhinged by a life of non-stop, round-the-world partying, travels to Jerusalem, believing that if he plays Karen Carpenter's "Calling Occupants of Interplanetary Craft" as the new millennium begins, he will ascend into the Heavens. He manages to seize the Dome of the Rock, but is fatally shot by security forces. As he dies, he does indeed feel his spirit moving on.

=== "I'm a Policeman" by Grant Morrison ===
In London, world-famous author and marketing guru Starorzewski frets about the launch of soft drink brand Cloaca-Cola while hedonistically partying in Buckingham Palace. As social order breaks down in the face of increasingly self-recursive media, he pulls off a major stunt - launching gallons of the filth-laden liquid on the citizens below, so that it crystallises into snow. (This mirrors an issue from the comic book The Invisibles, scripted by Morrison and entitled "And We're All Policemen" , which is also set at a turn-of-an-epoch party. The protagonist's surname in "I'm a Policeman", Starorzewski, is shared by The Invisibles' King Mob.)

=== "Identity" by Jonathan Brook ===
James, an increasingly violent and confused psychopath, stalks the streets of London. A vat-grown human, he has DNA from all of humanity embedded in his cells, allowing him to psychically access memories and experiences from all over the globe. The scientists who created him try - and fail - to stop him from mating, an action that causes reality itself to unspool.

=== "Vine of the Soul" by Poppy Z. Brite ===
Zach and Trevor, an American couple, celebrate New Year's Eve in Amsterdam, culminating in drug-fuelled hallucinatory sex in a friend's home. The story features characters from Brite's second novel, Drawing Blood.

=== "The Millennium Loop" by Charlie Hall ===
A pair of nomadic DJs hoping to make their way across Australia for the start of the new millennium find themselves stranded in the wilderness. Desperate, they contact an email address found on the back of a button they picked up in their travels. Down the line comes a voice, seemingly recorded by one of them at a time unknown, warning them not to be trapped in the "millennium loop". As they continue their travels, they pick up an old man who reveals the grim truth: that the world is forever caught in a loop, never leaving the second millennium, always resetting at the end of January 31. Hoping to eventually break free, they leave a message for their past selves and drive on into the loop.

=== "A Short Archeology of the Chemical Age" by Doug Hawes ===
Counting down to midnight at a Manchester house party, a group of friends come up on MDMA in time for the new year.

=== "Mama Told Me Not to Come" by Paul Di Filippo ===
Loren's plan to commit suicide at a friend's house party is derailed by a meeting with the god Bacchus who gifts him with a series of magical artefacts, including a party horn that will let him leap to any shindig in the multiverse - with the warning that if anyone so transported steps too far from a party, they will explode in a miniature big bang. Loren then skips through the Mad Hatter's tea party from Alice in Wonderland, a Roman orgy, and a 1960s bed in, acquiring several companions along the way. He jettisons one of them - who is trying to kill him - at a dinosaur "party", causing an explosion that means extinction for the beasts, and the group finally end up in his friend's flat 20 years later. His fears that the end of the party will cause them to detonate are unfounded, however: the UK, under a new revolutionary government, is now in a state of 24/7 partying.

=== "Gigantic" by Steve Aylett ===
After accidentally glimpsing the true nature of the universe, Professor Skychum attempts to warn the world of an impending mass disaster. Unfortunately he must compete for airtime with a bunch of genuine crazies, who are made to recount their crackpot ideas as TV entertainment. Eventually his prophecy plays out: "spaceships" appear above major cities and government buildings and begin to drop billions of dead bodies - the victims of those governments and institutions - onto them. Skychum, watching the corpses fall on New York from the safety of an out-of-town train line, remarks: "Many happy returns."

=== "Let's Grind, or How K2 Plant Hire Ltd Went to Work" by Bill Drummond ===
Drummond recounts how he and other members of The KLF planned to string up the bodies of two slaughtered cows from a pylon as part of a Discordian art prank at a time when the UK was reeling from mad cow disease. However, after acquiring the two animals, Drummond and crew lose their faith in the project and cancel it. With the end of the millennium approaching, they hatch a new scheme, to grind down the Rollright Stones, mix them with building materials and shave them into perfect cubes that will better withstand the vagaries of time. The story ends with them setting off to work. This story is connected to 2K's Fuck the Millennium project.

=== "Radiant Flower of The Divine Heavens" by Martin Millar ===
Fetish model and club queen Radiant Flower of the Divine Heavens, having stolen a prize flower that will only bloom at the millennium, fends off admirers as she frets over the plant's ailing health and its effect on her home's feng shui. One of those spurned admirers steals it and presents it to her arch-nemesis, club doyenne Venus Beuticia, who destroys it in front of the young woman at a New Year's Eve BDSM party. Radiant Flower pretends that she only stole it to present it to Venus, gaining the upper hand, then resolves to just use some hedge clippings to fix her feng shui instead.

=== "Game On" by Helen Mead ===
A group of friends gather on the island of an enigmatic party planner, Domenico, to welcome in the new year with food, fun, drink and drugs. Nick, one of their member, is paralysed by gloom, but is transformed by the experience and granted a new lease on life by their host's magnanimity.

=== "Piece of My Mind" by Courttia Newland ===
In Liverpool, a group of youths prepare to party into the new year, but two of their number have their own plans: Little Stacey plans to make some cash selling drugs at the city's biggest club bash, while reclusive graffiti artist Nemo plots his biggest and best work yet on the wall of a BBC studio. Stacey's dealing goes awry when he is mugged at knifepoint in the club and Nemo's mural is interrupted first by his friend Vanessa, who demands to tag along, and then by the police. Stacey is saved by bouncers, and Nemo and Vanessa manage to evade the police. Both young men see in the New Year in the arms of the women they love, having put their bad habits behind them.

=== "Is Everybody Here?" by Douglas Rushkoff ===
A party host explains in monologue his philosophy on life, pain and salvation, as it emerges he is a cult leader talking his followers into committing suicide as a way to escape the cycle of rebirth and death.

=== "Pavlovs Bitch and Yoga Cow Reach 2000 " by Tanya Glyde ===
Sometime lovers Bitch and Yoga Cow take on a drugged-up romp across London in search of raw steaks - tricky, since an epidemic of meat madness has led to meat products being banned. After failing to find anything useful at a couple of parties, they break into a secret meat locker beneath Harrods using a grenade, then take the meat to their friend Mack, who has been institutionalised. As Mack and Yoga Cow enjoy the meat at midnight, Bitch murders them and slinks away - possibly a victim of the disease herself.

=== "Retoxicity" by Steve Beard ===
In a cyberpunk-inflected London torn apart by conflict between the Corporation of London and billionaire Hong Kong investors, a mercenary infiltrates a New Year's Eve party being held in the ruins of Battersea Power Station by a cult leader. A paramilitary force is sent in to violently quell the party, but the leader defies all logic by apparently ascending - as promised - to a higher plane. (This is an excerpt from Beard's novel, Digital Leatherette.)

=== "Crunch" by Neal Stephenson ===
In Manila, a man preoccupied by the complexities of ballroom dancing ritualistically makes and consumes breakfast before being ferried on to an unknown future. )This is an excerpt from Stephenson's novel Cryptonomicon.)

=== "Dali's Clocks" by Robert Anton Wilson ===
Multiple parallel worlds collide after a Discordian named Simon the Walking Glitch organises an anti-millennium party for people who don't like the Christian calendar. Members of three alternate timelines - a giant superintelligent red ant, a giant superintelligent black ant, and a normal-sized fairly intelligent human named Abdel - converge on Simon's reality. The tangled timelines unweave after the red ants devour all of the world's Christians, which in turn leads to a substantial uptick in world peace.

=== "Fire at the Ativan Factory" by Douglas Coupland ===
Wyatt, an unhappily married special effects guru, is working through the New Year's Eve celebrations, musing on his inability to impregnate his wife and his addiction to Ativan when he snaps and decides he wants to flush not just the drug, but the whole of the 20th century, out of his system. He goes home and handcuffs himself to a railing on his balcony, throws away all his means of escape, and begins a truly terrible comedown as the millennium ends.

== Tie-in album ==
A companion album, also entitled Disco 2000 and released in 1998, features, according to the book's afterword, "futuristic music for the end of the millennium, especially recorded as a companion to this book." The album includes contributions from, among others, two of the writers featured in the book, Bill Drummond and Grant Morrison.
