= House (sculpture) =

Sculpture by Rachel Whiteread

House won Rachel Whiteread the 1993 Turner Prize and the 1994 K Foundation award.

House was a temporary public sculpture by British artist Rachel Whiteread, on Grove Road, Bethnal Green, in the London Borough of Tower Hamlets. It was completed on 25 October 1993 and demolished eleven weeks later on 11 January 1994. The work won Whiteread the Turner Prize for best young British artist and the K Foundation art award for the worst British artist in November 1993.

== Background ==
Whiteread had previously exhibited her sculpture Ghost, a plaster cast of the four living room walls inside an abandoned Victorian townhouse, at the Chisenhale Gallery in 1990. House was conceived as a similar work on a larger scale, encompassing not just a single room but an entire house. The work was commissioned by Artangel, and sponsored by Beck's Beer and Tarmac Structural Repairs. It was intended that the selected house would have been already scheduled for demolition and that the work would be temporary, but the structure had to be free-standing so it would be visible from all sides.

After some initial discussions in 1991 and 1992 when other locations in London were considered, a Victorian terraced house in East London was selected for the work, and a temporary lease was granted by the local council of 193 Grove Road, in Mile End, E3, near the old Roman road from London to Colchester. The house was part of a terrace on a road where some of the buildings had been destroyed by bombing in the Second World War and later replaced by prefabricated dwellings.

By the 1990s, the area had a diverse social mix, with churches from three different denominations nearby. The local buildings comprised a mixture of Victorian terraces and villas, with high-rise blocks of flats from the 1960s and later, and the development at Canary Wharf was visible in the distance. The area was in the middle of an extensive redevelopment, and the local authorities decided to demolish the terrace to create a new park beside Roman Road and Grove Road. Sydney Gale, the last residential occupier of 193 Grove Road, opposed its demolition, and continued to live in the house while the remainder of the terrace was demolished, leaving his house and the ones to either side, but he was eventually persuaded to move out.

== Creation ==
The work was a concrete cast of the inside of the entire three-storey house, basement, ground floor and first floor, including stairs and bay windows, but not the roof space. After Whiteread took possession of the building in August 1993, new foundations were created to support the new concrete. Internal structures such as sinks and cupboards were removed, holes in the walls filled and the windows covered, to prepare a continuous internal surface that could be sprayed with a debonding agent, then a 5-centimetre (2 in) layer of 'locrete' coloured light grey, and then a final 25-centimetre (10 in) layer of concrete reinforced with steel mesh. The builders left through a hole in the roof which was then sealed, and the external brick-built structure was removed.

The casting took place from August to October 1993, and the work was opened to the public on 25 October 1993. Being so heavy, the work was exhibited at the original site of the house, on the edge of a new public park, Wennington Green, and beside Grove Road. The other houses in the terrace had already been demolished by Tower Hamlets London Borough Council.

== Reception ==
House became a popular visitor attraction, with thousands of visitors per day. Graffiti was later added on one side reading "Wot for?" with the enigmatic reply "Why not!". It received rave reviews from critics. Andrew Graham-Dixon of The Independent describing it as "one of the most extraordinary and imaginative public sculptures created by an English artist this century". However, it was described as a monstrosity by Eric Flounders, the chair of the local council. (Note: Flounders reviled the sculpture as "utter rubbish" and "a little entertainment for the gallery-going classes of Hampstead".) A petition demanding it remain permanently received 3,300 signatures. A motion for its retention was moved in the House of Commons by the local Bow and Poplar member of parliament Mildred Gordon in November 1993.

The work won Whiteread the Turner Prize in November 1993, but the council confirmed the decision to demolish it the same day, passed by the casting vote of the chairman of the planning committee. The controversy was compared to that over the public sculptures by Jacob Epstein and Eric Gill, with the fate of the work recalling Richard Serra's Tilted Arc in New York. At the same time as winning the Turner Prize, Whiteread won the K Foundation art award for the worst example of British art, which came with prize money of £40,000 – double that given by the Turner Prize. Whiteread was hesitant to accept their award at first, but the money would have been burnt had she not. She donated half of the money to the housing charity Shelter, and the remainder in grants to young artists.

The thin structure of House was demolished within two hours on 11 January 1994. Joe Cullen, the operator of the earthmover which destroyed the work, told the assembled press that "It's not art, it's a lump of concrete." Whiteread, who was present at the destruction, stated that it was upsetting, but was determined not to show her emotion publicly. (Note: Whiteread said of the demolition "People were coming up to me and sticking their cameras in my face and saying 'Aren't you going to cry?' Well, I probably will cry, but I'll do it on my own.") Nothing remains of the artwork.

== Ebbsfleet Landmark ==
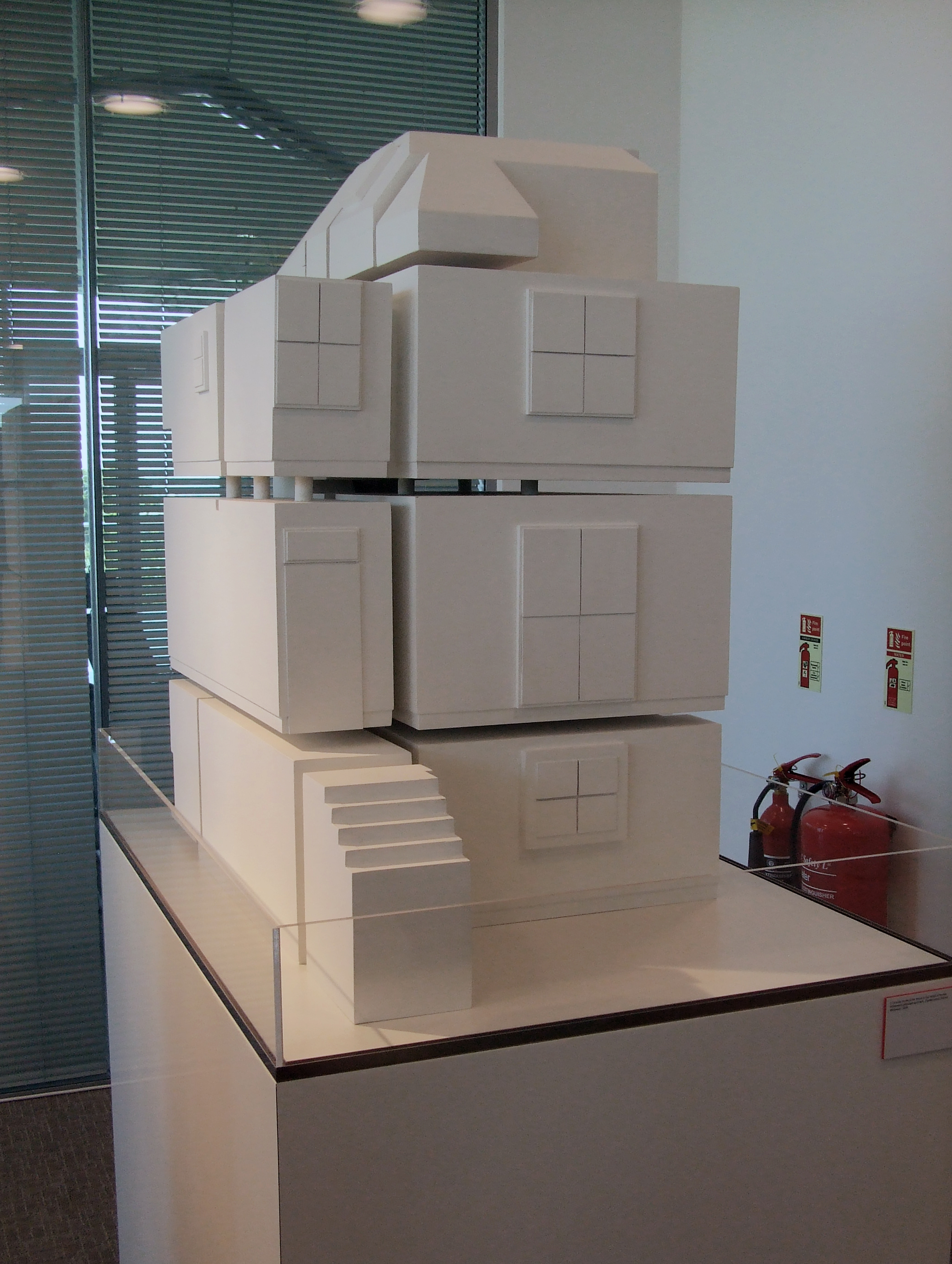
Scale model of Whiteread's submission for the Ebbsfleet Landmark project

In 2008 Whiteread proposed a variant of her House artwork for the Ebbsfleet Landmark project. The project would have been based on her own family home, and would be what she described as "a monument to everybody's homes".

Her submission reached a shortlist along with Mark Wallinger, Richard Deacon, Christopher le Brun, and Daniel Buren, and Wallinger's White Horse at Ebbsfleet was ultimately chosen.
