= Glastonbury Festival 1990 =

Music festival in England

- Locations: Worthy Farm, Pilton, Somerset, England
- Previous event: Glastonbury Festival 1989
- Next event: Glastonbury Festival 1992

Glastonbury Festival of Contemporary Performing Arts 1990 was attended by 70,000 with tickets costing £38.

Following the 1990 festival, violence flared between security guards and new age travellers in what became known as "The Battle of Yeoman's Bridge".

Eavis was also facing increasing battles from locals over the festival, with no festival taking place in 1991. Both pressures are captured in the 1992 Channel 4 documentary Showdown at Glastonbury.

Glastonbury 90 is a 1999 live album release of a 1990 concert by Hawkwind.

== Pyramid stage ==
Friday	Saturday	Sunday
Happy Mondays; Jesus Jones; Adamski; The Neville Brothers; Green on Red; Lush; Pale Saints; Galaxie 500	The Cure; Sinéad O'Connor; De La Soul; James; Del Amitri; Julian Cope (No show); Avalon Stompers	Ladysmith Black Mambazo; Aswad; Ry Cooder & David Lindley; Flaco Jiménez; Deacon Blue; Hothouse Flowers; Mano Negra; World Party

Archaos performed on top of the Pyramid after the Friday and Saturday night sets.
