= Acid Brass =

British musical collaboration

Acid Brass is a musical collaboration between Turner-Prize-winning artist Jeremy Deller and the Williams Fairey Brass Band. The project is based on fusing the music of a traditional brass band with acid house and Detroit techno.

== History ==
Acid Brass began in 1997 as a collaboration between Deller, the Stockport-based Fairey Brass Band and Rodney Newton who created all the brass arrangements. Deller saw a connection between the two apparently disparate genres, viewing them as "two authentic forms of folk art rooted in specific communities". The music has since been taken all over the world, and was performed by the Fairey Band before a London crowd of 25,000 in July 2005.

In 1997, The KLF co-founder Bill Drummond heard Acid Brass performing The KLF's "What Time Is Love?" as part of their encore. Consequently, Acid Brass collaborated with The KLF (appearing in their alternative personae as The Justified Ancients of Mu-Mu) on a track titled "Fuck the Millennium", incorporating Acid Brass' cover of "What Time Is Love?". The track was released as a single under the moniker 2K.

The track "The Groove that won't stop" was played over the end titles to the 2010 movie "Four Lions".

The Fairey Band still plays regular Acid Brass gigs at major music festivals in the UK and abroad, and in 2011 issued a new Acid Brass CD.

In June 2024, Deller brought Acid Brass to the streets of Melbourne, as part of the 2024 RISING: festival, with local brass bands including Merri-bek City Band, Glenferrie Brass, Victorian State Youth Brass Band, Dandenong Band, and Western Brass.

== Albums ==
The original Acid Brass album was released on 3 November on the Blast First label and featured versions of dance classics such as A Guy Called Gerald's "Voodoo Ray", Rhythm Is Rhythm's "Strings of Life" and 808 State's "Pacific 202". The original studio album was recorded at the BBC North's sound studios on Oxford Road in Manchester, whilst a live version was recorded on 1 March 1997 at the Liverpool Institute for Performing Arts.

A new collection entitled Acid Brass 2 - In Yer Face! was recorded in January 2011. It consists of 10 arrangements by Richard Rock of acid house hits such as "Infinity", "Jack to the Sound of the Underground", "Acid Thunder", "Theme from S-Express" and "We Call It Acieed".

== Critical reception ==
Acid Brass was released to generally favourable reviews. Steve Huey of Allmusic was mixed in his assessment, who said "the somewhat dodgy (and condescending) concept for this record, by artist Jeremy Deller, is that both brass bands and raves are staples of British working-class life, so a fusion of the two styles of music is natural. While the results are certainly well played, it's extremely difficult to figure out exactly who Acid Brass is supposed to appeal to, except maybe the kitsch audience." Joshua Klein of The A.V. Club was favourable, saying: "If the musicians weren't so serious about the endeavor, it wouldn't quite work, and as it stands, A Guy Called Gerald's 'Voodoo Ray' sounds pretty silly when played by a marching band. But the arrangements retain much of the simple hookiness of the originals."
