= K Foundation Burn a Million Quid =

1994 work of performance art

Watch the K Foundation Burn a Million Quid
- 1995 poster announcing a screening tour of Watch the K Foundation Burn a Million Quid
- Directed by: Gimpo
- Starring: K Foundation
- Distributed by: K Foundation
- Release date: 23 August 1995
- Running time: 67 minutes
- Country: United Kingdom
- Language: English
- Budget: £1,000,000

K Foundation Burn a Million Quid (Note: "Quid" is a widely used British slang word meaning pounds sterling (singular or plural: "a quid", "a million quid").) was a work of performance art executed and filmed on 23 August 1994 in which the K Foundation, a British art duo consisting of Bill Drummond and Jimmy Cauty, burned £1 million (equivalent to £2.1 million in 2025) in the back of a disused boathouse on the Ardfin Estate on the island of Jura in the Inner Hebrides. The money represented the bulk of the K Foundation's funds that had been previously earned by Drummond and Cauty as the KLF.

The event was recorded on a Hi-8 video camera by K Foundation collaborator Gimpo. On the first anniversary of the burning, the film was released as Watch the K Foundation Burn a Million Quid and was toured around the UK, with Drummond and Cauty engaging audiences in debates about the burning and its meaning. In November 1995, the duo pledged to dissolve the K Foundation and to refrain from public discussion of the burning for a period of 23 years.

Drummond discreetly spoke about the burning in 2000 and 2004. Initially, he was unrepentant, but in 2004 he admitted that he regretted burning the money. The self-imposed moratorium officially ended on 23 August 2017, 23 years after the burning, when Cauty and Drummond hosted a debate asking "Why Did the K Foundation Burn a Million Quid?" during their "Welcome to the Dark Ages" event.

Collaborator Chris Brook edited and compiled a book, K Foundation Burn A Million Quid, which was published by Ellipsis Books in 1997. It compiles stills from the film, accounts of events and viewer reactions, and an image of the brick that was manufactured from the fire's ashes. A film consisting of a static three-minute shot of the brick, This Brick, was shown at London's Barbican Centre prior to Drummond and Cauty's performance as 2K in the same year.

== Background ==
As the KLF, Bill Drummond and Jimmy Cauty were the biggest-selling singles act in the world for 1991. They had also enjoyed considerable success with their album The White Room and a number one hit single – "Doctorin' the Tardis" – as The Timelords. In February 1992, the KLF staged an incendiary performance at the BRIT Awards, and retired from the music industry shortly thereafter in typically enigmatic fashion.

By their own account, neither Drummond nor Cauty kept any of the money they made as the KLF; it was all ploughed back into their extravagant productions. Cauty told an Australian Big Issue writer in 2003 that all the money they made as the KLF was spent, and that the royalties they accrued post-retirement amounted to approximately one million pounds:

I think we made about £6m. We paid nearly half that in tax and spent the rest on production costs. When we stopped, the production costs stopped too, so over the next few months we amassed a surplus of cash still coming in from record sales; this amounted to about £1.8m. After tax we were left with about £1m. This was the money that later became the K Foundation fund for the 'advancement of kreation.'

Initially the KLF's earnings were to be distributed by way of a fund for struggling artists managed by the K Foundation, Drummond and Cauty's new post-KLF art project, but, said Drummond, "We realised that struggling artists are meant to struggle, that's the whole point." Instead the duo decided to create art with the money. Nailed to the Wall was the first piece of art produced by the Foundation, and the major piece in their planned art exhibition, Money: A Major Body of Cash. Consisting of one million pounds in cash nailed to a pine frame, the piece was presented to the press on 23 November 1993 during the buildup to the Foundation's announcement of the "winner" of their "worst artist of the year award", the K Foundation art award.

== Decision and burning ==
During the first half of 1994, the K Foundation attempted to interest galleries in staging Money: A Major Body of Cash, but even old friend Jayne Casey, director of the Liverpool Festival Trust, was unable to persuade a major gallery to participate. "'The Tate, in Liverpool, wanted to be part of the 21st Century Festival I'm involved with,' says Casey. 'I suggested they put on the K Foundation exhibition; at first they were encouraging, but they seemed nervous about the personalities involved.' A curt fax from [...] the gallery curator informed Casey that the K Foundation's exhibition of money had been done before and more interestingly", leaving Drummond and Cauty obliged to pursue other options. The duo considered taking the exhibition across the former Soviet Union by train and on to the United States, but no insurer would touch the project. An exhibition at Kilmainham Jail in Dublin was then considered, but no sooner had a provisional August date been set for it than the duo changed their minds yet again. "Jimmy said: 'Why don't we just burn it?' remembers Drummond. 'He said it in a light-hearted way, I suppose, hoping I'd say: 'No, we can't do that, let's do this...' But it seemed the most powerful thing to do." Cauty: "We were just sitting in a cafe talking about what we were going to spend the money on and then we decided it would be better if we burned it. That was about six weeks before we did it. It was too long, it was a bit of a nightmare."

The journey from deciding to burn the money to deciding how to burn the money to actually burning the money was a long one. Jim Reid, a freelance journalist and the only independent witness to the burning, reported the various schemes the K Foundation considered. The first was offering Nailed to the Wall to the Tate Gallery as the "1995 K Foundation Bequest to the Nation." The condition was that the gallery must agree to display the piece for at least 10 years. If they refused, the money would be burnt. A second idea was to hire Bankside Power Station, "the future site of the Tate Gallery extension and an imposing building downstream from the South Bank", as a bonfire venue. In typical KLF 'guerrilla communication' style, "posters were to appear on 15 August bearing the legend 'The 1995 K Foundation Bequest to the Nation', under which would have been an image of Nailed to the Wall on an easel and two flame-throwers lying on the floor. On 24 August a new poster would go up, exactly the same as the first except that this time the work would be burnt."

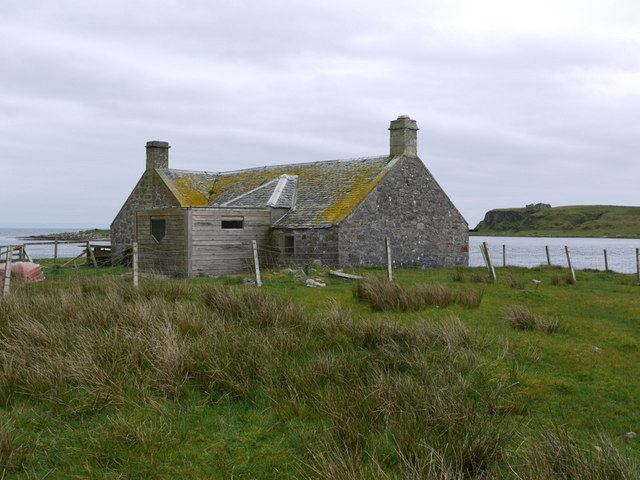
The Boathouse on the Ardfin Estate where the K Foundation burnt £1 million

The K Foundation's ultimate resolution for their one-million-pound "problem" was rather less showbiz, but dramatic nonetheless, the Foundation having decided that making a public spectacle of the event would lessen its impact. On 22 August, Reid, Drummond, Cauty and Gimpo touched down at Islay Airport in the Inner Hebrides and took a ferry to the island of Jura, previously the scene of a wicker man burning ceremony by the KLF. Early in the morning of 23 August 1994, in an abandoned boathouse on Jura, Drummond and Cauty incinerated the money. The burning was witnessed by Reid, who subsequently wrote an article about the act for The Observer, and it was filmed on a Hi-8 video camera by collaborator Gimpo. As the burning began Reid said he felt guilt and shock. These feelings, he reported, quickly turned to boredom.

The money took well over an hour to burn as Drummond and Cauty fed £50 notes into the fire. According to Drummond, only about £900,000 of the money was actually burnt, with the remainder flying straight up the chimney. Two days later, according to Reid, Jimmy Cauty destroyed all film and photographic evidence of the burning. Ten months later, Gimpo revealed to them that he had secretly kept a copy.

== Film ==
Watch the K Foundation Burn a Million Quid starts with a short description of the event, and then consists of Drummond and Cauty throwing £50 notes onto the fire. Burning the entire amount takes around 67 minutes. NME wrote:

At the start, Cauty is agitated and says he doesn't think the money will burn because it is too wet. The camera shows 20 thick bundles of £50 notes, each bundle containing £50,000 in new bank notes and sealed in cellophane. When the money ignites, Drummond starts to laugh as he and Cauty stand above a small fireplace throwing £50 notes on to the fire. Cauty constantly stokes the blaze with a large wooden plank and at one stage burns his hand on a flaming note. As the fire starts to dim, he scuttles around the floor sweeping stray notes into the flames. The cameraman shows a view from outside the building with charred £50 notes billowing out of the chimney.

In November 1995, the BBC aired an edition of the Omnibus documentary series about The K Foundation entitled A Foundation Course in Art (usually mislabelled as The K Foundation Burn a Million Quid online). Amongst the footage broadcast were scenes from Watch the K Foundation Burn a Million Quid. Thomas Sutcliffe, reviewing the programme in The Independent, wrote:

The Omnibus film about this intriguing pair was in part a rear-guard action in their continuing battle for recognition (and a victory – for some people, after all, art is what appears on Omnibus). It was also a peculiarly modern fable about what constitutes an artist – will the artist's say-so do, or do you need the validation of the galleries? "You can't simply decide you're going to become an artist," said one gallery owner haughtily, which left you wondering how else the vocation might operate. A lottery system? Secret-ballot election? For my money (meagre though it is), the video which recorded the laborious process of immolation was a decidedly intriguing work – rather more provoking than some contemporary work I've seen. For established galleries, the medium used (video, bank-notes, fire) is obviously an embarrassment, but if poverty of material is not to disqualify artworks (bricks or lard, say) why should the expense of material?

A still of the film from the book K Foundation Burn a Million Quid

=== Screening tour ===
The first public screening of Watch the K Foundation Burn a Million Quid was on Jura on 23 August 1995 – exactly one year after the burning. "We feel we should face them and answer their questions" said one of the duo. Two weeks later an advert appeared in The Guardian, announcing a world tour of the film over the next 12 months at "relevant locations". The second screening was at In the City music industry convention on 5 September in Manchester. After the film was shown, Drummond and Cauty held a question-and-answer session with the theme "Is It Rock'n'Roll?". A week later, the pair travelled as guests of alternative radio station B92 to Belgrade, where the post-screening discussion was titled "Is it a crime against humanity?" An unauthorised screening at the BBC Television Centre was curtailed and Drummond and Cauty were escorted from the building.

On the weekend of 3 November 1995, the film was screened at several locations in Glasgow, including at football matches involving Celtic and Rangers; a planned screening at Barlinnie prison was cancelled after the Scottish Prison Service withdrew permission. Glasgow's artistic community broadly seemed to welcome the screenings. A further public screening on Glasgow Green on 5 November was announced by various newspapers, but there is no record of the showing having ever occurred. The K Foundation disappeared from Glasgow; they later issued a statement that on 5 November 1995 they had signed a "contract" on the side of a Nissan Bluebird – which had then been pushed over the cliffs at Cape Wrath in northern Scotland – agreeing to wind up the K Foundation and not to speak about the money burning for a period of 23 years.

Despite the K Foundation's reported moratorium, further national screenings of the film organised by Chris Brook took place as planned. At each screening, Drummond and Cauty announced they would not answer questions after the film; instead, they would ask questions of the audience. These screenings were held in Bradford, Hull, Liverpool, Jamaica Street Studios, Cheltenham Ladies College, Eton College, Aberystwyth, Glastonbury Tor, Alan Moore's front room and Brick Lane, London.

The Brick Lane screening – on 8 December 1995 – had been previewed in NME, and was chaotically busy. It was originally planned for a car park, but freezing conditions and snow forced a rethink and the screening was moved indoors, to the basement of the nearby Seven Stars pub. Hundreds of people crammed in to watch the screening, which was eventually abandoned partway through due to the cramped conditions. The NME preview had claimed that after the screening the film would be cut up and individual frames sold off to the public. Gimpo, the owner of the film, had no intention of doing so, but after the screening was nearly overwhelmed by a mob of people wanting to take home a piece of the film.

== End of the moratorium ==
Drummond and Cauty ended their self-imposed moratorium on 23 August 2017, 23 years after the burning. "Why Did the K Foundation Burn a Million Quid?" was debated during "Welcome to the Dark Ages", a three-day festival celebrating the launch of their novel 2023: A Trilogy.

== Burning as a theme ==
Ellipsis' K Foundation-style advert promoting the book K Foundation Burn a Million Quid

Ritualistic burnings had already been a recurring aspect of Drummond and Cauty's work. In 1987, the duo disposed of copies of their copyright-breaching debut album—The Justified Ancients of Mu Mu's 1987 (What the Fuck Is Going On?)—by burning them in a Swedish field. This event was pictured on the back sleeve of their second album, Who Killed The JAMs?, and celebrated in the song "Burn the Bastards". During the 1991 summer solstice, they burnt a 60 feet (18 m) wicker man on Jura, as chronicled in the KLF movie The Rites of Mu.

As the K Foundation, Drummond and Cauty threatened to burn the K Foundation art award prize money (Gimpo was fumbling with matches and lighter fluid when, at the last moment, Rachel Whiteread accepted the prize). In the seventh K Foundation press advert they asked "What would you do with a million pounds? Burn it?"

== Reaction and analysis ==
Jim Reid's piece appeared in The Observer on 25 September 1994. This is "one of the most peculiar stories of the year", he cautioned readers. "Peculiar because pretty much everyone who comes across this magazine is going to have trouble believing a word of it. Peculiar because every last dot and comma of what is to come is the truth." "It took about two hours for that cash to go up in flames", he added. "I looked at it closely, it was real. It came from a bona fide security firm and was not swapped at any time on our journey. More importantly, perhaps, after working with the K Foundation I know they are capable of this."

The Daily Express ran the story on 1 October 1994. They reported that charred £50 notes were being found by islanders, who did not doubt the burning had really taken place. Drummond and Cauty had been seen eating in a hotel bar on Jura before leaving with two suitcases, the newspaper reported.

The Times followed with essentially the same story on 4 October 1994, adding that the burning "[had] left many on the island bewildered, incredulous and angry". £1,500 had been handed in by a local fisherman to Islay police: "Sergeant Lachlan Maclean checked the money with both banks on Islay and with Customs and Excise, who pronounced it genuine. 'I telephoned Mr Drummond in London and told him the money had been found. I asked him if it was his. He said he would get in touch with his partner, Mr Cauty. So far he has not telephoned back'".

The media returned to the story in earnest in October and November 1995, previewing and then reviewing Foundation Course in Art, and reporting on the K Foundation's tour screening Watch the K Foundation Burn a Million Quid.

An October 1995 feature quoted Kevin Hull, the BBC documentary maker responsible for the Omnibus item, saying he had found "the boys rather depressed, and almost in a state of shock". "Every day I wake up and I think 'Oh God, I've burnt a million quid and everyone thinks it's wrong'", Cauty told him.

A piece in The Times on 5 November 1995, coinciding with the Glasgow screenings, reported that the K Foundation had no solid reason for burning the money or view of what, if anything, the act represented, but concluded "The K Foundation may not have changed or challenged much but they have certainly provoked thousands to question and analyse the power of money and the responsibilities of those who possess it. And what could be more artistic than that?" In the same issue, the newspaper's K Foundation art award witness, Robert Sandall, wrote that the Foundation's award, million-pound artwork and the burning were all "entertaining, and satirically quite sharp", but "the art world has chosen not to think [of it as art].... The general view remains that the K Foundation's preoccupation with money, though undoubtedly sincere, simply isn't very original. Although they didn't blow their entire life's savings along the way, other artists, notably Yves Klein and Chris Burden, have been here before."

The Guardian's TV reviewer was sceptical. "Snag is, the K men have always dealt in myth and sown a trail of confusion, so nobody quite believes they really burned the money. And if they did, they must be nuts."

=== Later reaction ===
In the following years, the burning was mentioned regularly in the press, with Drummond and Cauty often relegated to a cultural status of "the men who burnt a million quid".

A February 2000 article in The Observer newspaper again insisted that the duo really had burnt one million pounds. "It wasn't a stunt. They really did it. If you want to rile Bill Drummond, you call him a hoaxer. 'I knew it was real,' a long-time friend and associate of his group The KLF tells me, 'because afterwards, Jimmy and Bill looked so harrowed and haunted. And to be honest, they've never really been the same since'".

A 2004 listener poll by BBC Radio 6 Music saw the KLF/K Foundation placed second after The Who in a list of "rock excesses".

Drummond's former protégé Julian Cope was unimpressed, claiming that Drummond still owed him money. "He burned a million pounds which was not all his, and some of it was mine. People should pay off their creditors before they pull intellectual dry-wank stunts like that."

== Legacy ==
On 17 September 1997, a new film, This Brick, was premiered. The film consisted of one three-minute shot of a brick made from the ashes of the money burnt at Jura. It was shown at the Barbican Centre prior to Drummond and Cauty's performance as 2K.

On 27 September 1997, K Foundation Burn A Million Quid (ISBN 0-9541656-5-9, ISBN 1-899858-37-7 paperback) was published. The book, by Chris Brook and Gimpo, contains stills from the film and transcriptions of various Q&A sessions from the tour. It also includes a timeline of K Foundation activity and sundry essays including one from Alan Moore. Publisher Ellipsis promoted the book with an advert modelled on those of the K Foundation – "Why did Ellipsis publish K Foundation Burn A Million Quid?" they asked.

Initially, Drummond was unrepentant, telling The Observer in 2000 that he couldn't imagine ever feeling regret unless his child was ill and only "an expensive clinic" could cure him. By 2004, however, he had admitted to the BBC the difficulty of explaining his decision. "It's a hard one to explain to your kids and it doesn't get any easier. I wish I could explain why I did it so people would understand."
