= Glastonbury Festival 1989 =

Music festival in England

- Locations: Worthy Farm, Pilton, Somerset, England
- Previous event: Glastonbury Festival 1987
- Next event: Glastonbury Festival 1990

Glastonbury Festival 1989 performances included the Hothouse Flowers The Proclaimers' "Sunshine on Leith" concert tour included a performance at the 1989 Glastonbury Festival, playing to an audience of over 65,000. Tickets cost £28.

This was the first year that impromptu, unofficial sound systems sprang up around the festival site – a portent of things to come. These sound systems would play loud, electronic acid house music around the clock, with the largest, the Hypnosis sound system, rivalling the volume of some of the official stages and running non-stop throughout the festival. The Line-up included:

== Pyramid stage ==
Friday	Saturday	Sunday
Suzanne Vega; All About Eve; The Wonder Stuff; Pixies; Throwing Muses; Lucinda Williams	Elvis Costello; The Proclaimers; Hothouse Flowers; Fairground Attraction; Van Morrison; Azido; Bhundu Boys	Fela Kuti; Mahlathini and the Mahotella Queens; Youssou N'Dour; The Waterboys; Steve Cooney & Seamus Begley; Black Uhuru; Martin Stephenson; Donovan & Friends

Adam Clayton of U2 joined Hot House Flowers onstage to play on "Feet on the Ground".

Georgie Fame was Van Morrison's keyboard player and played "Yeh, Yeh" before Morrison arrived onstage.

Peter Gabriel joined Youssou N'Dour onstage for one or more songs.

There was speculation in the music press, prior to the festival, that Donovan's "friends" would include big names, such as Paul McCartney and Eric Clapton. The "friends" turned out to be Ozric Tentacles.

Elvis Costello's set was solo.
