= K Foundation =

Art foundation set up by Jimmy Cauty and Bill Drummond

- An early K Foundation advert: "Time is running in"

Background information
- Origin: United Kingdom
- Years active: 1993–1995
- Past members: Jimmy Cauty; Bill Drummond

The K Foundation was an art foundation set up by Jimmy Cauty and Bill Drummond, formerly of The KLF, in 1993, following their 'retirement' from the music industry. The Foundation served as an artistic outlet for the duo's post-retirement KLF income. Between 1993 and 1995, they spent this money in a number of ways, including on a series of Situationist-inspired press adverts and extravagant subversions in the art world, focusing in particular on the Turner Prize. Most notoriously, when their plans to use banknotes as part of a work of art fell through, they burned a million pounds in cash.

The K Foundation announced a 23-year moratorium on all projects from November 1995. They further indicated that they would not speak about the burning of the million pounds during the period of this moratorium.

== Context ==
In the early 1980s, British musician and artist Jimmy Cauty was the guitarist in an underachieving pop/rock band, Brilliant. Brilliant had been signed to WEA Records by A&R man Bill Drummond, formerly a member of the Liverpool group Big in Japan, the manager of The Teardrop Explodes and Echo & the Bunnymen, and co-founder of the independent record label Zoo Records. In 1986, Brilliant released their one and only album - Kiss The Lips Of Life - before splitting up. In the same year, Drummond left WEA Records to record a solo album. Whilst out walking on New Year's Day, 1987, Drummond hit upon an idea for a hip-hop record but, he said, knowing "nothing, personally, about the technology", he needed a collaborator. Drummond called Jimmy Cauty who agreed to join him in a new band called The Justified Ancients of Mu-Mu (The JAMs).

The JAMs' debut release, the single "All You Need Is Love", was released as an underground white label on 9 March 1987. By 1991, the duo—now calling themselves The KLF—had become the best-selling singles band in the world and, according to Allmusic, were "on the verge of becoming superstars". Instead, in May 1992 they machine-gunned a music industry audience at the BRIT Awards (albeit with blanks) and quit the music business.

By their own account, neither Drummond nor Cauty kept any of the money that they made as The KLF; it was all ploughed back into their extravagant productions. Cauty told an Australian Big Issue writer in 2003 that all the money they made as The KLF was spent, and that the royalties they accrued post-retirement amounted to approximately one million pounds:

I think we made about £6m. We paid nearly half that in tax and spent the rest on production costs. When we stopped, the production costs stopped too, so over the next few months we amassed a surplus of cash still coming in from record sales; this amounted to about £1.8m. After tax we were left with about £1m.

Although the duo had deleted their back catalogue in the UK with immediate effect, international licensees retained the contractual right to distribute KLF recordings for a number of years. The KLF, like any other artist, were also entitled to Performing Right Society royalties every time one of their songs was played on the radio or television. Rather than spend these earnings or invest them for personal gain, the duo decided the money would be used to fund a new art foundation - The K Foundation. "Having created an artistic machine that created money", said GQ Magazine, "they [then] invented a machine for destroying it." Quite what the Foundation, this money-destroying machine, would do with the million pounds plus was still undecided.

Music journalist Sarah Champion pointed out (prior to the million pound fire) that, "Being 'in the money' doesn't mean they'll ever be rich. [Drummond and Cauty will] always be skint, but their pranks will get more extravagant. If they earned £10 million, they'd blow it all by buying Jura or a fleet of K Foundation airships or a Van Gogh to be ceremonially burned." "There are things we'd like to do which we haven't done.", Drummond told a journalist in 1991. "Totally ludicrous things. We want to buy ships, have submarines. They really are stupid things I know, but I feel confident that in the event of us selling ten million albums we would definitely go out and buy a submarine....Just to be able to say 'Look we've got a submarine and 808 State haven't'."

== K Foundation adverts ==
The first manifestation of the K Foundation was a series of adverts in UK national newspapers in 1993. The first adverts, in July 1993, were cryptic, referring to "K Time" and advising readers to "Kick out the clocks". There was also an advert for their single "K Cera Cera" which was "Available nowhere ... no formats" and which was not planned for release until world peace was established. The single was eventually released, but only in Israel.

"When the first in a strange series of full-page ads appeared in The Independent on July 4", said The Face, "people started whispering. The cultish rhetoric, the unfathomable "Divide and Kreate" slogans, the K symbols, all suggested that the kings of cultural anarchy were back." Each advert cost between £5,000 and £15,000.

== Turner Prize subversion ==
The 1994 K Foundation award was an award given by the K Foundation to the "worst artist of the year". The Foundation commissioned more press adverts, instructing readers to "Abandon all art now" and then inviting them to vote for the worst artist of the year. The 1993 Turner Prize was being judged at the same time, and, perhaps not coincidentally, both awards had the same shortlist of four artists. The prize being offered by Drummond and Cauty was £40,000 which was double the £20,000 offered for the Turner Prize.

Channel 4 Television broadcast coverage of the Turner Prize, during which three more K Foundation adverts were broadcast — these announced the "amending of art history". During the evening, Rachel Whiteread was announced as the winner of both the Turner Prize and the K Foundation award. Whiteread initially refused to accept the K Foundation prize, but after being told that the money would be incinerated, she reluctantly accepted, with the intention of donating £30,000 to artists in financial need and the other £10,000 to the housing charity, Shelter.

== Money: A Major Body of Cash ==
During the buildup to the presentation of the K Foundation art award to Rachel Whiteread on 23 November 1993, the K Foundation presented their first artwork to the press. Nailed To A Wall, "the first of a series of K Foundation art installations that will also include one million pounds in a skip, one million pounds on a table and several variants on the theme of Tremendous Amounts Of Folding", consisted of one million pounds in £50 notes, nailed to a large framed board. Nailed To A Wall had a reserve price of £500,000, half the face value of the cash used in its construction, which Scotland on Sunday's reporter Robert Dawson Scott was "fairly confident... really was £1 million [in cash]". The catalogue entry for the artwork stated: "Over the years the face value will be eroded by inflation, while the artistic value will rise and rise. The precise point at which the artistic value will overtake the face value is unknown. Deconstruct the work now and you double your money. Hang it on a wall and watch the face value erode, the market value fluctuate, and the artistic value soar. The choice is yours."

Collectively, the K Foundation's money-as-art works were titled Money: A Major Body Of Cash, "seven pieces, all involving various amounts of cash nailed to, tied to or simply standing on inanimate objects". The Face magazine neatly summed up the concepts behind the art project:

If there is any overriding theme to all this unfathomable rhetoric, it's that money has become the root of all art. The questions posed in the K Foundation's first catalogue all hint at this idea: "How beautiful is money?" "Why do we try and make money measure the immeasurable?" "Have you ever shagged somebody who works in a bank?" In short, "What is money?" To add further weight to this theory, they also pull off a neat conceptual punchline. Their art is made out of cash. The face value of that cash is obvious. The artistic value, until somebody buys it and gives it artistic status, is zero. The K Foundation have put a price on these works precisely halfway between their current monetary value and their artistic value. The joke being that if you were to buy the piece called 10,000 (four piles of mint fifties nailed to a plank of salvaged skirting board) for the asking price of 5,000 (ono), you stand to pocket five grand if you destroy the art and spend the money. Alternatively, hang it on your wall and see the cash value eroded by inflation while the artistic value soars. It's the sale of the century!

During the first half of 1994, the K Foundation attempted to interest galleries in staging Money: A Major Body Of Cash. However, even old friend Jayne Casey, director of the Liverpool Festival Trust, was unable to persuade a major gallery to participate. "'The Tate, in Liverpool, wanted to be part of the 21st Century Festival I'm involved with,' says Casey. 'I suggested they put on the K Foundation exhibition; at first they were encouraging, but they seemed nervous about the personalities involved.' A curt fax from... the gallery curator, informed Casey that the K Foundation's exhibition of money had been done before and more interestingly", leaving Drummond and Cauty obliged to pursue other options. The duo considered taking the exhibition across the former Soviet Union by train and on to the United States, but no insurer would touch the project. Then an exhibition at Dublin's Kilmainham Jail was considered. No sooner had a provisional date of August been set for the exhibition, however, when the duo changed their minds yet again. "Jimmy said: 'Why don't we just burn it?' remembers Drummond. 'He said it in a light-hearted way, I suppose, hoping I'd say: 'No, we can't do that, let's do this...' But it seemed the most powerful thing to do." Cauty: "We were just sitting in a cafe talking about what we were going to spend the money on and then we decided it would be better if we burned it. That was about six weeks before we did it. It was too long, it was a bit of a nightmare."

== The K Foundation Burn a Million Quid ==
On 23 August 1994, in a boathouse on the Scottish island of Jura, Drummond and Cauty incinerated £1,000,000 in cash. The burning was witnessed by an old friend of Drummond's, freelance journalist Jim Reid, who subsequently wrote an article about the ceremony for The Observer. It was filmed on Hi-8 by their friend Gimpo.

Reid admitted to first feeling shock and guilt about the burning, which quickly turned to boredom. The money took well over an hour to burn as Drummond and Cauty fed £50 notes into the fire. Drummond later said that only about £900,000 of the money was actually burnt – the rest flew straight up the chimney. The press reported that an islander handed £1,500 into the police; the money had not been claimed and would be returned to the finder.

On 23 August 1995, exactly one year after the burning, Drummond and Cauty returned to Jura for the premiere screening of the film, now known as Watch the K Foundation Burn a Million Quid. The film was then toured around the UK over the next few months (plus one showing in Belgrade), with a Q&A session at the end of each screening where members of the audience asked Drummond and Cauty why they burnt the money and also offered their own interpretations.

== K Cera Cera and The Magnificent ==
The only music release to bear the name of the K Foundation was "K Cera Cera", released as a limited edition single in Israel and Palestine in November 1993. An amalgam of "Que Sera, Sera (Whatever Will Be, Will Be)" and John Lennon/Yoko Ono's "Happy Xmas (War Is Over)", it was credited to the "K Foundation presents The Red Army Choir". Originally intended for release when "world peace [is] established" (i.e. never) and in "no formats", the Israeli release was made "In acknowledgement of the recent brave steps taken by the Israeli Government and the Palestinian Liberation Organisation (PLO)". Said Drummond: "Our idea was to create awareness of peace in the world. Because we were worried it would be interpreted by the public as an attempt by The KLF to return to the music world on the back of a humanist gimmick, we decided to hide behind the Foundation."

Also made by the duo during the K Foundation's existence, reported by the NME as a K Foundation work, but officially attributed to "The One World Orchestra featuring The Massed Pipes and Drums of the Children's Free Revolutionary Volunteer Guards", was "The Magnificent", their contribution to the charity album Help. The song, a drum'n'bass version of the theme tune from The Magnificent Seven with vocal samples from DJ Fleka of Serbian radio station B92, was recorded on 4 September 1995. On 5 September 1995, Drummond and Cauty claimed they would "never make any more records". Drummond said, "What do you expect us to do, go and make a jungle record?"; Cauty added "Yeah, like a jungle novelty record with some strings on it or something. It would just be sad wouldn't it? We're too old." NME gleefully informed their readers, "The K Foundation's contribution to the 'Help' LP is a jungle track." Help was released on 9 September 1995.

== Moratorium ==
Drummond and Cauty announced a moratorium on K Foundation activities in the obscure "The Workshop for Non-linear Architecture" bulletin of November 1995. The duo had signed a "contract", agreeing to wind up the K Foundation and not to speak about the money burning for a period of 23 years. The document was signed on the bonnet of a rented car which, they claim, they then pushed over the cliffs at Cape Wrath. This was followed on 8 December 1995 by an advertisement in The Guardian:

On 5 November 1995, Jimmy Cauty and Bill Drummond signed a contract with the rest of the world agreeing to end the K Foundation for a period of 23 years. This postponement provides opportunity of sufficient length for an accurate and appropriately executed response to their 'burning of a million quid'. The K Foundation's fate now lies irrevocably sealed in the imploded remains of a Nissan Bluebird nestling among the rocks 600 feet below Cape Wrath, Scotland.

The final act of the K Foundation was distributing a van load of Tennent's Super, a high-alcohol-content lager, to London's street drinkers on Christmas Day 1995. However, the Foundation discovered that their choice of location for this endeavour — near Waterloo station on the South Bank — was unusually devoid of homeless people, many of whom were in homeless shelters for the day. "That was a pity", said Jimmy Cauty. "If you are down-and-out, would you rather have a bowl of soup or a can of Tennent's?" The Sunday Times later called the scheme "ethically dubious".

Drummond and Cauty, reunited as The Justified Ancients of Mu-Mu under the auspices of K2 Plant Hire Ltd, ended the moratorium on 23 August 2017, 23 years after the burning. "Why Did the K Foundation Burn a Million Quid?" was debated during a three-day festival celebrating the launch of their novel 2023: A Trilogy. In the intervening period, the duo had worked together in 1997, when they attempted to "Fuck the Millennium" as 2K (music) and K2 Plant Hire (conceptual art).

== Omnibus documentary ==
In November 1995, the BBC aired an edition of the Omnibus documentary series about The K Foundation entitled "A Foundation Course in Art".

== See also ==
- Anti-art
