= Moonflowers (band) =

The Moonflowers were a Bristol-based rock band formed in 1987. Active as a performing and recording unit until 1997, they released eight EPs and seven LPs on their own label, PopGod Records. The label hosted several other Bristol-based artists, including Praise Space Electric (a Moonflowers spin-off featuring members of that band), Me, Ecstatic Orange, and Mammal, among others.

== History ==
The band formed in 1987 and released their debut EP, We Dig Your Earth, in 1989. After a one-off single on Heavenly Records the following year "Get Higher"), singer The Reverend Sonik Ray (born Sean O'Neill) set up his own Pop God label for subsequent releases. The band received publicity after appearing in court for refusing to pay the poll tax, and appearing naked in the NME to promote their "Warshag" single. The band's debut album, Hash Smits, was released in December 1991, followed two years later by second album From Whales to Jupiter: Beyond the Stars of Rainbohemia. May 1995 saw the release of the Shake it Together EP and also an album that has been credited as having the longest title in history, We Would Fly Away (We Could Fly Away Never Look Back and Leave the World to Spin Silently in a Suicide Pact and all the Colours and Sounds That Pass Through Us in Space Fall Down to the Earth and Put a Smile on its Face).

The band relocated to France where they spent time busking, before returning to the studio for the Japan-only releases Brainwashing and Heartists Blue Life Stripes (1997) and Don't Just Sit There...Fly (2000) before splitting up.

Guitarist Jesse D Vernon had formed Morning Star in 1997, often featuring Jim Barr and John Parish, releasing four albums between 1997 and 2010. O'Neill formed a new band, Solar Mumuns, and released the album Breaking Waters in 2002.

Drummer Toby Pascoe died on 1 June 2001.

The Moonflowers reformed for a gig at the Cube Microplex on 11 November 2011.

Two of the band’s record sleeves, the EPs We Dig Your Earth and Get Higher, were featured in the exhibition Flower: Exploring the World in Bloom. Phaidon. 2025. ISBN 9781838660857. at the Saatchi Gallery in London in 2025.

== Band members ==
- The Reverend Sonik Ray (Sean O'Neill) - vocals, guitar
- Smokin' Sam Burns - keyboards, saxophone, vocals
- Jesse D Vernon - guitar
- Yoddom - drums (1987–1993)then percussion
- Dougal MacShagger (Paul Waterworth) - bass guitar (1987–1995)
- Elmo - DJ (1987–1990)
- Praise The Electric Moonchillum (Toby Pascoe) - drums, percussion, vocals (1990–2000)
- Gina Griffin - violin, vocals (1993–2000)

== Discography ==
=== Albums ===
- Hash Smits (1991), Pop God
- From Whales to Jupiter Beyond the Stars of Rainbohemia (1993), Pop God
- Colours and Sounds (We Could Fly Away Never Look Back and Leave the World to Spin Silently in a Suicide Pact and All the Colours and Sounds That Pass Through Us in Space Fall Down to the Earth and Put a Smile on Its Face) (1995), Pop God
- Brainwashing and Heartists Blue Life Stripes (1997), Crue-I
- Don't Just Sit There...Fly (2000), P-Vine

=== Compilations ===
- Black Beetles and White Bird (1996), Crue-I
- Dirty and Lost (EPs Collection) (2002), Colour and Sounds

=== Singles and EPs ===
- We Dig Your Earth EP (1989), Electric Stars
- "Get Higher" (1990), Heavenly
- "Warshag" (1991), Pop God
- "Fire" (1991), Pop God
- Groovepower EP (1991), Pop God
- Tighten Up on the Housework Brothers and Sisters EP (1992), Pop God
- The Covers EP (1992), Pop God
- Shake It Together EP (1995), Pop God
