= 23 enigma =

Belief that most incidents and events are directly connected to the number 23

The 23 enigma is a belief in the significance of the number 23. The concept of the 23 enigma has been popularized by various books, movies, and conspiracy theories, which suggest that the number 23 appears with unusual frequency in various contexts and may have a larger, hidden significance. Since the 1990s, the free techno and raver counterculture has adopted it as a symbol.

== Origins ==
Robert Anton Wilson cites William S. Burroughs as the first person to believe in the 23 enigma. In a 1977 article in Fortean Times Wilson related the following anecdote:

I first heard of the 23 enigma from William S Burroughs, author of Naked Lunch, Nova Express, etc. According to Burroughs, he had known a certain Captain Clark, around 1960 in Tangier, who once bragged that he had been sailing 23 years without an accident. That very day, Clark’s ship had an accident that killed him and everybody else aboard. Furthermore, while Burroughs was thinking about this crude example of the irony of the gods that evening, a bulletin on the radio announced the crash of an airliner in Florida, USA. The pilot was another Captain Clark and the flight was Flight 23.

== In literature ==
The 23 enigma can be seen in:

- Robert Anton Wilson and Robert Shea's 1975 book The Illuminatus! Trilogy (therein called the "23/17 Phenomenon")
- Wilson's 1977 book Cosmic Trigger I: The Final Secret of the Illuminati (therein called "the Law of Fives" or "the 23 Enigma")
- Arthur Koestler's contribution to The Challenge of Chance: A Mass Experiment in Telepathy and Its Unexpected Outcome (1973)
- Principia Discordia

The text titled Principia Discordia claims that "All things happen in fives, or are divisible by or are multiples of five, or are somehow directly or indirectly appropriate to 5"—this is referred to as the Law of Fives. The 23 enigma is regarded as a corollary of the Law of Fives because 2 + 3 = 5.

In these works, 23 is considered lucky, unlucky, sinister, strange, sacred to the goddess Eris, or sacred to the unholy gods of the Cthulhu Mythos.

The 23 enigma can be viewed as an example of apophenia, selection bias and confirmation bias. In interviews, Wilson acknowledged the self-fulfilling nature of the 23 enigma, implying that the real value of the Law of Fives and the 23 enigma is in their demonstration of the mind's ability to perceive "truth" in nearly anything.

When you start looking for something you tend to find it. This wouldn't be like Simon Newcomb, the great astronomer, who wrote a mathematical proof that heavier than air flight was impossible and published it a day before the Wright brothers took off. I'm talking about people who found a pattern in nature and wrote several scientific articles and got it accepted by a large part of the scientific community before it was generally agreed that there was no such pattern, it was all just selective perception."

In the Illuminatus! Trilogy, Wilson expresses the same view, saying that one can find numerological significance in anything, provided that one has "sufficient cleverness".

== In popular culture ==
Industrial music group Throbbing Gristle recounted in great detail the meeting of Burroughs and Captain Clark and the significance of the number 23 in the ballad "The Old Man Smiled". Their 1980 album Heathen Earth, where this song appears, also features the number 23 on the cover.

Music and art duo The Justified Ancients of Mu Mu (later known as The KLF and the K Foundation) named themselves after the fictional conspiratorial group "The Justified Ancients of Mummu" from Illuminatus!; the number 23 is a recurring theme in the duo's work. Perhaps most infamously, as the K Foundation they performed a performance art piece, K Foundation Burn a Million Quid on 23 August 1994 and subsequently agreed not to publicly discuss the burning for a period of 23 years. 23 years to the day after the burning they returned to launch a novel and discuss why they had burnt the money.

The number 23, as well as the numbers 4, 8, 15, 16, and 42, serve as motifs in the television series Lost. Series co-creator Damon Lindelof has suggested that the choice of using the number 23 stems from the Illuminatus! Trilogy.

The 2007 film The Number 23, starring Jim Carrey, is the story of a man who becomes obsessed with the number 23 while reading a book of the same title that seems to be about his life.

== See also ==
- Apophenia
- Benford's law
- Chaos magick
- Confirmation bias
- Frequency illusion
- Ideas of reference and delusions of reference
- Illusory correlation
- Strong law of small numbers
- Texas sharpshooter fallacy
