= Alan Goodrick =

British film director (born 1962)

Alan David Goodrick (born April 1962 in Manchester), better known under the pseudonym Gimpo, is an English film director and former roadie, best known as an associate and collaborator of The KLF and the K Foundation.

Goodwick organises an annual 25-hour drive around the M25 called the M25 spin, repeated every year on the weekend closest to 23 March (with many KLF fans from around the world joining in). The first time this took place was in 1997 when he was accompanied by Bill Drummond and artist Dave Green, and has produced a film of this event. The M25 spin can be seen as exploring similar motifs to those in Iain Sinclair's London Orbital book.

In August 1994, Goodrick made a film of K Foundation originators Bill Drummond and Jimmy Cauty burning one million pounds sterling in cash; he kept the master tapes before the Foundation reacquired them. He drove Drummond and Mark Manning to the top of the world (as recounted in Bad Wisdom).

He was the ski-masked person fumbling with lighter fluid and matches when Rachel Whiteread came to claim the K Foundation art award.

He is currently an underground/alternative arts film maker and is frequently involved with both Drummond and Jimmy Cauty's current projects. Although he has claimed that he has given up the role, he is often described as a roadie.

== Background ==
Goodrick reportedly served with the British Army in the Falklands War. He later met up with Zodiac Mindwarp (the alter ego of Mark Manning) and started to work part-time with his band The Love Reaction. After a period as a roadie for various Food Records bands such as Blur and Jesus Jones, he set up Pit Bull management and began to manage the Love Reaction.

== Bibliography ==
K Foundation: Burn A Million Quid, with Chris Brook (Ellipsis, 1997)

== Discography ==
Gimpo (Kalevala Records, 1997)
