= K Cera Cera =

"K Cera Cera (War Is Over If You Want It)"

Single by The K Foundation presents The Red Army Choir
- Released: November 1993 (Israel); November–December 1993 (Palestine)
- Length: 4:33
- Label: NMC
- Songwriters: Livingston; Evans; Lennon; Ono
- Producers: Bill Drummond; Jimmy Cauty

Drummond and Cauty singles chronology
"3 a.m. Eternal (The KLF vs ENT version)" (1992)	"K Cera Cera" (1993)	"Fuck the Millennium" (1997)

"K Cera Cera (War Is Over If You Want It)" is a medley arranged by the K Foundation (Bill Drummond and Jimmy Cauty) and performed by the Red Army Choir. The song is a medley of Jay Livingston/Ray Evans's "Que Sera, Sera (Whatever Will Be, Will Be)" and John Lennon/Yoko Ono's "Happy Xmas (War Is Over)".

Originally intended for release only when "world peace [is] established" (i.e. "never" and in "no formats"), it was released as a limited-edition single in Israel and Palestine in November 1993. This release was made "In acknowledgement of the recent brave steps taken by the Israeli Government and the Palestinian Liberation Organisation (PLO)". Said Bill Drummond: "Our idea was to create awareness of peace in the world. Because we were worried it would be interpreted by the public as an attempt by The KLF to return to the music world on the back of a humanist gimmick, we decided to hide behind the Foundation."

Plans to broadcast the track from the main stage of the 1993 Glastonbury Festival at the beginning and end of every day were scuppered by festival organiser Michael Eavis because, in his words, the record was "simply dreadful". The record was instead broadcast at that year's Phoenix Festival.

A rendition of "K Cera Cera" was incorporated into Drummond and Cauty's 1997 "23 minutes only" comeback performance at the Barbican Centre in London, part of their "Fuck the Millennium" campaign.
