= Sarah Champion (journalist) =

English music journalist and author

Sarah Champion (born 1970 in Manchester) is an English music journalist and author. She has documented the 24 Hour Party People era and edited several collections of chemical fiction, including Disco Biscuits in 1997.

== Career ==
Champion started publishing while still going to school in Chorlton, Manchester, producing the fanzine Alarm as a fourteen-year-old on a photocopier. Alarm sold well and was reviewed in other Manchester fanzines like Debris and Blackpool Rox. Before long, Champion started writing for Debris.

Leaving school and moving to London for a while, Champion wrote for New Musical Express but then returned to Manchester to become a freelance writer. She went on to contribute a weekly column in the Manchester Evening News. At the same time, she ran her own indie record label and public relations company, and wrote And God Created Manchester, a book about Manchester's music scene. Champion then became involved in London's electronic music world and travelled to Berlin, Chicago, and Tokyo writing about club culture for music publications including Trance Europe Express, MixMag and Melody Maker.

In the 1990s, Champion edited four anthologies of fiction for Sceptre and Penguin which were accompanied by CD releases and club nights. This was followed by Disco 2000 — a book about pre-millennial paranoia, Shenanigans — about Ireland after dark, and Fortune Hotel — a collection of twisted travel stories.

Champion visited Bangkok where she worked for Asian pop and travel websites and as a news and business editor for an English language newspaper for two years. In 2004, she was mistaken for the blogging prostitute Belle de Jour.

Since then, Champion has been living between San Francisco and Manchester working on various creative projects including for community radio pioneers Radio Regen. In June 2006 she moved back to London. In August 2006 she wrote a cover story for The Observer's Review section about the return of rave culture.
