= Rachel Whiteread =

English artist (born 1963)

Dame Rachel Whiteread DBE
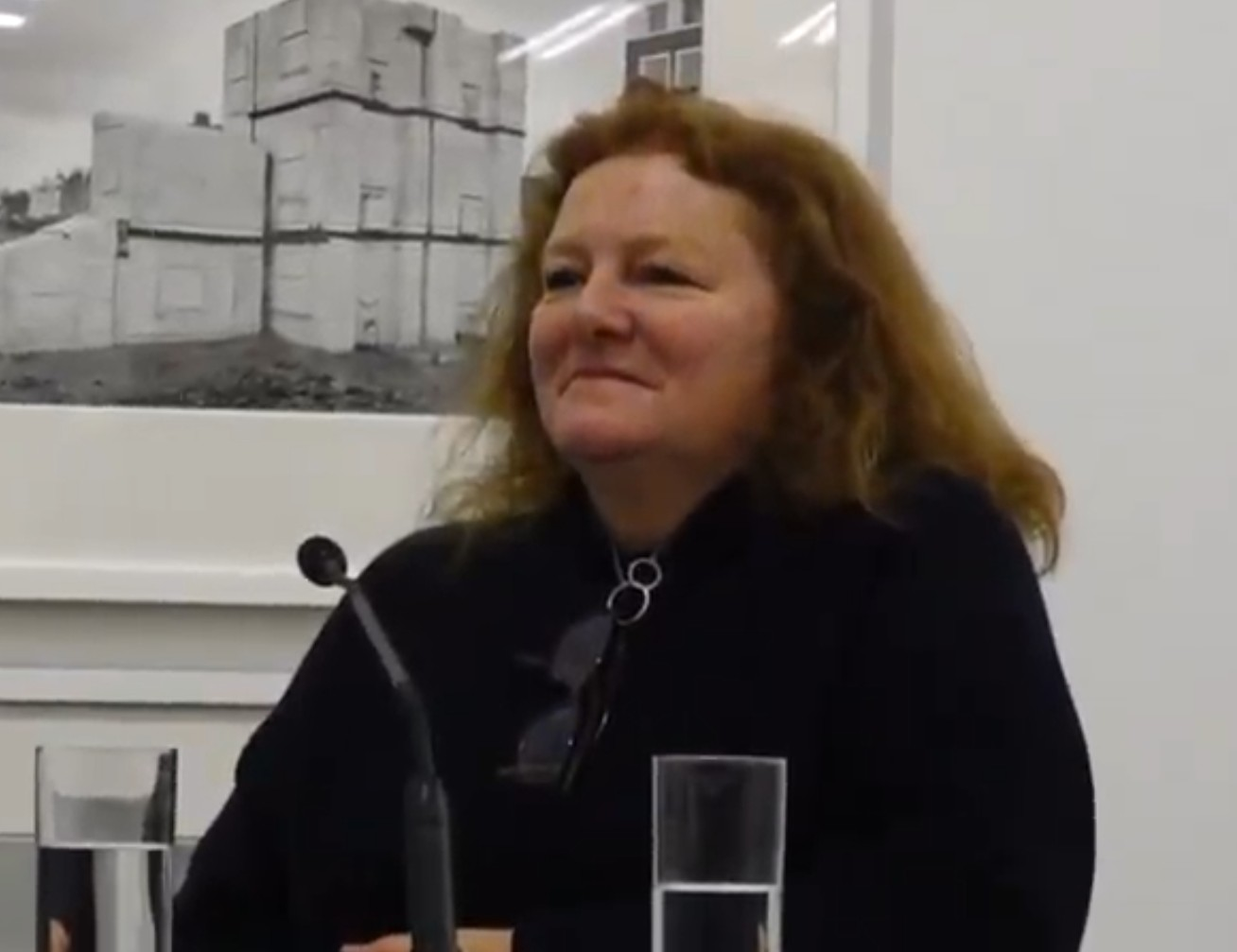
- Whiteread in 2018
- Born: 20 April 1963 (age 63); Ilford, Essex, England
- Education: Brighton Polytechnic, Brighton; Cyprus College of Art, Lemba; Slade School of Fine Art, London
- Known for: Sculpture, Installation art
- Notable work: Ghost (1990); House (1993); Judenplatz Holocaust Memorial (2000); Untitled Monument (Fourth plinth) (2001); Embankment (2005–2006)
- Movement: Young British Artists
- Awards: Turner Prize (1993); K Foundation art award (1994)
- Patrons: Environmental Justice Foundation

Dame Rachel Whiteread (born 20 April 1963) is an English artist who primarily produces sculptures, which typically take the form of casts. She was the first woman to win the annual Turner Prize in 1993.

Whiteread was one of the Young British Artists who exhibited at the Royal Academy's Sensation exhibition in 1997. Among her most renowned works are House, a large concrete cast of the inside of an entire Victorian house; the Judenplatz Holocaust Memorial in Vienna, resembling the shelves of a library with the pages turned outwards; and Untitled Monument, her resin sculpture for the empty fourth plinth in London's Trafalgar Square.

She was appointed Commander of the Order of the British Empire (CBE) in 2006 and Dame Commander of the Order of the British Empire (DBE) in the 2019 Birthday Honours for services to art.

== Early life and education ==
Whiteread was born in 1963 in Ilford, Essex, England. Her mother, Patricia Whiteread (née Lancaster), who was also an artist, died in 2003 at the age of 72. Her father, Thomas Whiteread, was a geography teacher, polytechnic administrator and lifelong supporter of the Labour Party, who died when Whiteread was studying at art school in 1988. She is the third of three sisters – the older two being identical twins.

She took a workshop on casting with the sculptor Richard Wilson and began to realize the possibilities in casting objects. She was briefly at the Cyprus College of Art. From 1985 to 1987 she studied sculpture at Slade School of Art, University College, London, where she was taught by Phyllida Barlow, graduating with an MA in 1987. Whiteread worked as an invigilator at the Serpentine Gallery.

For a time she worked in Highgate Cemetery fixing lids back onto time-damaged coffins. She began to exhibit in 1987, with her first solo exhibition coming in 1988. She lives and works in a former synagogue in east London with long-term partner and fellow sculptor Marcus Taylor. They have two sons.

== Work ==
Many of Whiteread's works are casts of ordinary domestic objects and, in numerous cases, their so-called negative space. For example, she is known for making solid casts of the open space in and around pieces of furniture such as tables and chairs, architectural details and even entire rooms and buildings. She says the casts carry "the residue of years and years of use." Whiteread mainly focuses on the line and the form for her pieces.

While still at the Slade, Whiteread cast domestic objects and created her first sculpture, Closet. She made a plaster cast of the interior of a wooden wardrobe and covered it with black felt. It was based on comforting childhood memories of hiding in a dark closet. After she graduated she rented space for a studio using the Enterprise Allowance Scheme. She created Shallow Breath (1988), the cast of the underside of a bed, made not long after her father died. Both sculptures were exhibited in her first solo show in 1988 along with casts of other domestic pieces. The work all sold and allowed her to apply for grants to find funding for larger sculptures.

=== Ghost ===
After her first solo exhibition, Whiteread decided to cast the space that her domestic objects could have inhabited. She applied for grants, describing the project as "mummifying the air in a room." She completed Ghost in 1990. It was cast from a room in a house on Archway Road in north London, much like the house she grew up in. The road was being widened, and the house was torn down. She used plaster to cast the parlor walls and ceiling in sections and assembled them on a metal frame.

Ghost was first shown at the nonprofit Chisenhale Gallery. It was purchased by Charles Saatchi and included with other works by Whiteread in his first Young British Art show in 1992. In May 2004 a fire in a Momart storage warehouse destroyed many works from the Saatchi collection, including, it is believed, some by Whiteread. However, Ghost had recently been moved from the warehouse to the new Gagosian Gallery in London. The work was acquired by the National Gallery of Art in Washington, D.C. in the autumn of 2004. According to the National Gallery, "She has worked on every scale, defining the space between positives and negatives, public and private, and manufactured and handmade objects, always with concision, intelligence, beauty, and power."

=== House and the Turner Prize ===
In October 1993, Whiteread completed House, the cast of a Victorian terrace house. She had begun considering casting an entire house in 1991. She and James Lingwood of Artangel looked at houses to be torn down in North and East London in 1992, but without success in securing one. During this period in 1992 and 1993, Whiteread had an artist residency in Berlin with a scholarship from the DAAD Artist's Programme.

While in Berlin, she created Untitled (Room), the cast of a generic, anonymous room that she built herself. She finished the interior of a room-sized box with wallpaper, windows, and door before casting. The sculpture is in the collection of the Museum of Modern Art in New York.

House, perhaps her best-known work, was a concrete cast of the inside of an entire Victorian terraced house completed in autumn 1993, exhibited at the location of the original house – 193 Grove Road – in East London (all the houses in the street had earlier been knocked down by the council). It drew mixed responses, winning her both the Turner Prize for the best young British artist in 1993 and the K Foundation art award for the worst British artist. She was the first woman to win a Turner Prize. Tower Hamlets London Borough Council demolished House on 11 January 1994, a decision which caused some controversy itself.

=== Untitled (One Hundred Spaces) (1997) ===
For the Sensation exhibition in 1997, Whiteread exhibited Untitled (One Hundred Spaces), a series of resin casts of the space underneath chairs. This work can be seen as a descendant of Bruce Nauman's concrete cast of the area under his chair of 1965.

The critical response included:

"like a field of large glace sweets, it is her most spectacular, and benign installation to date [...] Monuments to domesticity, they are like solidified jellies, opalescent ice-cubes, or bars of soap – lavender, rose, spearmint, lilac. They look like a regulated graveyard or a series of futuristic standing stones with a passing resemblance to television sets."

— Andrew Lambirth, The Spectator, 12 October 1996.

=== Water Tower (1998) ===
In 1998, Whiteread made Water Tower as part of a grant for New York City's Public Art Fund. The piece, which is 12' 2" and 9' in diameter, was a translucent resin cast of a water tower installed on a rooftop in New York City's SoHo district. It has been called "an extremely beautiful object, which changes colour with the sky, and also a very appropriate one, celebrating one of the most idiosyncratic and charming features of the New York skyline." The piece is now in the permanent collection of the Museum of Modern Art (MoMA). Just as Ghost led on to the larger and better known House, so Water Tower led to the more public Trafalgar Square plinth work three years later.

=== Holocaust Monument a.k.a. Nameless Library (2000) ===
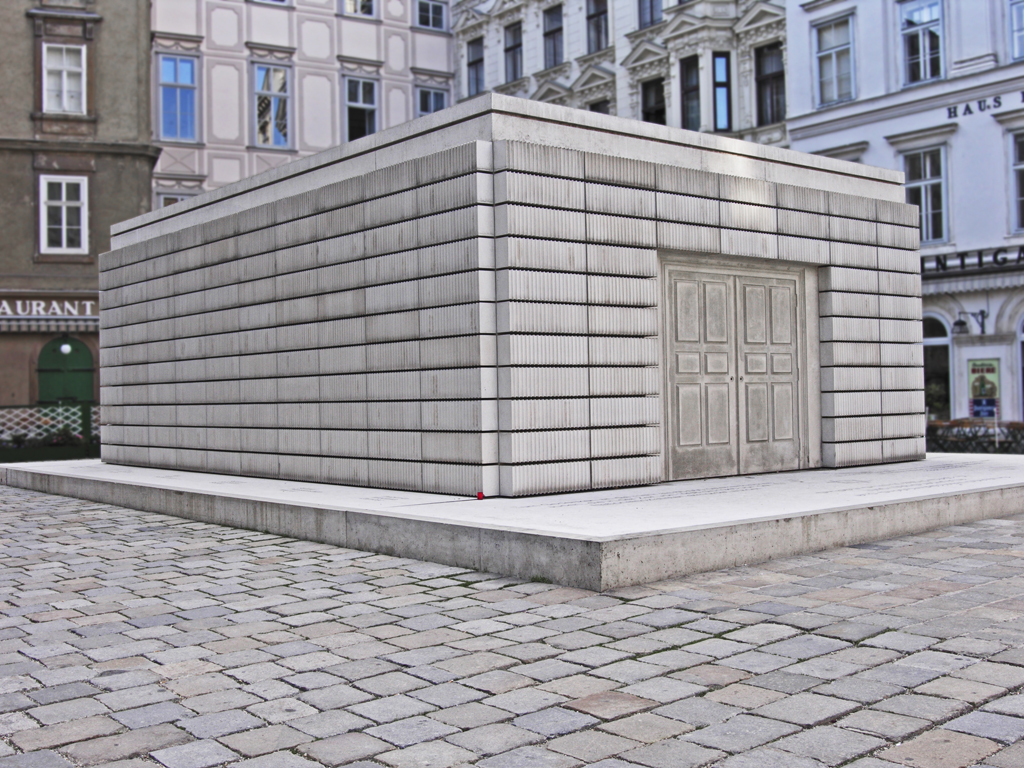
Holocaust Monument (2000) Judenplatz, Vienna

During the Holocaust, 65,000 Austrian Jews were executed, and in memory, Monument to the Victims of Fascism was a monument erected to commemorate these lost lives, however, this piece was seen as unsatisfying, so Simon Wiesenthal proposed the idea for a new memorial to the mayor of Vienna. With the condition that this memorial could not be figurative and needed to represent all 65,000 lives and the camps they were executed at, Rachel Whiteread was chosen out of ten artists to create this monument. Her monument Nameless Library was erected in Judenplatz Square in Vienna and appears to be an inside-out library. This structure was built from positively cast cement books which are placed with their spines facing inward. The inability to read these books alludes to the lost lives of the 65,000 Austrian Jews whose stories are unable to be told leaving the viewer with a sense of loss and absence. These books have also been seen as referring to the Nazi book burnings. The sculpture also does not include corners or bookshelves which further symbolizes the lack of structure and support.

Nameless Library also is constructed on the excavation grounds of Vienna's oldest synagogues which caused a lot of criticism towards the piece as many citizens felt that the grounds sufficed for the memorial itself. Some critics even accused her of stereotyping the Jewish people as "the people of the book" considering that Jewish memorials were traditionally written. This monument also questions the architectural concepts of interior and exterior as the building surrounding the square form walls, and the streets leading into it like doorways. In addition, the inverted rose ceiling works as a drainage point to the interior of the sculpture.

=== Untitled Monument (2001) ===
With Untitled Monument (2001), (also variously known as Plinth or Inverted Plinth), Whiteread became the third artist to provide a sculpture for the empty Fourth plinth in Trafalgar Square. Her sculpture was an 11-ton resin cast of the plinth itself, made by Mike Smith Studio, London, which stood upside down, creating a sort of mirror-image of the plinth. It was said to be the most massive object ever made out of resin, taking eight attempts to produce due to the resin cracking.

The work was produced in two halves, and surface blisters of the cast were repaired by picking them off and filling the small craters with a syringe of resin. Unusually for a public work, she raised funds for the piece herself by selling maquettes (small preparatory models); this was no small gesture with the mold alone costing more than £100,000 and the total cost estimated at £225,000

The critical response included:

"This dazzling anti-monument monument looks like a glass coffin, but its watery transparency relates to the large fountain that dominates the Trafalgar plaza. Following the aquatic theme, Whiteread's Monument evokes the scene of the 1805 naval battle for which the square is named."

— David Ebony, Artnet

"It's a simple trick, but an effective one, and the associations it conjures – heaviness and lightness, earth and heaven, death and life – are thought-provoking and manifold [...] Whiteread's Monument, as light and gleaming as the plinth is dark and squat, is the only one of the four commissioned pieces to allude directly to the plinth's defining emptiness. She sees it not as a space to be filled, but as an absence to be acknowledged, and she does it well."

— Ned Denny, New Statesman, 9 July 2001.

=== Embankment (2005–2006) ===
In spring 2004, she was offered the annual Unilever series commission to produce a piece for Tate Modern's vast Turbine Hall, delaying acceptance for five to six months until she was confident she could conceive of a work to fill the space. Throughout the latter half of September 2005 and mid-way through October her work Embankment was installed and was made public on 10 October.

It consists of some 14,000 translucent, white polyethylene boxes (themselves casts of the inside of cardboard boxes) stacked in various ways; some in very tall mountain-like peaks and others in lower (though still over human height), rectangular, more leveled arrangements. They are fixed in position with an adhesive. She cited the end scenes of both Raiders of the Lost Ark and Citizen Kane as visual precursors; she also spoke of the death of her mother and a period of upheaval which involved packing and moving comparable boxes.

It is also thought that her recent trip to the Arctic is an inspiration, although critics counter that white is merely the colour the polyethylene comes in, and it would have added significantly to the expense to dye them. The boxes were manufactured from casts of ten plain cardboard boxes by a company that produces grit bins and traffic bollards.

The critical response included:

"With this work Whiteread has deepened her game, and made a work as rich and subtle as it is spectacular. Whatever else it is, Embankment is generous and brave, a statement of intent."

— Adrian Searle, The Guardian, 11 October 2005.

"Everything feels surprisingly domestic in scale, the intimidating vistas of the Turbine Hall shrunk down to irregular paths and byways. From atop the walkway, it looks like a storage depot that is steadily losing the plot; from inside, as you thread your way between the mounds of blocks, it feels more like an icy maze."

— Andrew Dickson, The Guardian, 10 October 2005.

"This is another example of meritless gigantism that could be anywhere, and is the least successful of the gallery's six attempts to exploit its most unsympathetic space,"

— Brian Sewell, London Evening Standard, October 2005.

"[looks] like a random pile of giant sugar cubes [...] Luckily, the £400,000 sponsored work is recyclable."

— Stephen Moyes, Daily Mirror, 11 October 2005.

=== Charity Box (2007) ===
Whiteread created this small, plaster sculpture for a charity auction by the Prior Weston PTA, in support of the Prior Weston primary school in Islington, London.

The piece measures, a comparatively tiny, 16 cm x 11.5 cm x 11.5 cm.

=== Angel of the South (2008) ===
She was one of the five artists shortlisted for the Angel of the South project in January 2008.

=== The Gran Boathouse (2010) ===
The Gran Boathouse is located on the waters edge in Gran Norway. From a distance, it looks like any other boathouse, but closer inspection reveals that this is a work of art in concrete. The work is a cast of the interior of an old boathouse. Whiteread turns the boathouse inside out thereby capturing a moment in time. In this way, she encourages us to reflect on what we see around us. "I have mummified the air inside the boathouse," says Rachel Whiteread. "I wanted to make a shy sculpture, a sculpture that would stand there peaceful and noble." The boathouse and its interior had all the qualities that she was looking for. It represented the history of the place. The sculpture is preserving what would otherwise have been lost.

=== Rachel Whiteread Drawings (2010) ===
The Hammer Museum exhibited Whiteread's first museum retrospective of works on paper in 2010. The exhibition traveled to the Nasher Sculpture Center and the Tate Britain.

=== Work since 2012 ===
Cast from generic wooden sheds, Detached 1, Detached 2, and Detached 3 (2012) render the empty interior of a garden shed in concrete and steel. Circa 1665 (I) (2012), LOOK, LOOK, LOOK (2012) and Loom (2012) belong to a series cast from doors and windows in shades of rose, eau-de-nil, or steely resin. Propped against or affixed to walls, the sculptures glow with absorbed and reflected light.

Other works like Untitled (Amber) (2012) and Untitled (Green) (2012) are diminutive cardboard constructions mounted on graphite-marked notepaper, painted with silver leaf and complete with celluloid "windows" that refer to the resin sculptures.

=== Cabin (2016) ===
Cabin is a concrete reverse cast of a wooden shed. It has been located on Discovery Hill on Governors Island in New York Harbour since 2016. Whiteread uses this idea in order to produce a negative space that had existed but no longer does. Since Cabin is away from the noisy city, it creates a peaceful scene and a quiet sense. Cabin is said to be her first public commission in the United States that is installed permanently on the island. With this work, Whiteread wanted to "blur the notion of space even further by allowing the booming nature of the park to and hide the installation." Therefore, even though the city that is so advanced with technology and is polluted by gasoline, "nature is still present."

"What an extraordinary site, and what an honor to be asked to put something there," Whiteread states. 'I tried to imagine what one could sit there with some kind of dignity, to create a place of remembrance." She would like "to make a piece that was evocative without wanting to make a memorial to the World Trade Center."

- Rachel Whiteread

=== Nissen Hut (2018) ===
In 2018, Whiteread created the sculpture Nissen Hut at Dalby Forest as a collaboration between Forestry England and 14-18 NOW. It is one of the few permanent public artworks by Whiteread in the UK. The sculpture represents a Nissen hut, a small and practical prefabricated structure. Nissen huts had once populated the forest, providing accommodation for workers from the surrounding areas who were brought in to fight deforestation following the 1919 Forestry Act, which addressed woodland disruption after World War I. Whiteread was asked to identify buildings or structures within the forest that could commemorate the community of men who had lived and worked there.

== Other commissions ==
In 2023, Whiteread created a 31 feet tall Christmas tree covered by 102 circular neon white hoops for Carlos Place outside The Connaught hotel in London's Mayfair district which commissioned the piece.

== Exhibitions ==
From March 17–June 9, 2019, the Saint Louis Art Museum exhibited 90 of her works spanning her career.
