= List of Gloucestershire County Cricket Club grounds =

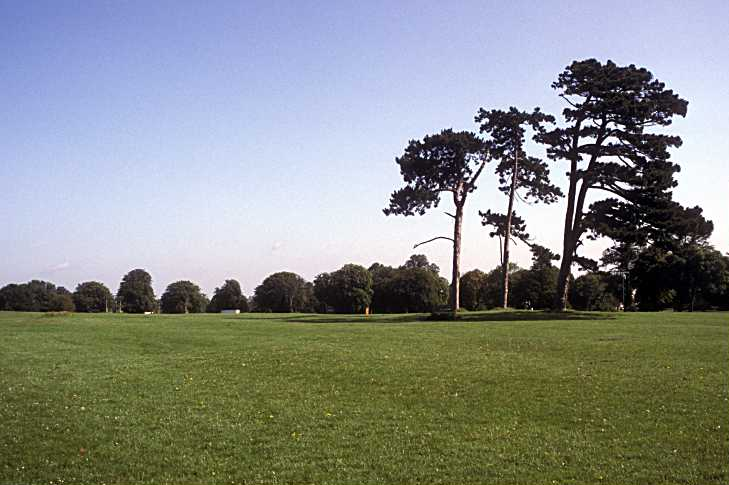
Gloucestershire's first ever match was played at Durdham Down in 1870, but it was the only time the county club played there.

Gloucestershire County Cricket Club, representing the historic county of Gloucestershire, is one of the 18 member clubs of the English County Championship. The club was established in 1846 following the merger of the Mangotsfield Cricket Club and West Gloucestershire Cricket Club and played under the latter name until 1867, after which it became the Gloucestershire County Cricket Club. It has played first-class cricket since 1870, List A cricket since 1963 and Twenty20 cricket since 2003.^{[A]} Unlike most professional sports, in which a team usually has a single fixed home ground, county cricket clubs have traditionally used different grounds in various towns and cities within the county for home matches, although the use of minor "out grounds" away from the club's main headquarters has diminished since the 1980s. Gloucestershire have played home matches at eighteen different grounds.

The club's first home match in first-class cricket was played at Durdham Down in the Clifton district of Bristol. This was the only time the county used this venue for a match. The following year Gloucestershire began to play matches at the Clifton College Close Ground in the grounds of Clifton College in the same part of the city, and this remained a regular venue for the county until the 1930s, hosting nearly 100 first-class matches. In 1872 the county used a venue outside Bristol for the first time when they played at the College Ground in the grounds of Cheltenham College. This venue has continued to be used regularly for the county's annual "Cheltenham festival" event, which in the modern era incorporates additional charity events and off-field entertainment. In 1889 Gloucestershire began to play matches at the County Ground in Bristol, which has subsequently served as the club's main headquarters and hosted the majority of the county's matches. It was here that the club played its first List A match in 1963 against Middlesex, and its first Twenty20 match forty years later against Worcestershire. Bristol is not officially part of Gloucestershire and has been considered an independent county since 1373, though it was officially part of the county of Avon from 1974 until 1996. Somerset have played first-class matches at other venues in the city.

In the 1920s Gloucestershire ceased playing at the Spa Ground in Gloucester, which had been in use since 1882, and switched to the Wagon Works Ground in the city. This ground remained in use for nearly 70 years, hosting over 150 first-class matches, until its use was discontinued in 1992. In 2012 the club investigated the possibility of returning to the Wagon Works Ground and making it their permanent headquarters after being refused permission for extensive redevelopment of the County Ground in Bristol, but ultimately this did not occur. In 1993, the club moved its base in Gloucester to Archdeacon Meadow, a ground owned by The King's School. This venue was only used for first-class matches until 2008 but was used for four Twenty20 matches in 2010 and 2011, the most recent county games to take place in the city. All subsequent matches have taken place in either Bristol or Cheltenham.

== Grounds ==
Below is a complete list of grounds used by Gloucestershire County Cricket Club for first-class, List A and Twenty20 matches. Statistics are complete through to the end of the 2020 season. Only matches played by Gloucestershire CCC at the grounds are recorded in the table. Matches abandoned without any play occurring are not included.

Name	Location	First-class			List A			Twenty20		
Name	Location	First	Last	Matches	First	Last	Matches	First	Last	Matches
Durdham Down	Clifton	2 June 1870 v Surrey	no other matches to date	1	–	–	0	–	–	0
Clifton College Close Ground	Clifton	3 August 1871 v Nottinghamshire	6 August 1932 v Indians	96	–	–	0	–	–	0
College Ground	Cheltenham	18 July 1872 v Surrey	21 July 2019 v Worcestershire	338	10 August 1969 v Worcestershire	24 July 2016 v Sussex	81	14 July 2013 v Warwickshire	25 July 2019 v Middlesex	15
Cirencester Park	Cirencester	28 August 1879 v Surrey	no other matches to date	1	–	–	0	–	–	0
Spa Ground	Gloucester	13 July 1882 v Somerset	30 May 1923 v Leicestershire	56	–	–	0	–	–	0
Batsford Road	Moreton-in-Marsh	8 May 1884 v Yorkshire	22 June 1914 v Worcestershire	6	6 May 1972 v Hampshire	14 July 1996 v Kent	21	–	–	0
East Gloucestershire Cricket Club Ground	Cheltenham	14 June 1888 v Nottinghamshire	15 June 1903 v Gentlemen of Philadelphia	2	–	–	0	–	–	0
Bristol County Ground	Bristol	1 July 1889 v Lancashire	6 September 2020 v Warwickshire	837	22 May 1963 v Middlesex	2 July 2019 v Australia A	317	14 June 2003 v Worcestershire	1 October 2020 v Northamptonshire	81
Greenbank Cricket Ground	Bristol	13 May 1922 v Sussex	28 July 1928 v Derbyshire	20	–	–	0	–	–	0
Wagon Works Ground	Gloucester	2 June 1923 v Lancashire	23 May 1992 v Somerset	155	13 July 1969 v Yorkshire	24 May 1992 v Somerset	27	–	–	0
Victoria Ground	Cheltenham	27 June 1923 v Glamorgan	10 May 1986 v Indians	20	–	–	0	–	–	0
Erinoid Ground	Stroud	9 June 1956 v Nottinghamshire	29 May 1963 v Glamorgan	14	–	–	0	–	–	0
Recreational Trust Ground	Lydney	24 August 1963 v Surrey	28 June 1969 v Sussex	8	29 June 1969 v Sussex	13 July 1975 v Glamorgan	8	–	–	0
County Ground	Swindon	–	–	0	3 May 1970 v Sussex	14 June 1992 v Kent	7^{[B]}	–	–	0
Swilgate	Tewkesbury	–	–	0	3 September 1972 v Yorkshire	9 September 1973 v Lancashire	2	–	–	0
County Ground	Trowbridge	–	–	0	16 July 1989 v Hampshire	no other matches to date	1^{[C]}	–	–	0
Dowty Arle Court	Cheltenham	–	–	0	21 April 1992 v Leicestershire	23 April 1992 v Minor Counties	2	–	–	0
Archdeacon Meadow	Gloucester	27 May 1993 v Worcestershire	30 May 2008 v Warwickshire	15	30 May 1993 v Worcestershire	13 June 2004 v Northamptonshire	11	11 June 2010 v Sussex	11 June 2011 v Surrey	4

== Notes ==
A. First-class cricket matches are designed to be contested over multiple days, with each team permitted two innings with no limit to the number of overs in an innings. List A matches, also known as limited overs or one-day matches, are intended to be completed in a single day and restrict each team to a single innings of between 40 and 60 overs, depending on the specific competition. Twenty20 matches restrict each team to a single innings of 20 overs.

B. The County Ground, Swindon is located in the adjacent county of Wiltshire.

C. The County Ground, Trowbridge is located in the adjacent county of Wiltshire.
