= History of Bath City F.C. =

History of an English football club

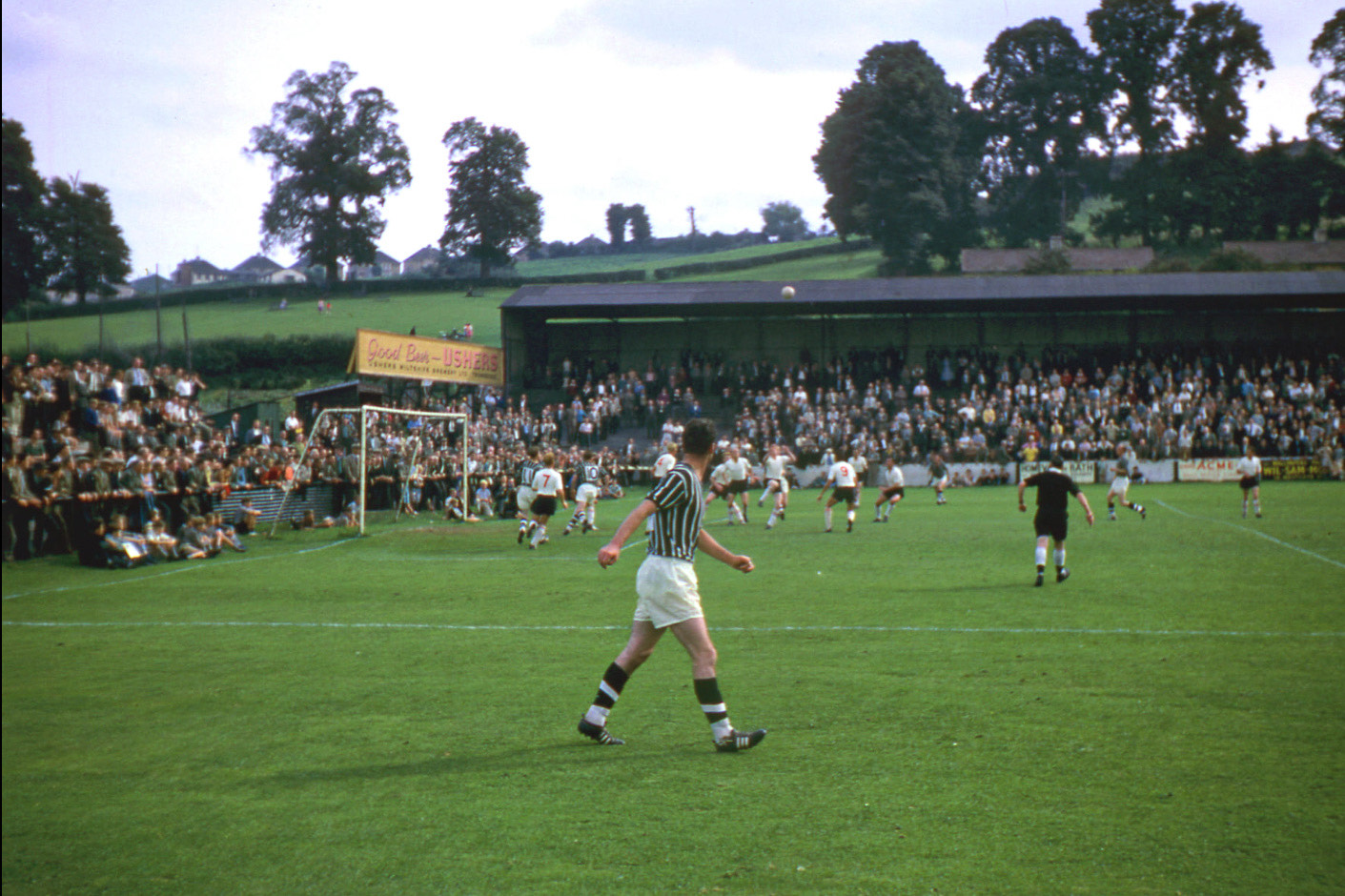
A match at Twerton Park in 1962

Bath City Football Club is a semi-professional football club based in Bath, Somerset, England. The club was founded in 1889 as Bath AFC, and changed its name to Bath City in 1905. The club has never played in the Football League, though Bath were heavily discussed as an entrant in the 1930s and 1940s, and came closest via election in 1978 and 1985. During the Second World War, the club won the Football League North.

Bath have reached the third round of the FA Cup six times, beating league sides such as; Crystal Palace (in 1931), Millwall (in 1959), and Cardiff City (in 1992). Bath City were crowned Southern League champions in 1960 and 1978; one of the highest levels of non-League football at the time. After a period of relative decline in the 1990s whilst in the Conference, Bath were demoted to the seventh tier in 2004. They were promoted back to the Conference in 2010, though were relegated in 2012 and have played in the National League South since.

== Early years and rise to the Southern League (1889–1925) ==
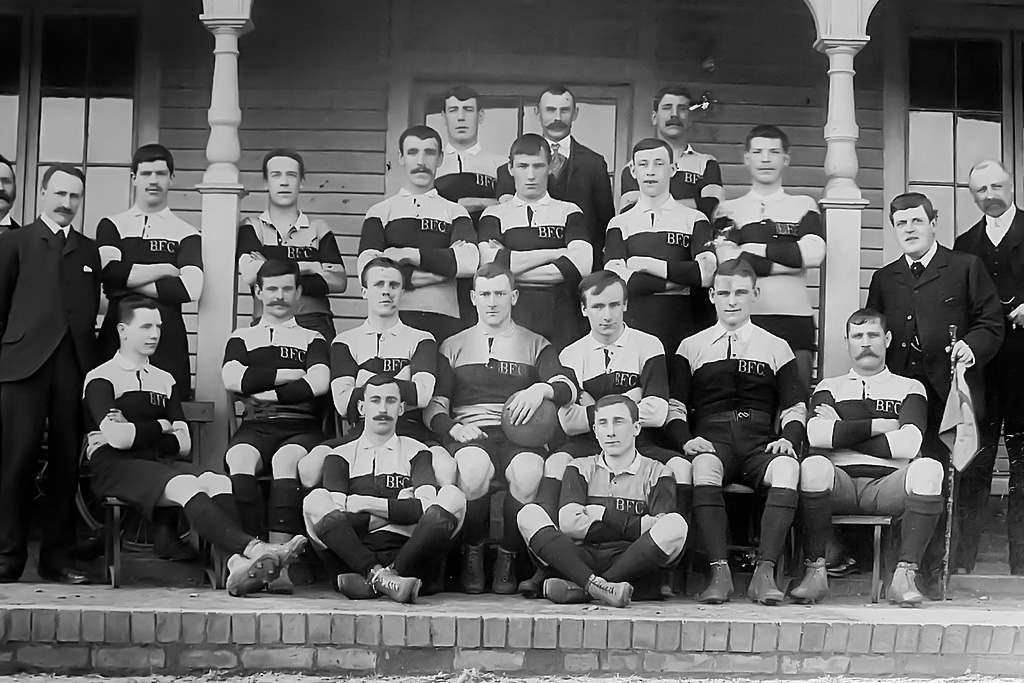
The first ever Bath City squad, taken in 1890 at the North Parade Ground in Bathwick.

Football in a form vaguely recognisable to the modern eye first reached Bath in the late 1880s, when students at Prior Park college began kicking a ball about in idle curiosity. On 19 July 1889 Bath City were formed as Bath AFC (Bath Association Football Club) at the Christopher hotel in the city, a group of men met to consider forming an association club. A man named Mr Cater formed the club and the team commenced play at the North Parade Ground in Bathwick, just east of the city center by the river Avon. Bath competed in their first ever recorded match on 10 October 1889, in which they lost 9–4 to Trowbridge Town at The North Parade Ground. The first game that Bath AFC played away 20 was days later, against Eastville Rovers in Clifton, Bristol in front of a crowd of 5,000 on 30 October 1889. Fixtures in the club's primordial season included ties against the likes of, Weston-super-Mare, Swindon and Gloucester.

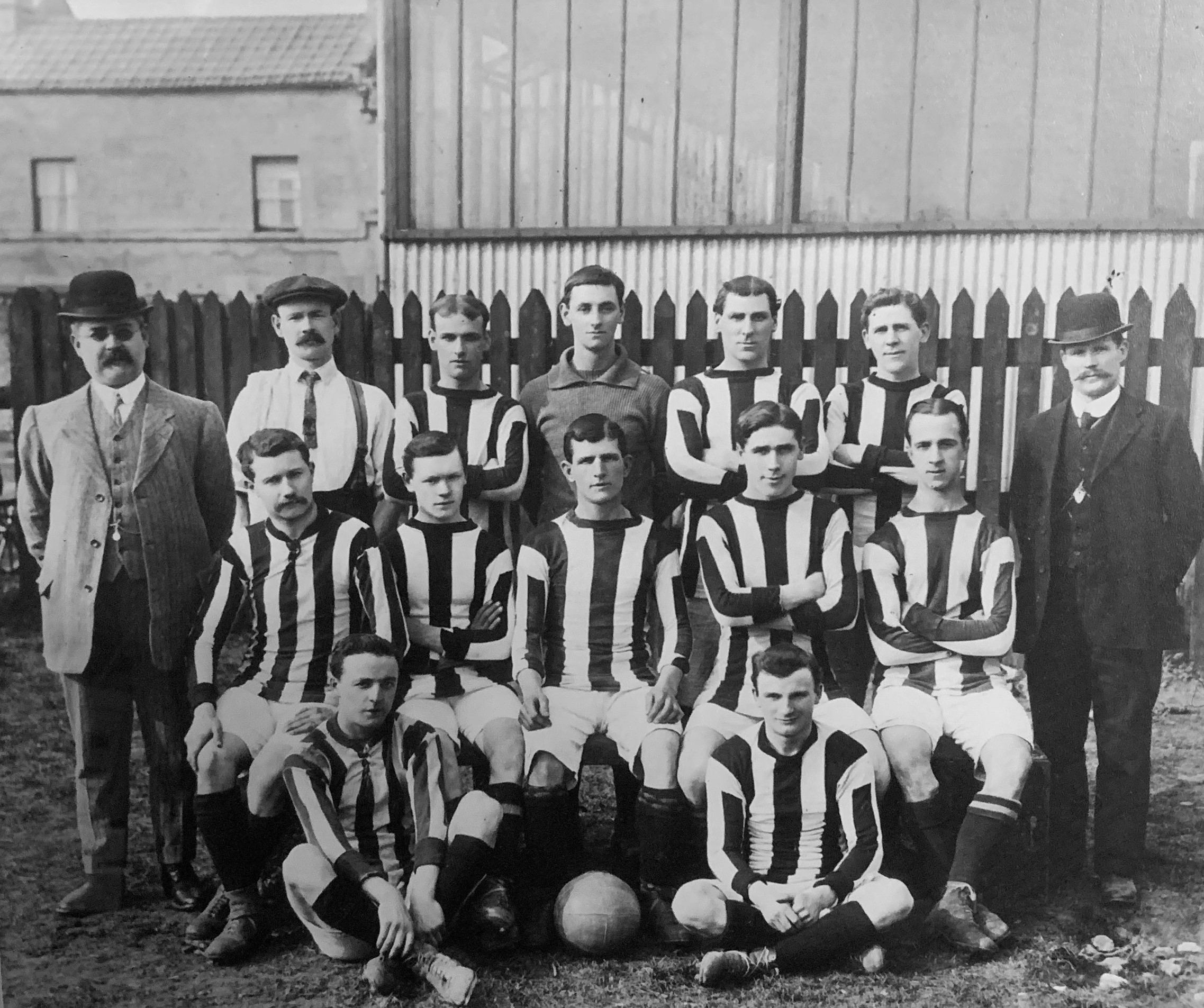
1910–11 squad, in which they finished third in the Western League Division Two.

By 1891, the club was struggling heavily financially. As a consequence, it was put forward that Bath AFC amalgamate with the local rugby club; Bath Football Club. For an entire nine years the club ceased play. Until, on 11 September 1900, Bath AFC was re-formed by members of the Bath Association Cricket Club, led by eventual player, William Hyman. A large meeting was called at the Railway Hotel, on James Street in the city centre, to discuss, and in a viable form, an association football team to represent the city of Bath. The meeting was a success and Bath City FC, by name, was officially born. Hyman went on to score 131 goals for Bath in the early 20th century, making him, to this day, the club's second all-time top goal scorer, he also frequently acted as the club's honorary secretary in board meetings. The headquarters and changing rooms would be near the ground at the Belvoir Castle pub.

During the meeting at The Railway Hotel in which the club was formed, members suggested that the team's attire ought to be blue shorts and white shirts, though, these colours only lasted for a short while. In 1900, the club bought The Belvoir Castle Ground in East Twerton, next to the railway line and not too far from the River Avon. Concurrently, the club entered competitive football, commencing play in The Wiltshire League, finishing seventh in their first season. They changed names from Bath City to Bath Railway in 1902. That year, an annual competition known as the "Bath District League" was formed, in which the club competed against fellow local Bath clubs, such as Bath Rovers, Weston All Saints and Twerton Saint Michaels. On 26 July 1905, the club altered names for the final time, in which they reverted to "Bath City FC"; the name has remained unchanged to the present day.

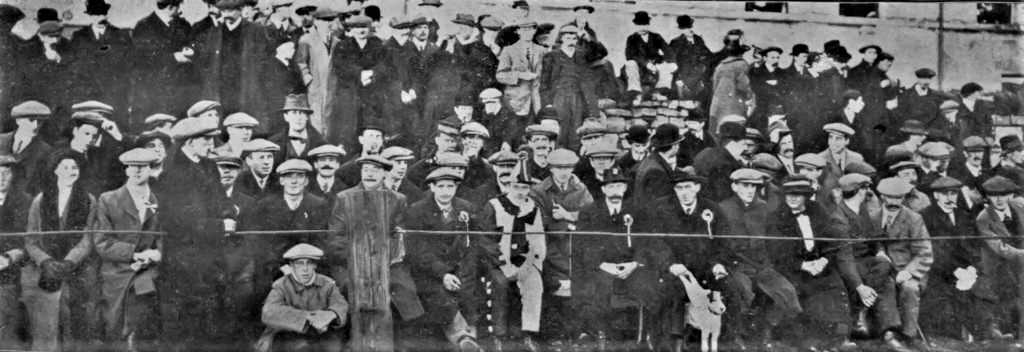
Bath fans watching a match in the cold of January in 1914 at the now demolished Belvoir Castle ground in Oldfield Park

The following year, the club joined The Bristol and District League Division One, in which they remained for two years. In 1908, Bath club joined a multi-county division for the first time, joining the Western League Division Two. After moving to a higher division, the club decided to field their reserve team for the Bath District League, instead of the first. In 1909, Charles Pinker was appointed manager, and that year, the club moved up to The Western League Division One. Bath finished third at this level in the 1910–11 season. They then went on to rank second in The Western League Division One during the 1913–14 season.

Five years later, Bath City departed both The Belvoir Castle and Twerton, for the Lambridge Show Ground in Larkhall next to the River Avon. Bath remained in the Western League until 1921, in which they joined the English Section of the Southern League, regarded as the strongest division outside of the Football League League at the time. More than 4,000 saw the club's first ever game in the Southern League, a 2–1 defeat to Swindon Town. In 1921, manager Charles Pinker left the club after a successful twelve-year period. He was replaced by former Swindon Town player, Billy Tout, who led the club into the top division of non-League football for the first time. Tout retained this role until 1925.

== Ted Davis and missing out on Football League (1925–1958) ==
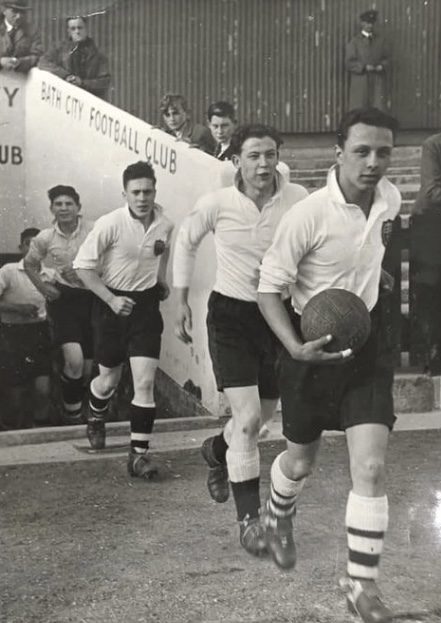
Bath players entering the pitch from the Grandstand of Twerton Park in the 1930s

Pinker was re-appointed at Bath City in 1925, though he failed to capture the same success in the Southern League as he had done in The Western League, finishing fourteenth and then eleventh. In August 1926, the club were on the brink of extinction, partly, due to the fans being "disheartened by the ill-fortune of recent seasons" and the lack of "sufficient backing". However, on 21 August 1926, there was a large meeting, consisting mostly of the club's supporters and officials. Due to the appointment of a new committee, and the increase in the number of supporters' club shareholders, the required £500 sum was met, and the club was "saved". A year later, Ted Davis was appointed at Bath City. In 1929, Davis won the club their first competitive trophy, The Somerset Cup.

The following season, the team finished Southern League runners up, losing 3–2 in the play off final to Eastern Section Champions Aldershot Town. Making them less applicable for election to the Third Division. The season was labelled "the best in the club's history" by the Bath Chronicle at the time. In 1932, the club returned to Twerton, and started playing home games at the newly built Twerton Park, with the community laying out flags and bunting the length of the High Street to "celebrate the return of football to the area."

The first game at the new ground was a match between Bristol Rovers Reserves and Bath City in the Southern League. The general feeling was one of relief, summed up by the Chronicle's headline "All's Well With Bath City." Bath won 2–0 in front of 2,936. Manager Ted Davis's new signing, Reg Trotman, a man whose football reputation had been made at Rovers, knocked in both goals for an "easy victory".

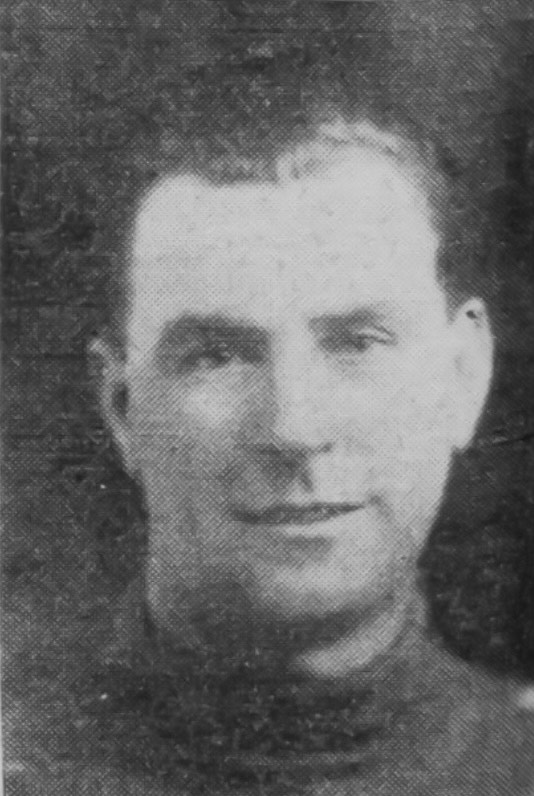
Ted Davis is the club's longest serving manager.

Bath came Southern league runners up for a second time in 1933, losing the title to Eastern Section Champions Norwich City reserves 2–1. During this period, the club were heavily being discussed for entry into the Football League Third Division. In 1937, Davis left Bath for Colchester United. The team remained in the Southern League until 1939, with former Liverpool player and Scottish international, Alex Raisbeck as first team coach from 1938 to 1939. Raisbeck left to be replaced by Ted Davis, his second spell at Bath.

In the summer of 1939, Arthur Mortimer was appointed as the club's new chairman. Upon the Outbreak of the Second World War, the club were accepted to join the temporary Football League North, competing with the likes of Liverpool, Manchester United, Aston Villa and Everton. That season the club competed in their highest attended game to date, playing Aston Villa at Villa Park in front of over 30,000. The team finished the eventual champions under Davis, thereby becoming the only semi-professional side ever to win a Football League trophy.

During the 1941–42 season, Bath wore numbers for the very first time, playing Lovells Athletic in January in front of 5,000. In 1944, the club were, once again, in talks for entry into the English Football League, with the aim of being admitted into either the Third Division, or the planned Fourth Division, which had not yet been established. Bath were told during a meeting at the Guildhall by one of the leading members of the Football League reconstructing committee, that the opportunity to join the planned fourth division was " Bath's for the asking".

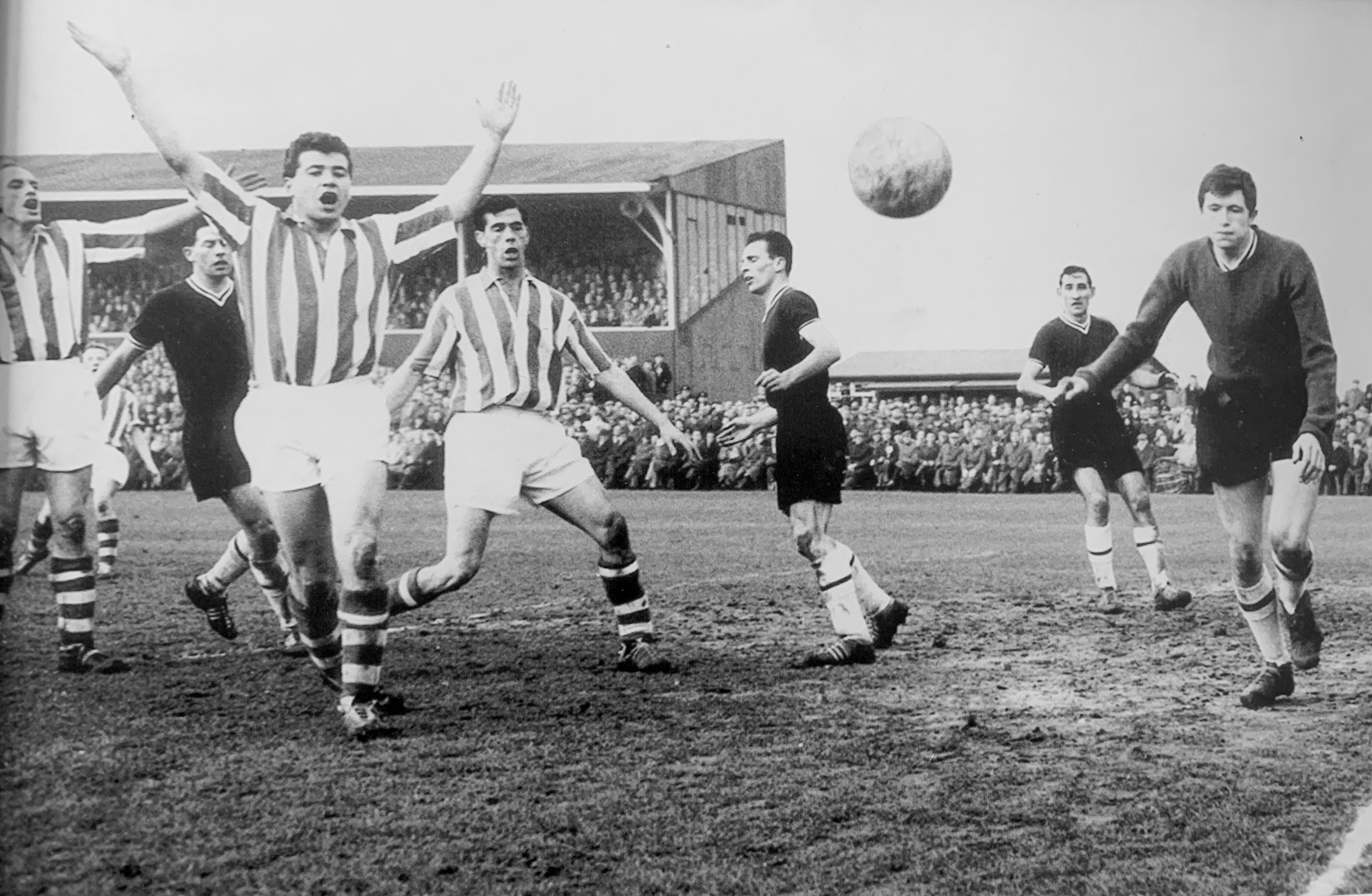
A match at Twerton Park in the 1950s

At the time, Twerton Park was also in heavy discussion for expansion, to a capacity of 40,000, in aim to become; "a stadium worthy of the city and the west". However, on 27 July 1945, the Football League's management committee refused to allow any non-league clubs into the Third Division, despite Third League clubs "wanting Bath City to join". Thus, after the War, with the resumption of competitive football, they were forced to resume playing in the Southern League, and the plans to make Twerton Park one of the largest stadiums in the West Country were abandoned. Ted Davis, then left the club in 1947. In total, Davis spent 17 years as first team coach, becoming the club's longest serving manager.

Following his departure, the 1950s saw a large array of different coaches manage the club. Vic Woodley was the first to succeed Davis, appointed on 6 June 1947. Though he left in 1950 after four mid-lower placed finishes, and was replaced by Eddie Hapgood. Attendances on average during the 1940s and 1950s were some of the highest recorded in the club's history. Notable large home attendances during this period included; 17,000 in 1944 vs Aston Villa 14,000 vs Southend United in the 1952–53 season and 11,700 at Twerton Park against rivals Yeovil Town in 1957. In 1956, Hapgood left the club and was replaced by Paddy Sloan, who only remained for the 1956–57 season.

== The Charlie Fleming, and yoyo years (1958–1997) ==

The 1958–59 Bath City team, containing several of the most well known players to ever play for the club.

Sloan was replaced by Bob Hewison in 1957. The succeeding year, a reform similar to that of 1920 took place; a new Fourth Division was formed. Thereupon, The Southern league descended the pyramid. By 1959, Bath were once again being heavily discussed for election to The Football League. However the chairman at the time, Arthur Mortimer, believed that "the league suited the club" he stated that: "We are providing better football here than most spectators get in the lower divisions of the Football League."

Hewison built arguably the strongest side in the club's history, signing players such as Alan Skirton, Ian MacFarlane and Ian Black, Stan Mortensen and Tony Book, captained by Charlie Fleming. The team went on to win the league in the 1959–60 season, winning the trophy at Twerton Park on the last day of the season against rivals Yeovil Town, finishing on 67 points (in 42 matches), with the division still being viewed as; "The foremost non-League competition."

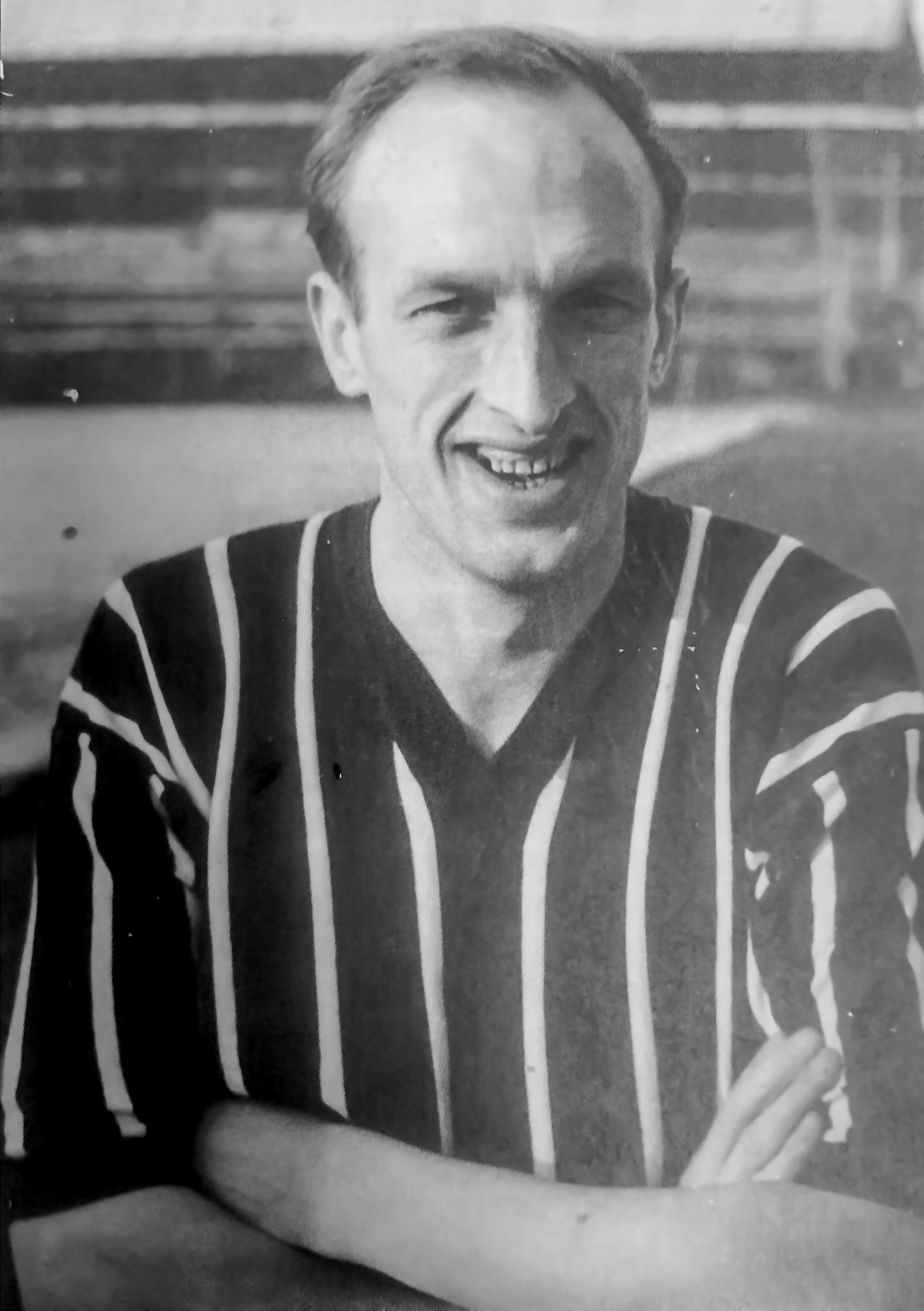
The club's record all-time goal scorer, Charlie Fleming pictured in black and white stripes in 1961

The club had one of the best cup runs in its history that same season, beating Millwall in the FA Cup first round, with Millwall manager Reg Smith describing the game as "brutal, the roughest I've seen in 20 years." and then Notts County in the second. In the third round, Bath went on to play Brighton & Hove Albion at Twerton Park, in front of a record crowd of 18,020,, but lost 1–0. Hewison rose as the second most successful manager in the club's history, a title in which he held until 1978. In 1962, Bath finished second in the Southern League four points behind Oxford United.

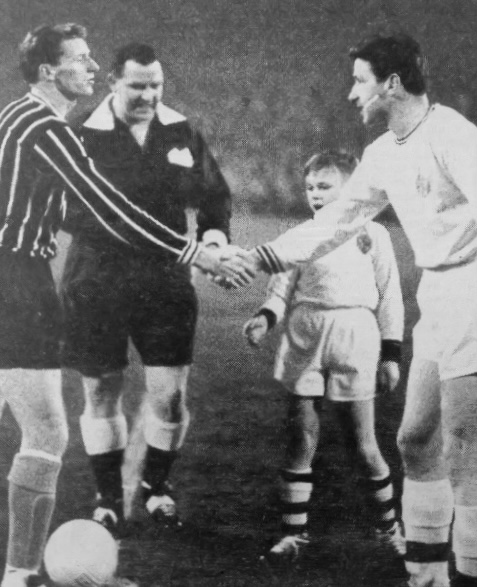
Bath City captain Tony Book shaking hands with Bolton captain in the FA cup third round in 1964, in front of 26,000 at Burnden Park.

Two years after Hewison's departure in the spring of 1961, former Manchester City player Malcolm Allison was appointed manager after Arthur Cole's dismissal in 1963. Though Allison won no silverware with the club, in the 1963–64 season, with Tony Book as club captain, Bath finished in third place, and reached the third round of the FA Cup. He left the club in 1964 and then went on to manage league sides, including, Plymouth Argyle and Manchester City.

In 1965, under Welsh manager Ivor Powell, the club were relegated for the first time in their history. They were then promoted back to the Southern League Premier Division that year, though were poor in the 1966–67 season and finished 19th, being relegated from the Southern League Premier for a second time in three years. Powell was replaced by Arnold Rodgers on 25 February 1967. In the 1968–69 season they won promotion back to the Premier Division, finishing second. From 1964 to 1974 Bath City became a yo-yo club, being relegated from, and promoted back to the Premier Division on six occasions. On 10 August 1976, Brian Godfrey was appointed as manager.

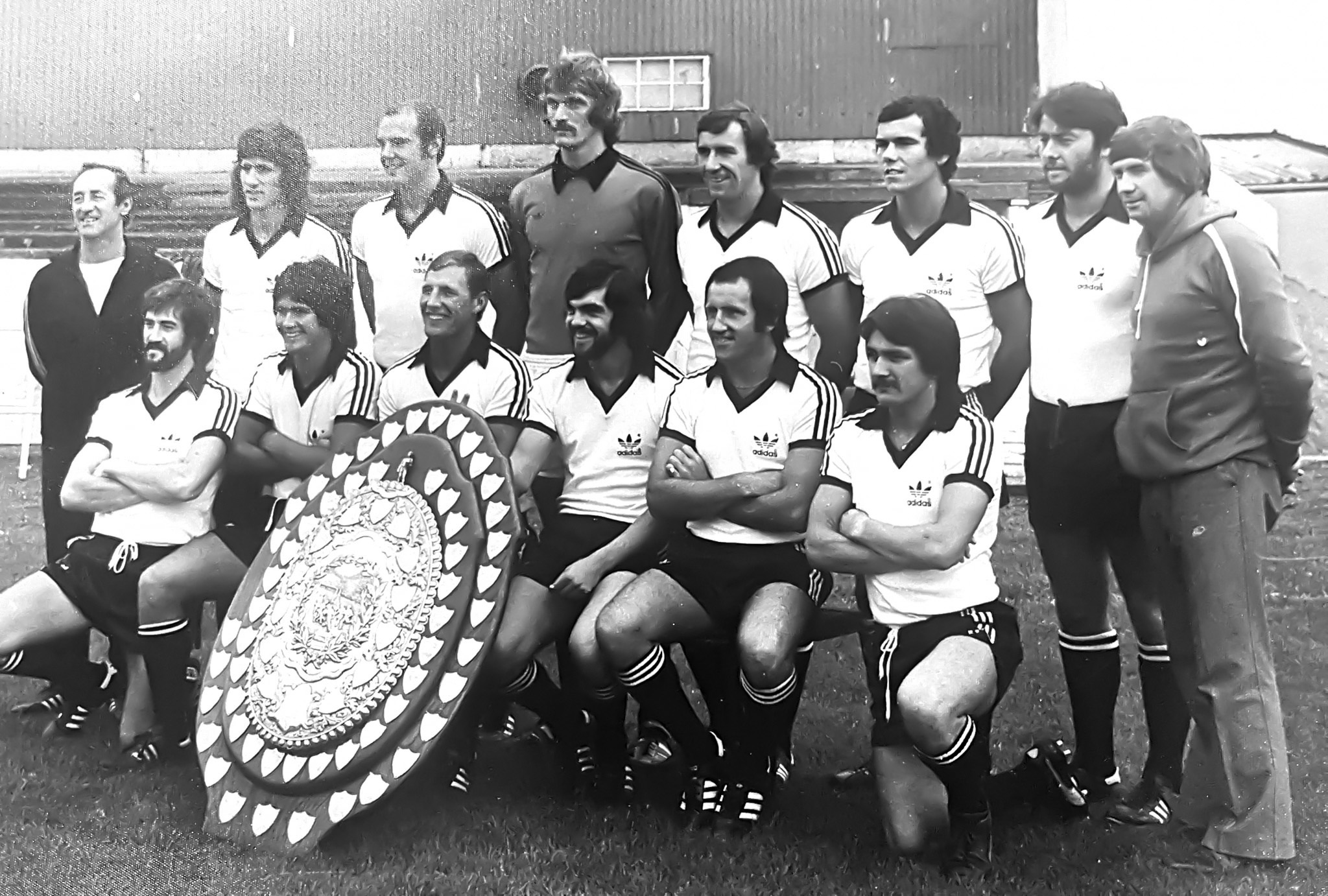
The 1977–78 team at Twerton Park with Southern League trophy

Two years into his reign, in the 1977–78 season, the team won the Southern League title for a second time, clinching the title at Leamington. It was there that Godfrey's "superbly talented side" lifted the cup in front of hordes of travelling fans. Under Godfrey, the club made it to two Anglo-Italian Cup finals In 1977 and 1978; In 1977, they lost to Udinese Calcio and then in 1978 to affiliated club Calcio Lecco. Godfrey averaged a league position of third, and won Bath City's last "major" non-League trophy, making him the club's second most successful manager of all time. Though finishing first, they fell short of election to the Football League by three votes in 1978, with Wigan Athletic gaining 26 and Bath 23. As a result, the club became founding members of the Alliance Premier League, now the National League.

The club finished runners-up in 1985 but champions Wealdstone did not meet Football League stadium capacity requirements, so Bath City were allowed to apply for election to the Fourth Division. However, they missed out on election to the Football League for a third time. On this occasion, gaining only 8 votes. In 1986, Bristol Rovers were forced out of Eastville, officials of both clubs reached an agreement to share Twerton Park. This instigated developments to the ground as it, at one point, hosted second-tier football. Rovers ultimately moved back to Bristol after a ten-year period.

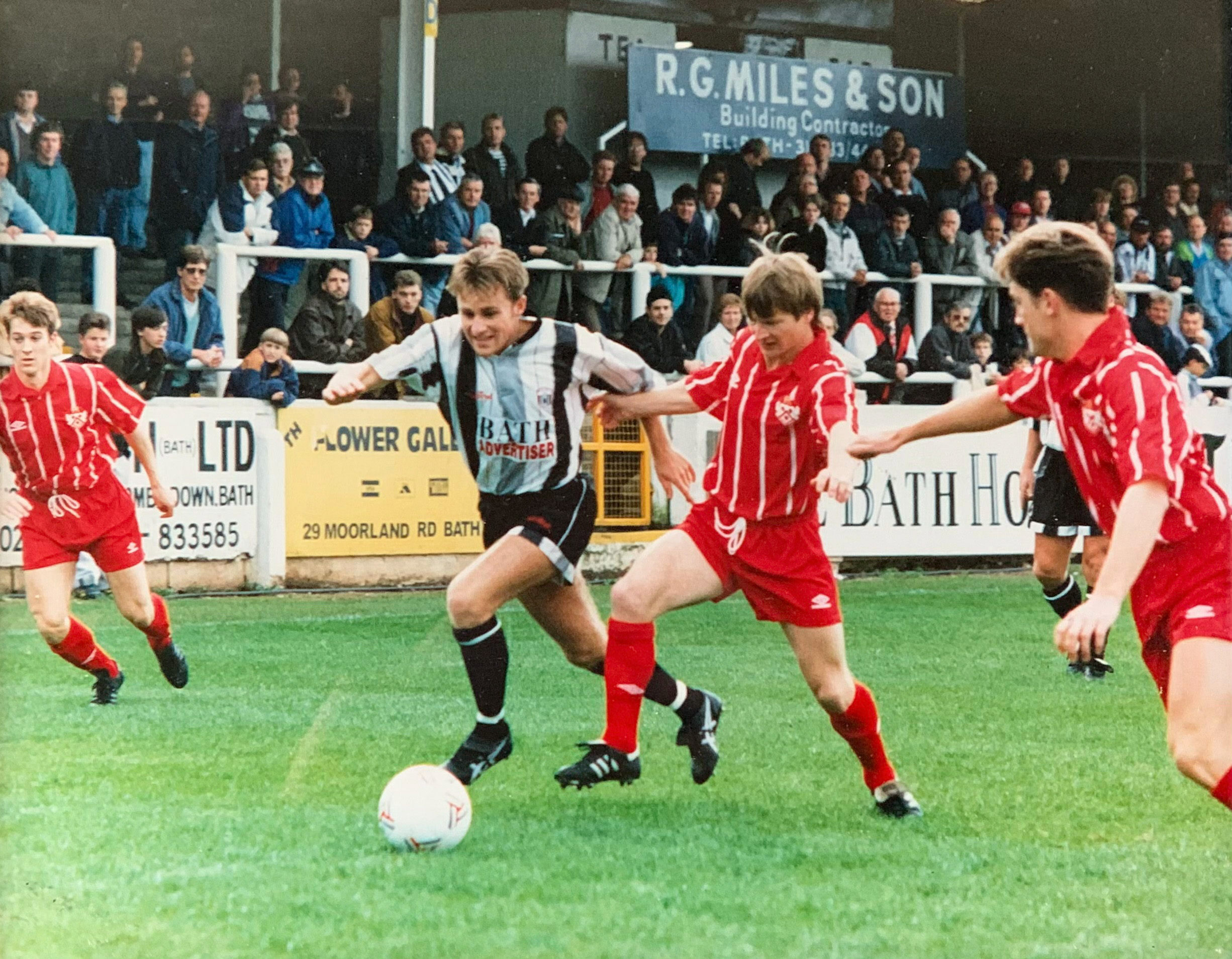
Bath versus Kettering Town in the Conference 1992

Bath were relegated from the Conference back to the Southern League in 1988; now the sixth tier. Nevertheless, the club were promoted back two seasons later. In 1991 Tony Ricketts was appointed manager, replacing George Rooney. They reached the third round of the FA Cup during the 1993–94 season, on 5 December 1993, the second round tie against Hereford United was broadcast live on Sky Sports. The club won 2–1, progressing to the next round. However, they lost 4–1 to Stoke City at Twerton Park in the third in front of 7,000 fans. They remained in the Conference from 1991 to 1997, though only managed several mid-placed finishes.

== Decline and subsequent relegation (1997–2017) ==
Ricketts's departure in 1996 was followed the appointment of Welsh manager Paul Bodin. Following decades of playing in the top division of non-League football, the club were relegated from the 1996–97 Football Conference. As a result, Bath returned to the Southern League; albeit it no longer acted as step one of the non-League pyramid. In 2001, Bodin was replaced by Alan Pridham. However Pridham only lasted until 2003, after being sacked in November due to a poor run of results. In 2004, the club lost in the FA Cup second round to Peterborough United and in the third round of the FA Trophy to Canvey Island. With the formation of the Conference South in 2004, the Southern league lowered in rank once again; to the seventh division. As a result, Bath were demoted, albeit, without being relegated. Subsequently, they ended up playing the lowest tier football in the club's history from 2004 to 2007, having never previously played below the sixth tier. John Relish was appointed manager on 22 June 2005.

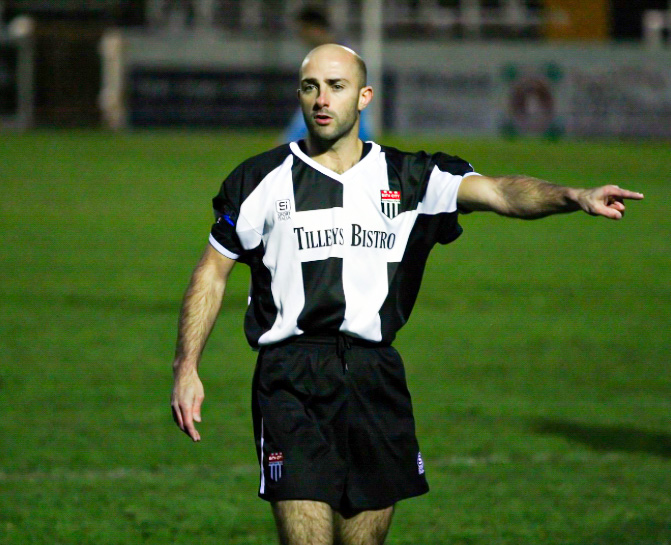
Scott Partridge made over 130 appearances for the club between 2004 and 2008.

The club narrowly missed out on promotion to the Conference South in the season 2005–06 season finishing second in the Southern League. Though, the subsequent year, they were promoted back to the sixth tier by winning the Southern League in 2006–07, finishing on 91 points. Bath then finished eighth in the Conference South during the 2007–08 season. A year later, manager John Relish was replaced by his former assistant Adie Britton. In 2009, the club beat League Two side Grimsby Town in the FA Cup first round, only to lose to Forest Green Rovers in the second round. On 9 May 2010, Bath reached the National League South play-off final, in which they played Woking. The club won 1–0 and returned to the fifth tier for the first time since 1997. Bath finished tenth in the 2010–11 Football Conference, their highest finish since achieving seventh in the 1992–93 Football Conference.

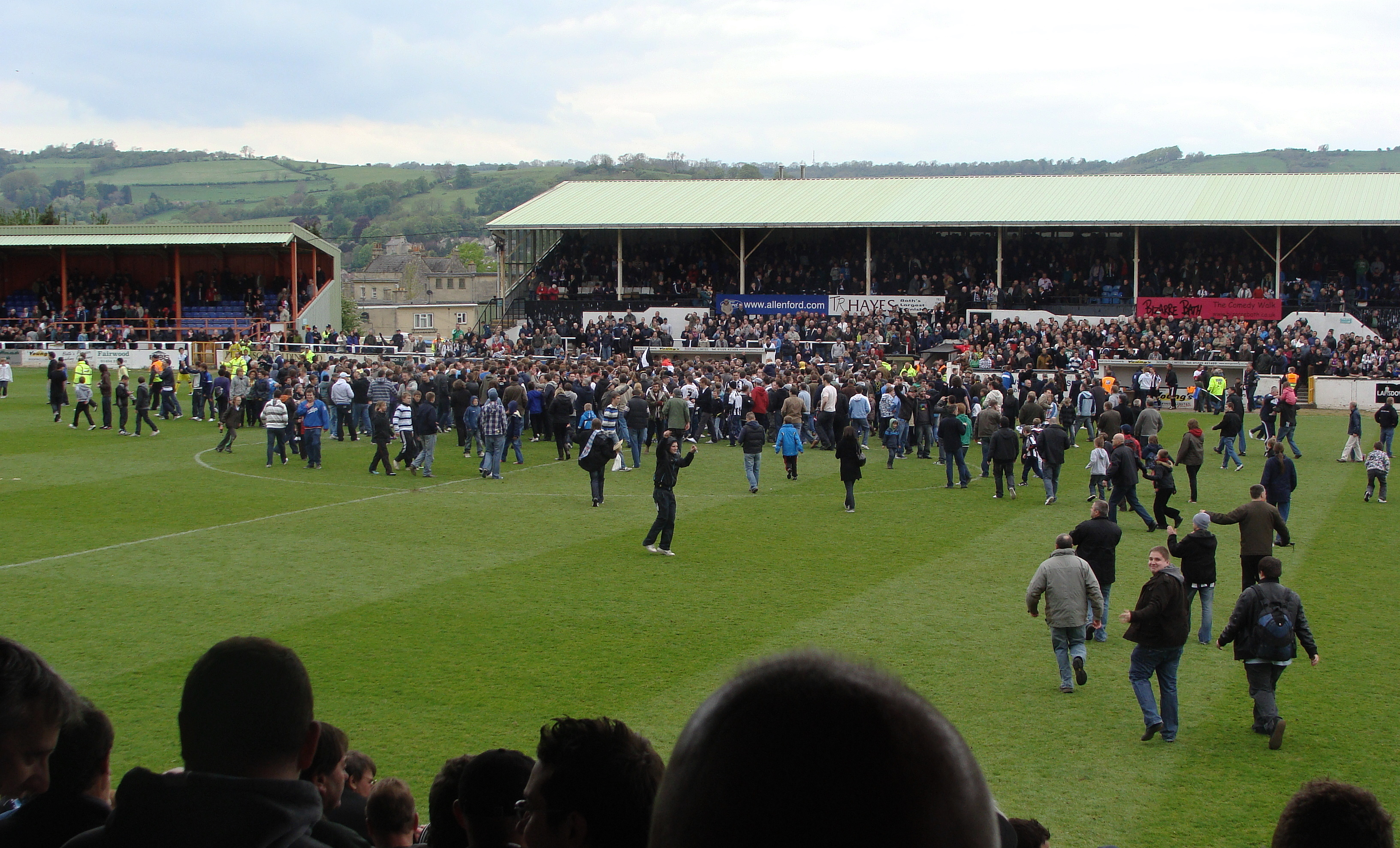
Fans pitch invade after the club gained promotion to the Conference in 2010

However, they had a poor season in 2011–12 and were relegated from the Conference. Following the demotion, Bath's chairman at the time, Manda Rigby, held talks with manager Adie Britton on the future of the club, stating the team would; "return stronger with the experience." Yet the chairman's promise to get back into the National League failed to materialise, with the club finishing in twelfth place in the 2012–13 season. Britton, subsequently stepped down from being the first team coach, and acquired the role of football director, stating that he "aims to get Bath City back to where they belong." Britton was replaced by Australian manager, Lee Howells.

The following season was an improvement, with the club finishing seventh on 66 points in 2013–14. However, for the following two years, they were poor again, finishing fourteenth on 53 points in both the 2014–15 and 2015–16 season. During this period, the club's home attendances also declined greatly, averaging as low as 500 during the 2014–15 season. From 2011 to 2016 home attendances were some of the lowest recorded in the club's entire history. What little success the club had during this period was in the 2014–15 season, reaching the semi-final of the FA Trophy, beating Bristol Rovers, on route to losing on penalties to eventual winners, North Ferriby United. Howells eventually resigned after a 4–1 defeat to Dartford, due to a run of low placed finishes.

== The Gill Era (2017–present) ==
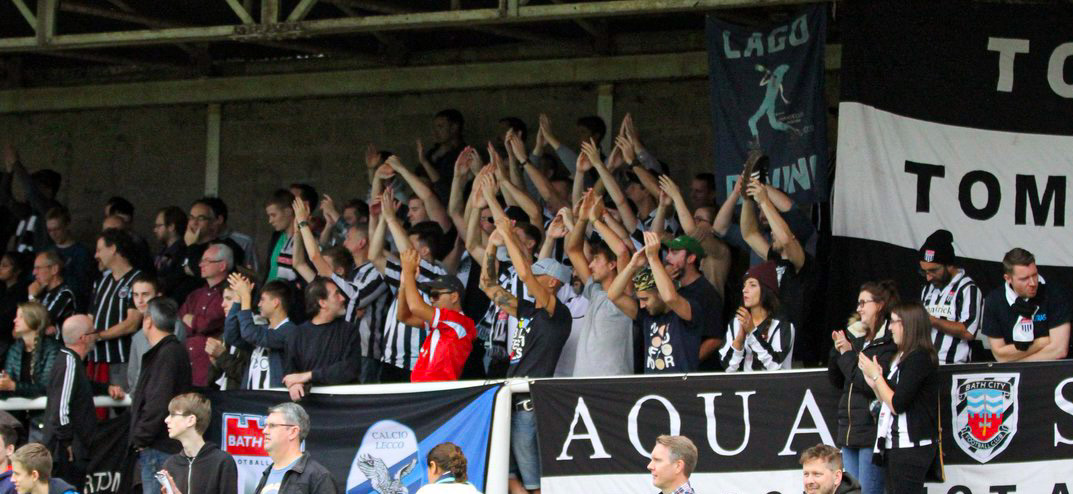
Bath fans on The Popular Side stand of Twerton Park during Gill's first month as head coach.

On 5 October 2017, former player, Jerry Gill, was appointed first team manager. The first season under Gill saw the club finish in ninth, the same as the previous 2016–17 season. However, it was not until later that there was a noticeable improvement in the team's performances. In the 2018–19 National League South season the club finished fifth, on 71 points, a feat that had not been accomplished since the 2009–10 promotion season. Subsequently, they entered play offs to compete for a place in the National League, but lost 3–1 to Wealdstone on the first May 2019. The club climbed once spot higher up the table again in 2019–20, finishing fourth. However, the team were beaten 2–1 by Dorking Wanderers in the play-off eliminator at Twerton Park.

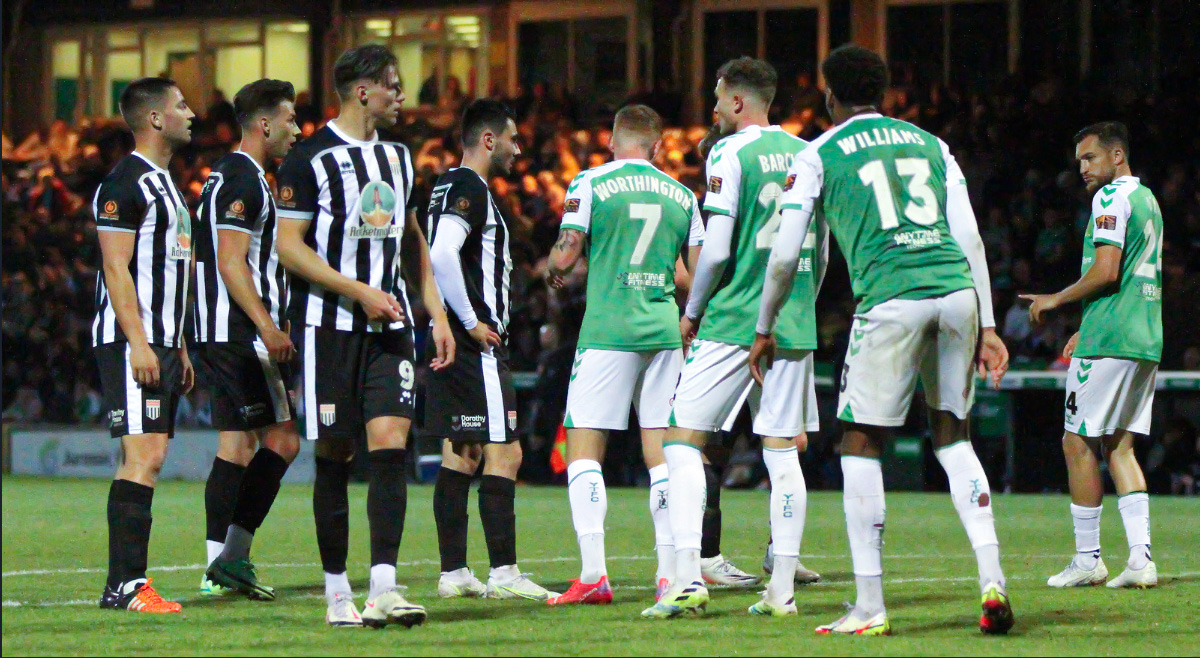
Bath City vs Yeovil in 2022 at Huish Park in the Somerset Cup final

Attendances also rose greatly, from the club averaging 612 in the 2016–17 season to 1,142 in the 2018–19 season. They also witnessed the highest league attendance in 40 years vs Torquay United, on 19 January 2019, with a crowd of 3,492. Bath won the game 3–2. Though it looked as though the club were edging closer to ending their longest spell in the sixth tier, following the outbreak of the COVID-19 pandemic, Bath finished 18th twice in both the 2020–21 and 2021–22 season, the club's second lowest finishes of all time. The club improved in the 2022–23 season, gaining 67 points and finishing in 11th place, the team also won The Somerset Premier Cup for a record 25th time on 1 May 2023.
