= Assad Fudadin =

Guyanese cricketer

Personal information
- Full name: Assad Badyr Fudadin
- Born: 1 August 1985 (age 41); Rose Hall, Berbice, Guyana
- Batting: Left-handed
- Bowling: Right-arm medium-fast
- Role: Batsman

International information
- National side: West Indies
- Test debut (cap 294): 7 June 2012 v England
- Last Test: 5 August 2012 v New Zealand

Domestic team information
- Years: Team
- 2005–2021: Guyana
- 2015–2017: Guyana Amazon Warriors (squad no. 15)

Career statistics
Competition	Test	FC	LA	T20
Matches	3	110	68	16
Runs scored	122	5,208	1,652	241
Batting average	30.50	29.42	28.48	26.77
100s/50s	0/1	6/24	2/12	0/1
Top score	55	145	107	54
Balls bowled	30	1,598	216	18
Wickets	–	23	5	1
Bowling average	–	34.95	32.00	31.00
5 wickets in innings	–	0	0	0
10 wickets in match	–	0	0	0
Best bowling	–	4/42	2/28	1/31
Catches/stumpings	4/–	74/–	21/–	5/–
- Source: ESPNcricinfo, 9 October 2021

Assad Badyr Fudadin (born 1 August 1985) is a Guyanese former cricketer who played for the Guyana national team and the West Indies. Born in Guyana, he batted left-handed and bowled right-arm medium-fast.

In 2000, he was selected to play for the West Indies Under-15s team at the Costcutter Under-15s World Challenge, at which he top-scored in the final with 55 off 92 balls as the West Indies beat Pakistan. The following year, he progressed to the Guyana Under-19s team, for which he played for two years before being selected for the West Indies U19s.

Fudadin made his first-class debut in 2004, playing for the West Indies B team against Kenya in the 2003–04 Carib Beer Cup. The following season, he returned to play for Guyana in the same competition, before going to England in April 2005 to play a season of club cricket for Wollaton Cricket Club in the Nottinghamshire Cricket Board Premier League. After his spell at Wollaton CC, he spent three years from 2006 to 2008 playing for Trowbridge Cricket Club in West of England Premier League Premier 2. During that time, he scored 2,659 runs at an average of 85.77 and took 60 wickets at an average of 26.53.

After a few years playing domestic cricket in the West Indies, Fudadin was called into the West Indies A team in 2010 for a home series against Zimbabwe and then a tour of England before another home series against Pakistan A. His exploits earned him a developmental contract with the West Indies Cricket Board.

In 2012, Fudadin received a call-up to the senior West Indies side for their summer tour of England. After being unused for the first two matches, he made his Test debut in the third match, the start of which was delayed by two days due to rain.

After being absent for the 2016 competition, he was selected once again by the Guyana Amazon Warriors for the 2017 CPL, this time as a 12th-round pick in the draft. In June 2021, he was selected to take part in the Minor League Cricket tournament in the United States following the players' draft.
