= Trowbridge Cricket Club =

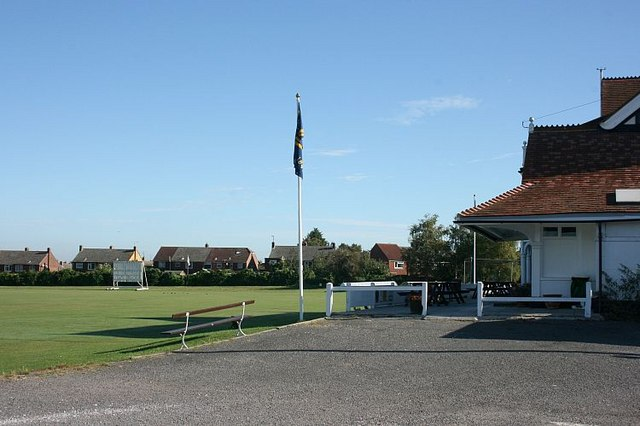
- Trowbridge Cricket Club Pavilion

Team information
- Home venue: Trowbridge Cricket Club Ground

History
- Notable players: Assad Fudadin, David Brown, Johan Fourie
- Official website: www.trowbridge.cc

Trowbridge Cricket Club is a cricket club in Trowbridge, Wiltshire, England, accredited by the England and Wales Cricket Board as a clubmark club and also a focus club. It has three adult teams and a youth section ranging from under-nines to under-fifteens. The 1st XI plays in the West of England Premier League, Wiltshire division. The club teams play their home games at Trowbridge Cricket Club Ground which is also the main home ground of the Wiltshire County Cricket Club.

== Home ground ==
The county ground has two full-size cricket pitches, a historic pavilion, two scorers' huts and artificial pitches surrounded by cricket nets. The 1st and 2nd Elevens play on the main pitch in front of the pavilion, while the A and B Elevens play on the adjacent Hospital Field, but using changing rooms in the pavilion. Youth matches are played on both pitches. In the 21st century the historic pavilion has been thoroughly renovated, and the changing rooms and other amenities have been upgraded.

== Senior leagues ==
In 2005 Trowbridge CC 1st XI gained promotion to the WEPL Premier 2 by winning the WEPL Gloucestershire & Wiltshire division. The team remained at this level until it was relegated at the end of the 2009 season. Since this relegation, it has remained in the middle of the WEPL Gloucestershire & Wiltshire division and has been unable to get back into the premier leagues. The 1st XI was relegated again at the end of the 2012 season, even though it came 8th in the league. It was relegated due to the restructuring of the league, with two other teams in the league above being relegated into the WEPL Gloucestershire & Wiltshire division. The Trowbridge 1st XI now plays in the WEPL Wiltshire division. The 2nd XI plays in the WEPL Gloucestershire & Wiltshire 2nd XI Division. The A XI plays in the Wiltshire County Cricket League, division 5. There was a B XI side which played in the Wiltshire leagues, but it folded midway through the 2014 season.

== Notable players ==
The Trowbridge club has had overseas players in its 1st and 2nd XIs. These have included players who have played first class cricket and list A cricket in their home countries. Johan Fourie of South Africa played for the 2nd XI for one season in 2004. During his time in Trowbridge, he scored 794 runs at an average of 113.4, with a high score of 121. In the same period, he had a bowling average of 15.38, taking 32 wickets.

Between 2006 and 2008 Assad Fudadin played for Trowbridge CC as an all rounder. In his time with the club he played mainly 1st XI cricket but also some 2nd XI cricket. During his three years at Trowbridge he scored 2659 league runs at an average of 85.77 and took 60 wickets at an average of 26.53. Fudadin made his international debut for west Indies against England at Edgbaston Cricket Ground in 2012.

As well as overseas players, county professional cricketers have also played for Trowbridge. David Brown played 1st XI cricket for two seasons, whilst he was playing for Gloucestershire County Cricket Club. Brown had a highest score of 180, which was scored against Westbury, and best bowling figures of 4-47 against Taunton Deane.
