= Kyle Abbott (cricketer) =

South African cricketer

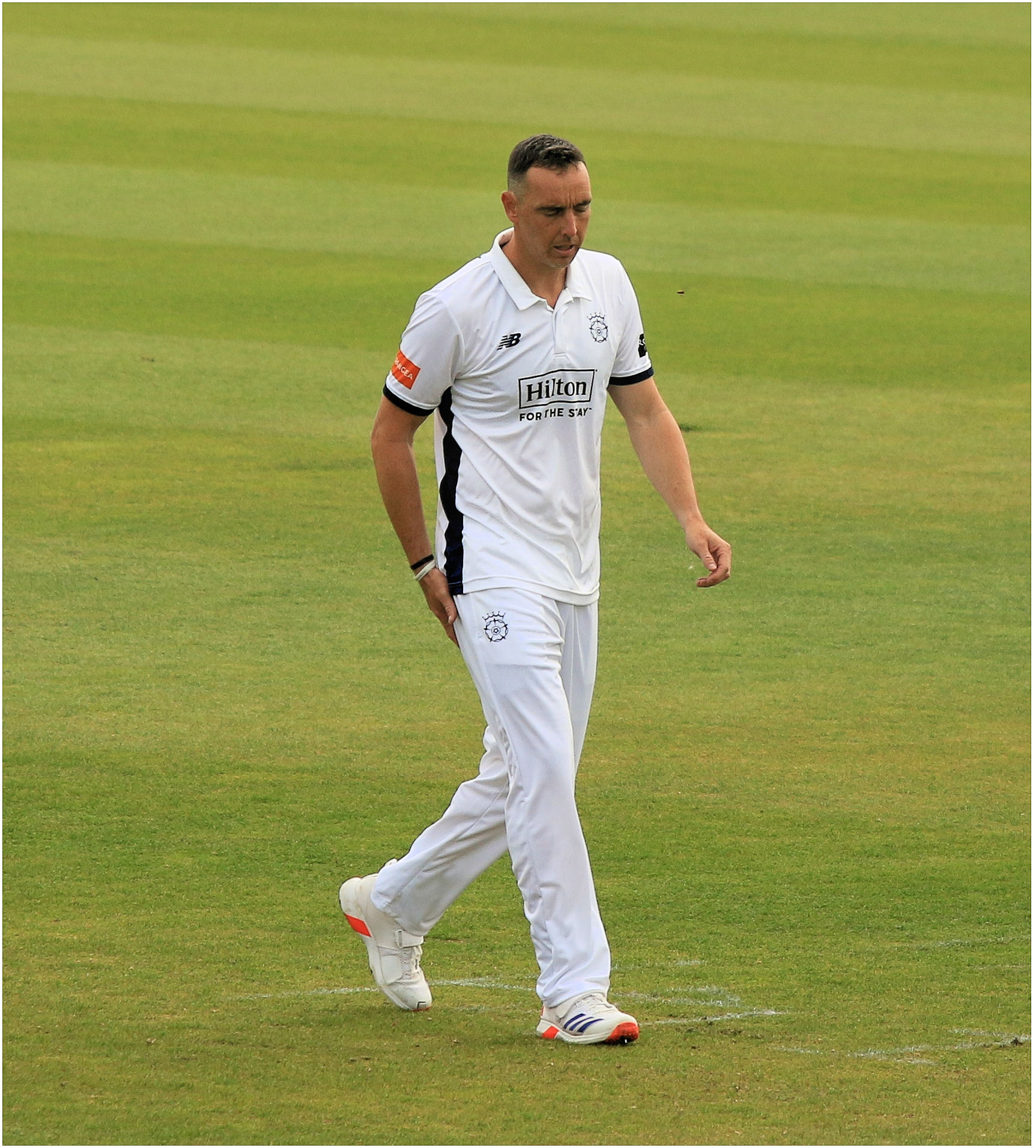
- Abbot in 2025

Personal information
- Full name: Kyle John Abbott
- Born: 18 June 1987 (age 39); Empangeni, Natal Province, South Africa
- Batting: Right-handed
- Bowling: Right-arm fast-medium
- Role: Bowler

International information
- National side: South Africa (2013–2017)
- Test debut (cap 316): 22 February 2013 v Pakistan
- Last Test: 2 January 2017 v Sri Lanka
- ODI debut (cap 109): 10 March 2013 v Pakistan
- Last ODI: 12 October 2016 v Australia
- ODI shirt no.: 87
- T20I debut (cap 57): 3 March 2013 v Pakistan
- Last T20I: 28 March 2016 v Sri Lanka
- T20I shirt no.: 87

Domestic team information
- Years: Team
- 2008/09–2009/10: KwaZulu-Natal
- 2008/09–2015/16: Dolphins
- 2014: Hampshire
- 2015: Middlesex
- 2015/16: KwaZulu-Natal Inland
- 2016: Kings XI Punjab
- 2016: Worcestershire
- 2016/17: Warriors
- 2017–present: Hampshire (squad no. 87)
- 2017: Khulna Titans
- 2018: Lahore Qalandars
- 2018: Boost Defenders
- 2018–2019: Durban Heat (squad no. 25)
- 2018/19: Northern Districts
- 2020: Jaffna Stallions
- 2020/21: Titans
- 2021/22: Boland

Career statistics
Competition	Test	ODI	FC	LA
Matches	11	28	196	134
Runs scored	95	76	3,769	724
Batting average	6.78	8.44	17.28	18.10
100s/50s	0/0	0/0	0/13	0/1
Top score	17	23	97*	56
Balls bowled	2,081	1,303	34,149	6,232
Wickets	39	34	772	178
Bowling average	22.71	30.91	20.61	29.64
5 wickets in innings	3	0	48	1
10 wickets in match	0	0	7	0
Best bowling	7/29	4/21	9/40	5/43
Catches/stumpings	4/–	7/–	34/–	34/–
- Source: ESPNcricinfo, 26 September 2026

Kyle John Abbott (born 18 June 1987) is a South African cricketer. He is a right-arm fast-medium bowler who represented South Africa in Test, One Day International and Twenty20 International cricket between 2013 and 2017, before retiring to take up a contract with Hampshire in English county cricket. He previously played in South African domestic cricket for the Dolphins.

In September 2019, Abbott took match figures of 17–86 in Hampshire's match against Somerset in the 2019 County Championship. These were the fourth-best figures in County Championship cricket in England, and the tenth-best figures of all time in first-class cricket. They were also the best match figures in first-class cricket since Jim Laker took 19–90 in the fourth Test against Australia in 1956.

== Domestic career ==
In 2006 and 2007 Abbott played his cricket for an English seaside town Clevedon Cricket Club which played in the West of England Premier League – Bristol Somerset. This was where he was recognized by Somerset County Cricket Club and represented their second team.

In 2015 Abbott was bought by the Chennai Super Kings in the IPL8 auction. He was included in the KZN Inland squad for the 2015 Africa T20 Cup. In 2016, Abbott was bought by the Kings XI Punjab in the IPL 9 auction.

In October 2018, he was named in Durban Heat's squad for the first edition of the Mzansi Super League T20 tournament. He was the leading wicket-taker for the team in the tournament, with ten dismissals in ten matches.

In January 2019, he was signed by the Northern Knights to play in the 2018–19 Super Smash in New Zealand. In September 2019, he was named in the squad for the Durban Heat team for the 2019 Mzansi Super League tournament. In April 2021, he was named in Boland's squad, ahead of the 2021–22 cricket season in South Africa.

== International career ==
He was named as the replacement for the injured Jacques Kallis in the South Africa national cricket team for the third Test against Pakistan in February 2013. He took seven wickets on debut in the 3rd Test against Pakistan in February 2013, where he was adjudged man of the match as well. These were the ninth best figures of all time for a debutant in test cricket.

On 5 January 2017 following the conclusion of the second Test against Sri Lanka, Abbott signed a Kolpak deal with Hampshire County Cricket Club which made him ineligible to represent South Africa anymore, ending his international career.

== See also ==
- List of South Africa cricketers who have taken five-wicket hauls on Test debut
