= Bill Hyman =

English cricketer

Personal information
- Full name: William Hyman
- Born: 7 March 1875; Radstock, Somerset, England
- Died: 11 February 1959 (aged 83); St Austell, Cornwall, England
- Batting: Right-handed
- Role: Batsman

Domestic team information
- Years: Team
- 1900–1914: Somerset
- First-class debut: 28 June 1900 Somerset v Yorkshire
- Last First-class: 1 September 1914 Somerset v Essex

Career statistics
Competition	First-class
Matches	38
Runs scored	1,000
Batting average	15.62
100s/50s	1/1
Top score	110
Catches/stumpings	10/–
- Source: CricketArchive, 4 July 2010

William Hyman (7 March 1875 – 11 February 1959) played first-class cricket for Somerset from 1900 to 1914. He was born at Radstock, Somerset and died at Mount Charles, St Austell, Cornwall.

== Cricket career ==
Hyman was a right-handed middle order batsman who was renowned in club cricket as a hitter. He played for the first few years of his first-class cricket career as an occasional amateur player, but in the final years, from 1912 to 1914, he turned professional and played for Somerset much more frequently.

Hyman made his debut for Somerset in the same 1900 match against Yorkshire at Dewsbury that saw the debut of A. E. Bailey, but after that every other match of the small number that he played for the county up to August 1912 was held at Bath, where he also played his club cricket. In none of these first-class matches did Hyman make much impact: until 1912, his highest score was less than 20.

His renown rested much more firmly on his club cricket career and on one particular match between Bath and Thornbury Cricket Club at the Thornbury ground in 1902. In that match, Hyman made an unbeaten 359 out of a Bath total of 466 for six wickets, with 32 sixes off the lob bowling of E. M. Grace, the elder brother of W. G. Grace and himself a Test player (though by now 60 years of age). He hit 62 runs from two consecutive overs of bowling from Grace. Other Thornbury bowlers that day included Gloucestershire first-class players Edward Spry and Arthur Paish. "Some say that it took him 110 minutes, others that it was a good deal less," says the account in Somerset's history.

Hyman was not able to reproduce this form in first-class cricket but from August 1912 and through the next two first-class seasons, he played pretty regularly as a professional batsman for Somerset, though the move had limited success. In 1913, he played an innings of 110 in the match against Sussex at Bath, and shared in a second-wicket partnership of 159 with Peter Randall Johnson. But this was his only score above 50 in the season and his batting average was just 17.

The following season, 1914, was no more successful and Hyman had only one good match, a game against Hampshire in August 1914 in which he scored 60 and 34, the first of these innings being his only score of 50 or more in the season. When cricket was suspended for the First World War at the end of the 1914 season, Hyman's cricket career came to an end.

== Outside cricket ==
Hyman was also a football player and appeared alongside three of his brothers for the local Radstock Town F.C. team, as well as playing for Bath City F.C. and the Somerset county football side.

His cousin Ernest Hyman was a footballer who died from injuries sustained while playing for Yeovil Town.
