= Bath Cricket Club Ground =

Cricket ground in Bath, Somerset

Coordinates: 51.38035°N 2.35357°W

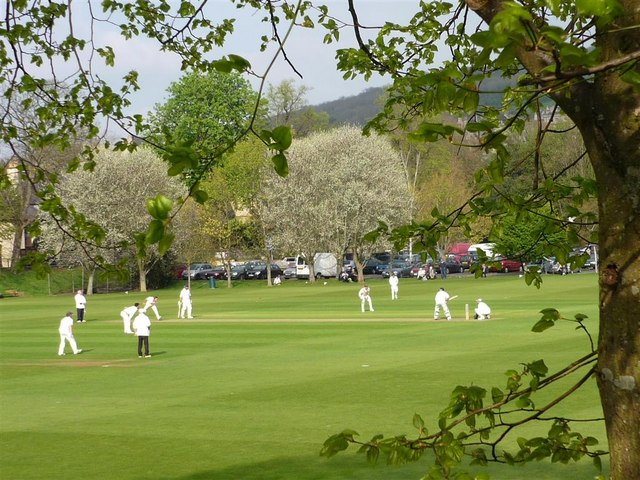

Ground information
- Location: Bath, Somerset
- Establishment: 1944 (first recorded match)

International information
- Only WODI: 30 August 2008: England v India
- First WT20I: 12 August 2007: England v New Zealand
- Last WT20I: 13 August 2007: England v New Zealand
- As of 5 September 2020; Source: Ground profile

Bath Cricket Club Ground is a cricket ground in Bath, Somerset. The first recorded match on the ground was in 1944, when Bath played London Counties. In 1960 and 1963, the ground held Somerset Second XI matches in the Minor Counties Championship.

In 2007, the ground held two Women's Twenty20 Internationals matches, both between England women and New Zealand women. The ground held its first, and to date, only Women's One Day International in 2008 between England women and India women.

In local domestic cricket, the ground is the home venue of Bath Cricket Club which plays in the West of England Premier League.
