= Gloucester City Winget Cricket Club =

Gloucester City Winget Cricket Club is an amateur cricket team based in Gloucester, England. The club was formed in 2005 after the merger of Gloucester's two premier cricket clubs at the time, Gloucester City Cricket Club and Winget Cricket Club. In 2019 the club changed its name to Gloucester Cricket Club.

The club currently plays in the West of England Premier League and home matches are played at the Spa Ground, Gloucester.

The club's 3rd and 4th XIs play their home fixtures at the Wagon Works Ground, Gloucester. Another ground with a history of hosting first class matches.
