= Ernest Hyman =

English footballer (1904–1927)

Ernest Joseph Hyman (1904 – 7 January 1927) was an English footballer for Yeovil Town. He died on 7 January 1927 from injuries sustained during a game for the club against Taunton Town on Boxing Day 1926. He is buried in the graveyard of St Nicholas church, Radstock.

His father was a miner in the Somerset Coalfield, and Ernest was the cousin of cricketer and footballer Bill Hyman and three members of his local Radstock Town F.C. team.
