= Trowbridge Cricket Club Ground =

Cricket ground in England

Coordinates: 51°19′36″N 2°12′26″W

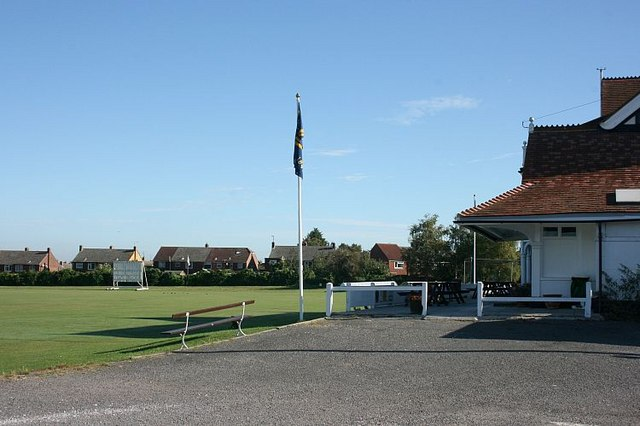
- Interactive map of Trowbridge Cricket Club Ground

Ground information
- Location: Trowbridge, Wiltshire
- Country: England
- Establishment: 1856 (first recorded match)
- End names
- Palmer Road End; Hospital End

Team information
Wiltshire	(1895-present)
Gloucestershire	(1989)
Minor Counties	(1990-1991)
- As of 10 August 2010; Source: Ground profile

Trowbridge Cricket Club Ground is a cricket ground in Trowbridge, Wiltshire. The ground is the main home ground of Wiltshire County Cricket Club. The ground is made up of 2 full size cricket pitches, 2 huts used for scoring, artificial pitches with cricket nets, a car park and a pavilion.

The first recorded match on the ground was in 1856, when Trowbridge played an All England Eleven. The ground hosted its first Minor Counties Championship match when Wiltshire played Bedfordshire in 1895. From 1895 to present, the ground has hosted 121 Minor Counties Championship matches and 10 MCCA Knockout Trophy matches.

The ground has hosted a single first-class match, which came in 1990 when a combined Minor Counties side played the touring Indians. The Indian team contained the likes of Anil Kumble and Sachin Tendulkar.

The ground has also hosted List-A matches. The first List-A match played on the ground was between Wiltshire and Yorkshire in the 1987 NatWest Trophy. The ground has hosted 2 further List-A matches involving Wiltshire, against Surrey in the 1990 NatWest Trophy and Durham in the 1993 NatWest Trophy. Gloucestershire used the ground for a single List-A match against Hampshire in 1989. In 1991, a combined Minor Counties team used the ground for 2 matches in the 1991 Benson & Hedges Cup.

In local domestic cricket, the ground is the home of Trowbridge Cricket Club whose 1st XI play in the West of England Premier League Wiltshire division. The ground has undergone a raft of improvements over the last 10 years leading to much improved changing facilities and improvements to bar areas and stages.
