= Indian cricket team in England in 1986 =

International cricket tour

	India	England
- Dates: 24 May – 8 July 1986
Captains	Kapil Dev	David Gower (ODIs, 1st Test); Mike Gatting (2nd, 3rd Tests)

Test series
- Result: India won the 3-match series 2–0
Most runs	Dilip Vengsarkar (360)	Mike Gatting (293)
Most wickets	Chetan Sharma (16)	Derek Pringle (13)
- Player of the series: Mike Gatting (Eng) and Dilip Vengsarkar (Ind)

One Day International series
- Results: 2-match series drawn 1–1
Most runs	Mohammad Azharuddin (90)	David Gower (81)
Most wickets	Roger Binny (4)	Graham Dilley (2)
- Player of the series: David Gower (Eng) and Ravi Shastri (Ind)

The Indian cricket team toured England from 24 May to 8 July 1986 for a three-match Test series, and two One Day Internationals (ODIs) for the Texaco Trophy.

India beat England 2–0 in the Test series and won the ODI Texaco Trophy that by virtue of faster run-rate despite England having squared the series after losing the first game. India's Dilip Vengsarkar scored a total of 360 runs in the Test series and was named player of the series alongside England's Mike Gatting. In the ODI series, England's David Gower emerged as the top scorer with 81 runs and was named player of the series alongside India's Ravi Shastri.

Also as part of the England tour, India played eight other first-class and seven limited overs games.

== Tour matches ==
=== Limited overs match: Lavinia, Duchess of Norfolk's XI vs Indians ===
4 May
Scorecard

Indians; 217/9 (50 overs)	v	Lavinia, Duchess of Norfolk's XI; 181/5 (39 overs)
Chetan Sharma 49*; Graham Monkhouse 3/57 (10 overs)		Trevor Jesty 74; Maninder Singh 2/21 (6 overs)

Lavinia, Duchess of Norfolk's XI won by 5 wickets
Arundel Castle Cricket Ground, Arundel
Umpires: Derek Dennis (Eng) and John Langridge (Eng)

- Lavinia, Duchess of Norfolk's XI won the toss and decided to field.
- Lavinia, Duchess of Norfolk's XI's target was 178 runs in 41 overs.

=== Three-day match: Worcestershire vs Indians ===
6–8 May
Scorecard

Worcestershire	v	Indians
230/9d (88 overs); Graeme Hick 70; Chetan Sharma 3/70 (19 overs)		297 (74.2 overs); Mohammad Azharuddin 76; Ricardo Ellcock 3/77 (17 overs)
56/0 (19 overs); Damian D'Oliveira 27*; Maninder Singh 0/5 (5 overs)

Match drawn
New Road, Worcester
Umpires: Jack Birkenshaw (Eng) and David Shepherd (Eng)

- Indians won the toss and decided to field.

=== Three-day match: Gloucestershire vs Indians ===
10–12 May
Scorecard

Indians	v	Gloucestershire
322/5d (94 overs); Ravi Shastri 70*; David Lawrence 2/59 (16 overs)		271/5d (87 overs); Kevin Curran 69*; Shivlal Yadav 2/62 (20 overs)
135/3d (72 overs); Mohinder Amarnath 43*; Bill Athey 1/14 (11 overs)

Match drawn
The Victoria Ground, Cheltenham
Umpires: Dickie Bird (Eng) and Alan Whitehead (Eng)

- Gloucestershire won the toss and decided to field.

=== Limited overs match: Surrey vs Indians ===
15 May
Scorecard

Surrey; 230/8 (50 overs)	v	Indians; 231/5 (47.3 overs)
Alan Butcher 140 (158); Chetan Sharma 3/30 (10 overs)		Sunil Gavaskar 81; Mark Feltham 2/62 (9.3 overs)

Indians won by 5 wickets
Kennington Oval, Kennington
Umpires: John Jameson (Eng) and Bob White (Eng)

- Indians won the toss and decided to field.

== Test Series ==
=== First Test ===
5–10 June
Scorecard

England	v	India
294 (128.2 overs); Graham Gooch 114 (280); Chetan Sharma 5/64 (32 overs)		341 (137 overs); Dilip Vengsarkar 126* (213); Graham Dilley 4/146 (34 overs)
180 (96.4 overs); Mike Gatting 40 (83); Kapil Dev 4/52 (22 overs)		136/5 (42 overs); Dilip Vengsarkar 33 (56); Graham Dilley 2/28 (10 overs)

India won by 5 wickets
Lord's Cricket Ground, London
Attendance: 57,509
Umpires: Ken Palmer (Eng) and David Shepherd (Eng)
Player of the match: Kapil Dev (Ind)

- India won the toss and decided to field.
- Kiran More (Ind) made his Test debut.
- It was India's first win in 21 Tests with Kapil Dev as captain.

=== Second Test ===
19–23 June
Scorecard

India	v	England
272 (104.2 overs); Dilip Vengsarkar 61 (153); Derek Pringle 3/47 (27 overs)		102 (45.1 overs); Bill Athey 32 (72); Roger Binny 5/40 (13 overs)
237 (76.3 overs); Dilip Vengsarkar 102* (216); John Lever 4/64 (23 overs)		128 (63.3 overs); Mike Gatting 31* (124); Maninder Singh 4/26 (16.3 overs)

India won by 279 runs
Headingley, Leeds
Umpires: Jack Birkenshaw (Eng) and David Constant (Eng)
Player of the match: Dilip Vengsarkar (Ind)

- India won the toss and decided to bat
- Bruce French (Eng) and Chandrakant Pandit (Ind) made their Test debuts.

=== Third Test ===
3–8 July
Scorecard

England	v	India
390 (116.3 overs); Mike Gatting 183* (294); Chetan Sharma 4/130 (29.3 overs)		390 (139.5 overs); Mohinder Amarnath 79 (237); Neil Foster 3/93 (41 overs)
235 (94 overs); Graham Gooch 40 (43); Chetan Sharma 6/58 (24 overs)		174/5 (78 overs); Sunil Gavaskar 54 (135); Phil Edmonds 4/31 (28 overs)

Match drawn
Edgbaston, Birmingham
Umpires: Dickie Bird (Eng) and Barrie Meyer (Eng)
Player of the match: Mike Gatting (Eng)

- England won the toss and decided to bat
- Mark Benson and Neal Radford (Eng) made their Test debuts.

== Texaco Trophy ==
The 1986 edition of the Texaco Trophy was a One Day International (ODI) cricket tournament held between England and India in England. India won the first game and England won the second, leveling the series at 1–1. India won the trophy by virtue of a faster run-rate in the two matches.

=== First match ===
24 May
Scorecard

England; 162 (55 overs)	v	India; 163/1 (47.2 overs)
Derek Pringle 28 (66); Chetan Sharma 3/25 (11 overs)		Mohammad Azharuddin 83 (154); Graham Dilley 1/53 (11 overs)

India won by 9 wickets
The Oval, Kennington
Attendance: 14,811
Umpires: David Shepherd (Eng) and Alan Whitehead (Eng)
Player of the match: Mohammad Azharuddin (Ind)

- India won the toss and decided to field.

=== Second match ===
26 May
Scorecard

India; 254/6 (55 overs)	v	England; 256/5 (53.5 overs)
Krishnamachari Srikkanth 67 (93); Graham Dilley 2/46 (11 overs)		David Gower 81 (94); Roger Binny 2/47 (10 overs)

England won by 5 wickets
Old Trafford, Manchester
Attendance: 16,202
Umpires: Dickie Bird (Eng) and David Constant (Eng)
Player of the match: David Gower (Eng)

- England won the toss and decided to field.

== External sources ==
CricketArchive

== Annual reviews ==
- Playfair Cricket Annual 1987
- Wisden Cricketers' Almanack 1987
