= Cheltenham Cricket Club =

English amateur cricket club based in Cheltenham, Gloucestershire

Cheltenham Cricket Club is an English amateur cricket club based in Cheltenham, Gloucestershire first envisioned in 1891. It played its first game on 21 June 1897 against a picked XI of WG Grace. The club's first team plays in the West of England Premier League which is an accredited ECB Premier League, the highest level for recreational club cricket in England and Wales. It has also been a Ladies Hockey Club in 1899, tennis club in 1912 and training area for the armed forces during World War I. It hosted County Championship cricket matches, from 1923 until 1937, and junior cricket since 1921.

Cheltenham have won the ECB National Club Cricket Championship twice, in 1970 and 1978, and been the premier league champions on one occasion, in 2004. Prior to the formation of the WEPL, Cheltenham competed in the Western League, winning that league three times in four seasons between 1989 and 1992. The club have also won the Gloucestershire County Knock-out Cup on two occasions.

During the 1920s and 1930s, Cheltenham's Victoria Ground was a regular venue for first-class matches involving Gloucestershire, but since that time it has only hosted a single first-class fixture, when Gloucestershire played the Indian tourists in 1986. The ground has also hosted a NatWest Trophy match and two ICC Trophy matches.
