= Wiltshire County Cricket League =

The Wiltshire County Cricket League (WCCL) is the feeder cricket league for the Wiltshire section of the West of England Premier League (WEPL). As of 2020, the league has nine divisions of ten teams, who play 45-over matches on Saturdays. The winner of Division One is promoted into the WEPL.

The league was formed in the early 1980s and covers most of Wiltshire and Swindon (except for the Salisbury area, where teams play in Hampshire leagues), as well as including clubs which are just over the border into Somerset, Gloucestershire and Oxfordshire. Clubs may field more than one team.

Beginning with the 2020 season, the league is sponsored by Neon Cricket, a Trowbridge-based supplier of cricket equipment.

The league is a member of Wiltshire Cricket Limited, the governing body for cricket in the county.

== Division 1 winners ==
Year	
2018	Potterne 2nds
2017	Bear Flat
2016	Wootton Bassett
2015	Urchfont
2014	Malmesbury
2013	Purton
2012	Calne
2011	Burbage & ER
2010	Spye Park
2009	Devizes
2008	Calne
2007	Potterne
2006	Great Bedwyn
