= Bristol & District Cricket Association =

English cricket association

The Bristol & District Cricket Association (BDCA or B&D) is an English cricket association that organises league and cup competitions in the Bristol area. The association covers Bristol, as well as parts of South Gloucestershire and North Somerset.

The league competition serves as a feeder league to the West of England Premier League (WEPL) as part of the pyramid structure of club cricket, with the winners of the B&D Senior Division gaining promotion to the Bristol & North Somerset Division of the WEPL.

== Winners ==
Year	Senior Division Champions	Cup Winners
2019	Westbury Cricket Club, Old Bristolians Westbury Cricket Club	
2018	Frenchay Cricket Club	Almondsbury Cricket Club
2017	Congresbury Cricket Club	Clevedon Cricket Club
2016	Pak Bristolians Cricket Club	Lansdown Cricket Club
2015	Pak Bristolians Cricket Club	Winterbourne Cricket Club
2014	Portishead Cricket Club	Bedminster Cricket Club
2013	Bristol Y.M.C.A. Cricket Club	Knowle Cricket Club
2012	Chew Magna Cricket Club	Brislington Cricket Club
2011	Timsbury Cricket Club	Bristol Cricket Club
2010	Bristol Asians Cricket Club	Bedminster Cricket Club
2009	Twyford House Cricket Club	Knowle Cricket Club
2008	Bishopston Cricket Club	Bedminster Cricket Club
2007	Chipping Sodbury Cricket Club	Knowle Cricket Club
2006	Bedminster Cricket Club	Timsbury Cricket Club
2005	Almondsbury Cricket Club	
2004	Twyford House Cricket Club	
2003	Pak Bristolians Cricket Club	
