= Lyncombe =

Lyncombe may refer to:

- A hamlet near Exford, Somerset
- The former settlement and parish, and now district of Lyncombe, Bath
