= Clevedon Cricket Club =

English amateur cricket club

- League: West of England Premier League - Premier One

Personnel
- Captain: Matt Carpenter
- Chairman: Marc Jenkins

Team information
- Colors: Blue Yellow
- Founded: 1874
- Home ground: Dial Hill, Clevedon

History
- No. of titles: 2
- West of England Premier League wins: 2018, 2021
- Bristol & District Cricket Association Cup wins: 2017
- Official website: www.clevedoncricketclub.co.uk
League
U19s
First team

Clevedon Cricket Club is an English amateur cricket club based in Clevedon, North Somerset. The club was established in 1874 and is one of the leading clubs around the Bristol and Somerset area. The club is located at the top of one of the seven hills in Clevedon and overlooks the Mendips and Bristol Channel from its ground at Dial Hill.

Clevedon CC have 4 men's Saturday teams with the 1st XI competing in the West of England Premier League, which is an accredited ECB Premier League, the highest level for recreational club cricket in England and Wales.

In 2012, Clevedon CC finished second in the Bristol & Somerset division before being promoted as champions in 2013. The following season, in 2014, Clevedon CC achieved a second promotion in as many years when they finished runners-up to Ilminster CC by 1 point. Since the 2015 season Clevedon CC have been playing in the Premier One division of the West of England Premier League.

== Notable current and former players ==
Name	Professional team(s)
Andy Caddick	Somerset & England
Geraint Jones	Kent & England
Huw Jenkins	Glamorgan
Kyle Abbott	Dolphins, KwaZulu-Natal, Hampshire & South Africa
Mark Douglas	Central District, Wellington & New Zealand
Mark Greatbatch	Auckland, Central District & New Zealand
Paul Unwin	Central District, Canterbury & Somerset
Peter McGlashan	Central District & Northern District
Peter Trego	Somerset & England U19
Robert Cunliffe	Gloucestershire & Leicestershire
Tim Hancock	Gloucestershire
Sean Dickson	Northerns & Kent
Josh Davey	Middlesex, Somerset & Scotland
Chris Jones	Somerset
Jake Lintott	Hampshire, Gloucestershire & Warwickshire
Dom Bess	Somerset & England
Ryan Higgins	Middlesex & Gloucestershire
Graeme van Buuren	Northerns, Titans & Gloucestershire
