= Bear Flat =

Area of Bath, England

Coordinates: 51.3738°N 2.3666°W

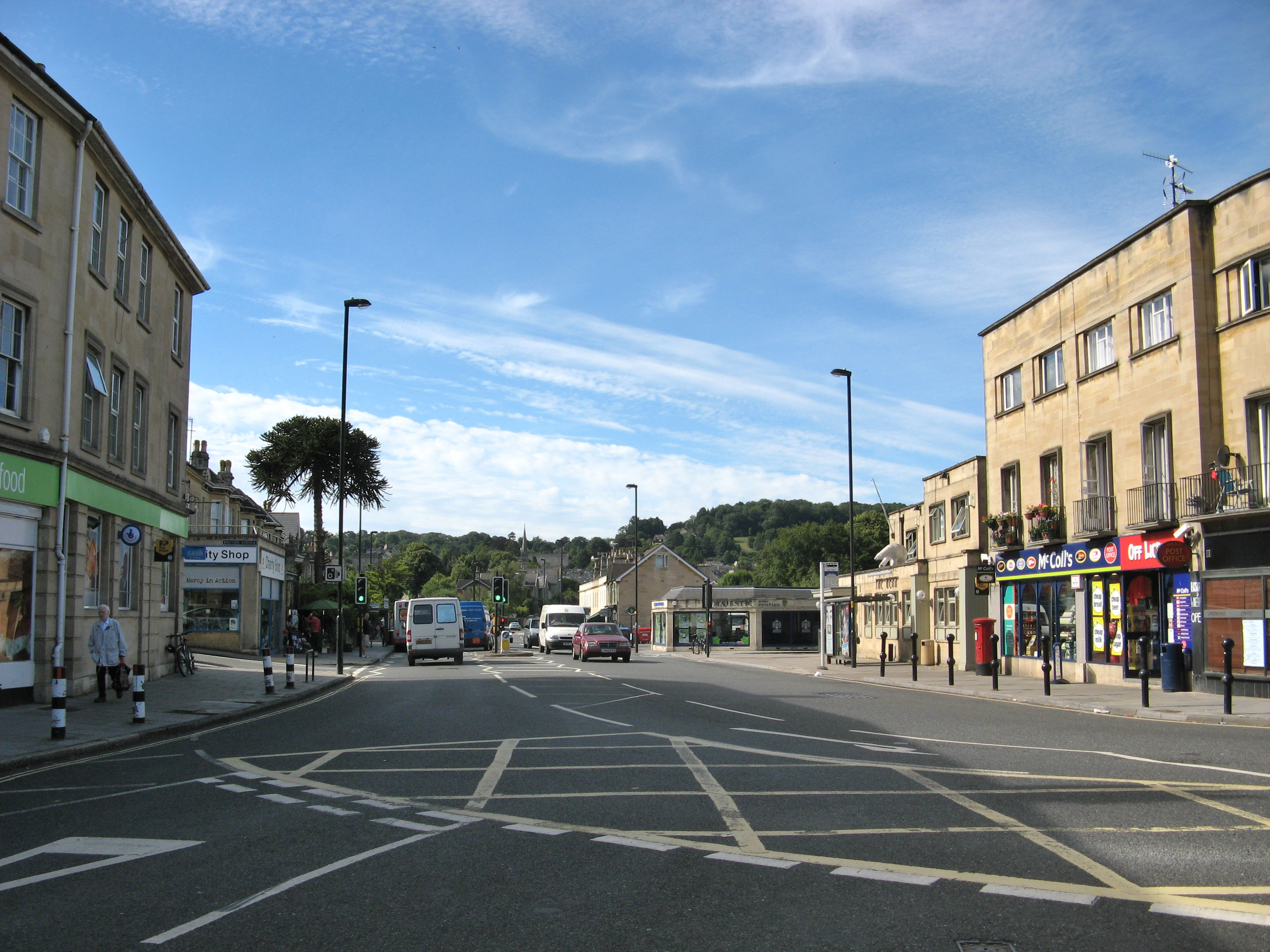

- Location within Somerset
- OS grid reference: ST745638
- Unitary authority: Bath and North East Somerset
- Ceremonial county: Somerset
- Region: South West
- Country: England
- Sovereign state: United Kingdom
- Post town: BATH
- Postcode district: BA2
- Dialling code: 01225
- Police: Avon and Somerset
- Fire: Avon
- Ambulance: South Western
- UK Parliament: Bath

Bear Flat is a neighbourhood within the city of Bath, in the Bath and North East Somerset district, in Somerset, England, to the south of the city centre and to the west of Beechen Cliff (a heavily wooded escarpment on the northern side of Lyncombe Hill, which features in Jane Austen's Northanger Abbey). It forms the southern part of the Widcombe and Lyncombe electoral ward. The Wellsway road (A367) to Shepton Mallet, runs through Bear Flat, forming part of the ancient British Roman Fosse Way. This was originally the main pilgrimage route from Bath and its abbey, to the nearby ecclesiastical centres of Wells and Glastonbury.

Bath is a hilly city and the term 'Flat' may be derived from the way the district is defined by a short plateau at the top of the steep Wells Road and Holloway routes out of the city centre, which forms the local business district. 'Bear' has nothing to do with the animal but is believed to be a contraction of an Anglo-Saxon name 'Berewick' - 'Bere' meaning Barley and 'Wick' being a settlement - a settlement near a barley field. Such a field would have been part of Barrack Farm, which was located in the area but demolished in the 19th century to make way for housing. Physical evidence of the former farm exists at the top of the Wellsway at Odd Down with a pair of houses known as Barrack Farm Cottages.

== Location ==
In reaching Bear Flat from the centre of Bath, the original route was up the steep lane of Holloway (either the 'holy way', or a way hollowed out as it climbs around the shoulder of Lyncombe Hill). Holloway was a possible southern route of the Fosse Way out of Bath and has a 14th-century pilgrims' church, the Magdalen Chapel and well (recently restored but without water). To the north of the chapel is the eighteenth century Magdalen Cottage, a former leper hospital but now a private dwelling. In the nineteenth century, another route out of the city centre to Bear Flat was constructed, an early example of a by-pass with slightly gentler slope. Now called Wells Road, the route was named on some early maps simply as the Wells-Exeter Road. Holloway has been closed to traffic at the northern end since the late 1960s, when the area was extensively and quite controversially redeveloped during a period in the immediate post war decades known as The Sack of Bath. Vehicles now take the Wells Road out of Bath towards Radstock, while pedestrians and cyclists can still follow Holloway up the hill.

At the top of Lyncombe Hill to the east of Bear Flat is Alexandra Park, which affords fine views over the city. This was opened in 1903 and named in honour of Queen Alexandra. Alongside Alexandra Park is Beechen Cliff School. Further to the east runs the Widcombe valley, once a parish outside the city of Bath. It is characterised by its Georgian buildings. To the south is the deep wooded valley of Lyncombe Vale. This was formerly the route of the Bath branch of the Somerset and Dorset Railway, and the Combe Down Tunnel which at 1700 metres in length was reputed to be the longest unventilated rail tunnel in Britain. This tunnel, together with the shorter Devonshire Tunnel, were both reopened as part of the Two Tunnels Greenway on 6 April 2013 forming part of the National Cycle Network NCR244.

== Buildings and Services ==
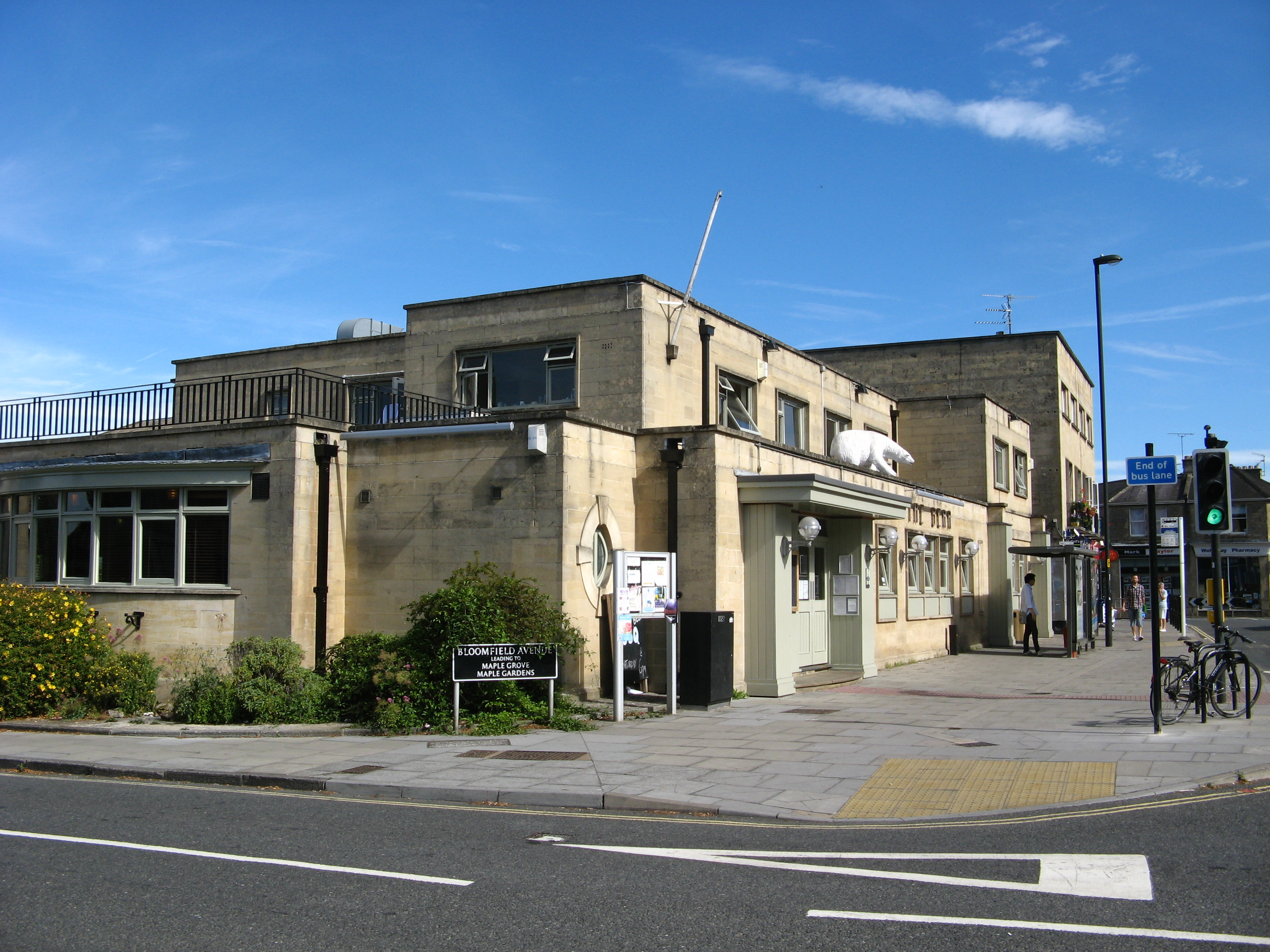
The Bear pub in 2010

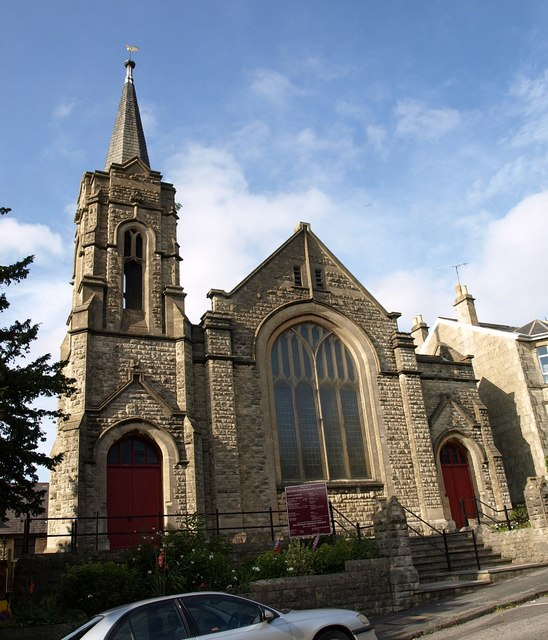
Beechen Cliff Methodist Church

The Georgians built at either end of Bear Flat: at Devonshire Buildings to the south, and Beechen Cliff to the north. The main estate of Poets' Corner is a late Victorian and Edwardian district of large terraced houses and forms a part of the wider City of Bath conservation area. Poets' Corner comprises four avenues (Shakespeare, Milton, Kipling and Longfellow), which all lead directly perpendicular from the Wellsway) with Chaucer Road running through the estate parallel to Wellsway. Other 'Poet' locations include Byron Road and Shelley Road. Other streets include Devonshire Place, Attewell Place (formerly Cross's Yard) and Greenway Court.

The area at the top of the hill where the Wells Road meets Holloway and becomes the Wellsway has been a local commercial centre for some time. Before the Second World War it included various shops including a bank and a chemist. During the Second World War, Bear Flat was targeted in the 'Baedeker' raids on the city of Bath, and damage was done to the area near the junction of the Wellsway and Holloway. Images can be seen at The Bath Blitz Memorial Site. Some of the modern shops are in premises that have been rebuilt since the war.

Bear Flat still has a range of shops, including a small Co-operative supermarket, Andrews estate agents, a branch of Cook, Majestic Wine, Da Vinci's delicatessen, and various other businesses including a chemist, hairdresser, barber, florist and a charity shop. Rolfeys Antique shop closed in 2019

For people who wish to eat in Bear Flat there is a cafe, a fish and chip shop, a Tandoori restaurant, Menu Gordon Jones, whose owner/chef has gained both local and national accolades, Da Vinci also provides coffee and lunch. There are also two public houses; The Bear which comprises a restaurant and now provides accommodation and the more traditional Devonshire Arms, which also serves food, has numerous sporting attractions including a traditional skittle alley and provides venue space. The Bear pub was formerly a brewery and public house but was severely damaged by a bomb in the Second World War and subsequently demolished - the current pub is post-war and features a large polar bear on its front roof which has become the emblem for the Bear Flat Association.

The Beechen Cliff Methodist Church, built in 1905, is located at the bottom of Shakespeare Avenue, with Bruton Community Hall, the home of the monthly Bear Flat Community Market and the Bear Flat Pre-school located at the rear in Bruton Avenue. There are a number of bed and breakfast businesses attracted by the convenient access to the city centre, together with a double glazing showroom and building company on the east side of the Wellsway.

== Bear Flat Artists ==
Each year a large group of local artists and crafts people, including painters, potters/ceramicists, sculptors, jewellers and photographers organise an Open Studios event over the Spring Bank Holiday weekend. Numerous homes are opened to the public during this weekend and The Bear Hotel provides space for the artists to display their work, much of this work is also for sale.

== Bear Flat Association ==
Bear Flat Association (BFA) is the local residents' association, promoting a vibrant community and seeking to protect and improve Bear Flat and its environs. As well as providing a focal point for representing residents’ views and concerns, BFA takes initiatives, such as setting up festive lighting around Bear Flat's local shops for the first time, creating a community garden at a prominent road junction, and renovating a listed Victorian fountain.

BFA has published a vision paper for its high street as a yardstick for local planners, aiming to make Bear Flat less of a highway and more of a village centre.

BFA runs a monthly community market and repair café, an annual outdoor theatre and carol singing at Christmas. Its monthly Bear Flat Flyer covers both BFA's activities and local news and events.

Formed in 2012, BFA is a membership organisation and registered as a Charitable Incorporated Organisation (1194540).
