= Edward Spry =

English cricketer

Personal information
- Full name: Edward James Spry
- Born: 31 July 1881; Bristol, England
- Died: 18 November 1958 (aged 77); Bristol, England
- Batting: Right-handed
- Bowling: Leg break

Domestic team information
- Years: Team
- 1899–1921: Gloucestershire

Career statistics
| Competition | First-class |
|---|---|
| Matches | 89 |
| Runs scored | 1,447 |
| Batting average | 11.13 |
| 100s/50s | –/2 |
| Top score | 76 |
| Balls bowled | 7,137 |
| Wickets | 149 |
| Bowling average | 28.89 |
| 5 wickets in innings | 13 |
| 10 wickets in match | 3 |
| Best bowling | 8/52 |
| Catches/stumpings | 45/– |
- Source: Cricinfo, 20 July 2013

Edward James Spry (31 July 1881 – 18 November 1958) was an English cricketer active from 1889 to 1921. Born in Bristol, Spry was a right-handed batsman and leg break bowler. He made nearly ninety appearances in first-class cricket for Gloucestershire.

== Career ==
Spry played for Westbury for a short time before joining the Imperial Cricket Club. Between 1910 and 1929 he completed 225 innings with an average of over 35 and took 1,329 wickets at a cost of 10.9 runs each. On three occasions he took more than 100 wickets in a season (Saturdays only) – a great feat when one remembers that it was achieved in a little over 20 games per year. He played many times for Gloucestershire and on retirement from active participation in the game continued to serve the game he, loved in a variety of capacities.

Spry first played for Gloucestershire. in 1899, which was the last season in which W. G. Grace captained the county. He played his final four matches in 1909 but returned in 1921 when he was a month shy of forty.

He played twice against London County in 1903 and had the pleasure of getting W. G. out caught and bowled when he had scored 150 at Crystal Palace. However, Spry's taxing performance must have been in that 1902 season at Old Trafford when he took 6 wickets in the first Lancashire innings and 8 in the second, bowling over 66 overs in the match.

He died on 18 November 1958 at his home in Knowle, Bristol, at age 77.
