= Erinoid Ground =

Cricket ground in Stroud, Gloucestershire

Coordinates: 51.73530°N 2.23414°W

Ground information
- Location: Stroud, Gloucestershire

Team information
Gloucestershire	(1956-1963)
- As of 11 September 2010; Source: Ground profile

Erinoid Ground was a cricket ground in Stroud, Gloucestershire. The first recorded important match on the ground was in 1880, when Stroud played a United South of England Eleven.

In 1956, Gloucestershire played Nottinghamshire in the ground's first first-class match. Gloucestershire played 14 first-class matches at the ground from 1956 to 1963, the last of which saw them play Glamorgan in the 1963 County Championship.

In 1970 the Bristol and District Cricket Association played Midlands Club Cricket Conference on the ground. Today, the site of the ground is occupied by the Bath Road Trading Estate. The ground's name came from the adjacent Erinoid plastic factory.
