= The Victoria Ground, Cheltenham =

Cricket ground in Cheltenham, England

Coordinates: 51.89893°N 2.06099°W

The Victoria Ground
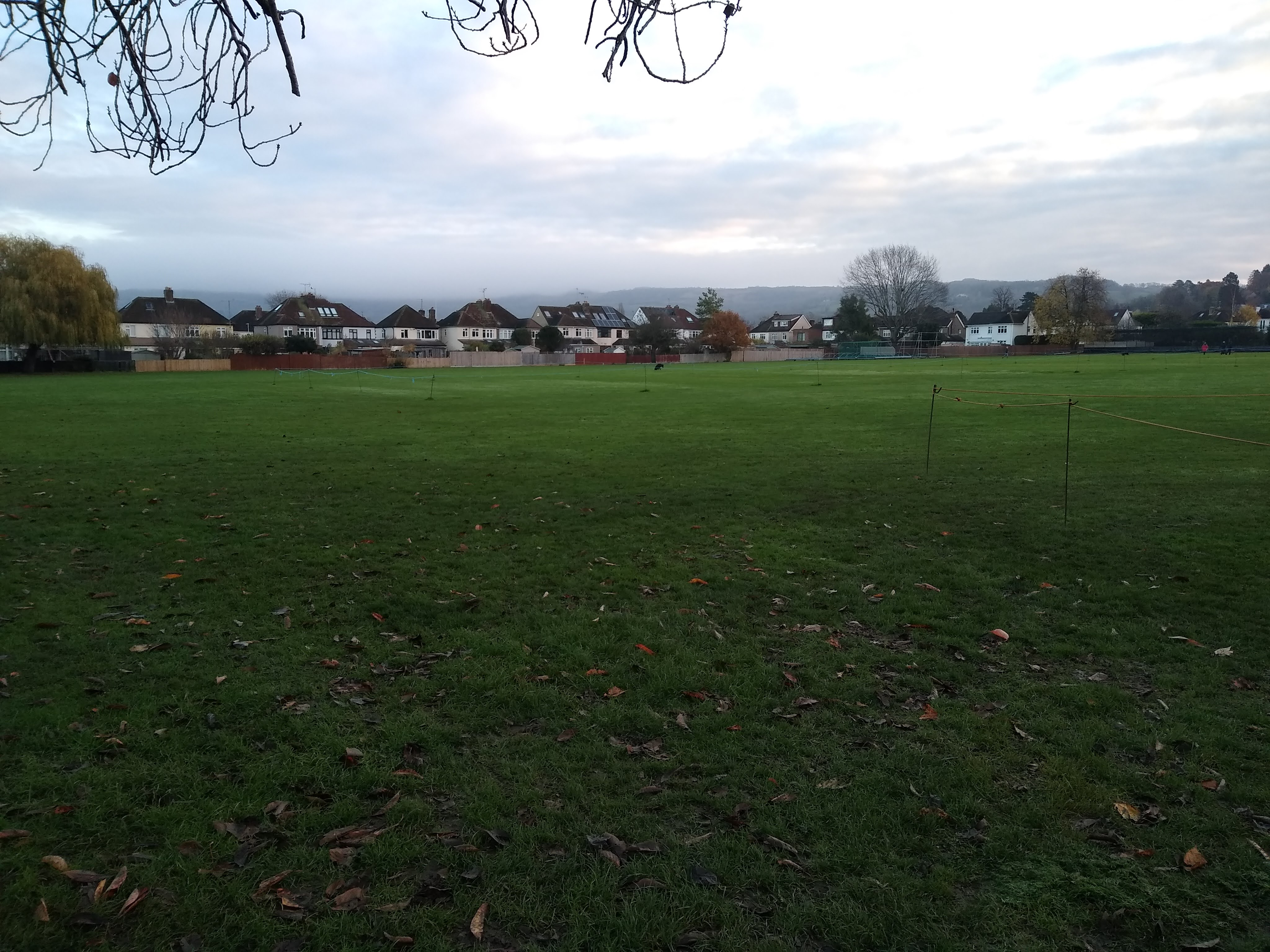
- The Victoria Ground in 2022

Ground information
- Location: Cheltenham, Gloucestershire
- Establishment: 1893 (first recorded match)

Team information
Gloucestershire	(1923–1933, 1937 & 1986)
Gloucestershire Cricket Board	(2000)
- As of 10 September 2010; Source: Ground profile

The Victoria Ground is a cricket ground in Cheltenham, Gloucestershire. The first recorded match on the ground was in 1893, when Cheltenham played East Gloucestershire.

Gloucestershire played their first first-class match there in 1923 against Glamorgan. Gloucestershire played 19 first-class matches at the ground from 1923 to 1937, playing their only game there in 1937 against Kent in the County Championship. In 1986, Gloucestershire returned to the ground where they played a single first-class match against the Indians during their tour of England.

As well as hosting first-class cricket the ground has also hosted a single List-A match between the Gloucestershire Cricket Board and the Nottinghamshire Cricket Board in the 2000 NatWest Trophy.

In 1982, the ground held a single international match between Israel and Papua New Guinea in the 1982 ICC Trophy. During the 1986 ICC Trophy, the ground held a further ICC Trophy match between Canada and the Netherlands.

In local domestic cricket, the ground is the home venue of Cheltenham Cricket Club.
