= East Gloucestershire Cricket Club Ground =

Cricket ground in Cheltenham, Gloucestershire, England

Coordinates: 51.88690°N 2.06722°W

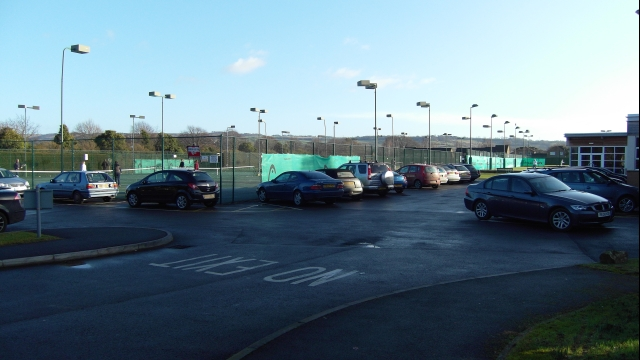
- The site today

Ground information
- Location: Cheltenham, Gloucestershire
- Establishment: 1883 (first recorded match)

Team information
| Gloucestershire | (1888 & 1903) |
- As of 11 September 2010; Source: Ground profile

East Gloucestershire Cricket Club Ground was a cricket ground in Cheltenham, Gloucestershire. The first recorded match on the ground was in 1883, when East Gloucestershire played Worcestershire.

In 1888, Gloucestershire played Nottinghamshire in the grounds first first-class match. The second and final first-class match held on the ground came in 1903 when Gloucestershire played the Gentlemen of Philadelphia.

No longer used for cricket, today the site of the ground is by the East Gloucestershire Tennis Club.
