= Recreational Trust Ground =

Cricket ground in Lydney, England

Coordinates: 51.72399°N 2.52826°W

Ground information
- Location: Lydney, Gloucestershire

Team information
Gloucestershire	(1963-1975)
- As of 11 September 2010; Source: Ground profile

Recreational Trust Ground is a cricket ground in Lydney, Gloucestershire. The first inter-county match on the ground was in 1962, when the Gloucestershire Second XI played the Glamorgan Second XI in the Second XI Championship.

In 1963, Gloucestershire played Surrey in the ground's first first-class match. Gloucestershire played 8 first-class matches at the ground from 1963 to 1968, the last of which saw them play Sussex in the 1968 County Championship.

As well as hosting first-class cricket the ground has also hosted List-A matches. The first List-A match held there came in the 1969 Player's County League when Gloucestershire played Sussex. From 1969 to 1975, Gloucestershire played 8 List-A matches there, the last of which saw them play Glamorgan in the 1975 John Player League.

The ground has also played host to 14 matches involving the Gloucestershire Second XI in the Second XI Championship and Second XI Trophy.

The ground is the home venue of Lydney Cricket Club, which has played at the ground since 1949.
