= Swilgate =

Cricket ground in Tewkesbury, England

Coordinates: 51.99080°N 2.15703°W

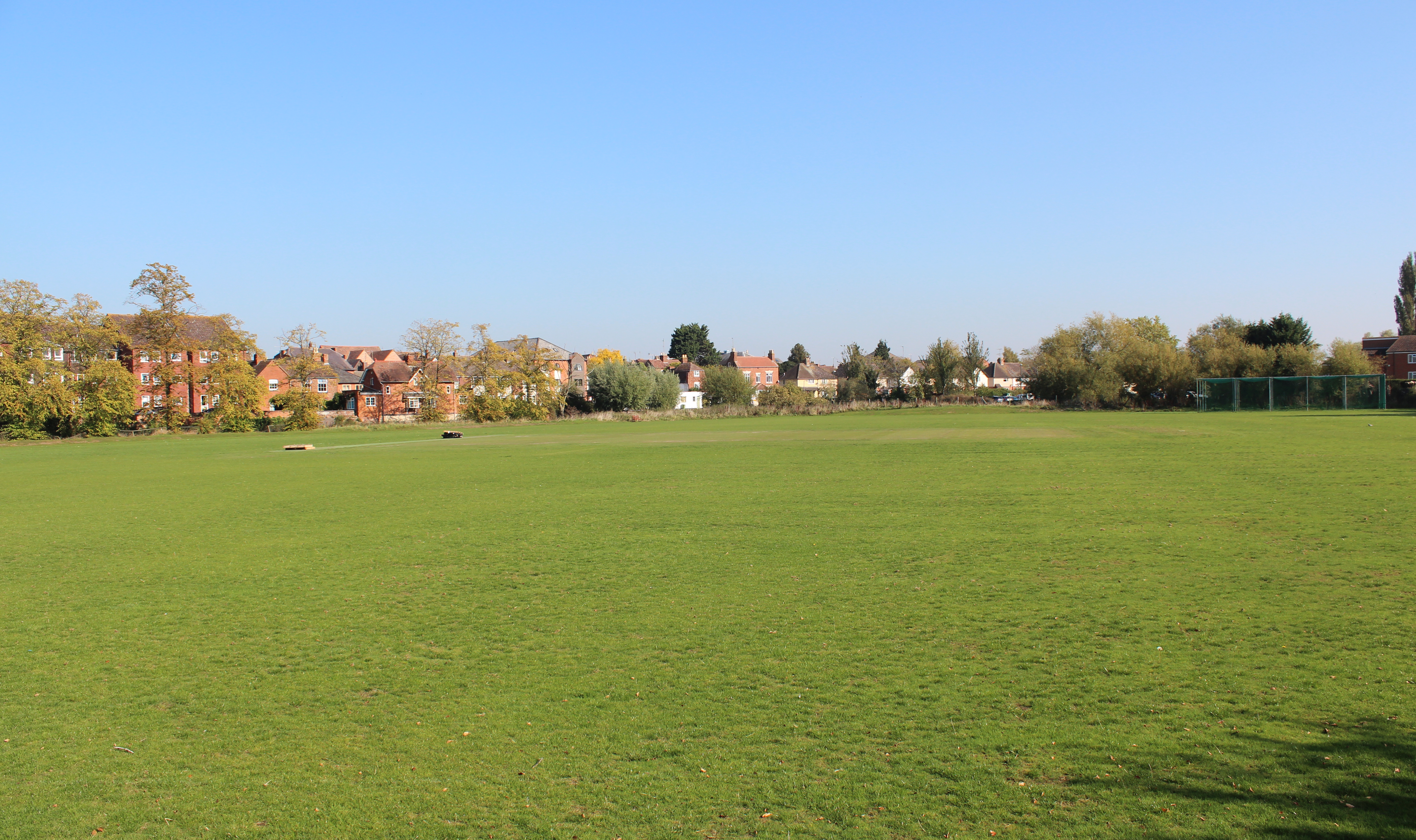

Ground information
- Location: Tewkesbury, Gloucestershire
- Establishment: 1893 (first recorded match)

Team information
| Gloucestershire | (1972-1973) |
- As of 10 September 2010; Source: Ground profile

Swilgate is a cricket ground in Tewkesbury, Gloucestershire. The first recorded match on the ground was in 1893, when Tewkesbury played Handsworth Wood.

Gloucestershire played two List A matches at the ground, the first of which saw them play Yorkshire in the 1972 John Player League. The second and final List-A match at the ground came the following season in the same tournament when Gloucestershire played Lancashire.

Gloucestershire Women used the ground in the 2010 Women's County Championship Division Five South and West against Wiltshire Women. In local domestic cricket, the ground is the home venue of Tewkesbury Cricket Club.
