= Dowty Arle Court =

Cricket ground in England

Coordinates: 51.89096°N 2.12441°W

- Interactive map of Dowty Arle Court

Ground information
- Location: Cheltenham, Gloucestershire
- Country: England

Team information
Gloucestershire	(1992)
- As of 11 September 2010; Source: Ground profile

Dowty Arle Court is a cricket ground in Cheltenham, Gloucestershire. The first important match on the ground was in 1988, when the Gloucestershire Second XI played the Warwickshire Second XI in the Second XI Championship. Between 1988 and 1995, the ground held a combined total of 11 Second XI fixtures for the Gloucestershire Second XI in both the Second XI Championship and the Second XI Trophy.

In 1992, Gloucestershire played 2 List-A matches at the ground. The first of which saw them play Leicestershire and the second of which saw them play a combined Minor Counties team. Both matches came in the 1992 Benson and Hedges Cup.

In local domestic cricket, the ground is the home venue of Dowty Arle Court Cricket Club.
