= Spa Ground =

Cricket ground in Gloucester, England

Coordinates: 51.85873°N 2.24718°W

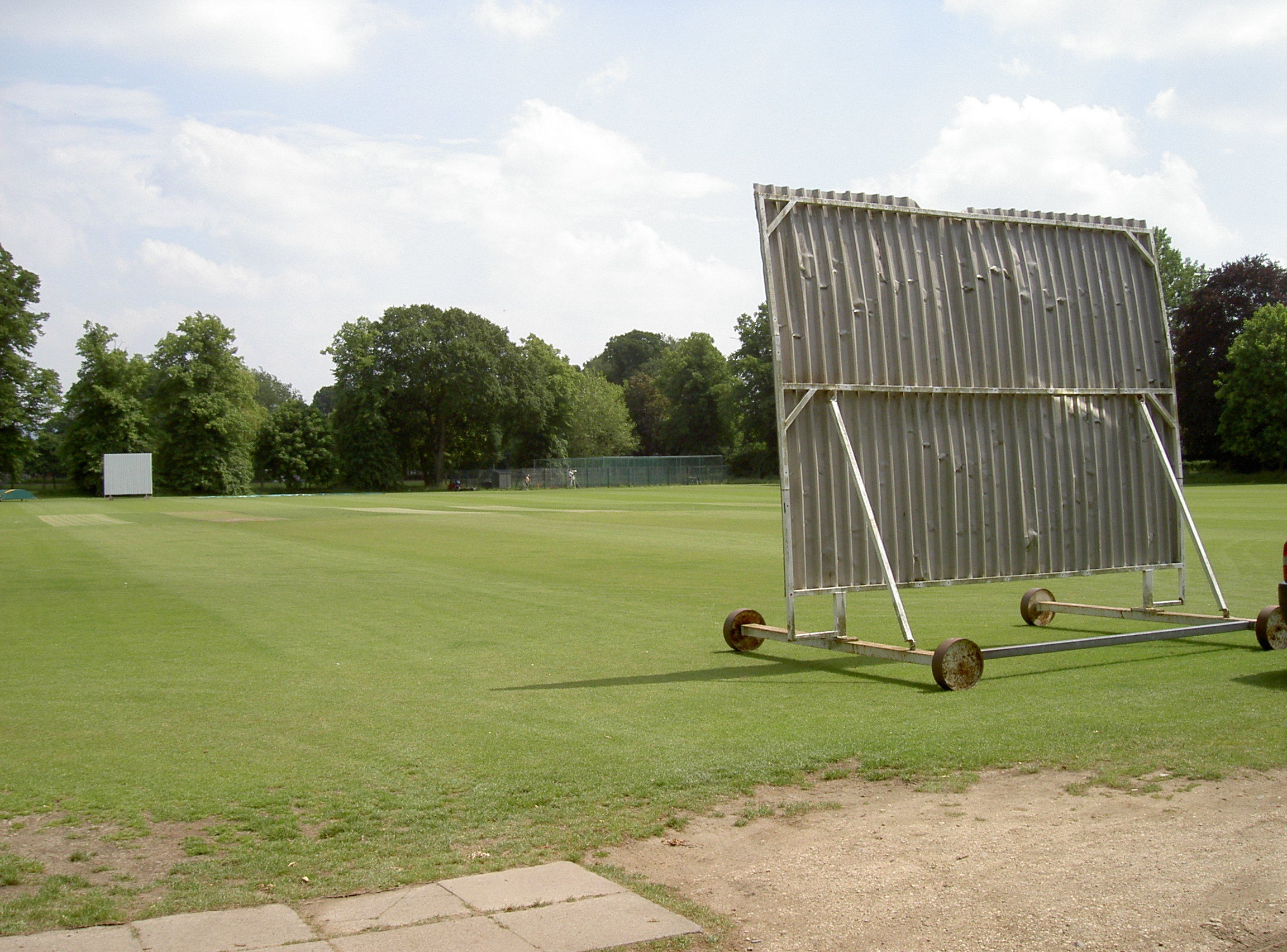
- Interactive map of Spa Ground

Ground information
- Location: Gloucester, Gloucestershire
- Country: England
- Establishment: 1867 (first recorded match)

Team information
Gloucestershire	(1882-1923)
Gloucester Rugby	(1873-1891)
- As of 11 September 2010; Source: Ground profile

Spa Ground is a cricket ground in Gloucester, Gloucestershire. The first recorded match on the ground was in 1867, when Gloucester played an All England Eleven.

== History ==
In 1882, Gloucestershire played Somerset in the grounds first first-class match. Gloucestershire played first-class matches at the ground from 1882 to 1923, playing a total of 56 first-class matches there, the last of which saw them play Leicestershire in the 1923 County Championship. One match of note came in 1907 when Gloucestershire played Northamptonshire. Winning the toss and batting first, Gloucestershire were bowled out for 60 in their first innings. Both George Thompson and William East took five wicket hauls. In reply, Northamptonshire were bowled out for just 12 runs, their lowest first-class total to date. George Dennett took 8 of the Northamptonshire wickets for the cost of 9 runs from 6 overs. In a continuation of the low scores, Gloucestershire were bowled out for 88 second time round, with Northamptonshire's second innings ending on 40/7 when rain brought an end to the match, with a draw the result.

Between 1873 and 1891, The Spa ground was also home to Gloucester Rugby.

During the 1986 ICC Trophy, the ground played host to its only international match to date between Fiji and the Netherlands.

In local domestic cricket, the ground is the home venue of Gloucester City Winget Cricket Club.
