= Bath Cricket Club =

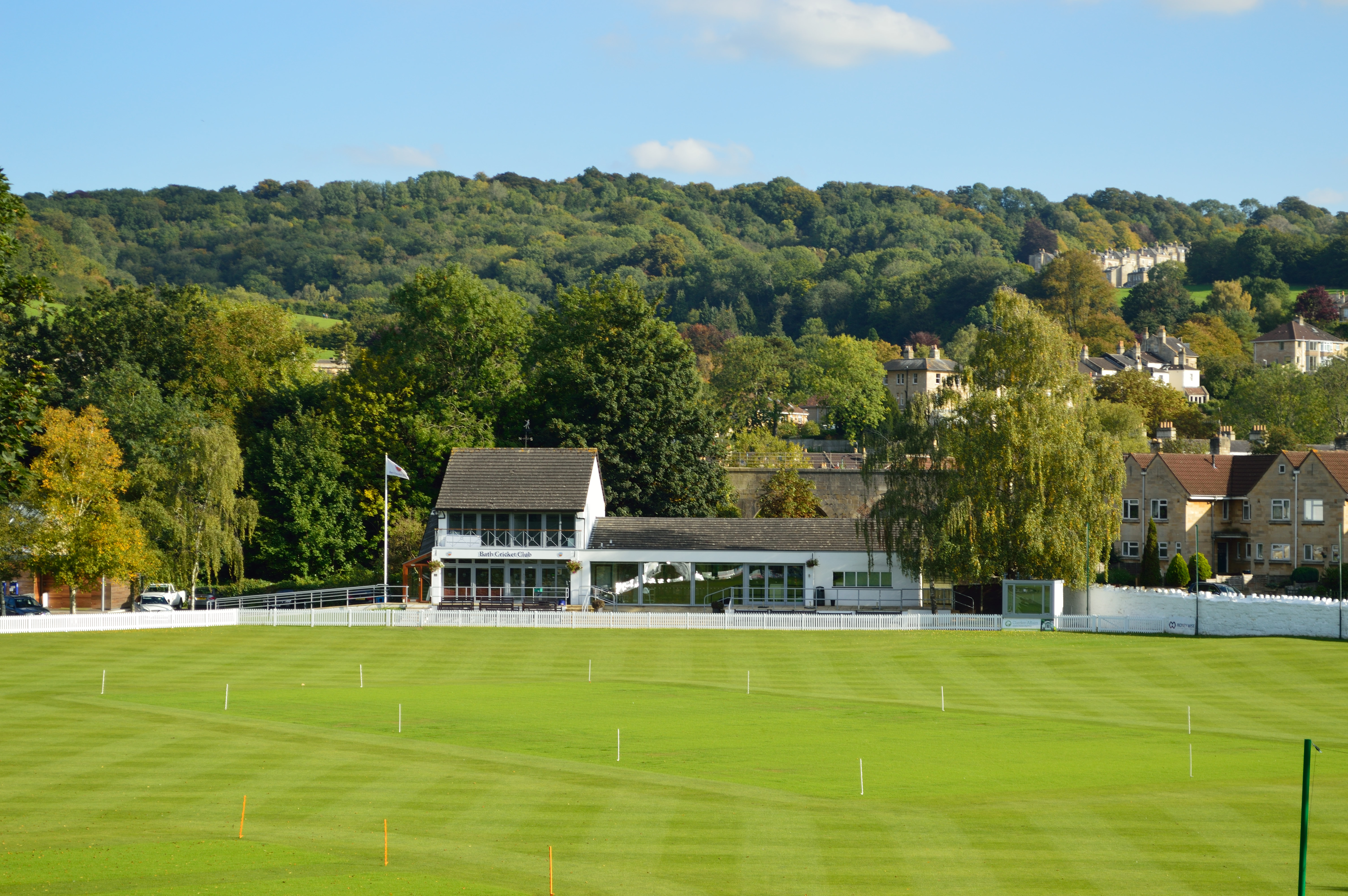
- Bath Cricket Club Pavilion

Team information
- Established: 1859
- Home venue: North Parade Ground

History
- No. of titles: 16
- Western League title wins: 1974, 1994, and 1998
- West of England Premier League title wins: 2023,2022, 2017, 2016, 2013, 2011, 2010, 2008, 2006, 2005, 2003, 2000, and 1999
- ECB National Club Championship wins: 2021

Bath Cricket Club is an English amateur cricket club based in the city of Bath, Somerset. The club was founded in 1859 and the Men's 1st XI compete in the West of England Premier League, which is an accredited ECB Premier League, the highest level for recreational club cricket in England and Wales. Bath Cricket Club currently run four Men's teams, and two Women's Teams. In 2003, Bath Cricket Club merged with Somerset Wanderers Women's cricket team. The Women's teams use the playing name of Bath Wanderers. The Women's 1st XI play in the West of England Premier League Women’s division. Bath CC Men’s 1st XI won the ECB National Club Championship in 2021.

Home matches are played at the North Parade Ground in Bath, which hosted a Women's One Day International match between England and India in August 2008. The ground had previously been the venue for two women's Twenty20 internationals in 2007, when England played New Zealand.

== History ==
Bath Cricket Club was formed in 1859, by a group from Bath's YMCA. The club initially played its home matches at Claverton Down, on the southern edge of Bath, but soon bought a ground closer to the centre of Bath from the 4th Duke of Cleveland, known as the Watermeadows, for £200. This became the North Parade Ground that the club have played on ever since. Having initially been called the Bath Association Cricket Club, in 1872 the club was renamed Bath Cricket Club. The men's first XI at the club was successful throughout the 1990s and 2000s, never finishing lower than fifth from 1991 onwards, and being champions in 1994, 1998, 1999, 2000, 2003, 2005, 2006, 2008, and 2010.

In 2011, for the first time in their history, Bath Cricket Club added the name of a sponsor onto their shirts, a move which the club say was necessary for their cricket school.

=== Men ===
- West of England Premier League
  - Champions: 2023,2022, 2017, 2016, 2013, 2011, 2010, 2008, 2006, 2005, 2003, 2000, and 1999
  - Runners-Up: 2019, 2018, 2014, 2012, 2004, 2002
- Western League (pre-1999)
  - Champions: 1998, 1994 and 1974
  - Runners-Up: 1996, 1991
- ECB National Club Cricket Championship
  - Champions: 2021
  - Runners-up: 1998, 2001, 2003
- Somerset Major 20/20 Cup
  - Champions: 2017,2018,2023
- Wepl t20
  - Champions:2019

=== Women ===
A partnership started in 2001 with Somerset Wanderers Ladies Cricket Club, and this led to a merger which places the Club at the leading edge of female community cricket development. Many girls play in predominantly boys teams, and also in senior men's teams. There are three female senior teams (known as Bath Wanderers) and the Club provides the majority of female players for Somerset and several at international level.

- West of England Premier League
  - Champions: 2023,2024
- Women's First XI - National Premier League
  - National Club Champions 2015
  - Winners of National Premier League (South): 2007
  - Runners-up in National Premier League (South): 2010, 2011
- Women's Second XI - National Premier League
  - South West Regional League Champions 2008
  - Gloucestershire Women's League Runners-up 2006
  - Somerset League Champions 2014, 2013

=== Youth ===
Bath Cricket have a strong record in developing youth cricket; the Youth set-up is quite strong with many players who play for Somerset. Bath operate youth teams from under 11 to U15 age groups, including girls teams. The youth teams largely play in the Bath & District Youth League; they also enter the national cricket youth competitions.

Youth Honours (National):-

- Lady Taverners U13 National Girls Competition - Champions 2003
- Portman BS U15 National Boys Competition - Finalists 2003
- Portman BS U15 National Boys Competition - Champions 2004 & 2012
- Lady Taverners U15 National Girls Competition - Runners-up 2004 & 2006
- Boys U13 National Competition - Champions 2007
- Boys U13 National t20 Competition - Champions 2022
