= West of England Premier League =

ECB Premier League

- Countries: England
- Administrator: ECB
- Format: Limited overs cricket
- First edition: 1999 (ECB Premier League)
- Tournament format: League
- Number of teams: 10 (Premier One)
- Current champion: Dumbleton CC
- Most successful: Bath CC (13 titles)

The West of England Premier League (WEPL) is the top level of competition for recreational club cricket in the West of England and is a designated ECB Premier League.

Since its inception in 1999, the most successful club has been Bath, having won the Premier One title on thirteen occasions. The only other clubs to have won the title on more than one occasion are Frocester (2007, 2014, and 2015), Clevedon (2018 and 2021), Taunton St Andrews (2001 and 2009), and Potterne (2019 and 2024).

== Structure ==
The WEPL covers the counties of Bristol, Somerset, Gloucestershire and Wiltshire, and is the top tier of the pyramid structure of leagues in the area. The league has seven divisions, with the top league, Premier One covering the entire region, and the remainder covering more localised areas. The seven divisions each have ten teams, and are split into three distinct 'tiers':

Premier One
Premier 2 Bristol & Somerset	Premier 2 Gloucestershire & Wiltshire
Bristol & N.Somerset	Somerset	Gloucestershire	Wiltshire

The structure changed after the 2015 season by eliminating Premier Division Two, so that the winners of the Bristol and Somerset Division and the Gloucestershire and Wiltshire Division are now promoted directly into Premier Division One.

There are four feeder leagues serving the WEPL, each having a direct link with one of the lower divisions as follows:

- Bristol and North Somerset - Bristol & District Cricket Association
- Somerset - Somerset Cricket League
- Gloucestershire - Gloucestershire County Cricket League
- Wiltshire - Wiltshire County Cricket League

== Winners ==
=== 1999–2006 ===
Year	First tier	Second tier	Third tier		Fourth tier		
Year	Premier One	Premier Two	Bristol & Somerset	Glos & Wilts	Bristol & N. Som	Somerset	Glos & Wilts Two
1999	Bath (1)						
2000	Bath (2)						
2001	Taunton St Andrews (1)						
2002	Keynsham (1)	Taunton	Westlands Sports	Frocester	Hanham	Glastonbury	Trowbridge
2003	Bath (3)	Frenchay	Glastonbury	Winget	Claverham	Taunton Deane	Lydney
2004	Cheltenham (1)	Glastonbury	Taunton Deane	Stroud	Winterbourne	Uphill Castle	Swindon
2005	Bath (4)	Frocester	Bridgwater	Trowbridge	Westbury and District	Winscombe	Gloucester City Winget
2006	Bath (5)	Weston-super-Mare	Knowle	Westbury and District	Timsbury	Minehead	Marshfield

=== 2007–2015 ===
In 2007 Gloucestershire/Wiltshire Two was replaced by separate divisions for Gloucestershire and Wiltshire.

Year	First tier	Second tier	Third tier		Fourth tier			
Year	Premier One	Premier Two	Bristol & Somerset	Glos & Wilts	Bristol & N. Som	Somerset	Gloucestershire	Wiltshire
2007	Frocester (1)	Downend	Lansdown	Warminster	Winterbourne	Winscombe	Rockhampton	Wootton Bassett
2008	Bath (6)	Bristol	Taunton	Chippenham	Bedminster	Ashcott and Shapwick	Stroud	Lechlade
2009	Taunton St Andrews (2)	Taunton	Ashcott and Shapwick	Westbury and District	Old Bristolians Westbury	Chard	Hatherley and Reddings	Potterne
2010	Bath (7)	Downend	Bristol West Indians	Gloucester City Winget	Bishopston	Uphill Castle	Dumbleton	Goatacre
2011	Bath (8)	Gloucester City Winget	Chard	Goatacre	Chipping Sodbury	Midsomer Norton	Painswick	Winsley
2012	Bridgwater (1)	Ashcott and Shapwick	Minehead	Cheltenham	Frenchay	Street	Dumbleton	Lechlade
2013	Bath (9)	Taunton Deane	Clevedon	Potterne	Chew Magna	Wembdon	Tewkesbury	Swindon
2014	Frocester (2)	Ilminster	Taunton	Lechlade	Lansdown	Frome	Apperley	Burbage and Easton Royal
2015	Frocester (3)	Potterne	Bedminster	Rockhampton	Claverham (Yatton)	North Perrott	Dumbleton	Trowbridge

=== 2016–present ===
In 2016 Premier Two was eliminated, and there were now two divisions in the second tier and four divisions in the third tier.

Year	First tier	Second tier		Third tier			
Year	Premier One	Bristol & Somerset	Glos & Wilts	Bristol & N. Som	Somerset	Gloucestershire	Wiltshire
2016	Bath (10)	Bedminster	Lechlade	Claverham (Yatton)	Glastonbury	Hatherley and Reddings	Westbury and District
2017	Bath (11)	Taunton St Andrews	Goatacre	Midsomer Norton	Weston super Mare	Dumbleton	Trowbridge
2018	Clevedon (1)	Lansdown	Cheltenham	Winterbourne	North Perrott	Frocester 2nd XI	Chippenham
2019	Potterne (1)	Taunton Deane	Chippenham	Bath 2nd XI	Frome	Hatherley and Reddings	Marshfield
2020	no competition						
2021	Clevedon (2)	Taunton St Andrews	Thornbury	Golden Hill	Shapwick and Polden	Corse and Staunton	Warminster
2022	Bath (12)	Bristol	Frocester	Keynsham	Bridgwater 2nd XI	Painswick	Royal Wootton Bassett
2023	Bath (13)	Bishopston	Burbage and Easton Royal	Congresbury	Wellington	Dumbleton	Avebury
2024	Potterne (2)	Downend	Thornbury	Old Bristolians Westbury	Taunton	Tewkesbury	Purton
2025	Bridgwater (2)						
2026	Dumbleton (1)						

== Premier One performance by season from 1999 ==
Key
Gold	Champions
Red	Relegated
Blue	Left League

Performance by season, from 1999
Club	1999	2000	2001	2002	2003	2004	2005	2006	2007	2008	2009	2010	2011	2012	2013	2014	2015	2016	2017	2018	2019	2021	2022	2023	2024	2025	2026
Ashcott and Shapwick															7	10											
Bath	1	1	3	2	1	2	1	1	4	1	4	1	1	2	1	2	3	1	1	2	2	3	1	1	4	3	9
Bedminster																			7	7	3	5	3	6	3	2	6
Bishopston																									10		
Bridgwater									8	8	6	2	3	1	5	5	7	5	8	6	5	6	4	4	2	1	3
Bristol (Note: Clifton Flax Bourton went out of existence after the 2001 season; many of their players then joined Optimists (originally an offshoot of Clifton) who adopted the name Optimists and Clifton, and changed their name to Bristol in 2005.)			2	6	3	8	9				8	8	7	6	3	7	8	6	4	5	10			3	5	6	8
Bristol West Indians			6	8	9		8	10																			
Burbage and Easton Royal																									6	7	5
Cheltenham		2	4	5	2	1	7	6	7	10											4	9					
Chippenham	4	3	9																			8	5	9			
Clevedon																	2	5	2	1	6	1	10				
Clifton Flax Bourton	2	7																									
Corsham				3	5	6	6	5	6	4	5	5	8	4	8	6	4	3	10								
Downend	9	6	10			9				7	10		5	3	6	4	6	8	5	3	8	10				9	
Dumbleton																											1
Frenchay						3	10																				
Frocester								4	1	3	3	4	2	8	2	1	1	2	3	9				5	8	8	4
Glastonbury							2	3	5	2	7	10															
Gloucester City Winget														10													
Goatacre																				10							
Ilminster										9				7	10		10										
Keynsham	6	8	7	1	6	4	3	8	9						9												
Knowle			8	9							9																
Lansdown	10			10																	7	4	7	7	9		
Lechlade																			9								
Midsomer Norton																											2
Optimists	7	10																									
Potterne																		4	6	4	1	2	2	2	1	4	7
Stroud	5	11																									
Taunton					7	5	5	9				9						10									
Taunton Deane												6	4	9		3	9					7	8	10			
Taunton St Andrews		5	1	7	4	7	4	2	2	6	1	3	6	5	4	8	5	9		8	9		6	8	7	10	
Thornbury	3	4	5	4	8	10		7	10				10										9			5	10
Trowbridge	11																										
Weston super Mare	8	9			10				3	5	2	7	9			9											
References																											
