= Gransden =

Gransden may refer to:

== People ==
- Antonia Gransden (1928–2020), English historian and medievalist
- K. W. Gransden, British scholar and poet

== Places ==
- Gransden and Waresley Woods, managed as a nature reserve
- Gransden Lodge Airfield, former wartime airfield 10 miles from Cambridge, England
- Great Gransden, civil parish and village in the Huntingdonshire district of Cambridgeshire, England
- Little Gransden, civil parish and village in South Cambridgeshire, England
- Little Gransden Airfield (IATA: N/A, ICAO: EGMJ) is a licensed airfield located near the village of Little Gransden
