= Glastonbury =

Town in Somerset, England

Coordinates: 51°08′51″N 2°43′03″W

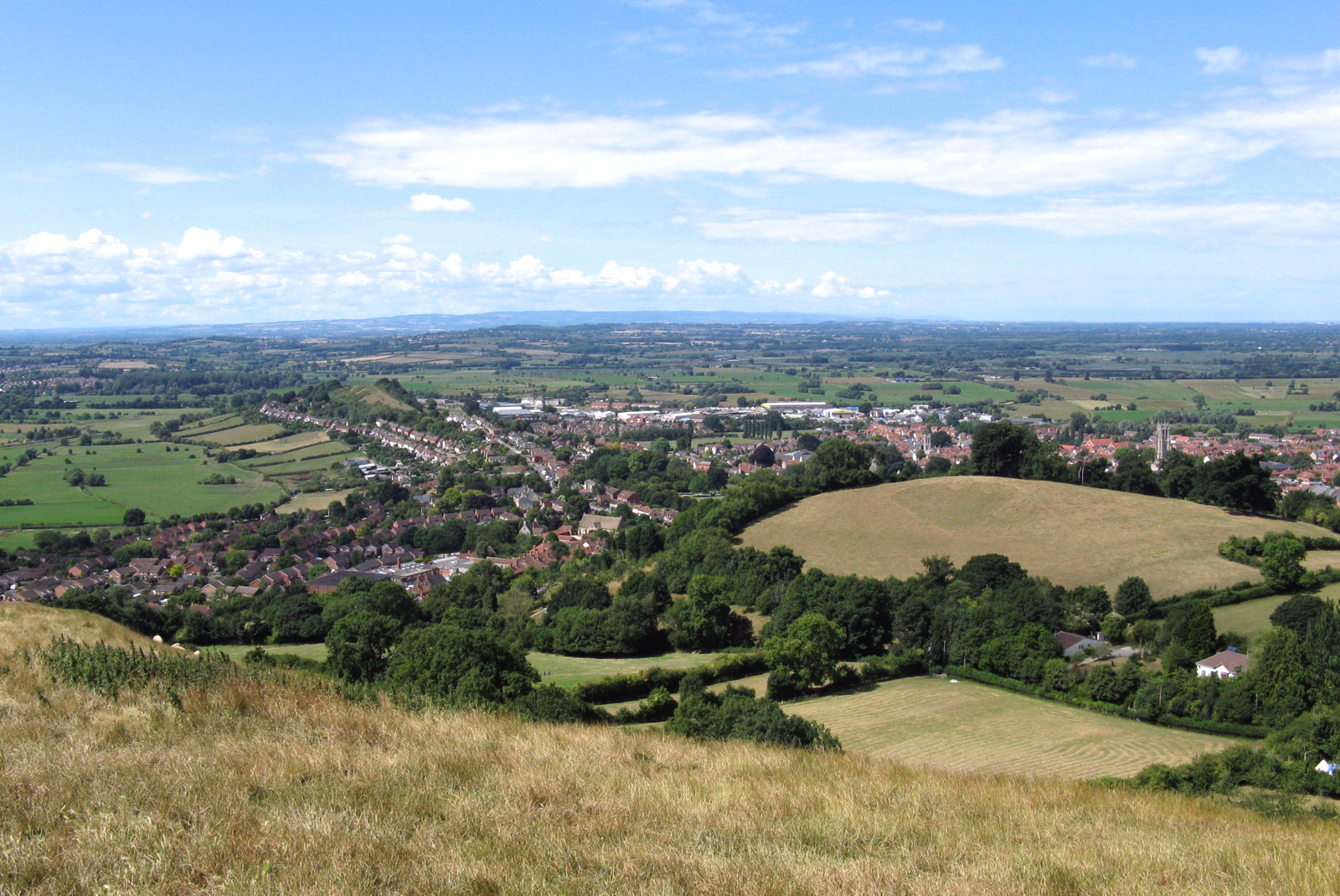
- A view of Glastonbury from the Tor

- Location within Somerset
- Population: 8,980 (Parish, 2021); 8,300 (Built-up area, 2021)
- OS grid reference: ST501390
- Civil parish: Glastonbury
- Unitary authority: Somerset Council
- Ceremonial county: Somerset
- Region: South West
- Country: England
- Sovereign state: United Kingdom
- Post town: Glastonbury
- Postcode district: BA6
- Dialling code: 01458
- Police: Avon and Somerset
- Fire: Devon and Somerset
- Ambulance: South Western
- UK Parliament: Glastonbury and Somerton

Glastonbury (/ˈɡlæstənbəri/ GLAST-ən-bər-ee, UK also /ˈɡlɑːst-/ GLAHST-) is a town and civil parish in Somerset, England. It is situated at a dry point on the low-lying Somerset Levels, 23 miles (37 km) south of Bristol. At the 2021 census, the parish had a population of 8,980 and the built-up area had a population of 8,300. The town is less than 1 mile (2 km) across the River Brue from Street, a village which is now larger than Glastonbury.

Evidence from timber trackways such as the Sweet Track show that the town has been inhabited since Neolithic times. Glastonbury Lake Village was an Iron Age village, close to the old course of the River Brue and Sharpham Park approximately 2 miles (3 km) west of Glastonbury, that dates back to the Bronze Age. Centwine was the first Saxon patron of Glastonbury Abbey, which dominated the town for the next 700 years and was one of the most important abbeys in England. Many of the oldest surviving buildings in the town, including the Tribunal, George Hotel and Pilgrims' Inn and the Somerset Rural Life Museum, which is based at the site of a 14th-century abbey manor barn, often referred to as a tithe barn, are associated with the abbey. The Church of St John the Baptist dates from the 15th century.

The town became a centre for commerce, which led to the construction of the market cross, Glastonbury Canal and the Glastonbury and Street railway station, the largest station on the original Somerset and Dorset Railway. The Brue Valley Living Landscape is a conservation project managed by the Somerset Wildlife Trust and nearby is the Ham Wall National Nature Reserve.

Glastonbury has been described as having a New Age community, and possibly being where New Age beliefs originated at the turn of the twentieth century. It is notable for myths and legends often related to Glastonbury Tor, concerning Joseph of Arimathea, the Holy Grail and King Arthur. Joseph is said to have arrived in Glastonbury and stuck his staff into the ground, when it flowered miraculously into the Glastonbury Thorn. The presence of a landscape zodiac around the town has been suggested but no evidence has been discovered. The Glastonbury Festival, held in the nearby village of Pilton, takes its name from the town.

== History ==
=== Prehistory ===
During the 7th millennium BC the sea level rose and flooded the valleys and low-lying ground surrounding Glastonbury so the Mesolithic people occupied seasonal camps on the higher ground, indicated by scatters of flints. The Neolithic people continued to exploit the reedswamps for their natural resources and started to construct wooden trackways. These included the Sweet Track, west of Glastonbury, which is one of the oldest engineered roads known and was the oldest timber trackway discovered in Northern Europe, until the 2009 discovery of a 6,000-year-old trackway in Belmarsh Prison. Tree-ring dating (dendrochronology) of the timbers has enabled very precise dating of the track, showing it was built in 3807 or 3806 BC. It has been claimed to be the oldest road in the world. The track was discovered in the course of peat digging in 1970, and is named after its discoverer, Ray Sweet. It extended across the marsh between what was then an island at Westhay, and a ridge of high ground at Shapwick, a distance close to 2,000 metres (1.2 mi). The track is one of a network of tracks that once crossed the Somerset Levels. Built in the 39th century BC, during the Neolithic period, the track consisted of crossed poles of ash, oak and lime (Tilia) which were driven into the waterlogged soil to support a walkway that mainly consisted of oak planks laid end-to-end. Since the discovery of the Sweet Track, it has been determined that it was built along the route of an even earlier track, the Post Track, dating from 3838 BC, and so 30 years older.

Glastonbury Lake Village was an Iron Age village, close to the old course of the River Brue, on the Somerset Levels near Godney, some 3 miles (5 km) north west of Glastonbury. It covers an area of 400 feet (120 m) north to south by 300 feet (90 m) east to west, and housed around 100 people in five to seven groups of houses, each for an extended family, with sheds and barns, made of hazel and willow covered with reeds, and surrounded either permanently or at certain times by a wooden palisade. The village was built in about 300 BC and occupied into the early Roman period (around AD 100) when it was abandoned, possibly due to a rise in the water level. It was built on a morass on an artificial foundation of timber filled with brushwood, bracken, rubble and clay.

Sharpham Park is a 300-acre (120-hectare) historic park, 2 miles (3 km) west of Glastonbury, which dates back to the Bronze Age.

=== Middle Ages ===
The name Glastonbury is derived from Old English: Glæstyngabyrig. When the settlement is first recorded in the 7th and the early 8th century, it was called Glestingaburg. The burg element is Old English and could refer either to a fortified place such as a burh or, more likely, a monastic enclosure; however the Glestinga element is obscure, and may derive from a Celtic personal name or from Old English (either from a name or otherwise). It may derive from a person or kindred group named Glast. .

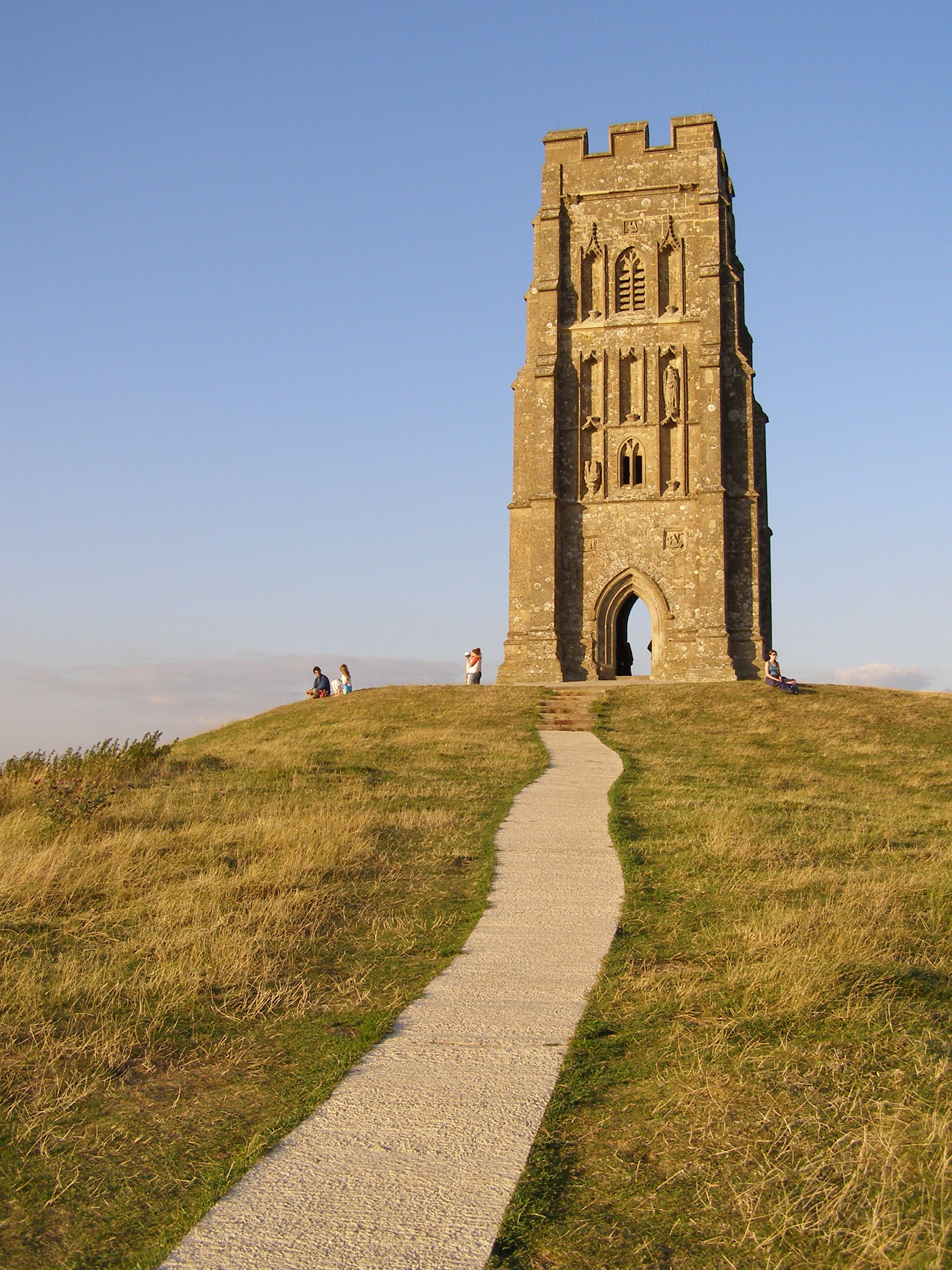
Remains of St Michael's Church at the summit of Glastonbury Tor

Hugh Ross Williamson cites a tale about St. Collen, one of the earliest hermits to inhabit the Tor before the Abbey was built by St. Patrick, which has the Saint summoned by the King of the Fairies, Gwyn, to the summit of the Tor. Upon arrival there he beholds a hovering mansion inhabited by handsomely dressed courtiers and King Gwyn on a throne of gold; holy water disperses the apparition. This is from Druid mythology, in which the mansion is made of glass so as to receive the spirits of the dead, which were supposed to depart from the summit of the Tor. This was the chief reason why the chapel, and later the church, of St. Michael were built on the high hill; St. Michael being the chief patron against diabolic attacks which the monks believed the Fairy King to be numbered among. Accordingly, Williamson posits that the Tor was named after the glassy mansion of the dead.

William of Malmesbury in his De Antiquitate Glastonie Ecclesie gives the Old Welsh Ineswitrin (or Ynys Witrin) as its earliest name, and asserts that the founder of the town was the eponymous Glast, a descendant of Cunedda.

Centwine (676–685) was the first Saxon patron of Glastonbury Abbey. King Edmund Ironside was buried at the abbey. The Domesday Book of 1086 indicates that in the hundred of Glastingberiensis, the Abbey was the Lord in 1066 prior to the arrival of William the Conqueror, then tenant-in chief with Godwin as Lord of Glastingberi in 1086.

To the southwest of the town centre is Beckery, which was once a village in its own right but is now part of the suburbs. Around the 7th and 8th centuries it was occupied by a small monastic community associated with a cemetery. Archaeological excavations in 2016 uncovered 50 to 60 skeletons thought to be those of monks from Beckery Chapel during the 5th or early 6th century.

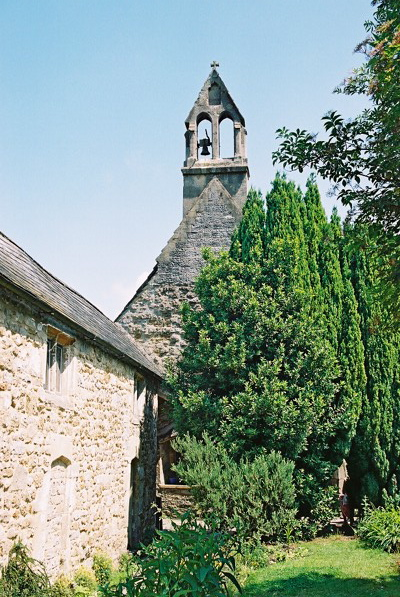
Magdalene Chapel

Sharpham Park was granted by King Eadwig to the then abbot Æthelwold in 957. In 1191 Sharpham Park was gifted by the soon-to-be King John I to the Abbots of Glastonbury, who remained in possession of the park and house until the dissolution of the monasteries in 1539. From 1539 to 1707 the park was owned by the Duke of Somerset, Sir Edward Seymour, brother of Queen Jane; the Thynne family of Longleat, and the family of Sir Henry Gould. Edward Dyer was born here in 1543. The house is now a private residence and Grade II* listed building. It was the birthplace of Sir Edward Dyer (died 1607) an Elizabethan poet and courtier, the writer Henry Fielding (1707–54), and the cleric William Gould.

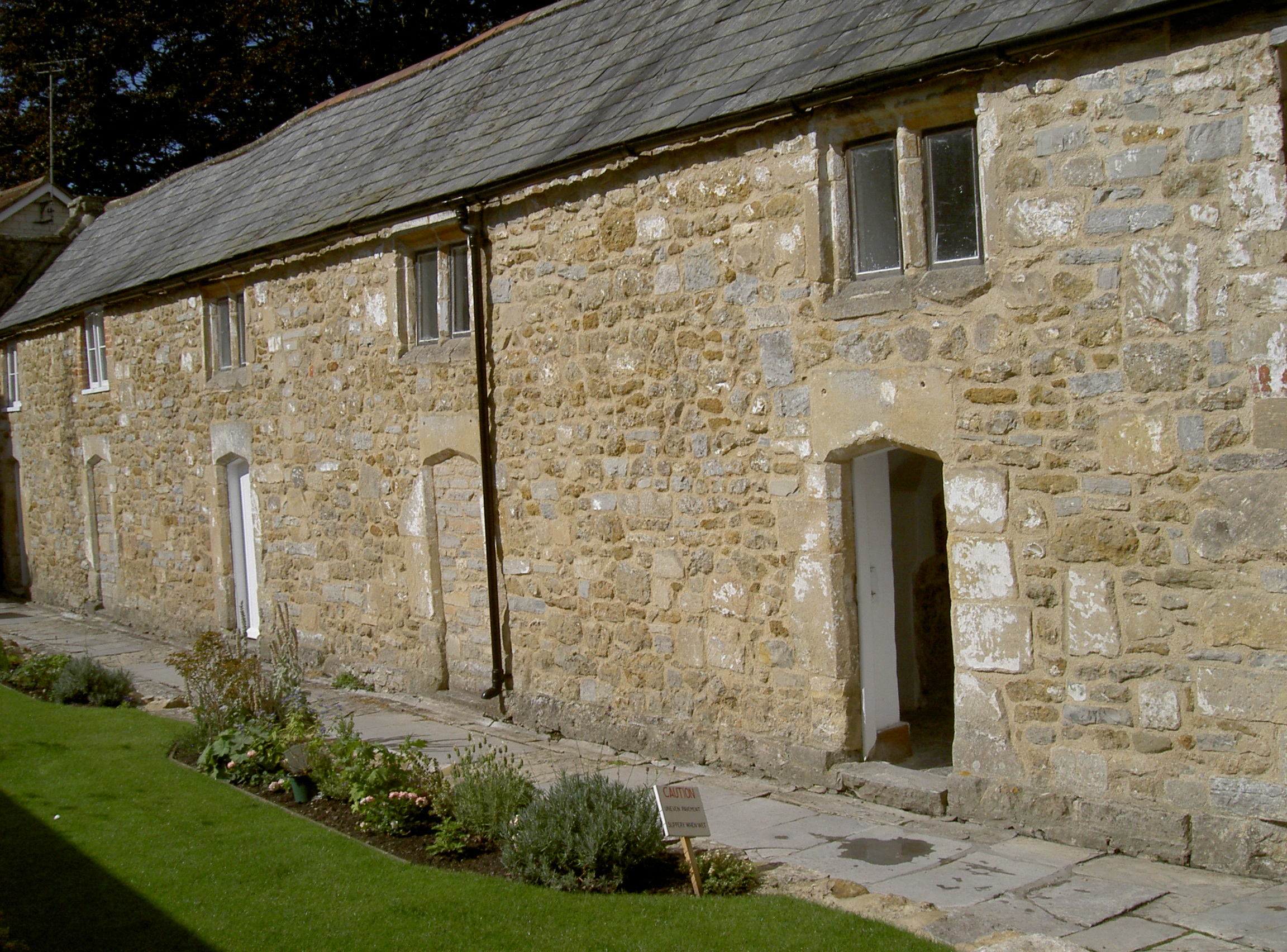
Hospital of St Mary Magdalene

In the 1070s St Margaret's Chapel was built on Magdelene Street, originally as a hospital and later as almshouses for the poor. The building dates from 1444. The roof of the hall is thought to have been removed after the Dissolution, and some of the building was demolished in the 1960s. It is Grade II* listed, and a scheduled monument. In 2010 plans were announced to restore the building.

During the Middle Ages the town largely depended on the abbey but was also a centre for the wool trade until the 18th century. A Saxon-era canal connected the abbey to the River Brue. Richard Whiting, the last Abbot of Glastonbury, was executed with two of his monks on 15 November 1539 during the Dissolution of the Monasteries.

During the Second Cornish Uprising of 1497 Perkin Warbeck surrendered when he heard that Giles, Lord Daubeney's troops, loyal to Henry VII, were camped at Glastonbury.

=== Early modern ===
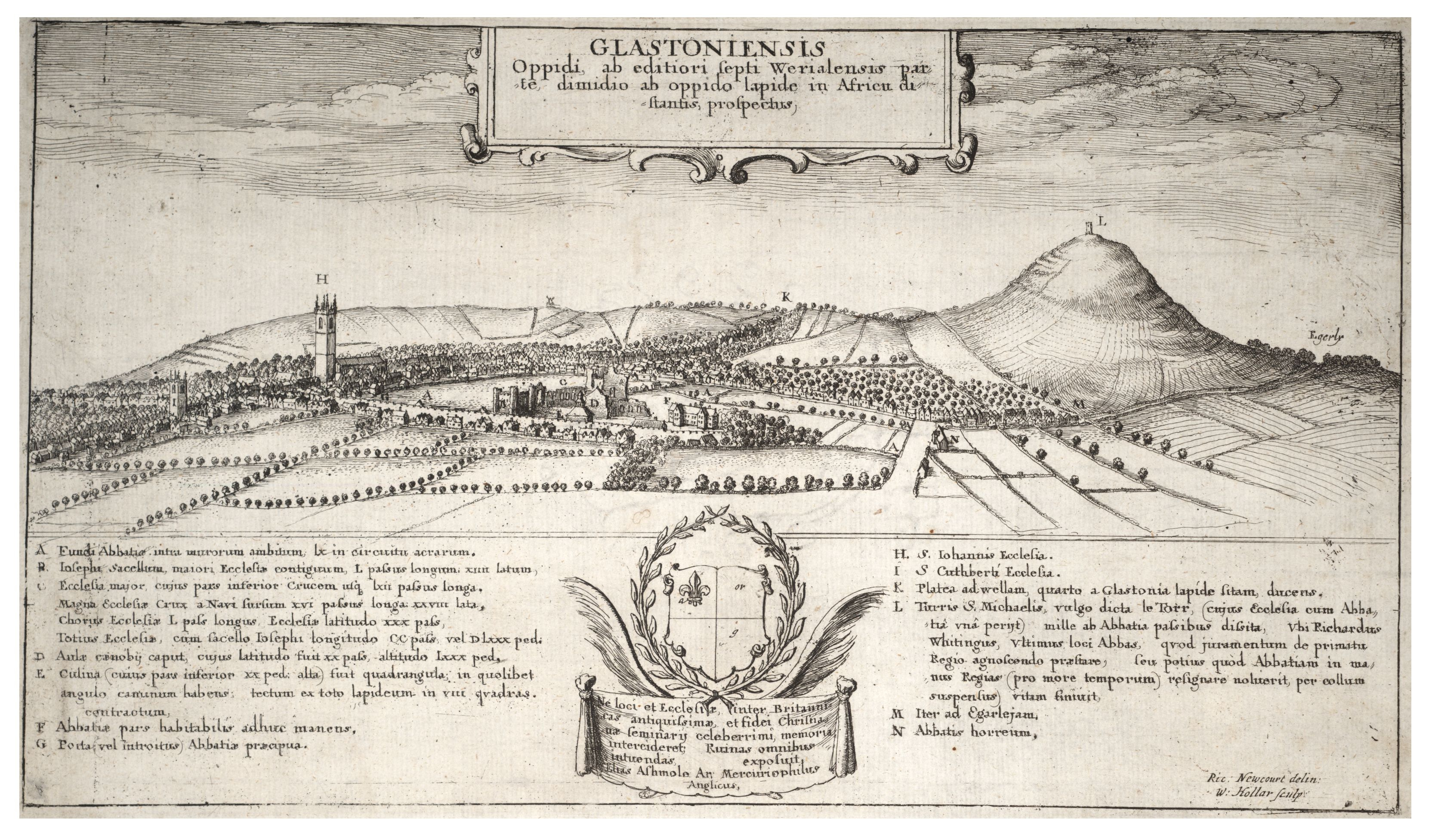
17th-century engraving of Glastonbury by Wenceslaus Hollar

In 1693 Glastonbury, Connecticut was founded and named after the English town from which some of the settlers had emigrated. It is rumored to have originally been called "Glistening Town" until the mid-19th century, when the name was changed to match the spelling of Glastonbury, England, but in fact, residents of the Connecticut town believe this to be a myth, based on the Glastonbury Historical Society's records. A representation of the Glastonbury thorn is incorporated onto the town seal.

The Somerset town's charter of incorporation was received in 1705. Growth in the trade and economy largely depended on the drainage of the surrounding moors. The opening of the Glastonbury Canal produced an upturn in trade, and encouraged local building. The parish was part of the hundred of Glaston Twelve Hides, until the 1730s when it became a borough in its own right.

Glastonbury Inclosure Act 1721
- Act of Parliament
- Parliament of Great Britain
- Long title: An Act for enclosing Glastonbury Commons, in the County of Somerset.
- Citation: 8 Geo. 1. c. 16 Pr.
- Territorial extent: Great Britain

Dates
- Royal assent: 7 March 1722
- Commencement: 19 October 1721 (Note: Start of session.)

Status: Current legislation

The Glastonbury Inclosure Act 1721 (8 Geo. 1. c. 16 Pr.) was passed to drain Common Moor, to the north of Glastonbury. A windmill was used to pump the water.

=== Modern history ===
By the middle of the 19th century, the Glastonbury Canal drainage problems and competition from the new railways caused a decline in trade, and the town's economy became depressed. The canal was closed on 1 July 1854, and the lock and aqueducts on the upper section were dismantled. The railway opened on 17 August 1854. The lower sections of the canal were given to the Commissioners for Sewers, for use as a drainage ditch. The final section was retained to provide a wharf for the railway company, which was used until 1936, when it passed to the Commissioners of Sewers and was filled in. The Central Somerset Railway merged with the Dorset Central Railway to become the Somerset and Dorset Railway. The main line to Glastonbury closed in 1966.

In the Northover district industrial production of sheepskins, woollen slippers and, later, boots and shoes, developed in conjunction with the growth of C&J Clark in Street. Clarks still has its headquarters in Street, but shoes are no longer manufactured there. Instead, in 1993, redundant factory buildings were converted to form Clarks Village, the first purpose-built factory outlet in the United Kingdom.

During the 19th and 20th centuries tourism developed based on the rise of antiquarianism, the association with the abbey and mysticism of the town. This was aided by accessibility via the rail and road network, which has continued to support the town's economy and led to a steady rise in resident population since 1801.

Glastonbury received national media coverage in 1999 when cannabis plants were found in the town's floral displays.

== Mythology and legends ==
Glastonbury is notable for myths and legends concerning Joseph of Arimathea, the Holy Grail and King Arthur as recorded by ancient historians William of Malmesbury, Venerable Bede, Gerald of Wales and Geoffrey of Monmouth. Many long-standing and cherished legends were examined in a four-year study by archaeologists, led by Professor Roberta Gilchrist, at the University of Reading, who, amongst other findings, speculated that the connection with King Arthur and his Queen, Guinevere, was created deliberately by the monks in 1184 to meet a financial crisis caused by a devastating fire. Other myths examined include the visit by Jesus, the building of the oldest church in England, and the flowering of the walking stick. Roberta Gilchrist stated, "We didn't claim to disprove the legendary associations, nor would we wish to". The site of King Arthur's supposed grave contained material dating from between the 11th and 15th centuries. Gilchrist said, "That doesn't dispel the Arthurian legend, it just means the pit [20th century archaeologist Ralegh Radford] excavated he rather over-claimed." The study made new archaeological finds; its leader found Glastonbury to be a remarkable archaeological site. The new results were reported on the Glastonbury Abbey Web site, and were to be incorporated into the Abbey's guidebook; however, the leader of the study, who became a trustee of Glastonbury, said "We are not in the business of destroying people's beliefs ... A thousand years of beliefs and legends are part of the intangible history of this remarkable place". Gilchrist went on to say, "archaeology can help us to understand how legends evolve and what people in the past believed". She noted that the project has actually uncovered the first definitive proof of occupation at the Glastonbury Abbey site during the fifth century—when Arthur allegedly lived.

The legend that Joseph of Arimathea retrieved certain holy relics was introduced by the French poet Robert de Boron in his 13th-century version of the grail story, thought to have been a trilogy though only fragments of the later books survive today. The work became the inspiration for the later Vulgate Cycle of Arthurian tales.

De Boron's account relates how Joseph captured Jesus's blood in a cup (the "Holy Grail") which was subsequently brought to Britain. The Vulgate Cycle reworked Boron's original tale. Joseph of Arimathea was no longer the chief character in the Grail origin: Joseph's son, Josephus, took over his role of the Grail keeper. The earliest versions of the grail romance, however, do not call the grail "holy" or mention anything about blood, Joseph or Glastonbury.

In 1191, monks at the abbey claimed to have found the graves of Arthur and Guinevere to the south of the Lady Chapel of the Abbey Church, which was visited by a number of contemporary historians including Giraldus Cambrensis. The remains were later moved and were lost during the Reformation. Many scholars suspect that this discovery was a pious forgery to substantiate the antiquity of Glastonbury's foundation, and increase its renown.

An early Welsh poem links Arthur to the Tor in an account of a confrontation between Arthur and Melwas, who had kidnapped Queen Guinevere.

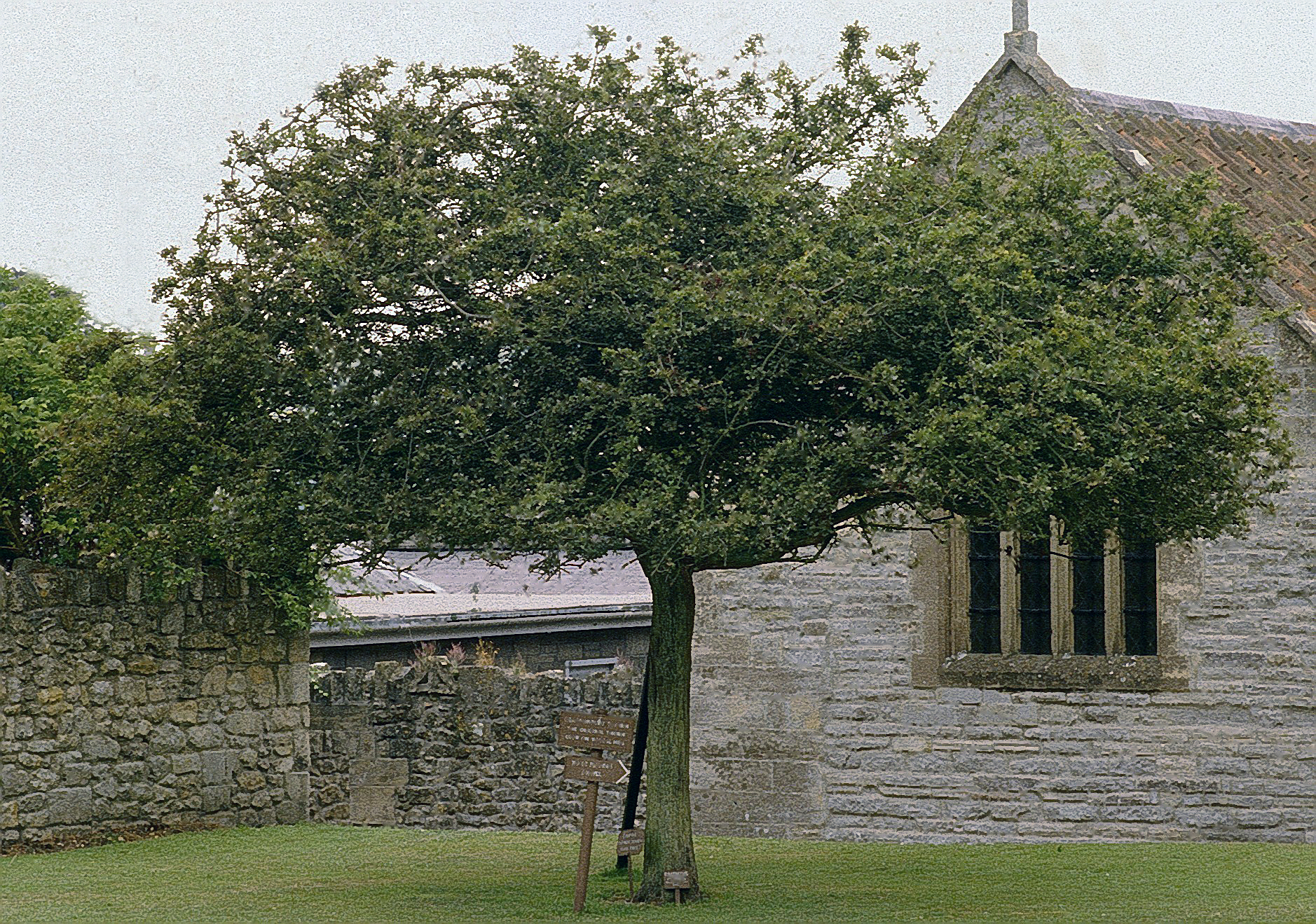
Holy Thorn, summer 1984. Died in 1991.

Joseph is said to have arrived in Glastonbury by boat over the flooded Somerset Levels. On disembarking he stuck his staff into the ground and it flowered miraculously into the Glastonbury Thorn (also called Holy Thorn). This is said to explain a hybrid Crataegus monogyna (hawthorn) tree that only grows within a few miles of Glastonbury, and which flowers twice annually, once in spring and again around Christmas time (depending on the weather). Each year a sprig of thorn is cut, by the local Anglican vicar and the eldest child from St John's School, and sent to the Queen.

The original Holy Thorn was a centre of pilgrimage in the Middle Ages but was chopped down during the English Civil War. A replacement thorn was planted in the 20th century on Wearyall hill (originally in 1951 to mark the Festival of Britain, but the thorn had to be replanted the following year as the first attempt did not take). The Wearyall Hill Holy Thorn was vandalised in 2010 and all its branches were chopped off. It initially showed signs of recovery but by 2014 appeared to be dead and was cut down by the landowner in 2019. A new sapling has been planted nearby. Many other examples of the thorn grow throughout Glastonbury including those in the grounds of Glastonbury Abbey, St Johns Church and Chalice Well.

Today, Glastonbury Abbey presents itself as "traditionally the oldest above-ground Christian church in the world," which according to the legend was built at Joseph's behest to house the Holy Grail, 65 or so years after the death of Jesus. The legend also says that as a child, Jesus had visited Glastonbury along with Joseph. The legend probably was encouraged during the medieval period when religious relics and pilgrimages were profitable business for abbeys. William Blake mentioned the legend in a poem that became a popular hymn, "Jerusalem".

=== Glastonbury zodiac ===
In 1934 artist Katherine Maltwood suggested a landscape zodiac, a map of the stars on a gigantic scale, formed by features in the landscape such as roads, streams and field boundaries, could be found situated around Glastonbury. She held that the "temple" was created by Sumerians about 2700 BC. The idea of a prehistoric landscape zodiac fell into disrepute when two independent studies examined the Glastonbury Zodiac, one by Ian Burrow in 1975 and the other by Tom Williamson and Liz Bellamy in 1983. These both used standard methods of landscape historical research. Both studies concluded that the evidence contradicted the idea of an ancient zodiac. The eye of Capricorn identified by Maltwood was a haystack. The western wing of the Aquarius phoenix was a road laid in 1782 to run around Glastonbury, and older maps dating back to the 1620s show the road had no predecessors. The Cancer boat (not a crab as in conventional western astrology) consists of a network of 18th-century drainage ditches and paths. There are some Neolithic paths preserved in the peat of the bog formerly comprising most of the area, but none of the known paths match the lines of the zodiac features. There is no support for this theory, or for the existence of the "temple" in any form, from conventional archaeologists. Glastonbury is also said to be the centre of several ley lines.

== Governance ==
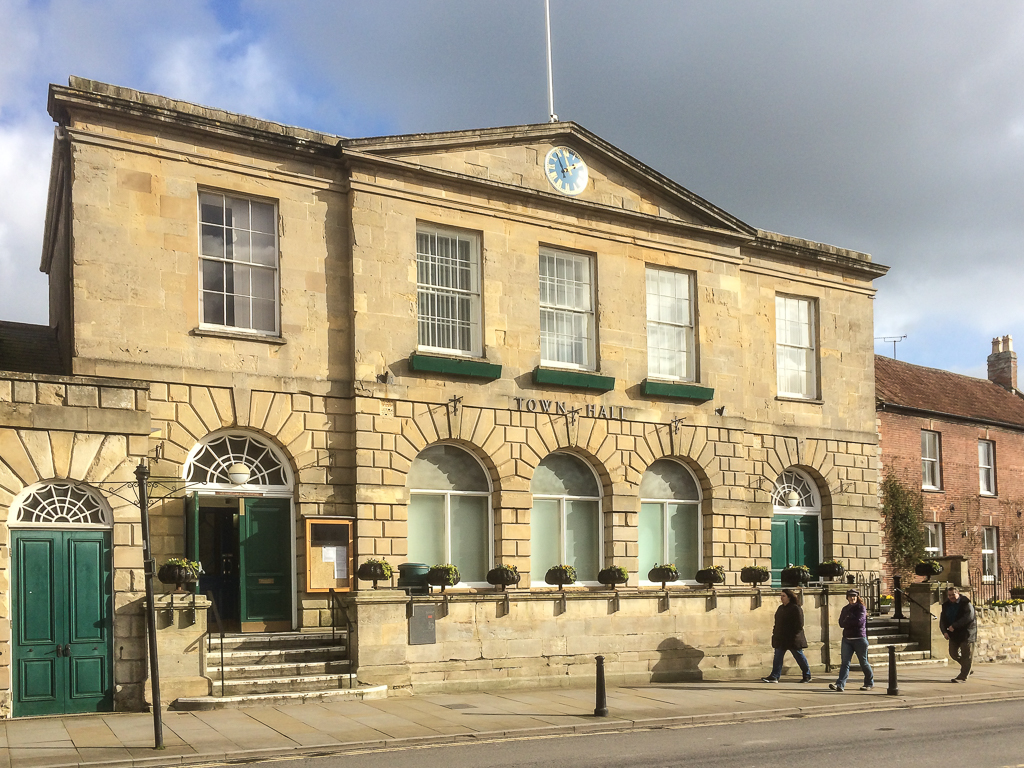
Glastonbury Town Hall

There are two tiers of local government covering Glastonbury, at parish (town) and unitary authority level: Glastonbury Town Council and Somerset Council. The town council is based at Glastonbury Town Hall on Magdalene Street. The town hall was built in 1814 and has a two-storey late Georgian ashlar front. It is a Grade II* listed building.

For national elections, Glastonbury forms part of the Glastonbury and Somerton constituency.

=== Administrative history ===
Glastonbury was an ancient parish in the Glaston Twelve Hides hundred of Somerset. As well as the town itself, the parish included surrounding rural areas, which historically included Sharpham and West Pennard. In 1726, the parish of Glastonbury was split into the two ecclesiastical parishes of Glastonbury St John the Baptist and Glastonbury St Benedict, but it continued to be treated as a single parish for the civil purposes of administering the poor laws which had been introduced in the 17th century. The chapelry of West Pennard was treated as a separate civil parish under the poor laws and subsequently also became a separate ecclesiastical parish in 1824.

In 1705, the town was granted a municipal charter, incorporating it as a borough. The borough boundaries covered most but not all of the parish. In 1836, the borough was reformed to become a municipal borough under the Municipal Corporations Act 1835, which standardised how most boroughs operated across the country. Under the Local Government Act 1894, civil parishes were no longer allowed to straddle borough boundaries, and so the Sharpham area, which lay outside the borough at the western end of the old parish, was made a separate civil parish.

The borough of Glastonbury was abolished in 1974 under the Local Government Act 1972. The area then became part of the new Mendip District. A successor parish called Glastonbury covering the former borough was created as part of the 1974 reforms, with its parish council taking the name Glastonbury Town Council.

Mendip district was abolished in 2023. Somerset County Council then took over district-level functions across its area, making it a unitary authority, and was renamed Somerset Council.

=== Twinning ===
Glastonbury is twinned with the Greek island of Patmos, and Lalibela, Ethiopia.

== Geography ==
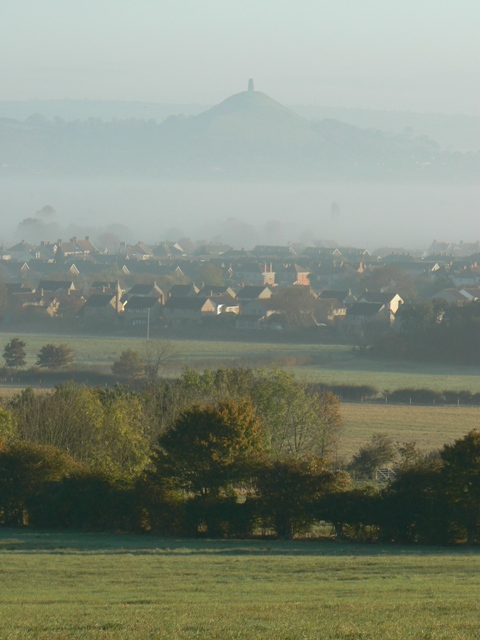
Street and Glastonbury Tor viewed from Walton Hill

The walk up the Tor to the distinctive tower at the summit (the partially restored remains of an old church) is rewarded by vistas of the mid-Somerset area, including the Levels which are drained marshland. From there, on a dry point, 158 metres (518 ft) above sea level, it is easy to appreciate how Glastonbury was once an island and, in the winter, the surrounding moors are often flooded, giving that appearance once more. It is an agricultural region typically with open fields of permanent grass, surrounded by ditches with willow trees. Access to the moors and Levels is by "droves", i.e., green lanes. The Levels and inland moors can be 6 metres (20 ft) below peak tides and have large areas of peat. The low-lying areas are underlain by much older Triassic age formations of Upper Lias sand that protrude to form what would once have been islands and include Glastonbury Tor. The lowland landscape was formed only during the last 10,000 years, following the end of the last ice age.

The low-lying damp ground can produce a visual effect known as a Fata Morgana. This optical phenomenon occurs because rays of light are strongly bent when they pass through air layers of different temperatures in a steep thermal inversion where an atmospheric duct has formed. The Italian name Fata Morgana is derived from the name of Morgan le Fay, who was alternatively known as Morgane, Morgain, Morgana and other variants. Morgan le Fay was described as a powerful sorceress and antagonist of King Arthur and Queen Guinevere in the Arthurian legend.

Glastonbury is less than 1 mile (2 km) across the River Brue from the village of Street. At the time of King Arthur the Brue formed a lake just south of the hilly ground on which Glastonbury stands. This lake is one of the locations suggested by Arthurian legend as the home of the Lady of the Lake. Pomparles Bridge stood at the western end of this lake, guarding Glastonbury from the south, and it is suggested that it was here that Sir Bedivere threw Excalibur into the waters after King Arthur fell at the Battle of Camlann. The old bridge was replaced by a reinforced concrete arch bridge in 1911.

Until the 13th century, the direct route to the sea at Highbridge was prevented by gravel banks and peat near Westhay. The course of the river partially encircled Glastonbury from the south, around the western side (through Beckery), and then north through the Panborough-Bleadney gap in the Wedmore-Wookey Hills, to join the River Axe just north of Bleadney. This route made it difficult for the officials of Glastonbury Abbey to transport produce from their outlying estates to the abbey, and when the valley of the River Axe was in flood it backed up to flood Glastonbury itself. Some time between 1230 and 1250 a new channel was constructed westwards into Meare Pool north of Meare, and further westwards to Mark Moor. The Brue Valley Living Landscape is a conservation project based on the Somerset Levels and Moors and managed by the Somerset Wildlife Trust. The project commenced in January 2009 and aims to restore, recreate and reconnect habitat, ensuring that wildlife is enhanced and capable of sustaining itself in the face of climate change, while guaranteeing farmers and other landowners can continue to use their land profitably. It is one of an increasing number of landscape-scale conservation projects in the UK.

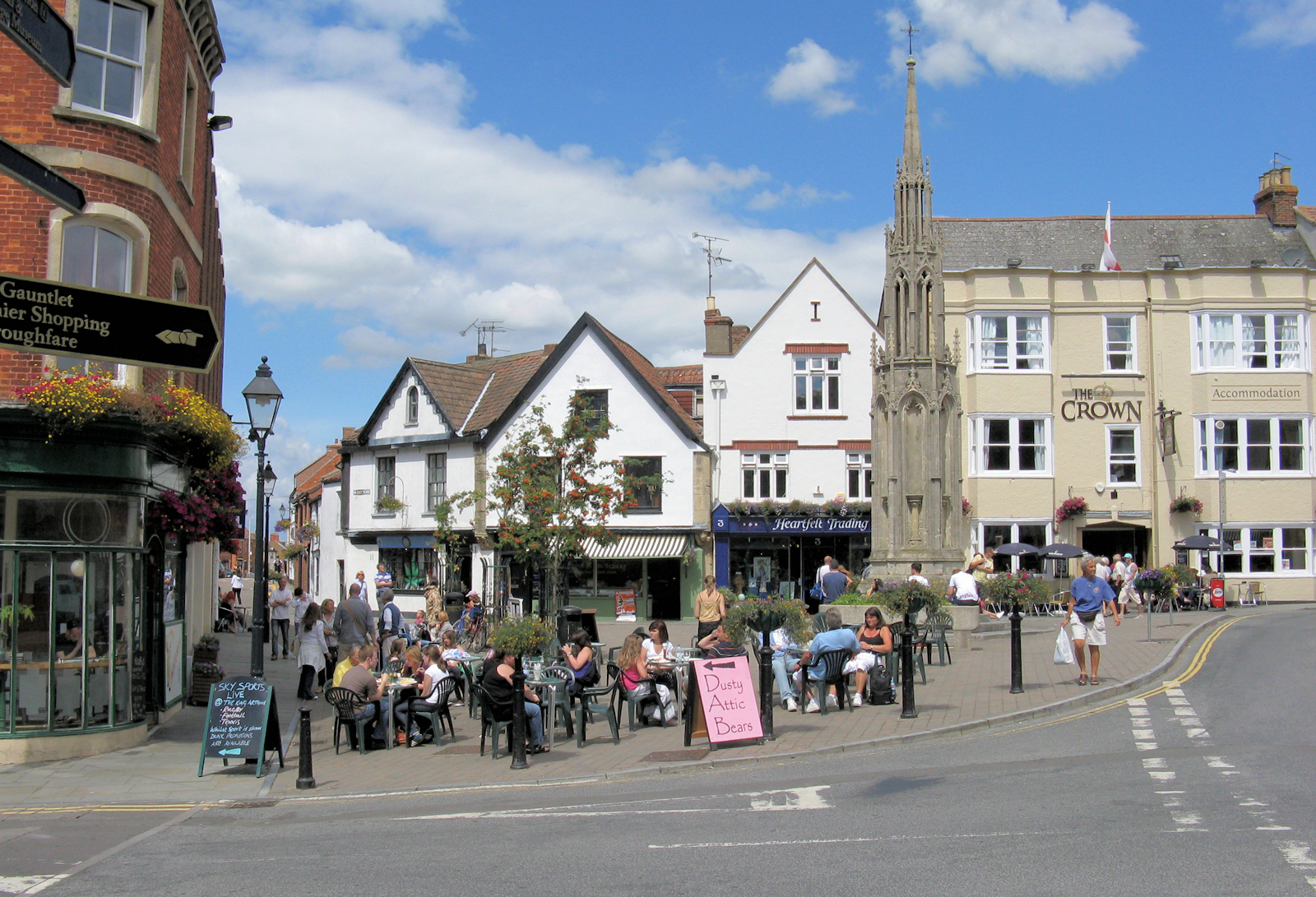
The town centre in summer 2010

The Ham Wall National Nature Reserve, 4 kilometres (2.5 mi) west of Glastonbury, is managed by the Royal Society for the Protection of Birds. This new wetland habitat has been established from out peat diggings and now consists of areas of reedbed, wet scrub, open water and peripheral grassland and woodland. Bird species living on the site include the bearded tit and the Eurasian bittern.

The Whitelake River rises between two low limestone ridges to the north of Glastonbury, part of the southern edge of the Mendip Hills. The confluence of the two small streams that make the Whitelake River is on Worthy Farm, the site of the Glastonbury Festival, between the small villages of Pilton and Pylle.

== Climate ==
Along with the rest of South West England, Glastonbury has a temperate climate which is generally wetter and milder than the rest of the country. The annual mean temperature is approximately 10 °C (50.0 °F). Seasonal temperature variation is less extreme than most of the United Kingdom because of the adjacent sea temperatures. The summer months of July and August are the warmest with mean daily maxima of approximately 21 °C (69.8 °F). In winter mean minimum temperatures of 1 or 2 °C (33.8 or 35.6 °F) are common. In the summer the Azores high pressure affects the south-west of England, however convective cloud sometimes forms inland, reducing the number of hours of sunshine. Annual sunshine rates are slightly less than the regional average of 1,600 hours. In December 1998 there were 20 days without sun recorded at Yeovilton. Most of the rainfall in the south-west is caused by Atlantic depressions or by convection. Most of the rainfall in autumn and winter is caused by the Atlantic depressions, which is when they are most active. In summer, a large proportion of the rainfall is caused by sun heating the ground leading to convection and to showers and thunderstorms. Average rainfall is around 700 mm (28 in). About 8–15 days of snowfall is typical. November to March have the highest mean wind speeds, and June to August have the lightest winds. The predominant wind direction is from the south-west.

== Economy ==
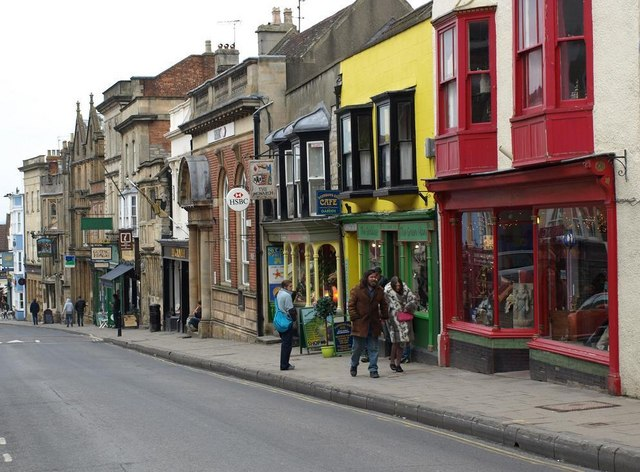
The High Street

Glastonbury has for centuries been a centre for pilgrimage and spirituality of many kinds. The town supports a wide variety of alternative shops.

The outskirts of Glastonbury contain a large, light industrial, former sheepskin and slipper factory site, as well as a DIY store. The larger site was once owned by Morlands, and is slowly being redeveloped. The 31-acre (13 ha) site of the old Morlands factory was scheduled for demolition and redevelopment into a new light industrial park, although there have been some protests that the buildings should be reused rather than being demolished. As part of the redevelopment of the site a project has been established by the Glastonbury Community Development Trust to provide support for local unemployed people applying for employment, starting in self-employment and accessing work-related training.

== Landmarks ==
According to the Glastonbury Conservation Area Appraisal of July 2010, there are approximately 170 listed buildings or structures in the town's designated conservation area, of which eight are listed grade I, six are listed grade II* and the remainder are listed grade II.

The Tribunal was a medieval merchant's house, used as the Abbey courthouse and, during the Monmouth Rebellion trials, by Judge Jeffreys. It now serves as a museum containing possessions and works of art from the Glastonbury Lake Village which were preserved in almost perfect condition in the peat after the village was abandoned. The museum is run by the Glastonbury Antiquarian Society. The building also houses the tourist information centre.

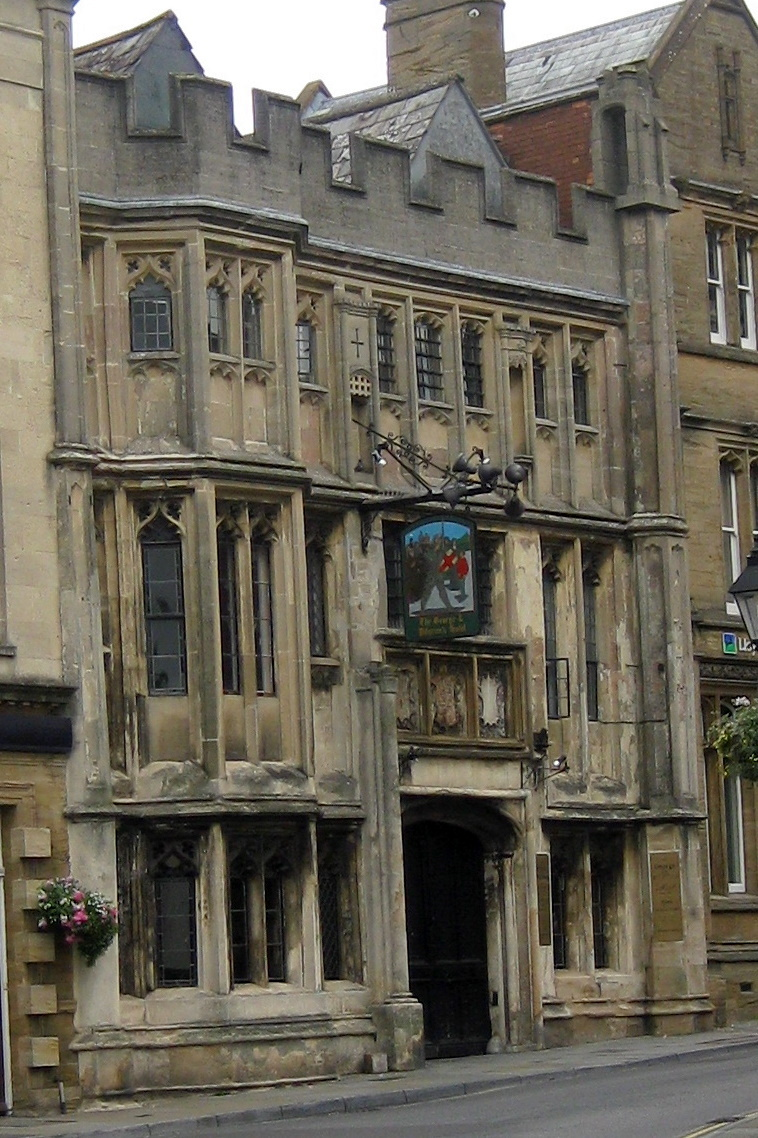
George Hotel and Pilgrims' Inn

The octagonal Market Cross was built in 1846 by Benjamin Ferrey.

The George Hotel and Pilgrims' Inn was built in the late 15th century to accommodate visitors to Glastonbury Abbey, which is open to visitors. It has been designated as a Grade I listed building. The front of the 3-storey building is divided into 3 tiers of panels with traceried heads. Above the right of centre entrance are 3 carved panels with arms of the Abbey and Edward IV.

The Somerset Rural Life Museum is a museum of the social and agricultural history of Somerset, housed in buildings surrounding a 14th-century barn once belonging to Glastonbury Abbey. It was used for the storage of arable produce, particularly wheat and rye, from the abbey's home farm of approximately 524 acres (2.12 km^{2}). Threshing and winnowing would also have been carried out in the barn, which was built from local shelly limestone with thick timbers supporting the stone tiling of the roof. It has been designated by English Heritage as a grade I listed building, and is a scheduled monument.

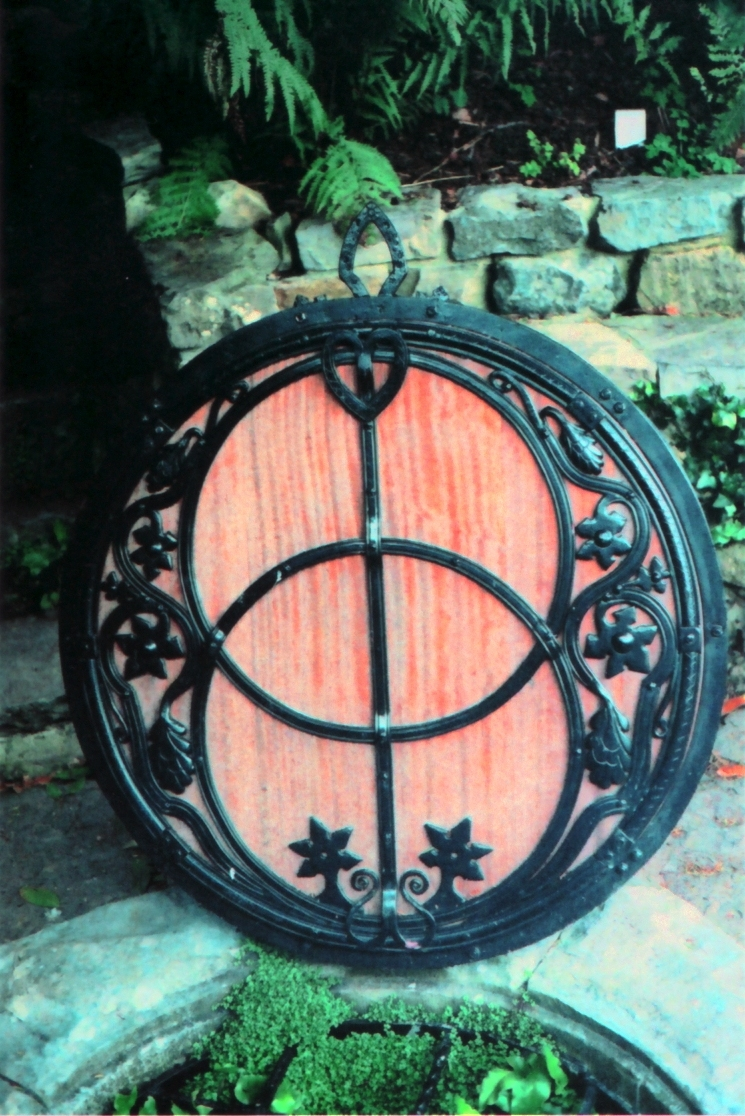
Cover of the Chalice Well

The Chalice Well is a holy well at the foot of the Tor, covered by a wooden well-cover with wrought-iron decoration made in 1919. The natural spring has been in almost constant use for at least two thousand years. Water issues from the spring at a rate of 25,000 imperial gallons (110,000 L; 30,000 US gal) per day and has never failed, even during drought. Iron oxide deposits give the water a reddish hue, as dissolved ferrous oxide becomes oxygenated at the surface and is precipitated, providing chalybeate waters. As with the hot springs in nearby Bath, the water is believed to possess healing qualities. The well is about 9 feet (2.7 m) deep, with two underground chambers at its bottom. It is often portrayed as a symbol of the female aspect of deity, with the male symbolised by Glastonbury Tor (however, some consider Glastonbury Tor to be a 'hugh bounteous female figure'). As such, it is a popular destination for pilgrims in search of the divine feminine, including modern Pagans. The well is however popular with all faiths and in 2001 became a World Peace Garden.

Just a short distance from the Chalice Well site, across a road known as Well House Lane, can be found the "White Spring", where a temple has been created in the 21st century. Whilst the waters of the Chalice Well are touched red with iron, the water of the latter is white with calcite. Some people consider the red water of Chalice Well to have male properties, whilst the white water of White Spring has female qualities. Both springs rise from caverns underneath the Tor and it is claimed that both have healing in their flow.

The building now used as the White Spring Temple was originally a Victorian-built well house, erected by the local water board in 1872. Around that time, an outbreak of cholera in the area caused great concern and the natural caves were dug out, and a stone collection chamber was constructed to ensure the flow of a quality water supply. Study of the flow of water into the collection chamber has shown that the builders also tapped into other springs, besides the White Spring and judging from the high iron content of one of these springs, it appears that a small offshoot of Chalice Well finds its way under Well House Lane to emerge beside the White Spring. However, after building the reservoir, the water board soon discovered that the high calciferous content of the water caused pipes to block and by the end of the 19th century water was piped into Glastonbury from out of town. After lying derelict for many years, the water board sold off the well house, which is now maintained by a group of volunteers as a "water temple". On the outside of the building is a tap where visitors and locals can collect the water of the White Spring.

== Transport ==
The Glastonbury Canal, opened 1834, ran just over 14 miles (23 km) through two locks from Glastonbury to Highbridge where it entered the Bristol Channel, but it became uneconomic with the arrival of the railway in the 1840s.

Glastonbury and Street railway station was the biggest station on the original Somerset & Dorset Joint Railway main line from Highbridge to Evercreech Junction until closed in 1966 under the Beeching axe. Opened in 1854 as Glastonbury, and renamed in 1886, it had three platforms, two for Evercreech to Highbridge services and one for the branch service to Wells. The station had a large goods yard controlled from a signal box. The site is now a timber yard for a local company. Replica level crossing gates have been placed at the entrance.

The nearest railway station is at Castle Cary but there is no direct bus route linking it to Glastonbury. There are convenient bus connections between Glastonbury and the railway stations at Bristol Temple Meads (over an hour travelling time) and at Taunton. It is also served by Berrys Coaches daily 'Superfast' service to and from London.

The main road in the town is the A39 which passes through Glastonbury from Wells connecting the town with Street and the M5 motorway. The other roads around the town are small and run across the levels generally following the drainage ditches. Local bus services are provided by Buses of Somerset (part of First), First West of England, Frome Bus & Libra Travel. The main routes are to Bristol via Wells, to Bridgwater, to Yeovil via Street and to Taunton. There is also a coach service to London Victoria provided by Berrys.

== Local media ==
Television programmes and local news is provided by BBC West and ITV West Country from the Mendip TV transmitter.

Local radio stations are BBC Radio Somerset on 95.5 FM, Heart West on 102.6 FM, Greatest Hits Radio South West on 102.4 FM, Worthy FM on 87.7 FM which broadcast during The Glastonbury Festival and GWS Radio on 107.1 FM, a community radio station.

The town's local newspapers are the Mid Somerset Series, Western Daily Press, Somerset County Gazette and Somerset Live.

== Education ==
There are several infant and primary schools in Glastonbury and the surrounding villages. Secondary education is provided by St Dunstan's School. In 2017, the school had 327 students between the ages of 11 and 16 years. It is named after St. Dunstan, an abbot of Glastonbury Abbey, who went on to become the Archbishop of Canterbury in 960 AD. The school was built in 1958 with major building work, at a cost of £1.2 million, in 1998, adding the science block and the sports hall. It was designated as a specialist Arts College in 2004, and the £800,000 spent at this time paid for the Performing Arts studio and facilities to support students with special educational needs. Tor School is a pupil referral unit based on Beckery New Road, which caters for 14-16-year-old students who have been excluded from mainstream education, or who have been referred for medical reasons.

Strode College in Street provides academic and vocational courses for those aged 16–18 and adult education. A tertiary institution and further education college, most of the courses it offers are A-levels or Business and Technology Education Councils (BTECs). The college also provides some university-level courses, and is part of The University of Plymouth Colleges network.

== Religious sites and faith groups ==
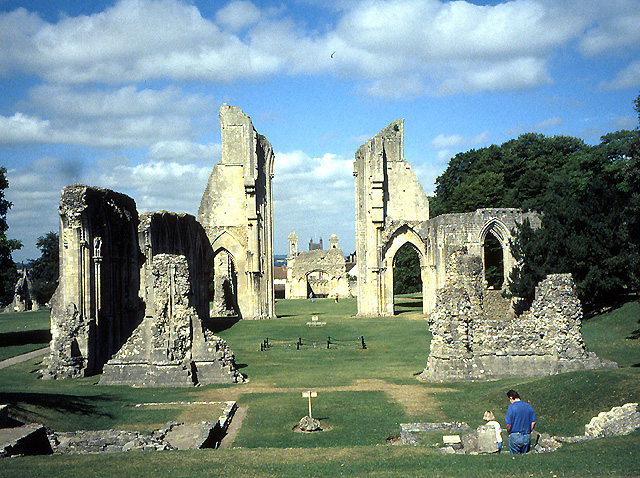
Ruins of Glastonbury Abbey

Glastonbury may have been a site of religious importance in pre-Christian times. The abbey was founded by Britons, and dates to at least the early 7th century, although later medieval Christian legend claimed that the abbey was founded by Joseph of Arimathea in the 1st century. This legend is intimately tied to Robert de Boron's version of the Holy Grail story and to Glastonbury's connection to King Arthur, which dates at least to the early 12th century. William of Malmesbury called this structure "the oldest church in England," and thenceforth it was known simply as the Old Church, inasmuch as it had existed for many years prior to the 7th century as a Celtic religious centre. In his "History of the English Church and People," written in the early eighth century, the Venerable Bede provides details regarding its construction to early missionaries. Glastonbury fell into Saxon hands after the Battle of Peonnum in 658. King Ine of Wessex enriched the endowment of the community of monks already established at Glastonbury. He is said to have directed that a stone church be built in 712. The Abbey Church was enlarged in the 10th century by the Abbot of Glastonbury, Saint Dunstan, the central figure in the 10th-century revival of English monastic life. He instituted the Benedictine Rule at Glastonbury and built new cloisters. Dunstan became Archbishop of Canterbury in 960. In 1184, a great fire at Glastonbury destroyed the monastic buildings. Reconstruction began almost immediately and the Lady Chapel, which includes the well, was consecrated in 1186.

The abbey had a violent end during the Dissolution and the buildings were progressively destroyed as their stones were removed for use in local building work. The remains of the Abbot's Kitchen (a grade I listed building.) and the Lady Chapel are particularly well-preserved set in 36 acres (150,000 m^{2}) of parkland. It is approached by the Abbey Gatehouse which was built in the mid-14th century and completely restored in 1810.

There is also a strong Irish connection to Glastonbury as it is said to be along a route of pilgrimage from Ireland to Rome. It is supposed that St. Patrick and St. Brigid both came to the area and both Saints are documented by William of Malmesbury as having done so. There are Chapels named after them too - St. Patrick's Chapel, Glastonbury is within the Abbey grounds and St. Brigid's Chapel is at Beckery (Little Ireland).

The Church of St Benedict was rebuilt by Abbot Richard Beere in about 1520. This is now an Anglican church and is linked with the parishes of St John's Church in Glastonbury and St Mary's & All Saints Church in the village of Meare as a joint benefice.

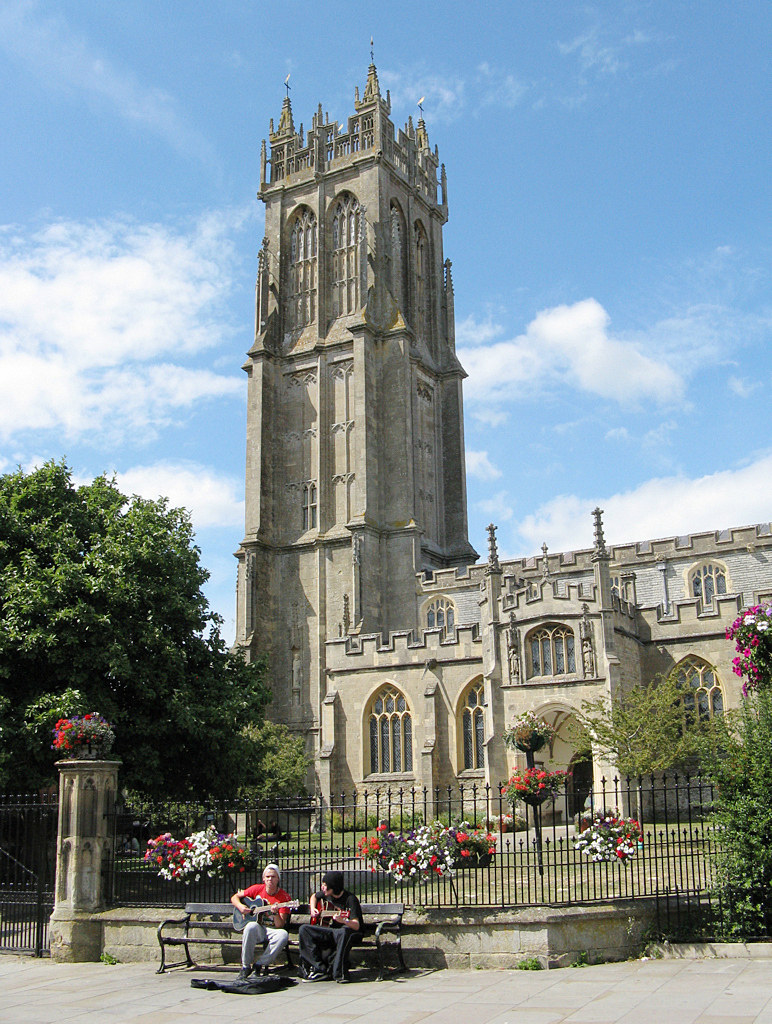
Church of St John the Baptist in the main street

Described as "one of the most ambitious parish churches in Somerset", the current Church of St John the Baptist dates from the 15th century and has been designated as a Grade I listed building. The church is laid out in a cruciform plan with an aisled nave and a clerestory of seven bays. The west tower has elaborate buttressing, panelling and battlements and at 134½ feet (about 41 metres), is the second tallest parish church tower in Somerset. Recent excavations in the nave have revealed the foundations of a large central tower, possibly of Saxon origin, and a later Norman nave arcade on the same plan as the existing one. A central tower survived until the 15th century, but is believed to have collapsed, at which time the church was rebuilt. The interior of the church includes four 15th-century tomb-chests, some 15th-century stained glass in the chancel, medieval vestments, and a domestic cupboard of about 1500 which was once at Witham Charterhouse.

In the centuries that followed the Reformation, many religious denominations came to Glastonbury to establish chapels and meeting houses. For such a small town, Glastonbury has a remarkably diverse history of Christian places of worship, further enriched by the fact that several of these movements saw break-away factions, typically setting up new meeting places as a result of doctrinal disagreements, leaving behind them a legacy which would require a highly specialized degree of study in order to chart their respective histories and places of practice. Amongst their number have been Puritans/Undetermined Protestants, Quakers, Independents, Baptists, Presbyterians, Congregationalists, Wesleyan and Primitive Methodists, Salvationists, Plymouth Brethren, Jehovah's Witnesses and Pentecostals.

The United Reformed Church on the High Street was built in 1814 and altered in 1898. It stands on the site of the Ship Inn where meetings were held during the 18th century. It is Grade II listed.

Glastonbury Methodist Church on Lambrook Street was built in 1843 and has a galleried interior, typical of a non-conformist chapel of that period, but an unusual number of stained glass windows. Close by the front of the church is an ancient pond, which was later covered to form a brick-arched reservoir. This is mentioned in property deeds of 1821, and is still accessible, containing approximately 31,500 gallons of water.

The Methodist Church on Lambrook street was originally the Glastonbury Wesleyan Methodist Chapel. A Primitive Methodist Chapel was built on Northload Street in 1844, with an adjoining house added for a minister in 1869. This chapel was closed in 1968, since which time it has had a number of different uses, being described in 2007 as the Maitreya Monastery, prior to which it had been the Archangel Michael Soul Therapy Centre.

The Bove Town Gospel Hall has been a place of worship in the town since at least 1889, when it was listed as a mission of the Plymouth Brethren. Jehovah's Witnesses originally occupied a Kingdom Hall on Archer's Way from 1942. This transferred to Church Lane in 1964, and subsequently to its present site on Old Wells Road. The Gospel Hall was registered for the solemnizing of marriages in 1964

The Catholic Church of Our Lady St Mary of Glastonbury was built, on land near to the Abbey, in 1939. A statue based on a 14th-century metal seal was blessed in 1955 and crowned in 1965 restoring the Marian shrine that had been in the Abbey prior to the reformation. The Shrine is now the home of the Community of Our Lady of Glastonbury, a Catholic Benedictine Monastery founded in August 2019.

The Glastonbury Order of Druids was formed on Mayday 1988.

Sufism has been long established in Glastonbury. Zikrs are held weekly in private homes, and on the first Sunday of every month a zikr is held at St Margaret's Chapel in Magdalene Street. A Sufi charity shop was established in Glastonbury in 1999, and supports missionary work in Africa. This shop was opened after Sheikh Nazim came to Glastonbury to visit the Abbey. Here he declared, "This is the spiritual heart of England ... It is from here that the spiritual new age will begin and to here that Jesus will return".

The pagan Glastonbury Goddess Temple was founded in 2002 and registered as a place of worship the following year. It is self-described as the first temple of its kind to exist in Europe in over a thousand years.

In April 2012, it was reported by The Guardian newspaper that, according to the Pilgrim Reception Centre in the town, Glastonbury had around seventy different faith groups. Some of these groups attended a special ceremony to celebrate this diversity, held in the Chalice Well Gardens on 21 April of that year.

The 22nd Jagannatha Ratha-yatra Krishna Festival took place in Glastonbury on Sunday 4 October 2015. Devotees of the Krishna Consciousness movement travelled to the town from London, Bath, Bristol and elsewhere to join with locals in a procession and Kirtan.

Glastonbury also headquarters the British Orthodox Church which is independent Oriental Orthodox denomination since 2015

Glastonbury has a particular significance for members of the Baháʼí Faith in that Wellesley Tudor Pole, founder of the Chalice Well Trust, was one of the earliest and most prominent adherents of this faith in the United Kingdom.

== Sports ==
The local football team is Glastonbury F.C. They joined the Western Football League in 1919 and have won the Western Football League title three times in their history. The club are now playing in the Somerset County Football League.

Glastonbury Cricket Club previously competed in the West of England Premier League, one of the ECB Premier Leagues, the highest level of recreational cricket in England and Wales. The club plays at the Tor Leisure Ground, which used to stage Somerset County Cricket Club first-class fixtures.

The town is on the route of the Samaritans Way South West.

== Culture ==
In a 1904 novel by Charles Whistler entitled A Prince of Cornwall Glastonbury in the days of Ine of Wessex is portrayed. It is also a setting in the Warlord Chronicles, a trilogy of books about Arthurian Britain written by Bernard Cornwell. Modern fiction has also used Glastonbury as a setting including The Age of Misrule series of books by Mark Chadbourn in which the Watchmen appear, a group selected from Anglican priests in and around Glastonbury to safeguard knowledge of a gate to the Otherworld on top of Glastonbury Tor. John Cowper Powys's novel A Glastonbury Romance is set in Glastonbury and is concerned with the Grail. The historical mystery novel Grave Goods by Diana Norman (writing under the pen name Ariana Franklin) is set in Glastonbury just after the abbey fire and concerns the supposed graves of Arthur and Guinevere, as well as featuring other landmarks such as the Tor.

The Children's World charity grew out of the festival and is based in the town. It is known internationally (as Children's World International). It was set up by Arabella Churchill in 1981 to provide drama participation and creative play and to work creatively in educational settings, providing social and emotional benefits for all children, particularly those with special needs. Children's World International is the sister charity of Children's World and was started in 1999 to work with children in the Balkans, in conjunction with Balkan Sunflowers and Save the Children. They also run the Glastonbury Children's Festival each August.

Glastonbury Assembly Rooms is a small venue for music and the arts, which was built in 1864 near the Glastonbury Abbey Wall. The Assembly Rooms was the centre of the original Glastonbury Musical Festival which ran from 1914 to 1925 and was a forerunner of the present day Glastonbury Festival. For years, the building continued to be a centre of local culture but fell into disuse after World War Two and would almost have been demolished. However, thanks to renewed public interest in the 1970s the Assembly Rooms became again a centre of the arts.

The local Brass Band is Glastonbury Brass. The band was founded in 2017 when the old Yeovil Town Band relocated after running into financial difficulty following a "notice to quit" on its rehearsal facility in September 2016. The band is featured twice on the Haiku Salut album There Is No Elsewhere (2018) and can be heard on the tracks "Cold To Crack The Stones" and "The More And Moreness." In February 2020, the band was involved in the launch of Johnny Mars's "Dare to Dream" project aimed at raising awareness of the effects mankind is having on the world.

Glastonbury is the final venue for the annual November West Country Carnival.

=== Hippie culture ===
Glastonbury has been described as a New Age community where communities have grown up to include people with New Age beliefs.

=== Glastonbury Festival ===
The first Glastonbury Festivals were a series of cultural events held in summer, from 1914 to 1926. The festivals were founded by English socialist composer Rutland Boughton and his librettist Lawrence Buckley. Apart from the founding of a national theatre, they envisaged a summer school and music festival based on utopian principles. With strong Arthurian connections and historic and prehistoric associations, Glastonbury was chosen to host the festivals.

The more recent Glastonbury Festival of Performing Arts, founded in 1970, is now the largest open-air music and performing arts festival in the world. Although it is named after Glastonbury, it is actually held at Worthy Farm between the small villages of Pilton and Pylle, 6 miles (9.7 km) east of the town of Glastonbury. The festival is best known for its contemporary music, but also features dance, comedy, theatre, circus, cabaret and many other arts. For 2005, the enclosed area of the festival was over 900 acres (3.6 km^{2}), had over 385 live performances and was attended by around 150,000 people. In 2007, over 700 acts played on over 80 stages and the capacity expanded by 20,000 to 177,000. The festival has spawned a range of other work including the 1972 film Glastonbury Fayre and album, 1996 film Glastonbury the Movie and the 2005 DVD Glastonbury Anthems.

=== Glastonbury Extravaganza ===
This is an annual music event that has been held in the grounds of Glastonbury Abbey since 1996. The event is held as a thank you to local people from Glastonbury Festival organiser Michael Eavis.

== Notable people ==
Glastonbury has been the birthplace or home to many notable people. Peter King, 1st Baron King was the recorder of Glastonbury in 1705. Thomas Bramwell Welch the discoverer of the pasteurisation process to prevent the fermentation of grape juice was born in Glastonbury in 1825. The judge John Creighton represented Lunenburg County in the Nova Scotia House of Assembly from 1770 to 1775. The fossil collector Thomas Hawkins lived in the town during the 19th century.

The religious connections and mythology of the town have also attracted notable authors. The occultist and writer Dion Fortune (Violet Mary Firth) lived and is buried in Glastonbury. Her old house was home to the writer and historian Geoffrey Ashe, who was known for his works on local legends. Frederick Bligh Bond, archaeologist and writer. Eckhart Tolle, a German-born writer, public speaker, and spiritual teacher lived in Glastonbury during the 1980s. Eileen Caddy was at a sanctuary in Glastonbury when she first claimed to have heard the "voice of God" while meditating. Her subsequent instructions from the "voice" directed her to take on Sheena Govan as her spiritual teacher, and became a spiritual teacher and new age author, best known as one of the founders of the Findhorn Foundation community.

Popular entertainment and literature is also represented amongst the population. English composer Rutland Boughton moved from Birmingham to Glastonbury in 1911 and established the country's first national annual summer school of music. Gary Stringer, lead singer of rock band Reef, was a local along with other members of the band. The juggler Haggis McLeod and his late wife, Arabella Churchill, one of the founders of the Glastonbury Festival, lived in the town. The conductor Charles Hazlewood lives locally and hosts the "Play the Field" music festival on his farm nearby. Bill Bunbury moved on from Glastonbury to become a writer, radio broadcaster, and producer for the Australian Broadcasting Corporation.

Athletes and sports players from Glastonbury include cricketers Cyril Baily in 1880, George Burrough in 1907, and Eustace Bisgood in 1878. The footballer Peter Spiring was born in Glastonbury in 1950. 2025 Formula 1 World Champion Lando Norris grew up in Glastonbury.

== Twin towns ==
Glastonbury is twinned with:

- Bretenoux, France
- Patmos, Greece.
- Lalibela, Ethiopia

== Freedom of the Town ==
The following people and military units have received the Freedom of the Town of Glastonbury.

=== Individuals ===
- Michael Eavis: 3 May 2022. The founder of the world-famous Glastonbury Festival has been made a Freeman of Glastonbury. Born in 1935, the celebrated dairy farmer held his first Glastonbury Festival at Worthy Farm, Pilton in 1970. 52 years later, Mr. Eavis has been listed by Time magazine as one of the top 100 most influential people in the world.

== The Key of Avalon ==
This award was created in 2022 by the Glastonbury Town Council. The first recipient was Prem Rawat, international peace advocate and author, who spoke at the Glastonbury Festival in 1971.
