= Tor Leisure Ground, Glastonbury =

Cricket ground in Glastonbury, England

Coordinates: 51°08′36″N 2°43′23″W

Tor Leisure Ground
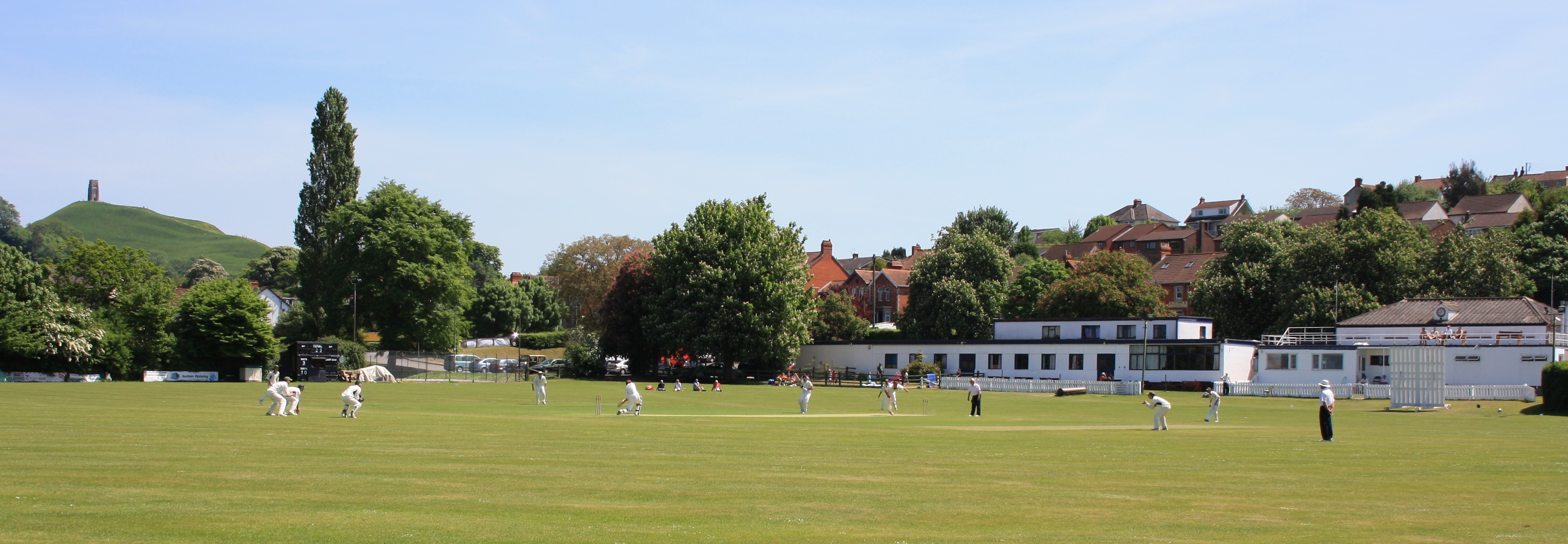

Ground information
- Location: Glastonbury, Somerset

Team information
Somerset	(1952 – 1994)
Glastonbury	(1893 – present)
- As of 18 January 2010; Source: CricketArchive

Tor Leisure Ground, previously known as Morlands Athletic Ground until 1986, is a former first-class cricket ground located in Glastonbury, Somerset. It hosted first-class matches for Somerset County Cricket Club between 1952 – 1973, and List A cricket between 1969 – 1978. It has been the home of Glastonbury Cricket Club since at least 1893, when the first recorded match was played on the ground. The highest individual first-class score made on the ground was 187* by Glamorgan's Alan Jones in a 1963 County Championship match.

The ground was formerly owned by the Morlands company, which was a major employer making sheepskin clothing in the town from 1870 to the mid-1980s.
