= Antonia Gransden =

English historian and medievalist (1928–2020)

- Photographed while at the University of Nottingham
- Born: Antonia Morland; 7 October 1928; Compton Dundon, Somerset, England
- Died: 18 January 2020 (aged 91); Keinton Mandeville, Somerset
- Spouse: K. W. Gransden (m. 1957; div. 1977)

Academic background
- Education: Dartington Hall; Somerville College, Oxford; University of London

Academic work
- Discipline: History
- Sub-discipline: Medieval history
- Institutions: British Museum; University of Nottingham
- Notable works: Historical Writing in England (1982)

Antonia Gransden (née Morland; 7 October 1928 – 18 January 2020), English historian and medievalist, was Reader in Medieval History at the University of Nottingham. She was author of works in medieval historiography, including the massive two-volume study Historical Writing in England, covering a thousand years of historical writing from the 6th to the 16th century.

Work at the British Museum fuelled Gransden's fascination with Bury St Edmunds Abbey. She went on to edit the records of the abbey, resulting in a two-volume History of the Abbey of Bury St Edmunds, which she completed aged 86.

== Life ==
Gransden was born Antonia Morland in Compton Dundon, Somerset. Her father was a director of Morlands clothing company in Glastonbury, Somerset. Educated at Dartington Hall and Somerville College, Oxford, she gained a first class degree and studied for a PhD, which she went on to earn from the University of London. She spent a decade as assistant keeper in the British Museum reading room from 1952, before joining Nottingham University as an assistant lecturer in 1964. She married Ken Gransden in 1957 and the couple had two daughters. However, the marriage was dissolved in 1977. She retired from Nottingham University in 1989.

Gransden was a long-standing member of the Labour Party, and an advocate for women's rights to education, equal pay and opportunities. She died from bronchopneumonia at a care home in Keinton Mandeville, Somerset, on 18 January 2020 at the age of 91. At the time of her death her "magisterial" two volumes on Historical Writing in England remained unsurpassed.

== Select bibliography ==
- A Critical Edition of the Bury St Edmunds Chronicle in Arundel MS 30 (College of Arms), London: University of London, 1956
- (ed.) The Letter-Book of William of Hoo, Sacrist of Bury St. Edmunds, 1280–1294, Publications, Vol. 5, Ipswich: Suffolk Records Society, 1963
- (ed. & trans.) The Chronicle of Bury St Edmunds 1212–1301, Nelson's Medieval Texts, London: Thomas Nelson & Sons, 1964
- (ed.) Customary of the Benedictine Abbey of Bury St Edmunds in Suffolk, Vol. 99, London: Henry Bradshaw Society, 1970.
- Historical Writing in England c. 550 to c. 1307, London: Routledge and Kegan Paul, 1974
- Historical Writing in England ii c. 1307 to the Early Sixteenth Century, Ithaca: Cornell University Press, 1982
- Legends, Traditions, and History in Medieval England, London: Hambledon Press, 1992
- A History of the Abbey of Bury St Edmunds, 1182–1256: Samson of Tottington to Edmund of Walpole, Studies in the History of Medieval Religion, vol. 31, Woodbridge: Boydell & Brewer, 2007, ISBN 9781843833246
- A History of the Abbey of Bury St Edmunds, 1257–1301: Simon of Luton and John of Northwold, Studies in the History of Medieval Religion, vol. 42, Woodbridge: Boydell & Brewer, 2015, ISBN 9781783270262
- (ed.) Bury St Edmunds: Medieval Art, Architecture, Archaeology, and Economy, Abingdon: Routledge, 2020, ISBN 978-1-351-57288-0
