= David Beal =

English cricketer

Personal information
- Full name: David Beal
- Born: 17 July 1966 (age 60); Butleigh, Somerset, England
- Batting: Right-handed
- Bowling: Right-arm medium
- Role: Bowler

Domestic team information
- Years: Team
- 1991: Somerset
- FC debut: 16 July 1991 Somerset v Sussex
- Last FC: 12 August 1991 Somerset v Sri Lankans
- LA debut: 21 April 1991 Somerset v Surrey
- Last LA: 25 August 1991 Somerset v Yorkshire

Career statistics
Competition	First-class	List A
Matches	3	6
Runs scored	1	1
Batting average	0.50	0.50
100s/50s	0/0	0/0
Top score	1	1
Balls bowled	426	156
Wickets	3	5
Bowling average	106.66	33.20
5 wickets in innings	0	0
10 wickets in match	0	0
Best bowling	1/37	2/40
Catches/stumpings	1/–	1/–
- Source: CricketArchive, 12 June 2011

David Beal (born 17 July 1966) played first-class and List A cricket for Somerset County Cricket Club in the 1991 season. He was born at Butleigh, Somerset.

Beal was a lower-order right-handed batsman and a right-arm medium-pace bowler who took a lot of wickets in club cricket for the Morlands Cricket Club at Glastonbury. He played three first-class matches and six one-day games for Somerset in 1991, having appeared for Somerset's second eleven since 1984. He made little impression in these matches, scoring just one run in both first-class and List A games, and achieving his best bowling in either form of cricket on his debut, in the List A match against Surrey at The Oval, when he took two wickets for 40 runs in his eight overs. He picked up a back injury in a mid-season one-day match against Middlesex and though he returned to the side late in the season, he did not play for any Somerset side after 1991.
