= Cyril Baily =

English cricketer

Personal information
- Full name: Cyril Baily
- Born: 17 July 1880; Glastonbury, England
- Died: 21 September 1924 (aged 44); Burnham-on-Sea, England
- Batting: Right-handed
- Role: Batsman

Domestic team information
- Years: Team
- 1902: Somerset
- Only FC: 24 July 1902 Somerset v Surrey

Career statistics
| Competition | First-class |
|---|---|
| Matches | 1 |
| Runs scored | 8 |
| Batting average | 8 |
| 100s/50s | 0/0 |
| Top score | 4* |
| Catches/stumpings | 2/– |
- Source: CricketArchive, 20 August 2008

Cyril Alexander Highett Baily (17 July 1880 – 21 September 1924) was an English amateur cricketer. He was a right-handed batsman who played for Glastonbury Cricket Club, and made one first-class appearance for Somerset, in 1902.

== Life and career ==
Baily was born in Glastonbury in Somerset on 17 July 1880, the son of Henry Shore Baily of The Elms in Glastonbury. He played club cricket as a batsman for Glastonbury Cricket Club, where he topped the club's batting averages in 1901. He made a single first-class appearance for Somerset, during the 1902 season, against Surrey. Playing as a tailender, he picked up four runs in both innings in which he batted, finishing not out in the second innings. He took two catches in the match and did not bowl. Baily continued to play for Glastonbury until at least 1913.

Baily joined the 3rd Volunteer Battalion of the Somerset Light Infantry as a second lieutenant in 1900, and the following year was promoted to lieutenant. He was promoted again in 1904, to captain, and by 1905 he commanded "C" (Glastonbury) company of the battalion. He married Dora Glass in Clifton in March 1905, at which time he helped run the family business, working as a book-keeper for Messrs A Baily and Co, at the Beckery Leather Factory in Glastonbury. Later in 1905, he resigned his command of "C" Company in the Somerset Light Infantry, and two months later he resigned his commission.

Baily died on 21 September 1924, at the age of 44, in Burnham-on-Sea, Somerset. He was survived by his mother, a brother (Horace Baily) and a sister (Mrs G. Ford Tilley).
