= Dry point =

Area of firm or flood-free ground

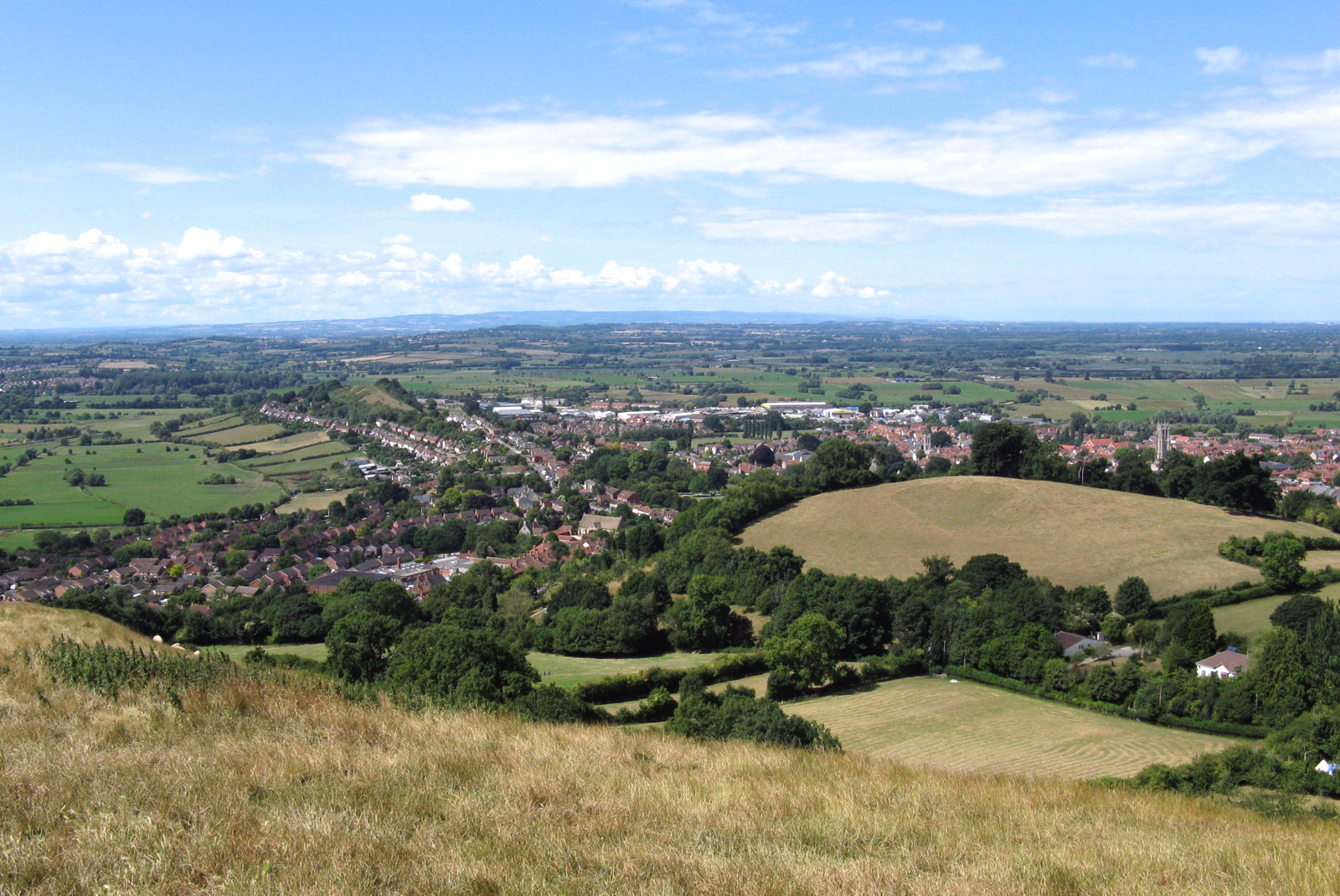
Glastonbury in Somerset, a dry point settlement, looking west from the top of Glastonbury Tor. The fields in the distance are the Somerset Levels, where winter flooding is frequent.

In geography, a dry point is an area of firm or flood-free ground in an area of wetland, marsh or flood plains. The term typically applies to settlements, and dry point settlements were common in history.

In the United Kingdom extreme examples of dry point settlements include Ely, situated on a small hill in the marshy Fens; Glastonbury, situated on a low hill in the marshy Somerset Levels; and Wareham surrounded by flood plains beside Poole Harbour.

A dry point has the advantages of flood protection, fertile soil (due to previous floodings which would have deposited silt on the land) and fairly flat land which is ideal for agriculture and building.
