= Bill Bunbury =

Writer and historian in Western Australia

William Hedley Richardson Bunbury OAM (born 7 October 1940), known as Bill Bunbury, is a British-born Australian broadcaster, producer, historian and writer. He spent much of his career with the Australian Broadcasting Corporation (ABC).

== Early life and education ==
Bunbury was born in Glastonbury, England, in 1940 to an Australian father and an English mother. He graduated with an honours degree from Durham University in 1963 and subsequently moved to his father's native Australia. He initially worked for two months on his cousin's farm in Broomehill before moving to Perth, where he taught English at Guildford Grammar School.

During a visit to the school by an ABC television crew, Bunbury met producer Roger Penny, who encouraged him to apply for a position with the broadcaster. He joined the ABC education department in May 1969.

== Career ==
Bunbury's first couple of years at the ABC consisted of radio work. He moved to television shortly afterwards to present a children's program called Here in the West. Later, while making a film series about significant communities, he came across the experience of Group Settlers in Denmark, Western Australia in the 1920s. Unable to get funds for a TV production he recorded a 30-minute radio documentary THEY SAID YOU'D OWN YOUR OWN FARM Its unexpected popularity prompted Bunbury to move full time to radio, travelling around Western Australia recording series called LIVING HISTORY.

In 1985, historian and broadcaster Tim Bowden founded the ABC's social history unit, and invited Bill to join the unit. He had already produced a Background Briefing on the death of John Pat in the Pilbara and then produced Hindsight, Verbatim, Street Stories and Encounter. He retired from the ABC in 2007. Bunbury said, "I wanted to go while I was still doing good work. I think I've quit while I was, hopefully, still winning races. I think maybe some [journalists] retire too early. Perhaps some go on [working] too long. You try to pick the right time."

He has subsequently worked with Community Arts WA, producing radio features which assist Aboriginal communities to tell their own stories and has also presented VoicePrints for the Perth International Arts Festival' Bunbury's documentary series covered such topics as Cyclone Tracy, Australia's involvement in the Vietnam War, and the granting of equal wages to Aboriginal stockmen in 1966. His work had a strong focus on Indigenous Australian history. Bunbury won several awards for his radio programmes and series, including the NSW Premier's Media Prize in 1996 for his six part series UNFINISHED BUSINESS,- RECONCILIATION & THE REPUBLIC, the New York Radio Festival Gold medal for Best History Documentary, "Timber for Gold", Gold Mining and Timber ] in Kalgoorlie, and the UN Australia Peace Prize for "The War Rages On", Australians in Vietnam.

His interest in oral history and recording of people's memories has created a vast resource in the Western Australian state library, Battye Library, of recorded interviews with people from various documentaries and programmes. Journalist Andre Malan has described this as Bunbury's legacy, "a priceless archive of the State's rich oral history that would otherwise have been lost forever".

Bunbury has published extensively with Fremantle Press and UWA Publishing, and is currently adjunct professor of History and Media at Murdoch University where he was also awarded an Honorary Doctorate in Literature in 2008 for services to broadcasting and history.

In 2017 Bill Bunbury was awarded an Order of Australia for his services to broadcasting and Aboriginal communities.

== Personal life ==
Bunbury and his wife Jenny live in Margaret River. They have two daughters and two grandsons.

On Australia Day 2017, Bunbury was awarded the Medal of the Order of Australia (OAM) for "service to the broadcast media, and to the Indigenous community of Western Australia".

== Selected publications ==
- Bowden, Ros; Bunbury, Bill (1990). Being Aboriginal: Comments, Observations and Stories from Aboriginal Australians (1st ed.). Crows Nest, New South Wales: ABC. ISBN 9780733300233.
- Bunbury, Bill (1993). Rag, Sticks & Wire: Australians Taking to the Air (1st ed.). Sydney: ABC Books. ISBN 9780733302732.
- ——— (1995). Rabbits & Spaghetti: Captives and Comrades, Australians, Italians and the War, 1939–1945. Fremantle, Western Australia: Fremantle Arts Centre Press. ISBN 9781863681223.
- ——— (1998). Unfinished Business: Reconciliation, the Republic and the Constitution. Sydney: ABC Books. ISBN 9780733306501.
- ——— (2002). It's Not the Money It's the Land: Aboriginal Stockmen and the Equal Wages Case. North Fremantle, Western Australia: Fremantle Arts Centre Press. ISBN 9781863683661.
- ——— (2006). Caught in Time: Talking Australian History. Fremantle, Western Australia: Fremantle Arts Centre Press. ISBN 9781921064845.
- ——— (2015). Invisible Country: South-West Australia: Understanding a Landscape. Crawley, Western Australia: UWA Publishing. ISBN 9781742586250.
- ———; Bunbury, Jenny (2020). Many Maps: Charting Two Cultures: First Nations and Europeans in Western Australia. Crawley, Western Australia: UWA Publishing. ISBN 9781760801410.
- Bunbury, Jenny; Bunbury, Bill (2024). Settlement, Struggle and Success: Margaret River and its Old Hospital, 1924–2024. Crawley, Western Australia: UWA Publishing. ISBN 9781760802769.
