= Glastonbury (film) =

- Film poster
- Directed by: Julien Temple
- Produced by: Robert Richards
- Cinematography: Terry Flaxton; Ben Smithard; Julien Temple
- Edited by: Niven Howie; Tobias Zaldua
- Production companies: BBC Films; HanWay Films; EMAP Performance; Newhouse Nitrate
- Distributed by: Pathé Distribution
- Release date: 14 April 2006
- Running time: 135 minutes
- Country: United Kingdom
- Language: English
- Box office: $202,041

Glastonbury is a 2006 rockumentary film directed by Julien Temple which details the history of the Glastonbury Festival from 1970 to 2005. It is the third attempt to make a film about the festival. The film is made up of footage shot by Temple at the festival in 2002, 2003, 2004 and 2005 as well as footage sent in by festival goers after a request on websites and newspapers for footage. Temple had initially only agreed to make a film of the 2002 festival after organiser Michael Eavis expressed concern that that would be the last year of the festival. Temple then realised that he wanted to make a film detailing the full history of the festival. The film also includes footage shot by Channel 4 and the BBC during their coverage of the festival since 1994.

A series of special charity premieres took place on 13 April 2006 which included live performances from bands such as The Levellers. The DVD has a fully interactive feature which allows viewers to make their own festival experience by selecting which live footage they would prefer to see in the film. The DVD was released on 17 July 2006 after a showing on BBC Two on 15 July 2006.

Footage for a re-evaluated edition of the film (to be shown on the BBC in 2012) was filmed in the summer of 2011 by Temple (in association with Somerset Film).

The DVD was authored by The Pavement.

== Reception ==
On the review aggregator website Rotten Tomatoes, 73% of 33 critics' reviews are positive. The website's consensus reads: "Glastonbury is formless and scattershot, and successful in capturing the festival's raw, wild energy." Metacritic, which uses a weighted average, assigned the film a score of 60 out of 100, based on 13 critics, indicating "mixed or average" reviews.

== See also ==
- Glastonbury Fayre (film)
- Glastonbury the Movie
- Glastonbury Anthems
