= Glastonbury Cricket Club =

Coordinates: 51°08′40″N 2°43′23″W

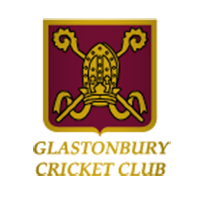
- Nickname: The Thorns

Personnel
- Captain: Matt Shawcross

Team information
- Colors: Maroon White
- Founded: 1986
- Home ground: Tor Leisure Ground, Glastonbury
- Official website: glastonbury.play-cricket.com

Glastonbury Cricket Club is an English amateur cricket club based in Glastonbury, Somerset. The club's first team plays in the West of England Premier League which is an accredited ECB Premier League, the highest level for recreational club cricket in England and Wales.

== History ==
The first record of a cricket club representing Glastonbury is from 1893, when they played host to Weston-super-Mare at the Morlands Athletic Ground, Glastonbury. The home team won by seven wickets with a match-winning performance by 'R Laver', who claimed six Weston-super-Mare wickets, and then top-scored for Glastonbury in their reply with 54. Laver continued to star for Glastonbury in the three recorded matches from 1894, taking seven wickets against Wells, six against Yeovil, and five against Bridgwater. He claimed five wickets again in 1899, their next recorded match, against Wincanton.

In 1986, the Morlands Athletic Ground was renamed the Tor Leisure Ground. Glastonbury played in the Somerset League from at least 1990 until 2002, when they were divisional champions, earning promotion to the Bristol & Somerset Division. They won this division at the first attempt in 2003. Despite finishing with fewer points than Midsomer Norton, they had a higher average number of points due to having one more match cancelled. Playing in Premier Two in 2004, Glastonbury finished top of their league for the third successive season, gaining promotion to the West of England Premier League Premier One division.

== Honours ==
- West of England Premier League - Premier One
  - Runners-Up: 2005, 2008
- West of England Premier League — Premier Two
  - Champions: 2004
- West of England Premier League — Bristol & Somerset Division
  - Champions: 2003
- West of England Premier League — Somerset Division
  - Champions: 2002
- Somerset Major Cup
  - Champions: 2006, 2007, 2013
  - Runners-Up: 2008, 2009

== Players ==
=== Current squad ===
| No. | Name | Nationality | Birth date | Batting style | Bowling style | Notes |
Batsmen
| 24 | Matt Shawcross | England | 26 September 1994 (age 31) | Right-handed | Right-arm Off Spin | |
| 2 | Josh Beal | England | 18 June 1991 (age 34) | Right-handed | Right-arm Medium pace | |
| 17 | John Stratton | England | 30 November 1995 (age 30) | Right-handed | Right-arm Medium pace | |
| 4 | Will Mason | England | 28 March 1995 (age 30) | Right-handed | Right-arm Leg Spin | |
| 5 | Harry Ellison | England | 22 March 1993 (age 32) | Right-handed | Right-arm Medium pace | |
| 49 | Jack Lukins | England | 21 October 1996 (age 29) | Right-handed | Right-arm Off Spin | |
All-rounders
| 8 | Alfie Barron | England | 22 July 1995 (age 30) | Right-handed | Left-arm Off Spin | |
| 9 | Chris Herbert | Australia | 16 February 1991 (age 35) | Right-handed | Right-arm Leg Spin | Overseas |
| 10 | Ali Easton | England | 22 July 1995 (age 30) | Right-handed | Right-arm Off Spin | Captain |
| 11 | Archie Dunning | England | 4 November 1997 (age 28) | Right-handed | Right-arm Fast bowling | |
| 23 | Joe Mason | England | 3 January 1994 (age 32) | Right-handed | Right-arm Medium pace | |
Wicket-keepers
| 63 | Callum Hotham | Australia | 16 February 1991 (age 35) | Right-handed | | Overseas |
| 13 | Ben Mason | England | 7 October 1996 (age 29) | Right-handed | – | |
| 14 | Ian Odam | England | 14 January 1972 (age 54) | Right-handed | – | |
| 15 | Herbert Rumney | England | 27 August 1996 (age 29) | Right-handed | – | |
Bowlers
| 86 | Stephen Keates | South Africa | 20 March 1986 (age 39) | Right-handed | Right-arm Fast bowling | Club Captain |
| 10 | Dan Williams | England | 18 October 1994 (age 31) | Right-handed | Right-arm Fast bowling | Vice Captain |

=== List of professional former players ===
Jos Buttler (Lancashire)
Craig Kieswetter (Somerset)
Rory Hamilton-Brown (Sussex)
Ben Duckett (Northamptonshire)
Wes Durston (Derbyshire)
James Hildreth (Somerset)
Cameron Steel (Middlesex)
Gareth Andrews (Worcestershire)

== Records & Statistics ==
=== Team records ===
- Played: 312
- Wins: 176
- Loses: 106
- No Result/Abandoned: 30

=== Batting ===
- Most runs: 4,485 – Wes Durston
- Best average: 54.04 – Wes Durston
- Highest individual score: 214 – Wes Durston
- Most fifties: 21 – Wes Durston
- Most centuries: 13 – Wes Durston

=== Bowling ===
- Most wickets: 266 – Robert Travers
- Best average: 9.13 – Christopher Slocombe
- Best bowling: 8/71 – Andrew Barron
- Best strike rate: 18.34 – Wes Durston
- Best economy rate: 2.54 – David Beal

=== Fielding ===
- Most catches (Outfield): 77 – Steven Spencer
- Most catches(Wicket-Keeping): 57 – Justin Lisk
- Most stumpings: 25 – Justin Lisk
- Most run outs: 12 – Steven Spencer

All statistics & records as of 23 March 2014.

== Club officials ==
=== Committee ===
- Patron: Joel Garner
- Chairman: Heather Hall
- Honorary Treasurer: Stephanie Berry
- Honorary Secretary: Gabrielle Owen
- Advisor: Steve Dickens
- Club Captain: Stephen Keates
- Head Groundsman: Keith Tooze & Bob Taylor

=== Coaching staff ===
- Director of Cricket: David Beal
- 1st team coach: Andy Gibbens
- 1st team captain: Matt Shawcross
- 2nd team captain: Chris Herbert
- 3rd team captain: Ian Odam
- Under 15s team manager: David Beal
- Under 13s team manager: David Gooch
- Under 11s A team manager: Zoe Smeed
- Under 11s B team manager: Jerry Dalton
