= New Age communities =

Beliefs in a certain group of people

New Age communities are places where, intentionally or accidentally, communities have grown up to include significant numbers of people with New Age beliefs. An intentional community may have specific aims but are varied and have a variety of structures, purposes and means of subsistence. These include authoritarian, democratic and consensual systems of internal government. New Age communities also exist on the Internet.

== Notable communities ==
=== Australia ===
- Byron Bay
- The Family

=== Europe ===
- Glastonbury – is particularly notable for the myths and legends surrounding a nearby hill, Glastonbury Tor, which rises up from the otherwise flat landscape of the Somerset Levels. These myths concern Joseph of Arimathea and the Holy Grail, and also King Arthur. Glastonbury is also said to be the centre of several ley lines.
- Totnes – known as "Britain's alternative capital. A New Age nirvana of Sufis, surfers and Buddhist builders ..."

=== United States ===
- Esalen Institute – a center in Big Sur for humanistic alternative education and a nonprofit organization devoted to multidisciplinary studies ordinarily neglected or unfavoured by traditional academia
- Harbin Hot Springs
- Lily Dale Spiritualist Assembly
- Lindisfarne Association
- Living Enrichment Center
- Love Has Won
- Maharishi International University

== Charismatic leadership ==
Such communities may be founded by charismatic leaders who may be credited with quasi-religious status, being considered gurus or messiahs. Such leaders inhibit the survival of these communities.
