= Robert Travers (cricketer) =

English cricketer

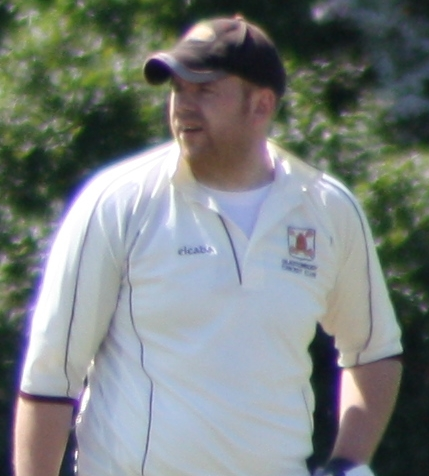

Personal information
- Full name: Robert Christopher Travers
- Born: 18 March 1982 (age 44); Taunton, Somerset, England
- Batting: Right-handed
- Bowling: Right-arm off break

Domestic team information
- Years: Team
- 2000–2002: Somerset Cricket Board
- 2008: Wiltshire
- Only LA: 13 September 2001 Somerset Cricket Board v Norfolk

Career statistics
| Competition | List A |
|---|---|
| Matches | 1 |
| Runs scored | – |
| Batting average | – |
| 100s/50s | – |
| Top score | – |
| Balls bowled | 42 |
| Wickets | 2 |
| Bowling average | 13.00 |
| 5 wickets in innings | 0 |
| 10 wickets in match | 0 |
| Best bowling | 2/26 |
| Catches/stumpings | 0/– |
- Source: CricketArchive, 22 May 2010

Robert Christopher Travers (born 18 March 1982) is an English cricketer who made a single List A appearance for Somerset Cricket Board in 2001. He has played for Glastonbury Cricket Club, captaining the side at times. He is a right-arm off break bowler, and lower-order right-handed batsman.

== Cricket career ==
=== County level ===
In his only major appearance, a List A match for Somerset Cricket Board in the second round of the 2002 Cheltenham & Gloucester Trophy, Travers claimed two wickets off his seven overs. He wasn't required to bat as the Somerset side lost due to having a slower run rate in a match abandoned due to rain. He made two other appearances for Somerset Cricket Board, in the 2000 and 2002 ECB 38-County Cup competitions. In 2000, against Gloucestershire Cricket Board, he bowled four wicket-less overs, conceding 23 runs, and in 2002 against Wiltshire, he bowled two wicket-less overs conceding 10 runs.

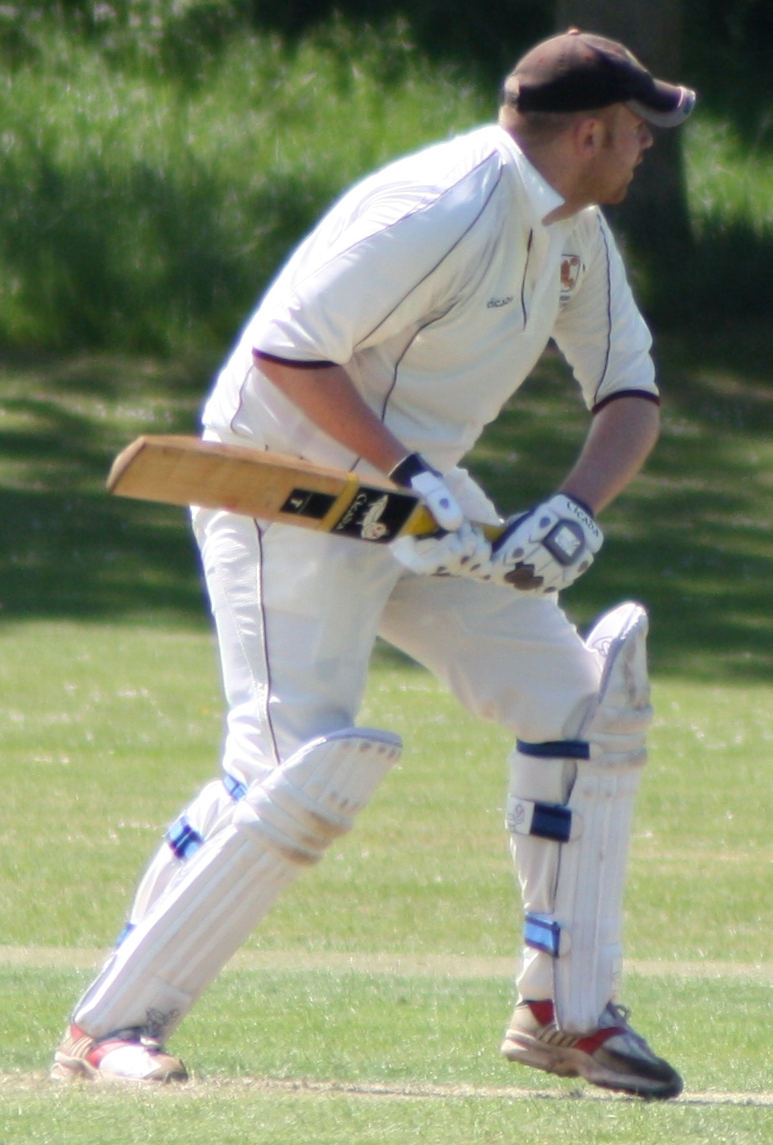
Travers batting for Glastonbury against Taunton Deane in 2010

Travers represented Wiltshire for five Minor Counties Championship and four Minor Counties Trophy matches in 2008. On his debut for the county against Cornwall he claimed 1/22 off five overs in a Trophy match. He claimed one further wicket in his next three Trophy matches. He went wicket-less in his first Championship match, but claimed two wickets in the first-innings of his next match, albeit conceding 111 runs off his 24 overs. He was used heavily again in the second-innings, bowling 40 of the 98 overs, finishing with figures of 1/143. He best return was in his fourth match, against Dorset, when took three wickets for 45 runs in his 13 overs.

=== Club level ===
Travers first played for Street Cricket Club before moving to local rivals Glastonbury Cricket Club, first appearing for them in 2001. He claimed his first five-wicket haul in the West of England Premier League (WEPL) in 2006, in a match against Keynsham, returning figures of 5/28 off 16 overs. He achieved the feat again the following season against Frocester, although his bowling proved more expensive on this occasion, as he conceded 68 runs while taking five wickets. After captaining the side for three matches at the end of 2008, Travers took over the first-team captaincy permanently from the start of the 2009 season. He achieved his best bowling figures in the WEPL during his first year of captaincy, when he claimed 6/66 against Weston-super-Mare. Later in the same season, he claimed 5/9 in seven overs as Glastonbury beat Downend by 171 runs.

In 2018, Travers joined Shapwick & Polden CC after a five-year break from the game, playing his first match for their 2nd XI against his former club Street CC.
