= Somerset Film =

- Type: Film, Production, Television, Corporate, Community & Online
- Country: United Kingdom
- Launch date: 1997
- Official website: http://www.somersetfilm.com

Somerset Film is a film production and training social enterprise based at the Engine Room community media centre in the town of Bridgwater, Somerset in the United Kingdom.

Somerset Film teaches skills in film and media, often working with isolated and disadvantaged sections of the community. Through the community based projects they provide training, mentoring and employment in the local media sector.

They work in all areas of film production, from generating and developing ideas to a full range of post production services. They mainly work in documentary, community based projects and corporate films for a variety of clients around the UK.

They opened their Engine Room Bridgwater base in 2003 and have been actively involved in professional production ever since as well as encouraging community access to those seeking technical assistance with filmmaking, using computers and creative software. They regularly run courses for the general public to learn how to use programmes such as Adobe Photoshop, Final Cut Pro and After Effects.

The company and the films they have helped produce have won multiple awards at First Light, Picture This (Canada) and Oska Bright and other national and international Film Festivals as well as Campaign for Learning, UK Online Centre Community Media Beacon 2009, EBP Somerset Education Business Award 2008 (with Penrose School) and Somerset Linx Education Business Award 2007.

Film director Julien Temple is one of the patrons of The Engine Room. His 2006 film Glastonbury and his 2007 rockumentary Joe Strummer - The Future Is Unwritten were both made with Somerset Film producers and crews involved. Other media companies that have worked with and for Somerset Film include Film Tank and Biggerhouse Productions.

Somerset Film is an Arts Council National Portfolio Organisation (confirmed until March 2018).
