= St Dunstan's School, Glastonbury =

St Dunstan's School
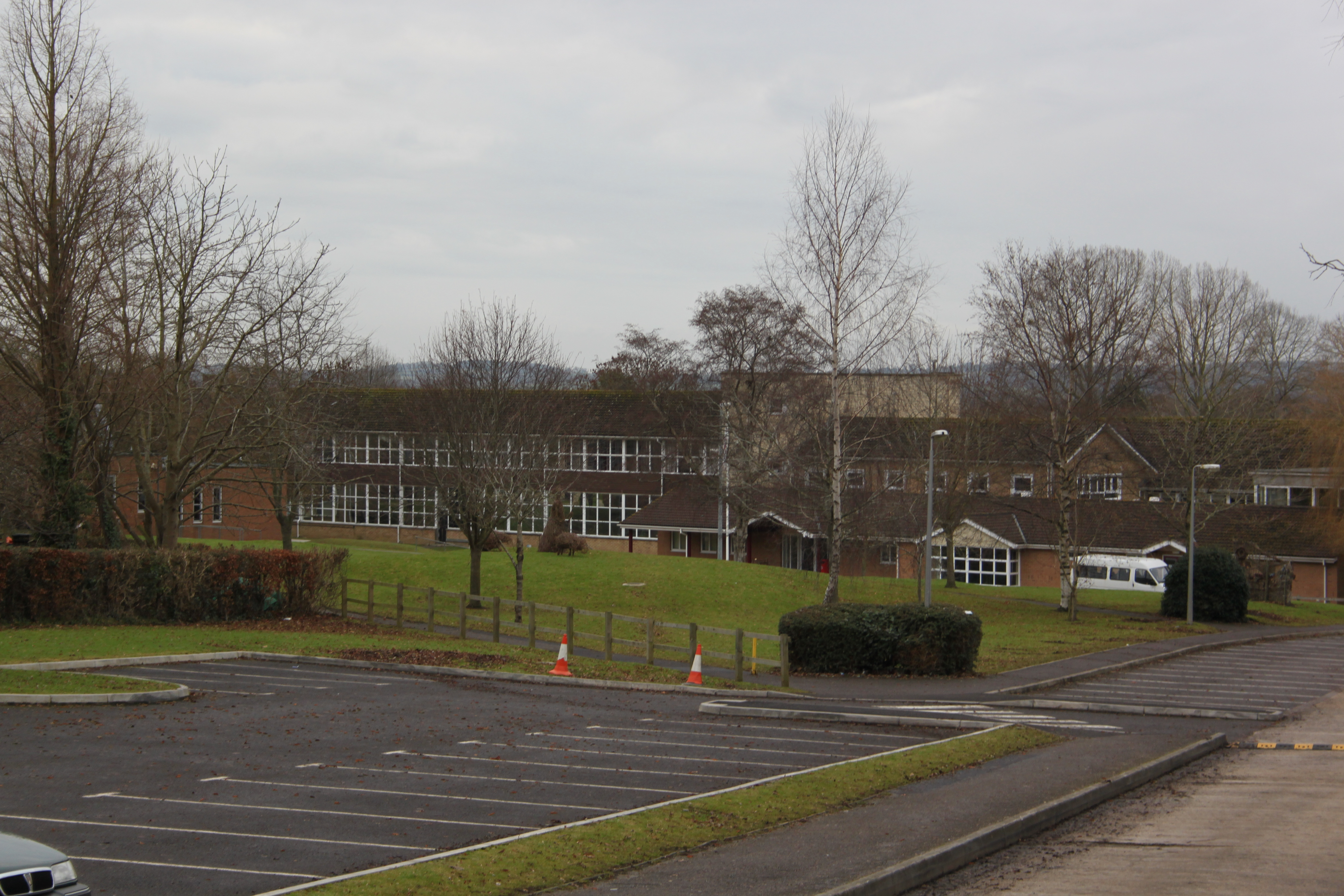

Location
- Wells Road; Glastonbury, Somerset, BA6 9BY; England; 51.1525°N 2.7145°W

Information
- Type: Academy
- Founder: Elliott L
- Department for Education URN: 137202 Tables
- Ofsted: Reports
- Head teacher: Lynda Bevan
- Gender: Mixed
- Age: 11 to 16
- Enrolment: 327 pupils
- Website: http://www.stdunstansschool.com

St Dunstan's School is a secondary school in Glastonbury, Somerset, England. The school is for students between the ages of 11 and 16 years. It is named after St. Dunstan, an abbot of Glastonbury Abbey, who went on to become Archbishop of Canterbury in 960AD.

The school was a 'new-build' in 1958 with major building work, at a cost of £1.2 million, in 1998, adding the science block and the sports hall. It was designated as a specialist Arts College in 2004 and the £800,000 spent at this time paid for the Performing Arts studio and facilities to support pupils with special educational needs. In 2011, the school became an academy.
