= Peter Scupham =

British poet (1933–2022)

John Peter Scupham (24 February 1933 – 11 June 2022) was a British poet.

== Early life and education ==
John Peter Scupham was born in Bootle, Lancashire, England on 24 February 1933, to John and Dorothy Scupham. The family moved to Cambridgeshire and he was educated at the Perse School, Cambridge, and St George's School, Harpenden. After National Service with the RAOC, he studied at Emmanuel College, Cambridge.

== Career ==
Scupham taught at Skegness Grammar School, and then became head of English at St. Christopher School, Letchworth. His first marriage was to Carola Nance Braunholtz, a classics teacher, with whom he had four children. His second wife was Margaret Steward. Together they restored a small derelict Elizabethan Manor house in Norfolk, where they put on plays and created a garden. Simon Jenkins included the house in England's Thousand Best Homes.

=== Theatre ===
Scupham and Steward started a theatrical company, Phoebus Car. Some of its members went on to careers on the stage.

=== Small press ===
With John Mole he founded The Mandeville Press, a small press using traditional letterpress methods of printing. The Press produced hand-set editions of work by Geoffrey Grigson, Anthony Hecht, John Fuller, K. W. Gransden, and many others. Its archive is now in the British Library.

=== Bookselling ===
For many years he ran an antiquarian book business - Mermaid Books - with Steward, specialising in English Literature, and trading by printed catalogue. The Times described the "witty and erudite catalogues that became collection pieces in themselves". From 2020 onwards, Mermaid Books appeared to be in hiatus, and is now no longer trading.

== Death ==
Scupham was able to see proofs of his final volume shortly before his death. He died from kidney failure in South Burlingham, Norfolk, on 11 June 2022, at the age of 89.

== Awards and honours ==
- 1990 Elected Fellow of the Royal Society of Literature
- 1996 Cholmondeley Award
- 2009 A portrait of Scupham by photographer Jemimah Kuhfeld was acquired by the National Portrait Gallery, London for its permanent collection.

== Works ==
- Invitation to View. Manchester: Carcanet Press, Limited. 2022. ISBN 978-1-80017-210-4.
- Borrowed Landscapes. Manchester: Carcanet Press, Limited. 2011. ISBN 978-1-84777-080-6.
- Collected Poems. Manchester: Carcanet Press, Limited. 2003. ISBN 978-1-903039-57-1.
- Night Watch. Anvil Press Poetry. 1999. ISBN 978-0-85646-319-8.
- The Ark. Oxford University Press. 1994. ISBN 978-0-19-282337-3.
- Selected Poems, 1972-1990. Oxford University Press. 1990. ISBN 978-0-19-282762-3.
- Watching the Perseids. Oxford University Press. 1990. ISBN 978-0-19-282785-2.
- Air Show. Oxford University Press. 1988. ISBN 978-0-19-282206-2.
- Out Late. Oxford University Press. 1986. ISBN 978-0-19-281973-4.
- Winter Quarters. Oxford University Press. 1983. ISBN 978-0-19-211957-5.
- Summer Palaces. Oxford University Press. 1980. ISBN 978-0-19-211932-2.
- The Hinterland. Oxford University Press. 1977. ISBN 978-0-19-211871-4.
- Prehistories. Oxford University Press. 1975. ISBN 9780192118462.
- The Snowing Globe. Manchester: E. J. Morten. 1972. ISBN 978-0-901598-42-4.

=== Editor ===
- Ovid (2005). Peter Scupham (ed.). Ovid's Metamorphoses: a selection. Translator Arthur Golding. Manchester: Carcanet Press. ISBN 978-1-85754-776-4.

=== Anthologies ===
- Jay Parini, ed. (2005). "Guard-Room". The Wadsworth anthology of poetry. Cengage Learning. ISBN 978-1-4130-0473-1.
- David Constantine; Hermione Lee; Bernard O'Donoghue, eds. (2001). Oxford poets 2001: an anthology. Carcanet. ISBN 978-1-903039-52-6.
