= Hospital of St Mary Magdalene, Glastonbury =

Building in Glastonbury, Somerset, England

Hospital of St Mary Magdalene
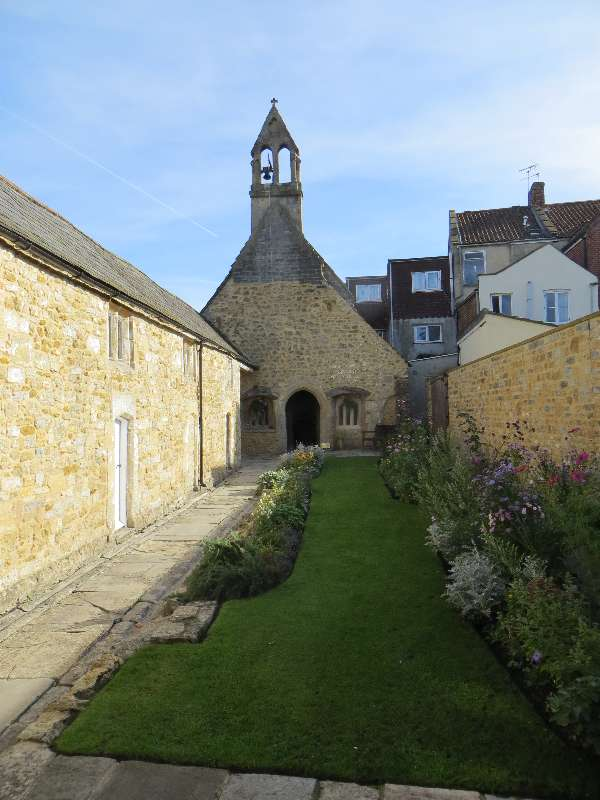

- Location within Somerset
- 51.1450°N 2.7178°W
- Location: Glastonbury, Somerset, England

History
- Built: c. 1310

Listed Building – Grade II*
- Official name: Almshouses and Chapel of St Mary Magdalene's Hospital
- Designated: 21 June 1950
- Reference no.: 1057909

Scheduled monument
- Official name: Part of the Hospital of St Mary Magdalene, Magdalene Street
- Designated: 24 April 1951
- Reference no.: 1020789

The Hospital of St Mary Magdalene is a former Catholic religious complex in Glastonbury, Somerset, England. It built around 1310 by the Benedictine monks of Glastonbury Abbey. The hospital is a Grade II* listed building, and a portion has been scheduled as an ancient monument.

== History ==
The hospital was built before 1322, as almshouses for ten men, with a chapel. Parts of the original chapel still survive. This was once attached to a hall which was demolished after the Dissolution of the Monasteries. The rest of the buildings are late medieval, believed to have been built in 1444.

A previous hospital supported by Glastonbury Abbey moved to the current site around 1250 and in 1460 dedicated to Mary Magdalene the patron saint of lepers. In the 16th century it was considered a chantry and financial support for the brethren and priest being given by the abbey until the dissolution. After this funding was provided by the crown and county treasurer of hospitals.

The hall roof was removed and the cubicles on each side converted into individual dwellings, or cells, leading to the chapel. In the early 17th century the almshouses were described as "ruinous" and by 1703 the chapel had lost its roof.

In the 19th century conversion and updating reduced the number of dwellings and provided a communal wash house. The south side of the parallel rows was demolished in the 1960s and a communal garden and flats for the elderly built on the site. One of the almshouses has been restored and is open to the public.

== Architecture ==
The stone chapel is a single room. The original lancet window has been blocked up. On the roof is a small bellcote which is more recent than the walls of the building. It has space for two bells one of which still exists. The cells are of two storeys and have slate roofs.

== See also ==
- Leper hospitals in medieval England
