= Glastonbury the Movie =

- Directed by: William Beaton; Robin Mahoney; Matthew Salkeld
- Produced by: William Beaton; Robin Mahoney; Matthew Salkeld
- Starring: Spiritualized; Ozric Tentacles; The Lemonheads; The Verve; Porno for Pyros
- Release date: 12 June 1996
- Running time: 96 minutes
- Language: English

Glastonbury the Movie is a 1996 documentary film about the Glastonbury Festival produced and directed by William Beaton, Robin Mahoney and Matthew Salkeld.

== About the film ==
Glastonbury the Movie is the second film made of the Glastonbury Festival, following 1971's Glastonbury Fayre. Like the earlier film, it mixes footage of bands playing and scenes of festival goers.

The film was shot at the 1993 festival. The film is structured into telling the story of the festival day by day from the Friday through Saturday and finishing on the Sunday.

29 June 2012 saw the UK cinema release of Robin Mahoney's Glastonbury The Movie In Flashback, re-worked as new with contemporary digital cinema technology. The later film features some 45 minutes of previously unseen material, new performances including ones from Stereo MCs and The Orb and a roots-to-branch re-structuring.

On 29 June 2012, Glastonbury the Movie in Flashback was released for the first time as a digital download, as a Blu-ray and as a DVD box-set with 13 hours of video and over 24 hours of audio. At the time of filming, mindful of emerging multimedia technologies the makers documented several extensions of the stories touched on in the film.

Bands featured in the film include:

- Back to the Planet
- Chuck Prophet
- The Lemonheads
- McKoy
- Ozric Tentacles
- Porno for Pyros
- Spiritualized
- Omar
- Stereo MC's
- Airto Moreira
- The Co-Creators
- The Funkin’ Filberts

Additional performances on the DVD box-set include:

- The Orb
- Perry Farrell
- Evan Dando
- Roy Harper
- Ozric Tentacles
- Porno for Pyros
- Si Begg
- Dr Didg
- Charlie Creed-Miles
- Dexter Fletcher

and extended appearances from The Lemonheads, Omar, The Orb, Spiritualized, Roy Harper, The Verve, Perry Farrell / Porno For Pyros, Back To The Planet, Chuck Prophet, Airto Moreira, Evan Dando, Louise Goffin, Andy Guithrie, Ozric Tentacles, Kickshaw, McKoy, Si Begg, The Co-Creators, Cristian Vogel, Dr Didg, The Filberts, X-Productions, Bender, Charlie Creed-Miles, Dexter Fletcher, the Funkin’ Filberts.

== See also ==
- Glastonbury Anthems
- Glastonbury
