= Glastonbury Anthems =

- Release date: March 2005
- Running time: 120 minutes
- Country: United Kingdom
- Language: English

Glastonbury Anthems is a DVD featuring live performances from the Glastonbury Festival from 1994 to 2004. The performances on the DVD were voted for by fans on the official festival website. Extras include A Visit to the Glastonbury Greenfields, Glastonbury by Air, a 1995 interview with Michael and Jean Eavis, a photo gallery and footage from the 1971 film Glastonbury Fayre

Producer: Ben Challis. Co-producer: Caroline McGee. Executive producers for EMI: Stefan Demetriou and Jo Brooks. Executive producers for the BBC: Mark Cooper and Alison Howe. Artwork Alex Creedy. Festival Organisers Michael Eavis & Emily Eavis. Mastered and authored at Abbey Road Studios. Directors: Gavin Taylor (1994, 1995) Janet Fraser Crook (1997-2004), Declan Lowney (1994-2004) & Phil Heyes (2004). A Visit To The Glastonbury Greenfields directed and Produced by Dorian Williams. Released by EMI.

== Performances ==
1. Franz Ferdinand, "The Dark of the Matinée" (2004)
2. Travis, "Driftwood" (2000)
3. Faithless, "We Come 1" (2002)
4. Manic Street Preachers, "A Design for Life" (1999)
5. Moby, "Why Does My Heart Feel So Bad" (2000)
6. Robbie Williams, "Angels" (1998)
7. Supergrass, "Pumping On Your Stereo" (2003)
8. Ash, "Shining Light" (2002)
9. The Levellers, "One Way" (1994)
10. Primal Scream, "Rocks" (2003)
11. Elastica, "Connection" (1995)
12. The Chemical Brothers, "Hey Boy Hey Girl" (2000)
13. Basement Jaxx, "Good Luck" (2004)
14. Coldplay, "Yellow" (2002)
15. Fun Lovin' Criminals, "Scooby Snacks" (1999)
16. The Prodigy, "Breathe" (1997)
17. Blur, "This Is a Low" (1994)
18. Placebo, "The Crawl" (1998)
19. Radiohead, "Karma Police" (1997)
20. Paul McCartney, "Hey Jude" (2004)

== See also ==
- Glastonbury (film)
- Glastonbury Fayre (film)
- Glastonbury the Movie
