= Sri Lankan cricket team in England in 1991 =

International cricket tour

The Sri Lanka cricket team toured England in the 1991 season to play an itinerary that included one Test match against England.

England won the test by 137 runs.

== Test series summary ==
22 – 27 August 1991
(5–day match)
Scorecard

England	v	Sri Lanka
282 (95 overs); AJ Stewart 113* (240); RJ Ratnayake 5/69 (27 overs)		224 (68.1 overs); UC Hathurusingha 66 (201); PAJ DeFreitas 7/70 (26 overs)
364/3d (85.1 overs); GA Gooch 174 (252); SD Anurasiri 3/135 (36.1 overs)		285 (103.3 overs); ST Jayasuriya 66 (70); PCR Tufnell 5/94 (34.3 overs)

England won by 137 runs
Lord's, London
Umpires: HD Bird and JH Hampshire
Player of the match: AJ Stewart (ENG) and RJ Ratnayake (SL)

- England won the toss and elected to bat.
- 25 August was taken as a rest day.
- KIW Wijegunawardene (SL) made his Test debut.

== External sources ==
- CricketArchive
