= Glastonbury Fayre (film) =

1972 film by Peter Neal and Nicolas Roeg

- Theatrical release poster
- Directed by: Peter Neal; Nicolas Roeg
- Produced by: David Puttnam; Sanford Lieberson
- Starring: Terry Reid; Linda Lewis; Fairport Convention; Magic Michael; Family; Melanie; Arthur Brown and Kingdom Come; Quintessence; Daevid Allen and Gong; Traffic
- Production companies: Colossal Pictures; Goodtimes Enterprises
- Release date: May 1972
- Running time: 87 minutes
- Language: English

Glastonbury Fayre is a 1972 documentary film directed by Peter Neal and Nicolas Roeg. It covers the 1971 Glastonbury Festival (then known as the Glastonbury Fayre) which took place on 20 to 24 June 1971 in rural Somerset in England. It was released in May 1972.

The film is a mix of performances by musical artists such as Traffic, Fairport Convention, Melanie, Terry Reid, and Arthur Brown, along with extensive footage of the attendees dancing to the music, playing in drum circles, camping out, and otherwise enjoying the festival. It also includes part of a lecture given by Guru Maharaj Ji, referred to in the movie as "Maharishi". It does not feature any footage of David Bowie, who played at dawn, but he is on the soundtrack.

== Music ==
The film includes performances from:

- Arthur Brown's Kingdom Come – "All Forms and Distinctions"
- Family – "Drowned in Wine"
- Fairport Convention – "Dirty Linen"
- Gong – "Tried So Hard"
- Linda Lewis
- Magic Michael
- Melanie – "Peace Will Come (According to Plan)"
- Quintessence – "Giants"
- Terry Reid (with Linda Lewis) – "Dean"
- Traffic – "Gimme Some Lovin''"
- Trumpton and the Riots
- Tonto's Expanding Head Band

== Production ==
Glastonbury Fayre was the first film about the Glastonbury Festival, which in 1971 was in its second year. It was one of the first movies produced by David Puttnam.

== Home video ==
The film received a VHS release during the 1990s. A DVD of the film was released with the CD edition of the Akarma reissue of the album. A four-minute clip of the film is featured on the extras of the 2005 Glastonbury Anthems DVD. The movie was later released on DVD and Blu-ray as Glastonbury Fayre: 1971 – The True Spirit of Glastonbury. It has also been made available on streaming services.

== Album ==
A three-disc LP of performances from the festival, Glastonbury Fayre, was also released in 1972 and has since become a collector's item. However, it features no performances in common with the film. It also includes some songs that were not recorded at the festival – for example, the Grateful Dead performing "Dark Star" at the Empire Pool in London on 8 April 1972.

== Critical reception ==
In a contemporary review The Monthly Film Bulletin wrote: "Conceived as a quasi-religious celebration rather than as yet another marathon music show-case, Glastonbury Fayre was a fiveday Midsummer festival held in 1971. And Peter Neal (brought in to assemble footage which at one time seemed uncertain to reach the screen) has rightly chosen to relegate the music to a subsidiary but vital linking role, and to concentrate on documenting the occasion itself. In a stunning Traffic performance of "Gimme Some Loving", for example, the cameras whimsically meander around the stage, pointing at everything but vocalist Stevie Winwood and even surveying the scene at one moment through a piece of pink cellophane. This sort of throwaway approach is more successful when the camera catches Arthur Brown, self-styled psychedelic Satanist, relaxing like any ordinary mortal while his group knock themselves out a few feet away; though the roving lens really comes into its own when chronicling the scattered activities of the crowd, which range from saluting the dawn to riding half-naked on a motorbike pillion. Neal neatly juxtaposes the spontaneous Hallelujah-chanting of the assembled throngs with the Monday-morning faces of the celebrants at an unduly solemn mass. He is perhaps too sympathetic to the Fayre to point up the irony of the boy founder of the Divine Light Mission entering the festival fields in a flash limousine, and he seems generally at pains to establish the Fayre's spiritual credentials and its uniqueness (symbolised in the recurring shots of the blue pyramid structure which houses the stage). Despite Neal's efforts, the film remains shapeless and never really gets to grips with the Fayre as a phenomenon; it is, however, an interesting record of what was possibly the last collective flowering of the Beautiful People."

In 2009 Uncut said, "The live footage does include some dreck... but there are actually a few cracking musical performances: Terry Reid opens the film with an incendiary version of "Dean", while Traffic close it with a pulsating Brazilian-tinged "Gimme Some Lovin'". However, just as one can still idle away an enjoyable four days at Glasto without stepping anywhere near a music stage, the film captures how music has always been tangential to the Glastonbury Festival experience."

In 2018 Inside Pulse wrote, "Because Glastonbury Fayre was not a cult hit like the other festival films, viewings have been rather tough over the decades. But this is an absorbing film of what a festival's like when you're not being crushed by hundreds of thousands of drunks. This is just a few thousand folks tripping out with room to roam. Roeg and his crew do get deep into the activities of the four days. They are willing to explore the various spiritual moments that took play with various religious leaders in between the songs. They get as good a view of the audience as the performers."

In 2019 The Irish News said, "Impressive though the musical turns are... it's the trappings of Glastonbury Fayre that make it such an attractive viewing proposition in 2019. This is a barefooted step back into a more innocent and less cynical world and Roeg fashions an affectionate picture of sun-obsessed music lovers all seeking a little peace and tranquillity in a rapidly changing world."

In 2020 The Spinning Image said, "Indeed, there are scenes of stark-naked hippies rolling around in said mud as if they were imitating what they had seen in the far more famous music documentary of Woodstock the previous year. The music was somewhat muddy-sounding too, but well-played enough to get the spirit of the tunes, ranging from Melanie belting out her anthem to the finale with Steve Winwood and Traffic getting the audience going in the darkness..."

In 2021 Diabolique Magazine said, "Although Glastonbury Fayre does not feature all of the performers who participated onstage that year (notably headliners Joan Baez, Hawkwind, and a young David Bowie are missing), nonetheless it remains a fascinating record of a place in time.... As integral a part the musical performances are within the film, they are not the sole raison d'être for Glastonbury Fayre. Directors Nicolas Roeg and Peter Neal also focus on the intensely colourful sea of attendees."

== See also ==
- Glastonbury Fayre (album) – album recorded at the 1971 festival and elsewhere
- Glastonbury the Movie – 1996 film about the 1993 festival
- Glastonbury Anthems – 2005 DVD with live performances from 1994 to 2004
- Glastonbury (film) – 2006 film about the history of the festival from 1970 to 2005
