= K. W. Gransden =

English author and educator (1925–1998)

Karl Watts Gransden
- Photographed in 1986, as a judge of the Society of Authors's Eric Gregory Award
- Born: 24 April 1925; Herne Bay, Kent, England
- Died: 25 July 1998 (aged 73)
- Spouse: Antonia Morland (m. 1956; sep. 1977)

Academic background
- Education: City of London School; Jesus College, Cambridge

Karl Watts Gransden (24 February 1925 – 25 July 1998) was a British poet and an editor, translator, scholar, and teacher of Latin and English literature. He spent his career at the British Museum and the University of Warwick.

== Life ==
K. W. Gransden (called "Ken" by his friends) was born in Herne Bay, Kent. He attended the City of London School and, following National Service, studied classics at Jesus College, Cambridge, graduating with a double first. He married Antonia Morland, a scholar of medieval English history, in 1956. The couple had two daughters and separated in 1977, though he continued to be cited as her husband at the time of her death.

== Career ==
Gransden was invited to work for the British intelligence services, but declined in favour of an academic career. From 1951 to 1957, Gransden worked in the manuscript department at the British Museum. He left the museum to pursue a career as a poet, writer, and literary socialite, but soon returned to academia. In 1965, he was one of four founders of the Department of English and Comparative Literature at the University of Warwick, where he helped to create a department with young scholars such as Germaine Greer and Antony Easthope. Students and colleagues took note of his friendship with E. M. Forster, whose authorized biography Gransden had written; he had a similar role as critic and friend of Angus Wilson. He was later the first department chair of the Classics department, and taught both there and in English until his retirement in 1991. Gransden continued throughout this time to write poetry and to foster the careers of younger poets, including as a longtime judge for the Eric Gregory Award and coeditor of the Gregory Anthology.

== Writings ==
While at the British Museum, Gransden was a regular contributor to The British Museum Quarterly, documenting recent acquisitions in modern and earlier manuscripts. His expertise in ancient and Renaissance literature as well as his own experience as a poet and member of the English literati allowed him to comment in detail on the significance of the museum's holdings. He analysed the collections of Dylan Thomas's abandoned early experiments in "social realism"; letters from writers such as D. H. Lawrence and Katherine Mansfield acquired along with the papers of the considerably less well-known S. S. Koteliansky; and the "political manœuvrings" revealed by the museum's enormous cache of Medici Family documents.

Gransden turned toward poetry shortly after leaving the museum. His first book of poems, Any Day, was not universally well received: one reviewer contextualizes it within "some backwash of the forties" and finds Gransden "rather young to be so dated." His only other book of poetry was a chapbook of fifteen poems published by Peter Scupham's small fine-press, Mandeville, in 1981, in a limited edition of 250 copies. Gransden was never primarily a poet, but he gained respectability among those who were, and Philip Larkin included his "An Interview" in The Oxford Book of Twentieth Century English Verse. His connections to other writers proved more fruitful than his own creative work, none more so than E. M. Forster, who recommended Gransden's book about him most among the many that were published in the last decade of Forster's life.

What is the secret of your long innings, sir?
Have you any tips to pass on to us?
—Try and grow used to the place of every star
And forget your own dark house.

— From "An Interview", 1960

In addition to modern literature by older writers in his circle, the subjects of Gransden's early work were primarily poets of the English Renaissance, including John Donne and Edmund Spenser. It was only after 1970 that he turned to the commentary on Latin poetry, particularly Virgil, that would ultimately be his most influential work. His primary analytical work on Virgil, an account of the narrative techniques of the second half of the poem (which Gransden thought of as "Iliadic") from the perspective of a modern reader, has a somewhat uncomfortable relationship to classical scholarship of the time (and classicists were quick to note Gransden's background in English literature). His lasting legacy comes from his commentaries for students, including separate commentaries on Books VIII and XI of the Aeneid and a student guide to the whole poem, all for Cambridge University Press, and the anthology of Virgilian translation in English he prepared for Penguin. A review by Alexander McKay praised Gransden's "sensitivity to the tonality and rich implications of Vergil". A series of journal articles throughout this period extended Gransden's work on Virgil's debt to Greek poets and his influence on English ones, such as an article that pursues the topic of the sacking of Troy from its earliest fragmentary mentions through the Aeneid and on to Shakespeare's Othello and beyond.

== Selected works ==
- John Donne. New York: Longmans, Green, 1954. OCLC 219547042
- Any Day: Poems. London: Abelard-Schuman, 1960. OCLC 560027996
- E. M. Forster. New York: Grove, 1962. Edinburgh: Oliver and Boyd, 1962. OCLC 265447141
- Tennyson: In Memoriam. London: E. Arnold, 1964. OCLC 870092098
- Angus Wilson. New York: Longmans, Green, 1969. ISBN 0582012082
- A Critical Commentary on Spenser's "The Faerie Queene." London: Macmillan, 1969. ISBN 0333080661
- Tudor Verse Satire (editor). London: Athlone, 1970. ISBN 0485136015
- Aeneid, Book VIII (editor). London: Cambridge University Press, 1976. ISBN 0521211131
- The Last Picnic. Hitchin: Mandeville, 1981. ISBN 9780904533538
- Virgil's Iliad: An Essay on Epic Narrative. Cambridge: Cambridge University Press, 1984. ISBN 0521287561
- Virgil: The Aeneid (students' guide). Cambridge: Cambridge University Press, 1990, reprinted 2004. ISBN 0521323290
- Aeneid, Book XI (editor). Cambridge: Cambridge University Press, 1991. ISBN 9780521278164
- Virgil in English (editor). London: Penguin, 1996. ISBN 0140423869
