= Morlands =

English clothing manufacturer

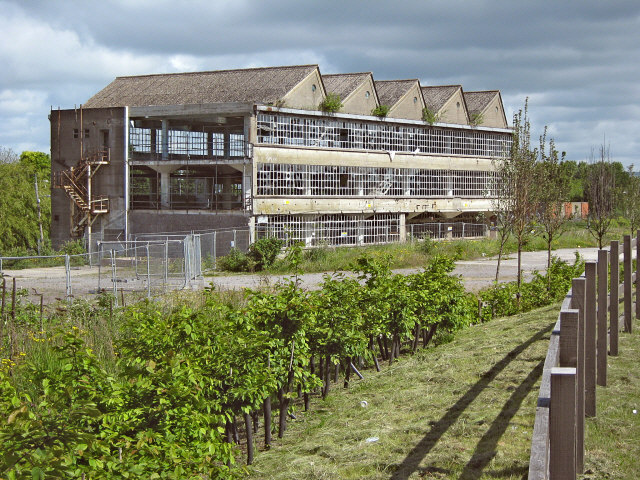
The Morlands factory in Glastonbury in 2009

Morlands was a retailer of sheepskin products, based in the South West of England. The company originally manufactured sheepskin jackets, boots, and other footwear from its base in Glastonbury in Somerset, England. The retailer held a closing down sale advertised on their website in January 2024, signalling their intention to close down. Morlands of Glastonbury closed its online store in March 2024.

== History ==
In 1870, John Morland (1838–1934) bought a tannery in Glastonbury, particularly attracted by the water (essential to the tanning process), which he described as being "of unusual purity".

John Morland was chairman from the day he founded the company until he died in 1934 at the age of 96. A devout Christian, he was a highly regarded speaker at Quaker meetings, both in Great Britain and abroad. He was four times the mayor of Glastonbury and a member of the Liberal Party. Both his sons and grandsons went on to become directors of the company.

Morlands produced a range of products from sheepskin including, from the early 20th century, coats, rugs, and foot muffs for Motor car drivers. In 1928 the company made a profit of £13,867. In 1940, Morlands made flying jackets and boots for the RAF pilots who fought in the Battle of Britain, although this caused some ethical discussions within the Quaker family.

The company was a family business for over a hundred years before running into difficulties in the recession of the 1980s. The large tannery closed and the manufacturing process was moved to a smaller building. Boots and gloves are still available. It was part of the G.R. Holdings company in the 1990s and 2000s before being taken over by Whitworth CS Holdings in 2019.

The 31-acre (130,000 m^{2}) site of the old Morlands factory in Glastonbury was scheduled for demolition and redevelopment into a new light industrial park, although there have been some protests that the buildings should be reused rather than being demolished. As part of the redevelopment of the site, a project has been established by the Glastonbury Community Development Trust to provide support for local unemployed people applying for employment, starting in self-employment and accessing work-related training.
