= Glastonbury Festival 2002 =

Music festival in England

- Locations: Worthy Farm, Pilton, Somerset, England
- Previous event: Glastonbury Festival 2000
- Next event: Glastonbury Festival 2003

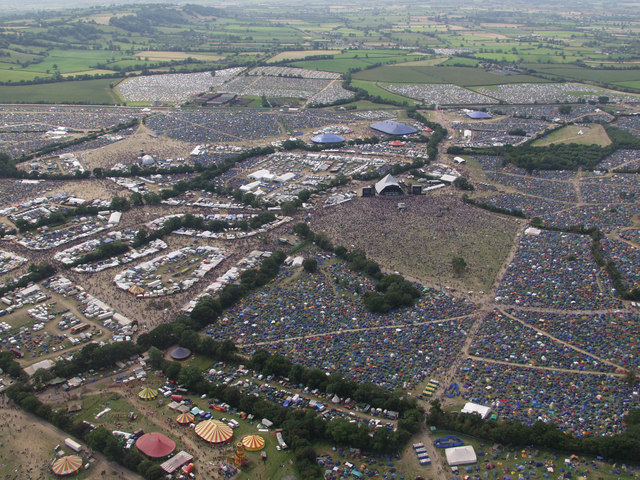
Overhead Glastonbury Festival site (2002) Looking across Worthy Farm towards Steanbow with the north side of Pennard Hill to the left. Helicopter almost directly above the Acoustic Stage oriented towards the Pyramid main stage.

Glastonbury Festival 2002 cost £97 to the 140,000 paying audience.

The organisers used the scheduled fallow year 2001 to devise anti-gatecrashing measures and secure the future of the festival, after the Roskilde Festival 2000 accident It was at this point that the Mean Fiddler Organisation was invited to help.

In 2002 the festival returned, with the controversial Mean Fiddler now handling the logistics and security – especially installing a substantial surrounding fence (dubbed the "superfence") that reduced numbers to the levels of a decade earlier. 2002 also saw Coldplay headline the Pyramid Stage for the first time while the show was closed by a set from Rod Stewart on the Sunday night.

== Pyramid stage ==
Friday	Saturday	Sunday
Coldplay (replaced The Strokes); Faithless; Ash; Nelly Furtado; Doves; The Dandy Warhols; Bush; Alabama 3; Shibusashirazu Orchestra	Stereophonics; The Charlatans; The White Stripes; Starsailor; Ian Brown; No Doubt; Jools Holland; Ani di Franco; Dreadzone	Rod Stewart; Roger Waters; Isaac Hayes; Badly Drawn Boy; Super Furry Animals; Manu Chao; Rolf Harris; Avalonian Free State Choir; Town Band

== Other stage ==
Friday	Saturday	Sunday
Garbage; Spiritualized; Mercury Rev; Queens of the Stone Age; Lostprophets; Idlewild; Cooper Temple Clause; Ed Harcourt; Vex Red; Ikara Colt (swapped with Dropkick Murphys)	Orbital; Beta Band; Less Than Jake; The Vines; Rival Schools; Electric Soft Parade; Haven; The Coral; The Parkinsons; The Shining; Dog	Air; Groove Armada; Belle and Sebastian; Elbow; Black Rebel Motorcycle Club; Hundred Reasons; New Model Army; My Vitriol; The Soundtrack of Our Lives; Dropkick Murphys (swapped with Ikara Colt); Simon Kaye

The Line-up also included Spearhead
