= Glastonbury Festival 2000 =

Music festival in England

- Locations: Worthy Farm, Pilton, Somerset, England
- Previous event: Glastonbury Festival 1999
- Next event: Glastonbury Festival 2002

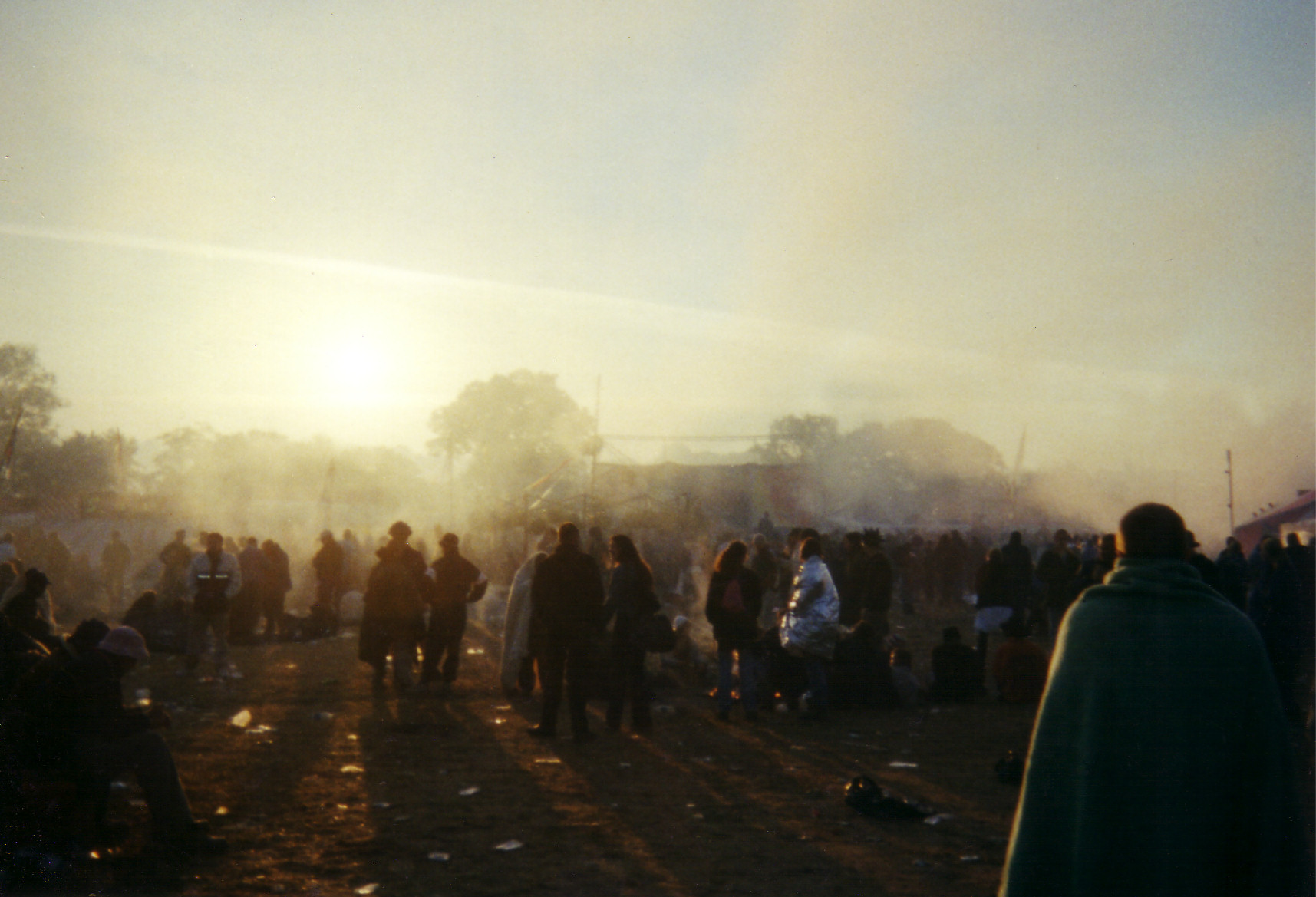
Techno music is played on a sound system at dawn, Glastonbury 2000.

A new Pyramid Stage was introduced for the Glastonbury Festival of Contemporary Performing Arts 2000. Other new areas included The Glade and The Left Field. The festival was headlined by Chemical Brothers, Travis and David Bowie, who played thirty years after his first appearance.

The Pyramid Stage also hosted an unusual event on the Saturday morning, with the wedding of two festivalgoers, who had written to the organisers asking for permission to get married there, taking place and conducted by actor Keith Allen in front of a small group of friends and any other festivalgoers who still happened to be awake.

== Tickets and attendance ==
This year also saw an estimated 250,000 people attend the festival (only 100,000 tickets were sold) due to gatecrashers. This led to public safety concerns and the local District Council refused any further licences until the problem was solved.

The organisers used the scheduled fallow year 2001 to devise anti-gatecrashing measures and secure the future of the festival, after the Roskilde Festival 2000 accident.

== Pyramid stage ==
Friday	Saturday	Sunday
The Chemical Brothers; Macy Gray; Counting Crows; Cypress Hill; The Bluetones; Live; G. Love & Special Sauce (replaced Eagle-Eye Cherry); The Wailers	Travis; Pet Shop Boys; Ocean Colour Scene; Reef; Semisonic; Brand New Heavies; Asian Dub Foundation; Ladysmith Black Mambazo; Joseph Arthur	David Bowie; Embrace; Happy Mondays; Willie Nelson; David Gray (replaced Burt Bacharach); Jools Holland; Sharon Shannon; Yeovil Town Band

== Other stage ==
Friday	Saturday	Sunday
Nine Inch Nails; Moby; The The; Idlewild; Bloodhound Gang; Methods of Mayhem; Fu Manchu; A Perfect Circle; Cay; Rico	Leftfield; Death in Vegas; Elastica; Feeder; Wannadies; David Gray; Coldplay; Toploader; Soulwax; Clinic; Crashland	Basement Jaxx; Beta Band; Muse; The Dandy Warhols; St Etienne; Dark Star; Badly Drawn Boy (replaced The For Carnation); Jack Lukeman; Wilt; The Blue Aeroplanes; Mo Solid Gold
