= Glastonbury Festival 2003 =

Music festival in England

- Locations: Worthy Farm, Pilton, Somerset, England
- Previous event: Glastonbury Festival 2002
- Next event: Glastonbury Festival 2004

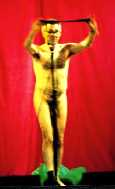
Malcolm Hardee performing as part of The Greatest Show on Legs in the Cabaret Marquee at the Glastonbury Festival, 2003.

The number of tickets was increased to 150,000 for Glastonbury Festival 2003 which sold out within one day of going on sale, in marked contrast to the two months it took to sell 140,000 in 2002. It was also the first year that tickets sold out before the full line-up was announced. This was also the year Radiohead returned to headline the Pyramid Stage. Revenue raised for good causes from ticket and commercial licence sales topped £1 million, half of which went to Oxfam, Greenpeace and Water Aid.

== Pyramid stage ==
Friday	Saturday	Sunday
R.E.M.; David Gray; Suede; The Music (replaced Zwan); Mogwai; De La Soul; Echo & the Bunnymen; Inspiral Carpets; The Darkness	Radiohead; The Flaming Lips; Supergrass; Turin Brakes; The Polyphonic Spree; Jimmy Cliff; Jools Holland; Ozomatli; Ben Andrews	Moby; Manic Street Preachers; Feeder; Macy Gray; Sugababes; Asian Dub Foundation; Waterboys; Leningrad Cowboys; Yeovil Town Band

== Other stage ==
Friday	Saturday	Sunday
Primal Scream; Röyksopp; Idlewild; Electric Six; Cooper Temple Clause; Yo La Tengo; Tom McRae; Athlete; Pete Yorn; Nada Surf; Har Mar Superstar; The Jeevas	Super Furry Animals; The Coral; Love with Arthur Lee; The Libertines; Interpol; The Eighties Matchbox B-Line Disaster; The Thrills; Sparta; Gemma Hayes; 22-20s; Burn; DNA Doll	Doves; Sigur Rós; Dave Gahan; Grandaddy; The Rapture; The Raveonettes; Damien Rice; Sugarcult; My Morning Jacket; Simple Kid; The Gathering; The Rain Band

Line-up also included:

- Yes
- The Streets
- The Delgados
- Bill Bailey (Cabaret Tent)
- Ross Noble (Cabaret Tent)
- Kings of Leon (New Bands Tent)
