= Glastonbury Festival 1999 =

Music festival in England

- Locations: Worthy Farm, Pilton, Somerset, England
- Previous event: Glastonbury Festival 1998
- Next event: Glastonbury Festival 2000

Another hot dry year was recorded for the Glastonbury Festival 1999, much to the relief of organisers and festival goers. The festival was again overcrowded due to fence-jumpers, but this would not prove to be a major problem until the following year, when an additional 100,000 people gatecrashed the site, increasing the attendance to an estimated 250,000 people total.

The 1999 festival is also remembered for the Manic Street Preachers requesting and being given their own backstage toilets; however, it was revealed by the band that this was a joke – the "reserved" sign on the toilet was not at the authorisation of the management.

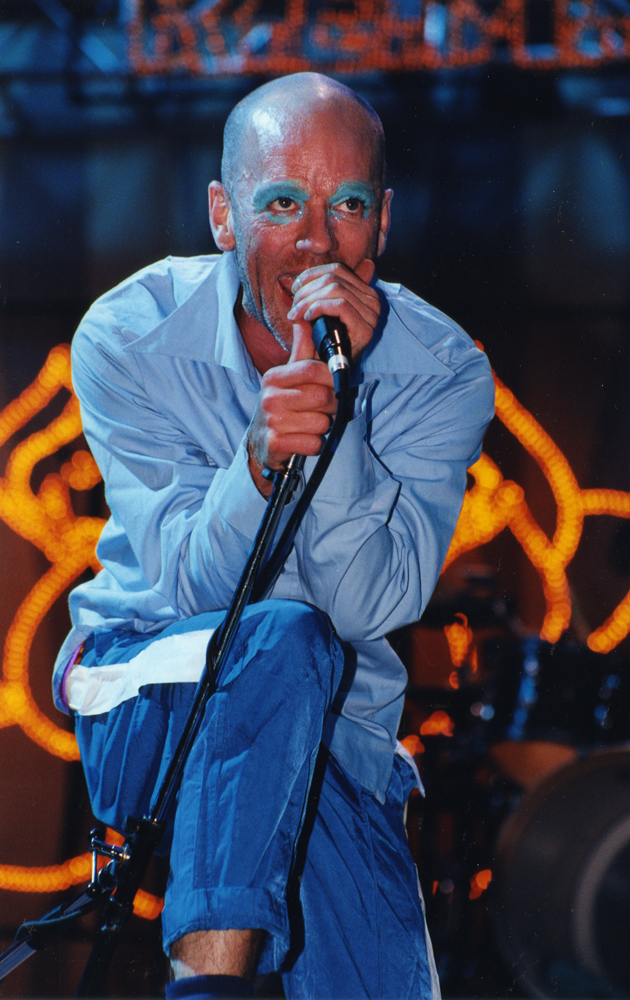
Michael Stipe, lead singer of the band 'R.E.M.', performing on the Pyramid Stage during the 1999 Glastonbury Festival.

All live B-Side tracks from REM's "The Great Beyond" were recorded on June 25, 1999, at the Glastonbury Festival: "Man on the Moon" (live at Glastonbury); "The One I Love" (live at Glastonbury); "Everybody Hurts" (live at Glastonbury).

== Pyramid stage ==
Friday	Saturday	Sunday
R.E.M.; Beautiful South; Hole; Bush; Blondie; Barenaked Ladies; Björn Again	Manic Street Preachers; Underworld; Texas; Ash; Joe Strummer & The Mescaleros; Beth Orton; Eliza Carthy; Billy Bragg; Younger Younger 28s	Skunk Anansie; Fun Lovin' Criminals; Lenny Kravitz; The Corrs; Al Green; Yothu Yindi; Delirious?; London Community Gospel Choir

(Björn Again moved up the bill to replace Ian Dury & The Blockheads, who cancelled their appearance due to illness)

== Other stage ==
Friday	Saturday	Sunday
Kula Shaker; Gomez; Pavement; Wilco; dEUS; Gay Dad; Heather Nova; Queens of the Stone Age; Everlast; Moke; Doves	Paul Oakenfold; Cast; Super Furry Animals; The Cardigans; Travis; The Creatures; Hurricane #1; Straw; Mishka; Fungus; Witness	Mogwai; Mercury Rev; Tindersticks; Feeder; The Delgados; Dogstar; Electrasy; Snowpony; Dr Didg; Toploader; Glastonbury Town Band

Lineup also included:

- Coldplay (New Tent)
- Doves (New Tent)
- David Gray (New Tent)
- Merz (New Tent)
