= The Left Field =

Travelling stage and bar at some British festivals

The Left Field is a travelling stage and bar which forms part of several British festivals. The event is organised by Billy Bragg and Juliet Wills. The Left Field was first designed to tackle apathy and promote left-wing politics and trade unionism in young festival goers at the Glastonbury Festival in 2000. It was a regular fixture at Guilfest and Homelands. It has and Glastonbury festivals, and in 2005 at the Edinburgh Fringe.

The Left Field has featured left-wing musicians, such as Billy Bragg and Asian Dub Foundation, political comedians such as Mark Thomas and commentators including Tony Benn, with a number of speeches and debates taking place at each festival. The Left Field also runs many films, for example exposing the violence in Colombia. The Left Field also promotes campaigns and charities, such as No Sweat and War on Want.
