= Glastonbury Festival 1997 =

Music festival in England

- Locations: Worthy Farm, Pilton, Somerset, England
- Previous event: Glastonbury Festival 1995
- Next event: Glastonbury Festival 1998

Glastonbury Festival of Contemporary Performing Arts returned in 1997 after 1996's fallow year. The attendance was 90,000 and tickets cost £75 including official programme.

This time there was major sponsorship from The Guardian and the BBC, who had taken over televising the event from Channel 4. This was also the year of the mud, with the site suffering severe rainfalls which turned the entire site into a muddy bog. However, those who stayed for the festival were treated to many memorable performances, including Radiohead's headlining Pyramid Stage set on the Saturday which is said to be one of the greatest ever Glastonbury performances. The live recording of "Paranoid Android" from this performance, as well as others such as "The Day Before Yesterday's Man" by The Supernaturals, were released on a BBC CD entitled Mud For It.
