= Glastonbury Festival 1998 =

Music festival in England

- Locations: Worthy Farm, Pilton, Somerset, England
- Previous event: Glastonbury Festival 1997
- Next event: Glastonbury Festival 1999

In 1998 the Glastonbury festival was once again struck with severe floods and storms, and again some festival goers departed early – but those who stayed were treated to performances from acts such as Pulp, Robbie Williams and Blur. Tony Bennett, however, overcame the messy environment in an immaculate white suit and tie. 1998 was also the first year that attendance officially broke the 100,000 mark.
