= Glastonbury Festival 1995 =

Music festival in England

- Locations: Worthy Farm, Pilton, Somerset, England
- Previous event: Glastonbury Festival 1994
- Next event: Glastonbury Festival 1997

Glastonbury Festival 1995 saw the attendance rise drastically due to the security fence being breached on the Friday of the festival. Estimates suggest there may have been enough fence-jumpers to double the size of the festival. This aside, 1995 proved to be a highly successful year with memorable performances from Oasis, Elastica, Pulp, PJ Harvey, Jeff Buckley, Jamiroquai and The Cure. This was also the first year of the festival having a dance tent to cater for the rising popularity of dance music, following the success of Orbital's headline appearance the previous year. The dance acts of 1995 were led by Massive Attack on the Friday and Carl Cox on the Saturday.

The festival took a year off in 1996 to allow the land to recover and give the organisers a break. 1996 also saw the release of Glastonbury the Movie which was filmed at the 1993 and 1994 festivals.
