= Glastonbury Festival 1994 =

Music festival in England

- Locations: Worthy Farm, Pilton, Somerset, England
- Previous event: Glastonbury Festival 1993
- Next event: Glastonbury Festival 1995

Glastonbury 1994 saw 80,000 tickets sold at £59.

In 1994, the Pyramid Stage burned down just over a week before the festival; a temporary main stage was erected in time for the festival. The 1994 festival also introduced a 150 kW wind turbine which provided some of the festival power. Headliners Levellers set another record when they played to a crowd of as many as 300,000 people on their Friday performance, Glastonbury's biggest ever crowd as of 2010.

== Broadcast ==
This was the year the festival was first televised live by Channel 4; the coverage concentrated on the main two music stages and providing a glimpse of the festival for those who knew little of it. Channel 4's 4 Goes to Glastonbury brought widely expanded televised coverage of the festival for the first time in 1994 and also the following year.

=== Orbital's performance ===
The TV broadcast in 1994 was a crucial factor in ensuring that Orbital's performance at the festival achieved legendary status. As a result, living rooms across the country were able to experience what a rave might look like, and suddenly dance music, which had been ignored by the establishment and mainstream press for years, did not seem so dangerous and which would be a turning point for the music at Glastonbury. Speaking to The Guardian in 2013 about the Orbital gig, Michael Eavis noted that it marked dance music's appearance on the mainstream agenda. "What was previously underground made it on to one of the big stages, and there was no going back from there. As the police and the council made me very well aware, the buzz had been around the raves and the market sound systems and in the travellers' fields for years. But it needed a showcase to make it legal." The gig opened the way for others such as the Chemical Brothers, Massive Attack and Underworld, who all played high-profile stages in the following years — developments that led to the launch of the festival's Dance Village in 1997.
