= Glastonbury 1971 =

Music festival in England

- Locations: Worthy Farm, Pilton, Somerset, England
- Previous event: Glastonbury 1970
- Next event: Glastonbury 1978

The Glastonbury Fair of 1971 was instigated by Andrew Kerr after being found and introduced to Michael Eavis by David Trippas and organised with help from Arabella Churchill, Jean Bradbery, Kikan Eriksdotter, John Massara, Jeff Dexter, Thomas Crimble, Bill Harkin, Gilberto Gil, Mark Irons, John Coleman, and Jytte Klamer.

The 1971 festival featured the first incarnation of the "Pyramid Stage". Conceived by Bill Harkin the stage was a one-tenth replica of the Great Pyramid of Giza built from scaffolding and metal sheeting and positioned over a "blind spring", a term used to describe a hypothetical underground body of water in the pseudoscientific practice of dowsing.

Performers included Family, David Bowie, Mighty Baby, Traffic, Fairport Convention, Gong, Hawkwind, Pink Fairies, Skin Alley, The Worthy Farm Windfuckers and Melanie. It was paid for by its supporters and advocates of its ideal, and embraced a mediaeval tradition of music, dance, poetry, theatre, lights, and spontaneous entertainment. The 1971 festival was filmed by Nicolas Roeg and David Puttnam with Eavis and Kerr's Glastonbury Fair changed to Glastonbury Fayre, and a triple album of the same name was released (no connection with the film).
