= Glastonbury 1979 =

Music festival in England

- Locations: Worthy Farm, Pilton, Somerset, England
- Previous event: Glastonbury 1978
- Next event: Glastonbury Festival 1981

Glastonbury Fayre 1979 was a revival by Arabella Churchill, Thomas Crimble, Andrew Kerr and Michael Eavis, in an event for the Year of the Child. It lost money. Tickets cost £5.00 for the 12,000 festival-goers. It was now a three-day event.

In 1979, Churchill set up the children's area and theatre areas, and ran the circus and cabaret tents. This contributed to her launch, in 1981, of the charity Children’s World dedicated to offering creative, educational and drama workshops for children in the South West. It was to stage the Glastonbury Children’s Festival every summer for more than 30 years.
