= Glastonbury Festival 1983 =

Music festival in England

- Locations: Worthy Farm, Pilton, Somerset, England
- Previous event: Glastonbury Festival 1982
- Next event: Glastonbury Festival 1984

Glastonbury CND Festival 1983 was attended by 30,000 with tickets costing £12. Performances included: Dennis Brown, w/ Aswad as backup band; Alexis Korner; Black Roots; The Flying Pickets and Tom Paxton. Julian Cope and James Brown were announced as playing but both withdrew in advance.

== Organisation ==
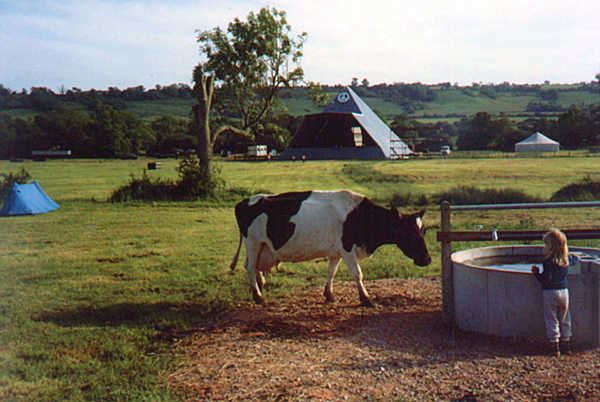
Worthy Farm at the beginning of Glastonbury Festival in 1983. Taken on Wednesday late afternoon. By the start of the festival the tents had advanced half way to the stage.

Since 1983, large festivals have required licences from local authorities. This led to certain restrictions being placed on the festival, including a crowd limit and specified times during which the stages could operate. The crowd limit was initially set at 30,000 but has grown every year to over 100,000.

Radio Avalon was a pirate radio station set up at the Glastonbury Festival near Glastonbury, England, in 1983. It later became a legally recognised station. In 2007, Radio Avalon was replaced with Worthy FM.

Glastonbury Festival played a key cultural role in this period. The festival's long-term campaigning relationships have been with CND (1981–1990), Greenpeace (1992 onwards), and Oxfam (because of its campaigning against the arms trade), as well as the establishment of the Green Fields as a regular and expanding eco-feature of the festival (from 1984 on). The radical peace movement and the rise of the greens in Britain are interwoven at Glastonbury. The festival has offered these campaigns and groups space on-site to publicise and disseminate their ideas, and it has ploughed large sums of money from the festival profits into them, as well as other causes. June 1981 saw the first Glastonbury CND Festival, and over the 1980s as a decade Glastonbury raised around £1m for CND. The CND logo topped Glastonbury's pyramid stage, while publicity regularly proclaimed proudly: 'This Event is the most effective Anti-Nuclear Fund Raiser in Europe'.

== Pyramid stage ==
Friday	Saturday	Sunday
Melanie; Marillion; Jean-Philippe Rykiel	UB40; Aswad; The Beat; Moving Hearts; A Certain Ratio; The Enid; The Farm Band	King Sunny Ade & His African Beats; Curtis Mayfield; Fun Boy Three; The Chieftains; Incantation
