= Glastonbury 1970 =

Music festival in England

- Locations: Worthy Farm, Pilton, Somerset, England
- Next event: Glastonbury 1971

The first Glastonbury festival was promoted as the Pop, Blues & Folk Festival and was held on Saturday 19 September 1970 at Worthy Farm, Pilton in Somerset. Tickets were £1 (equivalent to £20.08 in 2026) The festival was attended by 1,500 people; the farmer & CND campaigner, Michael Eavis had hoped to get a crowd of 5,000.

Eavis decided to host the first festival after seeing an open-air concert headlined by Led Zeppelin at the Bath Festival of Blues and Progressive Music at the nearby Bath and West Showground yearlier that year.: "12,000 people turned up for five days of music, dance, poetry, theatre and entertainment during which Hawkwind, David Bowie, Joan Baez and Fairport Convention gave performances". Randolph Churchill's former literary assistant, Andrew Kerr, was staying at Worthy Farm. He was planning to stage "a free summer festival with 'cosmic significance' in one of the fields". Randolph's daughter Arabella Churchill put in up to £4,000 from a family trust fund to, among other things, purchase materials for Bill Harkin’s "visionary Pyramid Stage". Churchill helped them stage the first full-scale incarnation of the Glastonbury Festival.

The original headline acts were The Kinks and Wayne Fontana and the Mindbenders but these acts were replaced at short notice by Tyrannosaurus Rex, later known as T. Rex. Other billed acts of note were Steamhammer, Quintessence, Stackridge, Al Stewart, Pink Fairies and Keith Christmas.

There had been a commercial UK festival tradition which included the National Jazz and Blues Festival and the Isle of Wight Festival.
