= Glastonbury Festival 1985 =

Music festival in England

- Locations: Worthy Farm, Pilton, Somerset, England
- Previous event: Glastonbury Festival 1984
- Next event: Glastonbury Festival 1986

Glastonbury CND Festival 1985 was attended by 40,000 with tickets costing £16. The festival included performances by Echo & The Bunnymen, Aswad, Joe Cocker, Style Council, The Boomtown Rats. and Ian Dury. The festival had grown too large for Worthy Farm, but neighbouring Cockmill Farm was purchased.

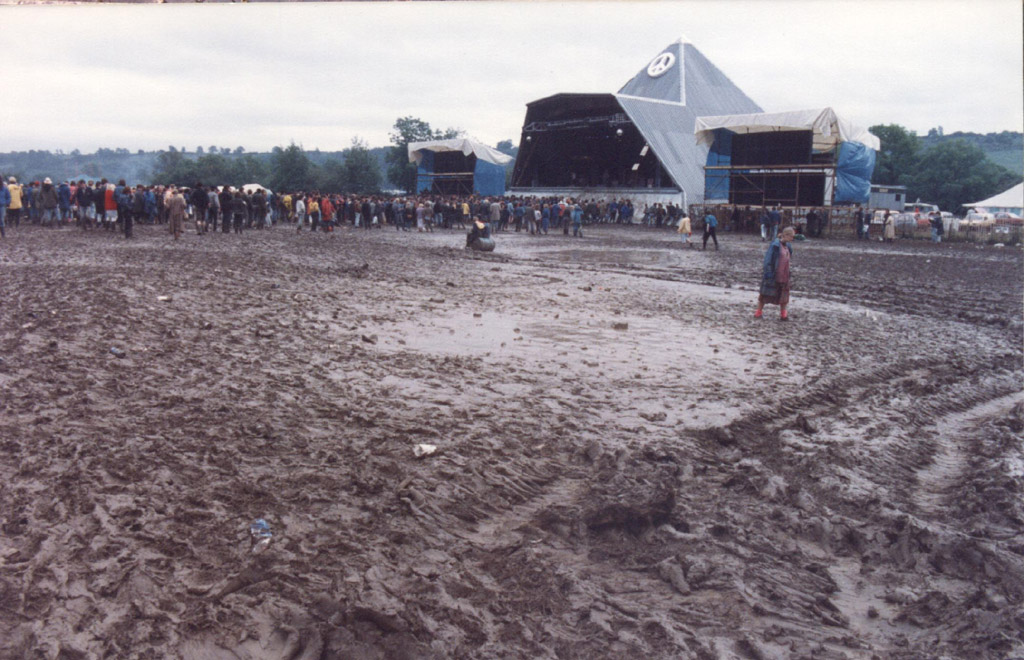
The Pyramid Stage in 1985. Due to heavy rainfall, a large area of mud covered this area.

This year saw a wet festival with considerable rain; Worthy Farm is a dairy farm and what washed down into the low areas was a mixture of mud and liquefied cow dung. This did not prevent festival goers from enjoying the knee-deep slurry in front of the Pyramid Stage.

== Pyramid stage ==
Friday	Saturday	Sunday
Joe Cocker; King; Third World; Boomtown Rats; The Pogues; The Untouchables	Ian Dury and the Blockheads; The Style Council; Midnight Oil; Aswad; Working Week; New Model Army	Hugh Masekela; Echo & the Bunnymen; The Colourfield; John Martyn; Billy Bragg; Green On Red; The Triffids

== Other stage ==
Friday	Saturday	Sunday
Black Roots; Somo Somo; El Sondro De Londres; Eduardo and Antonio; Son of Kolo; The Blue Aeroplanes; Jonathan Richman & The Modern Lovers; Solstice	Asaah Papa and Graffi Jazz; The Ariwa Posse; Poison Girls; Toxic Shock; Green on Red; Steve Payne & Guests; Eduardo and Antonio; The Happy End; OVA	Chevalier Brothers; Misty in Roots; Doctor and The Medics; Hank Wangford; The Men They Couldn't Hang; James; Microdisney; The Jazz Butcher; Doctor's Children; Rodney Allen
