= Glastonbury Festival 1981 =

Music festival in England

- Locations: Worthy Farm, Pilton, Somerset, England
- Previous event: Glastonbury 1979
- Next event: Glastonbury Festival 1982

Glastonbury CND Festival 1981 saw 18,000 people pay £8 a ticket.

== Organisation ==
The 1980s saw the festival become an annual fixture, barring periodic fallow years. In 1981, Michael Eavis took back sole control of the festival, and it was organised in conjunction with the Campaign for Nuclear Disarmament (CND). That year a new Pyramid Stage was constructed from telegraph poles and metal sheeting (repurposed from materials of the Ministry of Defence), a permanent structure which doubled as a hay barn and cowshed during the winter.

In the 1980s, the children's area of the festival (which had been organised by Arabella Churchill and others) became the starting point for a new children's charity called Children's World. 1981 was the first year that the festival made profits, and Eavis donated £20,000 of them to CND (equivalent to £77,102 in 2025). In the following years, donations were made to a number of organisations, and since the end of the Cold War the main beneficiaries have been Oxfam, Greenpeace and WaterAid, who all contribute towards the festival by providing features and volunteers, who work at the festival in exchange for free entry.

It also saw the first TV coverage, with ITV broadcasting recorded highlights in the weeks after the festival.

== Pyramid stage ==
| Friday | Saturday | Sunday |
|---|---|---|
| Ginger Baker's Nutters; Roy Harper; Robert Hunter; Stan Webb's Chicken Shack; Thompson Twins; Beverley Martyn | Hawkwind; New Order; Jazz Sluts; Matumbi; Decline and Fall; The Sound; John Cooper Clarke; Rab Noakes | Taj Mahal; Ronnie Lane's Slim Chance; Gordon Giltrap; Mother Gong; Supercharge |

- Ronnie Lane's Slim Chance replaced Judie Tzuke who cancelled due to laryngitis.
