= Glastonbury Festival 2011 =

2011 performing arts festival in England

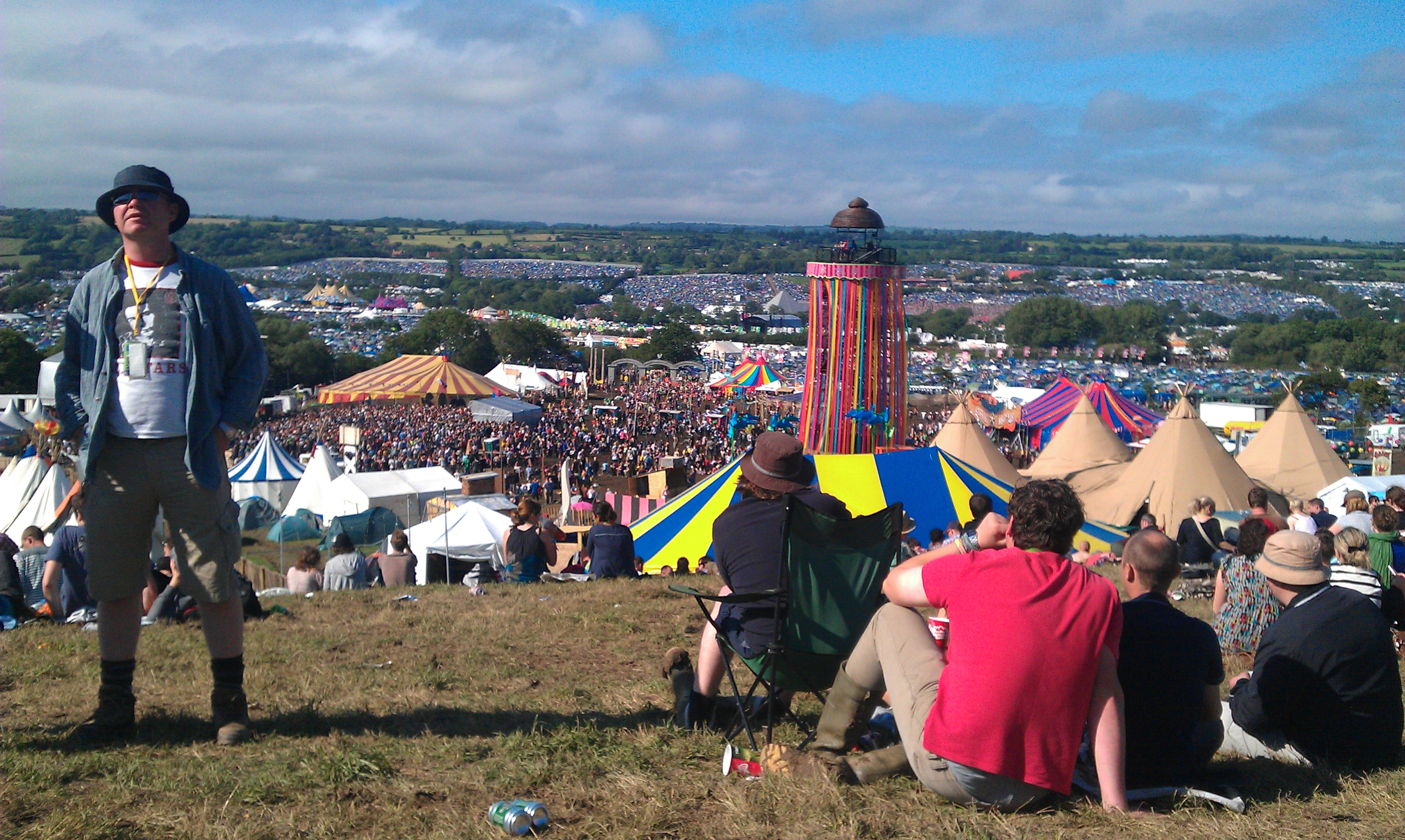
- A view over the Glastonbury festival from the Park Stage, Saturday 25 June 2011
- Date: 22 June 2011 – 26 June 2011
- Locations: Worthy Farm, Pilton, Somerset, England
- Previous event: Glastonbury Festival 2010
- Next event: Glastonbury Festival 2013

The 2011 Glastonbury Festival of Contemporary Performing Arts was held from 22 to 26 June. Tickets for the festival went on sale from 9 am on Sunday 3 October 2010, over 37 weeks before the festival was set to begin, with a deposit of £50 being paid, while the whole cost of a ticket is £195 (+£5 booking fee and postage and packaging).

It was the last regular edition of Glastonbury until 2013, to make way for the 2012 Summer Olympics and 2012 Summer Paralympics.

== Ticket sales ==
Half the tickets were sold within the first 2 hours and a quarter of the tickets still available by 12pm despite issues with people purchasing tickets. Tickets sold out in 4 hours.

On 15 February, Coldplay were announced the Saturday night headliner on the Pyramid Stage. Later on the same day, Emily Eavis confirmed that Beyoncé would headline on the Sunday evening. U2 were announced on 24 February as the Friday evening headliners.

== Line-up ==
Headline acts on the Pyramid Stage were U2, Coldplay and Beyoncé, performing on the Friday, Saturday and Sunday respectively; with Beyoncé as Glastonbury's premier finale for 2011.

Pyramid Stage
Friday	Saturday	Sunday
U2; 22:00-23:45; Morrissey; 20:00-21:15; Biffy Clyro; 18:15-19:15; B.B. King; 16:30-17:45; Wu-Tang Clan; 15:00-16:00; Two Door Cinema Club; 13:30-14:30; Metronomy; 12:05-13:00; Master Musicians of Joujouka; 11:00-11:40	Coldplay; 22:15-23:45; Elbow; 20:15-21:30; Paolo Nutini; 18:30-19:30; Tinie Tempah; 17:00-18:00; Rumer; 15:30-16:20; The Gaslight Anthem; 13:45-14:45; Tame Impala; 12:15-13:15; Stornoway; 11:00-11:45	Beyoncé; 21:45-23:15; Pendulum; 19:45-21:00; Plan B 18:15-19:15; Paul Simon; 16:30-17:45; Laura Marling; 15:00-16:00; Don McLean; 13:30-14:30; The Low Anthem; 12:10-13:00; Fisherman's Friends; 11:00-11:45

Other Stage
Friday	Saturday	Sunday
Primal Scream; 22:30-23:45; Mumford and Sons; 20:45-22:00; Fleet Foxes; 19:10-20:15; Bright Eyes; 17:35-18:40; The Wombats; 16:10-17:05; The Vaccines; 14:50-15:40; The Naked and Famous; 13:30-14:20; Brother; 12:15-13:05; Chipmunk; 11:00-11:50	The Chemical Brothers; 22:30-23:45; White Lies; 21:00-22:00; Friendly Fires; 19:30-20:30; Jimmy Eat World; 18:00-19:00; The Kills; 16:30-17:30; Jessie J 15:00-16:00; The Twilight Singers; 13:30-14:30; Treetop Flyers; 12:20-13:00; Alice Gold; 11:00-11:50	Queens of the Stone Age; 22:00-23:15; Kaiser Chiefs; 20:30-21:30; Eels; 19:00-20:00; TV on the Radio; 17:30-18:30; Bombay Bicycle Club; 16:00-17:00; The Noisettes; 14:30-15:30; Cold War Kids; 13:05-14:00; Clare Maguire; 12:00-12:40; Dan Mangan; 11:00-11:35

John Peel Stage
Friday	Saturday	Sunday
DJ Shadow; 22:30-23:45; Example; 21:00-22:00; The Coral; 19:30-20:30; I Am Kloot; 18:10-19:00; Darwin Deez; 16:50-17:40; Cage the Elephant; 15:30-16:20; Miles Kane; 14:15-15:00; Mona; 13:05-13:50; Stonefield; 12:00-12:40; Cocoon; 11:00-11:40	Glasvegas; 22:30-23:45; Battles; 21:00-22:00; Noah and the Whale; 19:30-20:30; The Horrors; 18:10-19:00; Warpaint; 16:50-17:40; Anna Calvi; 15:30-16:20; Dry the River; 14:15-15:00; Yuck; 13:05-13:50; Brave Yesterday; 11:00-11:40	The Streets; 22:05-23:15; Robyn; 20:35-21:35; Hurts; 19:05-20:05; The Vaccines; 17:45-18:35; Everything Everything; 16:30-17:15; OK Go; 15:10-16:00; The Joy Formidable; 14:00-14:45; Foster the People; 13:00-13:45; The Raghu Dixit Project; 12:00-12:40; My Tiger My Timing; 11:00-11:40

The Park Stage
Friday	Saturday	Sunday
Crystal Castles; 23:15-00:15; Caribou; 21:45-22:45; Radiohead (special guests); 20:00-21:15; Big Audio Dynamite; 18:15-19:15; Warpaint; 16:45-17:45; Jenny and Johnny; 15:30-16:25; Caitlin Rose; 14:15-15:00; Dylan LeBlanc; 13:00-13:45; Grouplove; 12:00-12:35; Narisarato; 11:00-11:30	Wild Beasts; 23:00-00:15; James Blake; 21:30-22:30; Pulp (special guests); 19:45-21:00; Tame Impala; 18:15-19:15; The Walkmen; 16:45-17:45; Graham Coxon; 15:30-16:15; Those Dancing Days; 14:15-15:00; About Group; 13:00-13:45; Balearic Folk Orchestra; 12:00-12:30; Ellen and the Escapades; 11:00-11:30	Gruff Rhys; 21:30-22:45; Lykke Li; 20:00-21:00; John Grant; 18:30-19:30; The Bees; 17:00-18:00; James Vincent McMorrow; 15:45-16:30; Jonny; 14:30-15:15; Sea of Bees; 13:30-14:00; The Pierces; 12:30-13:00; Troy Ellis & Hail Jamaica; 11:30-12:00

East Dance
Friday	Saturday	Sunday
Fatboy Slim; 23:15-00:30; Fatboy vs. Carl Cox; 22:15-23:15; Carl Cox; 21:00-22:15; Ke$ha; 20:00-21:00; The Midnight Beast; 18:30-19:30; Katy B 17:00-18:00; Fenech-Soler; 15:50-16:35; Mike Posner; 14:50-15:30; Beardyman; 13:30-14:30; Terror Danjah presents Hardrive; 12:30-13:30; DJ Baby Malc - DJ and Compère; 11:30-12:30	Professor Green; 23:30-00:30; Devlin; 22:10-23:00; Labrinth; 21:10-21:50; Wretch 32; 20:20-20:50; Skepta; 19:20-20:00; MistaJam (DJ set); 18:20-19:20; Giggs; 17:30-18:00; Jodie Connor; 16:40-17:10; Yasmin; 15:50-16:20; Mz Bratt; 15:00-15:30; P-Money; 14:10-14:40; Griminal; 13:20-13:50; RoxXXan; 12:30-13:00; Comperes MistaJam and DJ Cameo	Pete Tong (DJ Set); 22:30-00:00; The Japanese Popstars; 21:15-22:00; Steve Lawler (DJ Set); 20:00-21:15; Claude VonStroke (DJ Set); 18:45-20:00; Azari and 111; 17:45-18:45; DJ Shepdog (DJ Set); 17:15-17:45; NZ Shapeshifter; 16:00-17:15; DJ Shepdog (DJ Set); 15:30-16:00; Funkagenda and Chris Lake B2B; 14:00-15:30; Mark Knight (DJ Set); 13:00-14:00; Matt Hardwick; 11:45-13:00

West Holts
Friday	Saturday	Sunday
Cee Lo Green; Chase & Status; Heliocentrics with Mulatu; Jimmy Cliff; Little Dragon; Gonjasufi; Dengue Fever; Ziriguidum	Big Boi; Janelle Monáe; Aloe Blacc; Fool's Gold; Omar Souleyman; Brandt Brauer Frick; Nicolas Jaar; Narasirato; London Afrobeat Collective	Kool & the Gang; Hercules and Love Affair; The Go! Team; Duane Eddy; Bellowhead; Jah Wobble and the Nippon dub Ensemble; Jamie Woon; Hidden Orchestra

== BBC Introducing stage ==
The BBC curate a stage at Glastonbury each year showcasing new talent. This year saw performances from Ed Sheeran, F-Block, The Good Natured, Jake Bugg, Sharks Took the Rest, Vessels and George Ezra, amongst others.

== Spirit of '71 stage (Anniversary Pyramid Stage) ==
Andrew Kerr, who with Arabella Churchill, put on the 1971 Glastonbury Fayre, curated a "Sprit of '71" Anniversary Pyramid Stage in celebration of the 40th anniversary of the 1971 festival. Marsupilami, The Edgar Broughton Band, Mike Oldfield, Steve Hillage, Arthur Brown, Nick Lowe, Noel Harrison, Nik Turner, Nigel Mazlyn Jones and Mick Farren all appeared.

== Secret gigs ==
Secret gigs on the Park Stage saw Radiohead (Friday) and Pulp (Saturday) perform to large crowds.

== Weather ==
The gates opened on Wednesday to rain and heavy showers persisted making the car parks and the festival site a muddy terrain. Dry conditions on the Friday soon made way for yet more rain early afternoon and didn't stop until the Saturday lunchtime. Sunday was non stop sunshine which dried out the site.

== Records ==
The 2011 festival also broke two television viewing records. Firstly, 18.6 million viewers tuned in from their own homes throughout the festival. A new record for the BBC. Ratings declined by over 1 million from the 2009 to 2010 festival due to the Fifa World Cup and hot weather. The 2011 Festival saw "plenty of rain and a very muddy Glastonbury", causing ratings to climb over 3 million views from the 2010 to 2011 festival.

Also, headliner Beyoncé's performance, which acted as the finale act to the festival, generated over 2.6 million views individually, breaking the record for most television views for a single performance according to the BBC.
