= Whitelake River =

River in Somerset, England

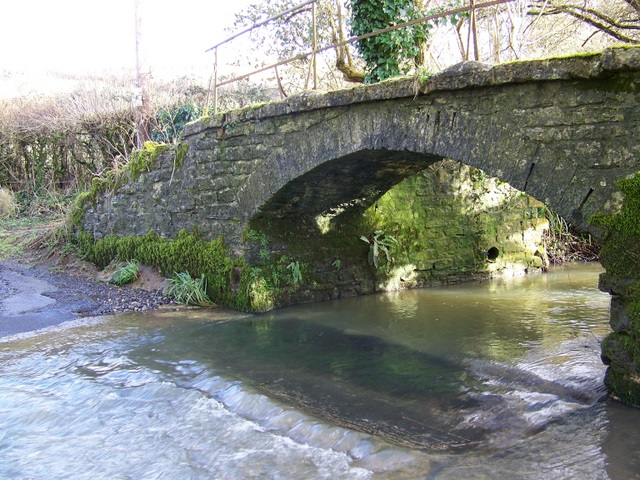
- Cockmill Bridge and ford

Location
- Country: England
- State: Somerset

Physical characteristics
- Source
  - location: Pylle
  - coordinates: 51°08′30″N 2°33′47″W
- 2nd source
  - location: Beard Hill
  - coordinates: 51°09′43″N 2°32′28″W
- 3rd source
  - location: Worthy Farm, Pilton
  - coordinates: 51°09′21″N 2°35′24″W
- Mouth: River Brue
  - location: Westhay, Somerset, England
  - coordinates: 51°10′47″N 2°47′41″W
- Length: 10 km (6.2 mi)

The Whitelake River is a small river on the Somerset Levels, England.

The river rises between two low limestone ridges, part of the southern edge of the Mendip Hills. The confluence of the two small streams that make the Whitelake River is on Worthy Farm (which is the site of the Glastonbury Festival) between the small villages of Pilton and Pylle. It flows west for approximately 10 kilometres (6.2 mi) until it joins the River Brue at Westhay. The Witelake was once navigable between Pilton and the confluence with the Brue. In the 1st millennium BC the land close to the confluence of Whitelake River and the Brue was the site of the Meare Pool, which was located on low-lying levels just north of Meare.

During 2010 Michael Eavis received a donation from British Waterways of timber from the old gates at Caen Hill Locks in Wiltshire. This was used to construct a new bridge over the Whitelake River which was dedicated to the memory of Arabella Churchill and named "Bella's Bridge".

Water from the river was sampled both upstream and downstream of Worthy Farm before, during and after the 2019 Glastonbury Festival. Concentrations of the illegal drugs MDMA and cocaine from festival-goers urinating in the open fields were high enough to harm aquatic wildlife, including a rare population of the European eel, a protected species.
