= Royal Bath and West of England Society =

British charitable organization

Coordinates: 51°09′25″N 2°31′35″W

Crest of the Royal Bath and West of England Society

The Royal Bath and West of England Society is a charitable society founded in 1777 to promote and improve agriculture and related activities around the West Country of England. Based at the Royal Bath and West of England Society Showground near Shepton Mallet in Somerset, the society is a registered charity in England and Wales (no. 1039397).

Nowadays the society offers a variety of services relating to agriculture and veterinary science including public and professional events, seminars and advice, scholarships, and a marketplace for countryside products.

== History ==
In 1775 Edmund Rack, a draper, moved from his native Norfolk to the city of Bath. He was struck on his arrival by the poor standard of agricultural practice in the West Country, and in a series of letters to the Farmer's Magazine and the Bath Chronicle he argued that it was in the interest of all involved to make a concerted effort to improve productivity. Thus on 28 August 1777 the Bath Chronicle printed a notice addressed to "The Nobility and Gentry in the counties of Somerset, Gloucester, Wiltshire and Dorset in general, and the Cities of Bath and Bristol in particular". This notice, paid for by Rack, proposed the formation of a "Society in this City, for the encouragement of Agriculture, Planting, Manufactures, Commerce, and the Fine Arts...".

A number of philanthropists responded, and at a meeting on 8 September inaugurated the Bath and West of England Society for the Encouragement of Agriculture, Arts, Manufactures and Commerce, nominating Rack as the society's secretary. The same year, the Aims, Rules and Orders of the Society were published, which set out the activities of the society for the years to come. These involved the improvement of areas such as animal husbandry, farm implements and country crafts through education, experimentation and prize-giving.

In 1780 a site at Weston, Bath was taken over for use by the society as an experimental farm. Although this particular venture ended around a decade later, for the next 196 years the society's headquarters were located in properties within the city of Bath, until in 1974 its administration moved to a new permanent home in Shepton Mallet.

The year 1780 saw the first major publication of the society when Volume I of the Letters and Papers appeared. These disseminated advice and scientific opinion on agriculture and other subjects of interest. They were printed at irregular intervals, finishing with Volume XV in 1829. Later the society resumed publishing with a full journal.

In 1859 it was decided to move the annual meetings of the society out of the city of Bath, and to convene each year in a different town in the society's area. These meetings were supplemented by annual agricultural shows which proved enormously popular, and continue to the present day.

In 1869 the society was then renamed as the 'Bath and West of England Society and Southern Counties Association for the Encouragement of Agriculture, Arts, Manufactures, and Commerce' to reflect its influence in areas outside the vicinity of the city. There were further name changes in the 1890s, finishing with the 'Bath and West and Southern Counties Society'.

A final change of name created the present 'Royal Bath and West of England Society', and in 1994 the society was registered as a full charity under British law. The society continues to organise events around the west of England, including a flower show and the Royal Bath and West Show, which in 2005 attracted 150,000 visitors. The current president of the society is HRH The Countess of Wessex.

== Showground ==
The Royal Bath and West Showground is the location for many events throughout the year, including the New Wine summer conferences.

The first Glastonbury festival at Worthy Farm was the Pop, Blues & Folk Festival, hosted by Michael Eavis on Saturday 19 September 1970. Eavis decided to host the first festival after seeing an open-air concert headlined by Led Zeppelin at the 1970 Bath Festival of Blues and Progressive Music at nearby Bath and West Showground in 1970.

== See also ==
- John Billingsley (agriculturist) – one of the founders of the Bath and West Society
