= Glastonbury Festival 1982 =

Music festival in England

- Locations: Worthy Farm, Pilton, Somerset, England
- Previous event: Glastonbury Festival 1981
- Next event: Glastonbury Festival 1983

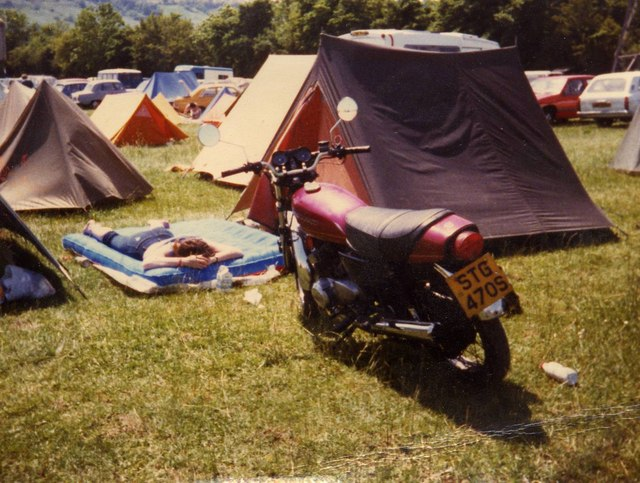
Glastonbury June 1982

Glastonbury CND Festival 1982 saw the 25,000 crowd pay £8 for a ticket. Performances included Van Morrison, Judie Tzuke, Jackson Browne, Roy Harper and Richie Havens, however U2 did not perform as advertised. The highest rainfall for a single day in 45 years was recorded on the Friday and contributed to a muddy Glastonbury.

In 1982, Richie Havens appeared at the UK's Glastonbury Festival, closing the show on the Sunday night.

== Performers ==
The Line-up included:

- Aswad
- Jackson Browne
- Roy Harper
- Van Morrison
- Judie Tzuke
- Randy California
- The Blues Band
- Richie Havens
- Sad Café
- Black Uhuru
- The Chieftains
- Funkapolitan
- A Certain Ratio
- John Cooper Clarke
- Jean-Philippe Rykiel and Didier Malherbe plus members of Mother Gong
- Talisman
- Osibisa
- Climax Blues Band
- Ekome
- Steve Wally

Various artists were filmed for in-concert films that were later shown on UK TV. Broadcasts are confirmed for the Roy Harper Band, Randy California, Sad Café, and Osibisa.
