= Bill Harkin =

Petorian architect (1938–2021)

William Harkin (1938 – March 2021) was a British architect and stage designer. Born in Liverpool he studied art and architecture there before embarking on a career in stage design. In 1970 he chanced upon Andrew Kerr while walking on Glastonbury Tor. The pair decided to hold a music festival and secured the agreement of Michael Eavis to hold the 1971 Glastonbury Fair, which later became the Glastonbury Festival. Harkin was responsible for designing the first Pyramid Stage, which became emblematic of the festival. Afterwards he carried out work for the Eden Project and taught at the Wimbledon College of Art.

== Early life and career ==
Harkin was born in Liverpool 1938 and grew up in the city where he attended Beatles gigs at The Cavern. He studied art (painting and 3D construction) at the Liverpool College of Art on Hope Street and exhibited works at the Liverpool Academy of Arts.

Harkin went on to study architecture but became fed up of coursework and left to enter the workplace as a set designer. He designed lighting set-ups and stages for concerts at the Bluecoat Arts Centre and, later, for Paul McCartney and the Rolling Stones. By 1970 Harkin was designing car launches for British Leyland.

== Glastonbury ==
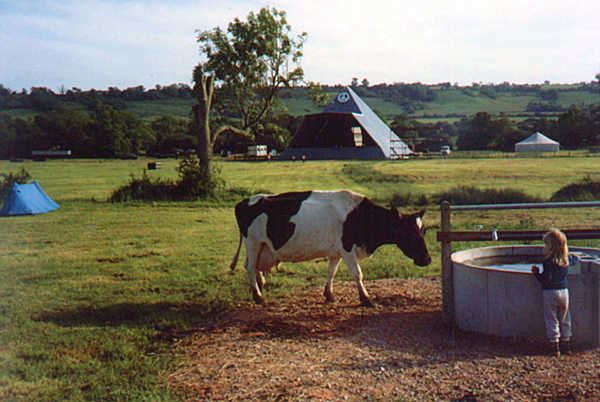
The Pyramid Stage in 1983

Late in 1970 Harkin was delivering products to health food shops in Glastonbury. He decided to walk up Glastonbury Tor and there met Andrew Kerr. The pair had a discussion about spirituality and utopian ideals and decided that a music concert would promote this. Harkin and Kerr approached local farmer Michael Eavis, who had hosted the Pop, Blues & Folk Festival on his Worthy Farm at nearby Pilton, Somerset, to discuss a festival to be held in 1971. Eavis was impressed by Harkin's enthusiasm and agreed to host the first Glastonbury Fair (now the Glastonbury Festival).

Harkin designed the festival's centrepiece, the Pyramid Stage. He claimed the vision of the stage came to him in a dream, where he imagined himself on stage with a pyramid before him formed from two beams of light. Upon waking Harkin took the morning off work and sketched up the outline of the design. The structure, which took three months to build, was constructed of scaffolding and plastic sheeting, purchased from Taunton cattle market. The Pyramid Stage has since become synonymous with the festival. It was upgraded in 1981 and burnt down in 1994. It returned in 2000 as a permanent structure, four times the size of Harkin's original but still based on a pyramid shape.

== Later life ==
After Glastonbury Harkin established his own architecture and events business and carried out works for the Eden Project. He also taught at the Wimbledon College of Art. Harkin died, aged 83, on the weekend of 6/7 March 2021. Eavis paid tribute to him for leading an "inspirational life" and said he was "simply loved by us all".
