= Worthy FM =

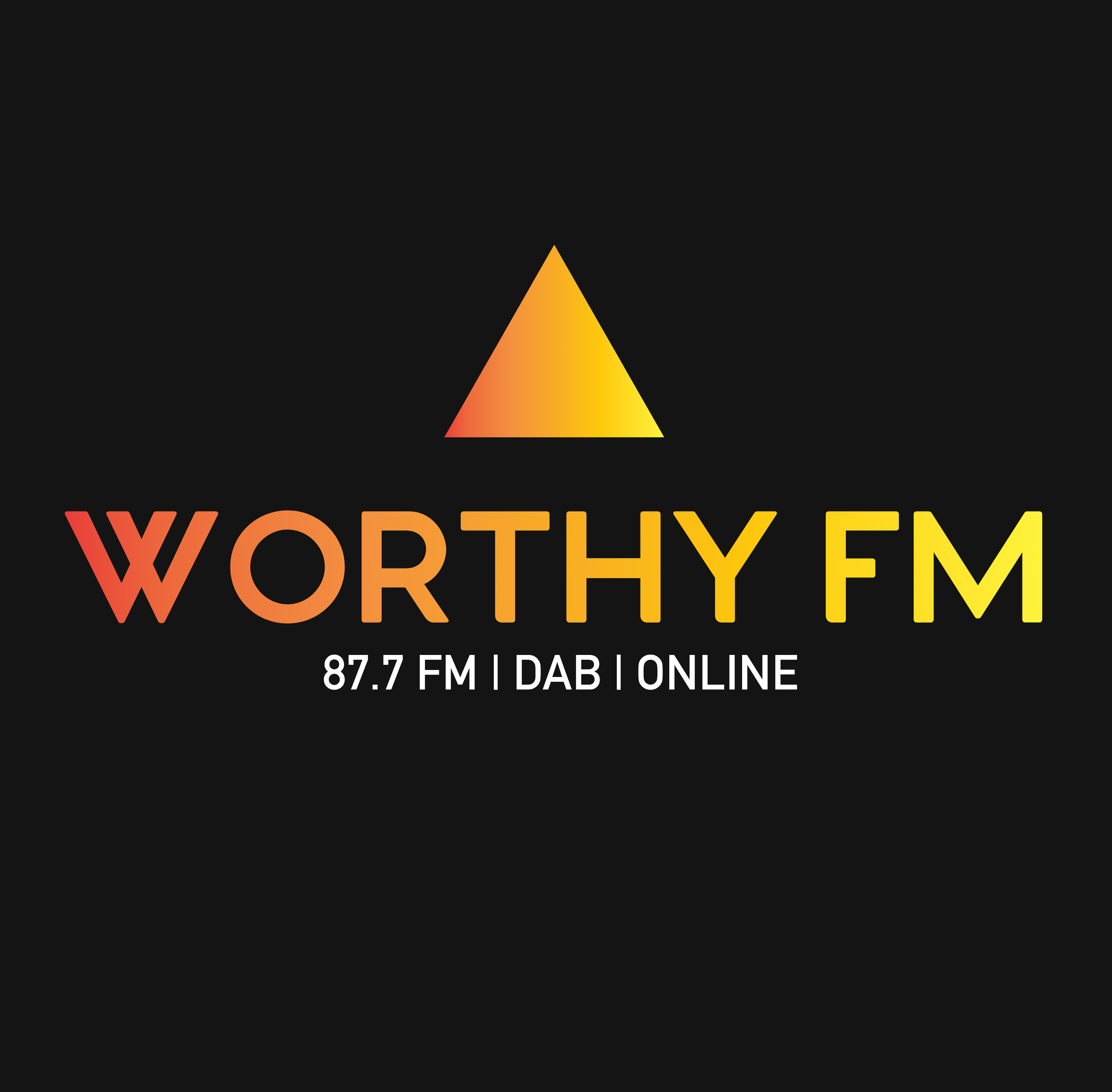
- United Kingdom
- Frequency: 87.7 MHz

History
- First air date: 2007

Technical information
- Transmitter coordinates: 51.1584°N 2.5802°W

Links
- Website: www.worthyfm.com twitter.com/worthyfm www.facebook.com/worthyfm

Worthy FM is the onsite radio station of The Glastonbury Festival. It broadcasts on 87.7 MHz FM and online for one week only during the Festival, operating under a Restricted Service Licence (RSL). The station features interviews and music from across the entire festival site, promoting the festival's good causes, as well as providing important information on traffic congestion, camping availability and any lineup changes. The station caters for members of the public as they arrive at, stay at and leave the festival site, as well as the many crew members on site, and those who listening at home who cannot attend the festival that year.

The station is run by a team of 30 volunteers, many of whom have been working on the station for a number of years. In addition, the station reserves a number of crew places each year for new volunteers, who are chosen through a national competition judged by festival organiser Emily Eavis.

== Programming ==
Worthy FM broadcasts from the Saturday before the festival opens to the following Monday when the festival closes. One of its main functions on-site is to provide news and information for people attending the festival. Throughout the week, the station broadcasts regular news bulletins, containing information on traffic around the site, space availability in the campsites, what to bring to the festival and anything else festival goers need to know to make the most of their time on site.

The station broadcasts 24 hours a day, and features a range of different shows and presenters. The shows mix discussion and music with features recorded around the festival site. The station also actively encourages listener participation through SMS and social media. The station's longest running show is Daddy Teacha's Reggae Show, which previously appeared on Radio Avalon before Worthy FM.

Worthy FM always features the finalists of the Festival's Emerging Talent Competition, inviting them up to the studio for interviews and live performances.

== History ==
Worthy FM was launched in 2007 to replace the festival's previous onsite station, Radio Avalon. The name Worthy FM was chosen by festival organiser Michael Eavis and is named after Worthy Farm, Eavis' farm and the home of the festival.

=== 2007 ===
Worthy FM started life in the same location as its predecessor, Radio Avalon, on the upper western edge of Big Ground field, near Worthy Farm. It featured a number of different presenters and shows, many focussing in on one particular aspect of the festival, such as its emerging talent competition and the Elemental tent. Many guests came to the station to perform on its outdoor stage, including Bible Code Sundays, Small White Light, The Beathovens and Bluebird Kid Clark, whilst interviews included Michael Eavis, Damian Marley, Paul Weller, Seasick Steve, The Proclaimers and Bob Wilson from Greenpeace

=== 2008 ===
2008 saw Worthy FM return for its second year, again with an outdoor Wireless Stage open to members of the public. The stage featured performances from The Levellers, The Bluetones, Martha Wainwright, Ron Sexsmith and Seth Lakeman, as well as interviews with Katy Melua, Daddy Freddy and Gilbert O'Sullivan whilst pre-recorded features covered she-pees, solar showers and 'green' tent pegs.

=== 2009 ===
In 2009, the Worthy FM compound was moved to the top edge of Big Ground field, closer to Worthy Farm. This placed it behind a security cordon for the first time, meaning members of the public could no longer walk up to the station itself. The station's live performances returned to being fully acoustic, and featured appearances from guests such as Stornoway, The Travelling Band and Atilla the Stockbroker. Interviewees that year included Lady Gaga, Florence and the Machine, Marcus Brigstocke, Madness, Horace Andy, Steel Pulse, Status Quo and Nick Clegg. Dreadzone claimed to have performed their first ever acoustic set live on the station that year.

=== 2010 ===
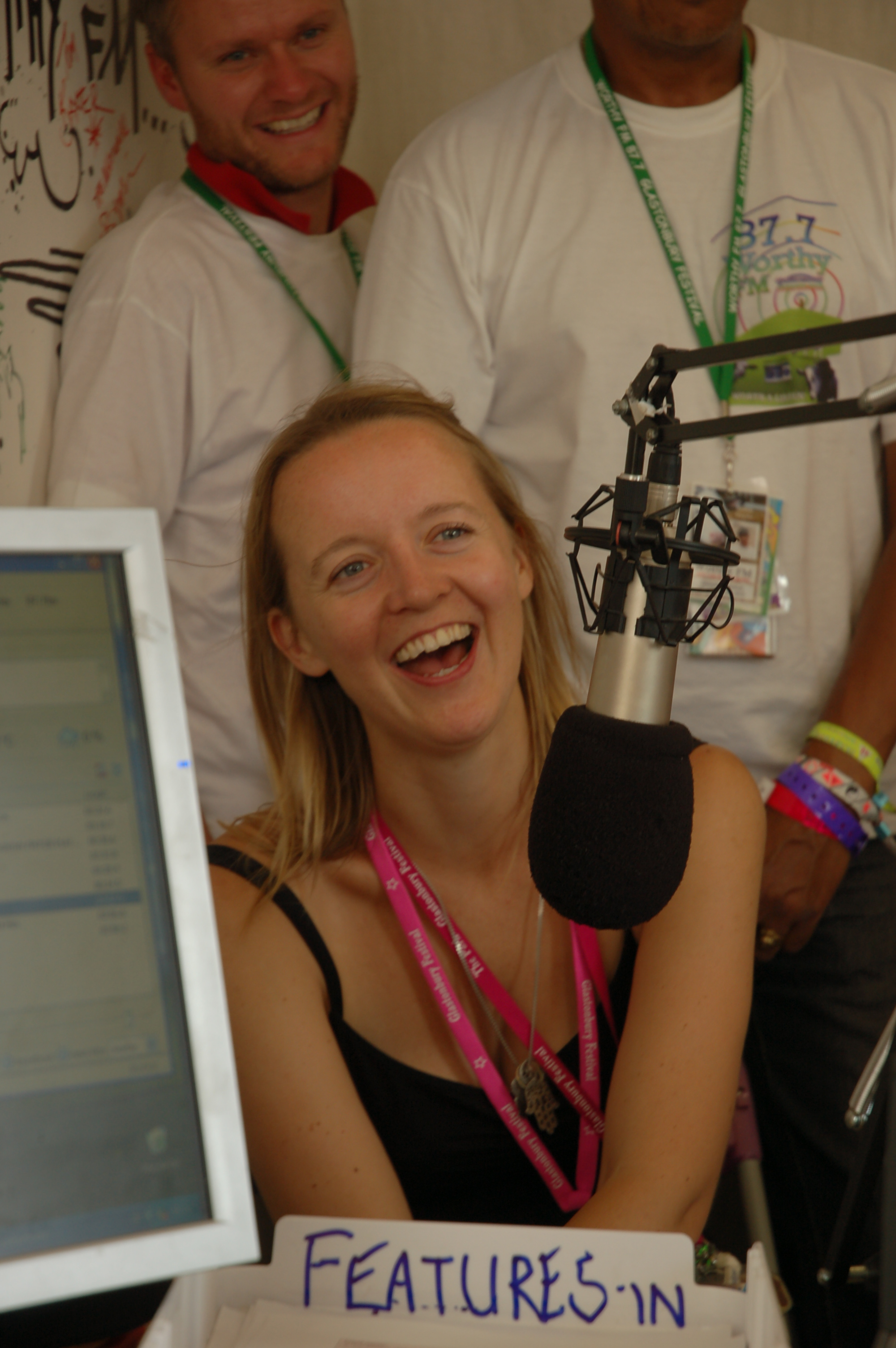
Emily Eavis being interviewed

Glastonbury 2010 was the 40th anniversary of Glastonbury Festival, and much of the station's content reflected this, with shows covering various aspects of the Festival's history. The festival also linked up with BBC Radio 6 Music on-site, with Worthy FM crew co-presenting shows on 6 Music with the likes of Lauren Laverne and Steve Lamacq. Guests interviewed that year included Damon Albarn, Scissor Sisters, Tinchy Stryder, Toots Hibbert, Billy Bragg, Gentleman's Dub Club and Tony Benn.

=== 2011 ===
Guests and interviewees this year included Fatboy Slim, Big Boi, Noah and the Whale, Will Young, Pixie Geldof and Guy Garvey. The station also introduced a dedicated Kids' Show, focussing on the Kidzfield section of the site, and presented by two children under 10. The Kids Show also featured the station's first marriage proposal live on air, which happily resulted in an engagement. With the introduction of a one way system to access the south-east corner of the site at night, Worthy FM also carried regular updates on queuing times and alternative things to do for those not wishing to queue.

=== 2012 ===
There was no Glastonbury Festival in 2012, so Worthy FM took a year off. Taking advantage of this break, the station arranged a fact finding crew swap with BMIR, the official onsite radio station of the Burning Man Festival, Nevada, USA

=== 2013 ===
Worthy FM commenced broadcasting for the 2013 festival on the morning of Monday 24 June. This year, the station has a second studio located in a public area in Arcadia, inspired by the 2012 Burning Man exchange visit. This enabled the public to walk straight into live broadcasts and appear on air themselves. Guests and interviews this year included Mumford & Sons, John Lydon, The Orb, Bruce Forsyth, Liam Gallagher, Portishead, Bill Wyman, The Congos and Bez.

=== 2022 ===
After two forced cancellations of the festival due to COVID-19, Worthy FM returned in the 2020s, broadcasting two day earlier than usual on the Saturday prior to the festival, and also for the first time on Digital Audio Broadcasting in the Somerset area.

=== 2023 ===
Sticking with tradition, in 2023, Worthy FM broadcast live 24 hours a day from Saturday 17 June at midday, to midnight on Monday 26 June. In addition to music, the station broadcast traffic and travel, news and information on what's going on around the site, along with a host of stories.

=== 2024 ===
In 2024, Worthy FM broadcast live 24 hours a day from the morning of Monday 24 June, to the end of Monday 1 July. 2024 also brought the launch of the Vodafone x Glastonbury mobile app.
