= Glastonbury 1978 =

Music festival in England

- Locations: Worthy Farm, Pilton, Somerset, England
- Previous event: Glastonbury 1971
- Next event: Glastonbury 1979

Glastonbury 1978 became known as the “impromptu” Festival. There was a small unplanned event in 1978, when a convoy of vehicles from the Stonehenge festival was directed by police to Worthy Farm.

The travellers believed that a festival was taking place and indeed a free mini Festival did take place with little organisation, few facilities land the stage powered through an electric meter in a caravan.

The line-up included Nik Turner's Sphynx; Nice n Easy; White Island; Pedro; Motivation and Tribe.
