= Glastonbury Festival 1984 =

Music festival in England

- Locations: Worthy Farm, Pilton, Somerset, England
- Previous event: Glastonbury Festival 1983
- Next event: Glastonbury Festival 1985

Glastonbury CND Festival 1984 saw 35,000 attendees paying £13 entrance.

The stage invaded by fans during The Smiths' set. Weather Report played the main stage, and Elvis Costello headlined the last night for almost three hours.

Amazulu were scheduled to be the opening act on the Pyramid Stage on the Saturday, but did not arrive in time. They were subsequently given a slot before General Public, necessitating The Smiths to take the stage earlier than scheduled. Elvis Costello And The Attractions were not announced as Saturday's headliners until a few days before the festival started, and too late to be credited in the official programme. Ian Dury was backed by his then current band, The Music Students.

== Pyramid stage ==
Friday	Saturday	Sunday
Dr John; Ian Dury; Black Uhuru; Joan Baez; Hank Wangford; Billy Bragg	Elvis Costello And The Attractions; General Public; Amazulu; The Smiths; Brass Construction; Paul Brady; The Waterboys	Fela Kuti; Weather Report; Fairport Convention; John Martyn
