= Arabella Churchill =

Arabella Churchill may refer to:

- Arabella Churchill (royal mistress) (1648–1730), mistress of King James II of England and VII of Scotland
- Arabella Churchill (charity founder) (1949–2007), founder of the charity Children's World
