= Radio Avalon =

Radio Avalon was a pirate radio station set up at the Glastonbury Festival near Glastonbury, England, in 1983. It later became a legally recognised station. In 2007, Radio Avalon was replaced with Worthy FM.

== The beginning ==
The idea of launching a radio station at the Glastonbury Festival was coined at the festival in 1982 by Lawrie Hallett and Norman McLeod. Radio Avalon was launched the next year (1983) operating from a tent and a red VW camper van. Norman McLeod and Lawrie Hallett were joined by Alan Brown, Paul Garner and others. The crew in these early years came from Wireless Workshop in Brighton, Phoenix Communications in London and Sheffield Peace Radio. The transmission equipment used was built by the members and much of the outboard equipment came from the founders' domestic hi-fi, reflecting the DIY ethic that characterised much of the Radio Avalon approach for several years. At this time, the station's programme was a very free format, with one show flowing into another depending on which crew member was available and who wanted to do a show. For several years, these pioneering broadcasts came from a tent near to Goose Hall and the signal very occasionally made it as far as Glastonbury town, a distance of 5 miles away. The presenters from midnight to daybreak were known as "The Dead Heads"—they played mainly Grateful Dead records mixed with other late night tracks. By the mid-1980s the team was joined by a number of volunteers from Ireland and in particular from Bray Local Broadcasting. A regular feature of these early broadcasts were various outside broadcasts from backstage and or from the top of Glastonbury Tor, looking down across the festival site just visible several miles away.

Radio Avalon remained a pirate radio station for the first 7 years of its life. It was always the aim of its members that it would become a legal broadcaster and following changes to government legislation in 1988 and again in 1991, Radio Avalon applied for and was awarded a Restricted Service Licence (RSL).

== Middle years ==
By 1992, the station had become a legal and recognised RSL station. The station had a loose format, with named presenters doing regular shows. Over the years, many guest presenters have huddled inside the Radio Avalon cabin, situated near the farmhouse at the top of Big Ground; such names include BBC Radio 2's Janice Long, Radiohead and a programme in 1995 hosted by John Peel. After a classic three night tenure from The Orb in 1992, the night-time sessions were steered in a more dance and ambient orientated direction.

In 1992 In-ter-dance were asked to provide DJ's for the dance shows, they were also asked to help locate a printer to print, at short notice, a flyer, with the lineups on.

This task fell to Jamie 2K @ Power Leaflets, who, along with Mensa, (and others), sponsored this years radio station.

== Later years ==
Radio Avalon continued to gain new support throughout the 1990s. The station became fully self funding, having relied in the early years on support from the Glastonbury Festival organisation. Radio Avalon now played host to a new generation of younger broadcasters who saw the station as a great opportunity to be heard. It was sponsored by various organisations and gained support from record labels and emerging dot com companies. The new century saw divisions begin to assert themselves within the membership. Following the death of Fred Williams in 2004, station manager since 1992, an internal struggle arose that resulted in personnel changes.

=== 2002 ===
Radio Avalon returned after a year off with some new personnel and a fresh relationship with the festival. A year off gave impetus to the year's broadcasts, with an aerobics session for the radio, live from the roof of the main studio.

=== 2003 ===
The station built on previous successful years and made the most of a dry festival. Artists that visited the station including Glenn Tilbrook, Simon Friend of The Levellers among others.

=== 2004 ===
Radio Avalon celebrated 21 years of broadcasting to the Glastonbury Festival in 2004. As car drivers neared the site they tuned their radio to 87.7 MHz FM, and received all the festival information they could want (including essential details for drivers on the state of the roads, gates, car parks, camping fields and where to pitch their tents).

The festival station brought accurate and useful festival information throughout the day as well as talking to festival goers, performers and workers alike, profiling every aspect of the festival. Presenters Marilyn Michaels & Daddy Teacha enjoyed an exclusive interview with the legendary James Brown. They played the best music from every area and hosted exclusive live performances by some of the biggest artists on-site, from their very own Wireless Stage including Damien Rice, Michael Franti, Dr Hook's Dennis LeCorriere, Suzanne Vega and Hazel O'Connor amongst many more.

In 2004 Radio Avalon made a welcome return to the Greenfields area with a dedicated solar powered studio centrally based in the Green Futures field. They hosted a regular hour-long show every day showcasing some of the entrants of the Festival's unsigned bands competition. At lunchtimes they delved deep into the archives to celebrate 21 years of festival broadcasting, bringing all the best bits from shows such as "The Pilton Breakfast Show", including a tribute to station manager Fred Williams, who had died in April. There was also regular news and travel updates keeping listeners informed, including regular welfare announcements and festival advice.

=== 2005 ===
Broadcasting from two studios at the Glastonbury Festival, one at the Greenfields area and the other at the top of the hill near the main farmhouse, Radio Avalon was kept busy as torrential rains and flash floods made its broadcasts a vital part of the official festival information network. Thousands of festival goers tuned in for updates on weather conditions, traffic redirection, changes to performance times (as stages dried out) and to learn which campsites were less muddy than others. Once the sun came back out, The Wireless Stage was a great success, broadcasting live acoustic sets performed by the finalists of the festival's Best Unsigned Bands competition from small stages set up alongside the broadcast studios.

=== 2007 ===
In 2007, Radio Avalon was replaced with Worthy FM.
