= Arabella Churchill (charity founder) =

English festival co-founder (1949–2007)

Arabella Spencer-Churchill
- Churchill in 1967
- Born: 30 October 1949; London, UK
- Died: 20 December 2007 (aged 58); Glastonbury, Somerset, England
- Known for: Charity founder, festival co-founder, fundraiser
- Children: 2
- Parent(s): Randolph Churchill; June Osborne
- Relatives: Winston Churchill (grandfather); Clementine Churchill (grandmother); Winston Churchill (half-brother)

Arabella Spencer-Churchill (Note: This British person has the barrelled surname Spencer-Churchill, but is known by the surname Churchill.) (30 October 1949 – 20 December 2007) was an English charity founder, festival co-founder and fundraiser. Rarely giving interviews, she was a focus of press attention as the granddaughter of British Prime Minister Winston Churchill.

In 1971, Churchill played a major role in the development of the Glastonbury Festival. In 1979, she set up the children's area of the festival and also the theatre area. Until her death, she ran the theatre and circus fields. Her duties in the 2007 festival involved the booking and management of some 1500 separate acts. She also founded and was the director of the Children's World charity.

== Early life ==
Churchill was born in London to Randolph Churchill (son of Sir Winston Churchill) and his second wife June Osborne (daughter of Colonel Rex Hamilton Osborne), and was half-sister to Winston Churchill, who was born to Randolph Churchill and his first wife Pamela Beryl Digby, better known as Pamela Harriman. Her parents divorced in 1961.

She appeared, at the age of two, in the portrait of Winston Churchill and his family which hangs in the National Portrait Gallery (said to have been his favourite granddaughter, she was to frequently visit her grandfather at Chartwell and during his final illness in January 1965 regularly called to his house in London) In March 1954, then four-year-old Churchill appeared on the cover of Life as part of a feature on possible future spouses of then five-year-old Prince Charles.

She went to Fritham School for Girls, where she was Head Girl, and then Ladymede school, near Aylesbury, Buckinghamshire. In 1967 she was "Debutante of the Year", appeared in January UK Vogue feature "Youthquakers Face '67" photographed by Norman Parkinson.

== Charity, Dissent and Glastonbury ==
While working as public relations trainee for the international leprosy charity Lepra, in 1969 she helped organise a charity ball at Kensington Town Hall, London for the starving children in war- and famine-struck Biafra. In 1970, a year in which reports had her romantically linked with Crown Prince Carl, the future King Carl XVI Gustaf of Sweden, she toured leper colonies in Tanzania and Zambia.

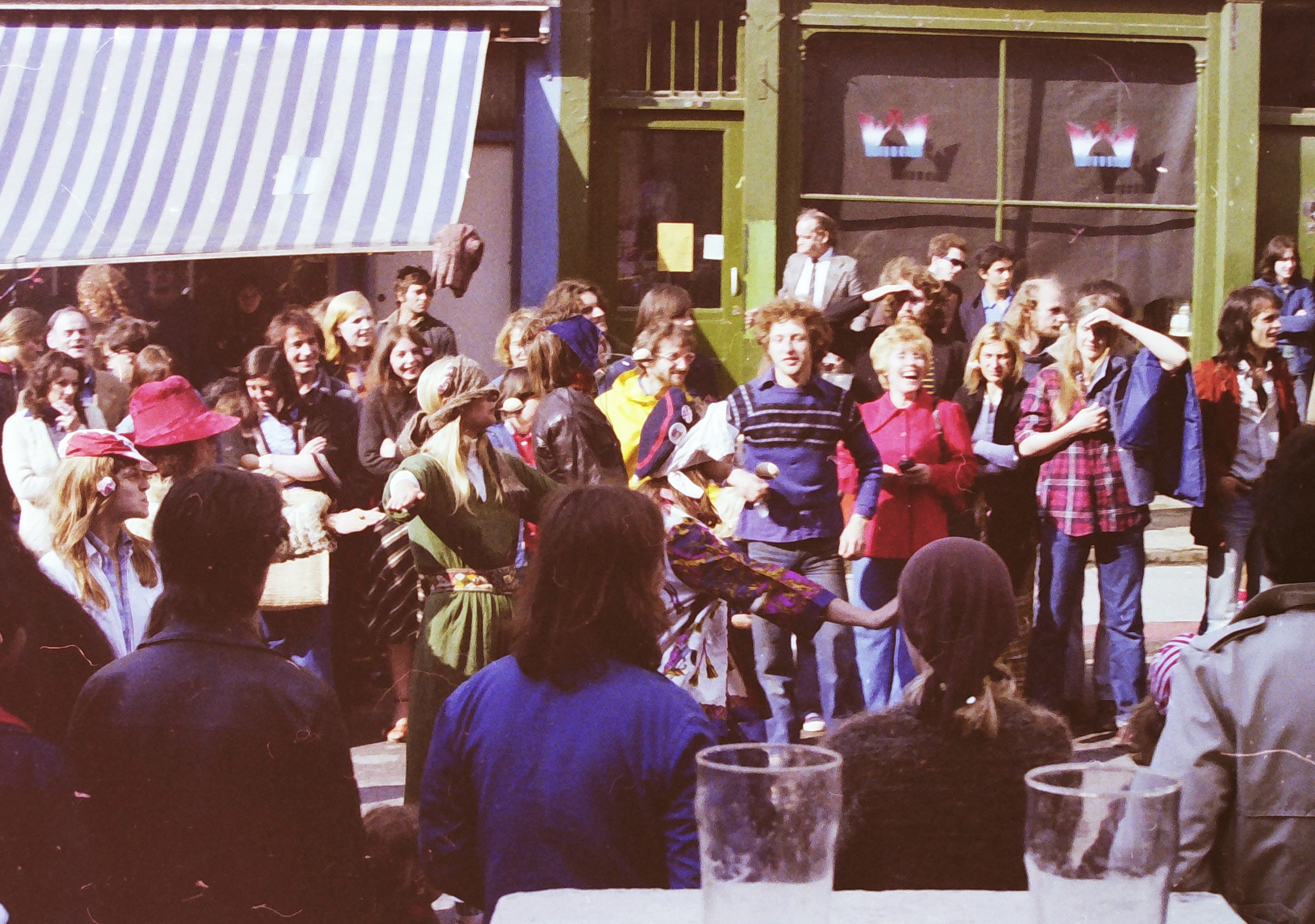
Arabella Churchill in a blindfold game during a Queens Silver Jubilee street party in Bristol Gardens, London, the squatted street in which she ran a kitchen called the "Nutshell", 7 June 1977.

In 1971, Churchill declined an invitation to be Britain's "Azalea Queen" at the Norfolk NATO Festival, Virginia. In doing so, she made public her opposition to the Vietnam War. To the organisers she wrote: "My grandfather used the phrase 'The Iron Curtain'. It seems to be that what is facing us all now is the final curtain. The defence systems of the great powers are mutually infectious". Her family were not understanding: "My mother was saying: 'Darling, can't I just say you've had a nervous breakdown?'" "The whole thing", she recalled, "was a nightmare. I felt I had let the family down. I felt I wanted to be a hippy, I felt I was Left-wing, I didn't feel like the rest of my family". She granted an interview to Rolling Stone, for what was to have been a series "The British Aristocracy is Revolting", in which she declared the wish to "do something more with her life than that which was expected of her by her family and the British Class System".

Chased through London by "a surprised press", she took refuge with her father’s former literary assistant, Andrew Kerr, at Worthy Farm at Pilton, Somerset. With the farmer (and CND campaigner), Michael Eavis, Kerr was planning to stage "a free summer festival with 'cosmic significance' in one of the fields". After re-directing £4,000 of family resources to, among other things, purchase materials for Bill Harkin’s "visionary Pyramid Stage", Churchill helped them stage the first full-scale incarnation of the Glastonbury Festival. Eavis recalls: "12,000 people turned up for five days of music, dance, poetry, theatre and entertainment during which Hawkwind, David Bowie, Joan Baez and Fairport Convention gave performances".

After the festival, in late 1971, she was said to have "dropped out of sight" in a commune outside London. In the mid-1970s, she was living with her son Jake (born 1973) in a squatted street in London's Maida Vale, Bristol Gardens, where she ran a small kitchen restaurant. In a radio interview in 1976, she explained that the house, owned by the Greater London Council, had been empty for 5 years, and that in advance of the street being redeveloped, she was paying rates. The community, she said, was "one place where I have been accepted and not thought of as a Churchill”. (In an interview months before her death in 2007, she told The Independent that while she was "immensely proud of my grandfather", she "was no good at being a Churchill. People never saw me for me. It doesn't do a lot for your confidence").

In 1979, Churchill and Kerr were again in charge of the festival. She established festival's children's area and theatre areas, and ran the circus and cabaret tents. This contributed to her launch, in 1981, of the charity Children’s World dedicated to offering creative, educational and drama workshops for children in the South West. It was to stage the Glastonbury Children’s Festival every summer for more than 30 years. Following 2004 Indian Ocean earthquake and tsunami she went out to Aceh to help supervise the building of houses and to work with children.

In 1972, Churchill married in London a Scottish schoolteacher, Jim Barton, and in 1973, while living on a Welsh sheep farm, they had a son, Nicholas Jake Gompo Barton. In 1987 she met her second husband, a professional juggler, Haggis McLeod, and in 1988 they had a daughter, Jessica Churchill-McLeod. Working alongside her father, Churchill-McLeod took over the running of her mother's Children’s Festival in 2012.

== Death and commemoration ==
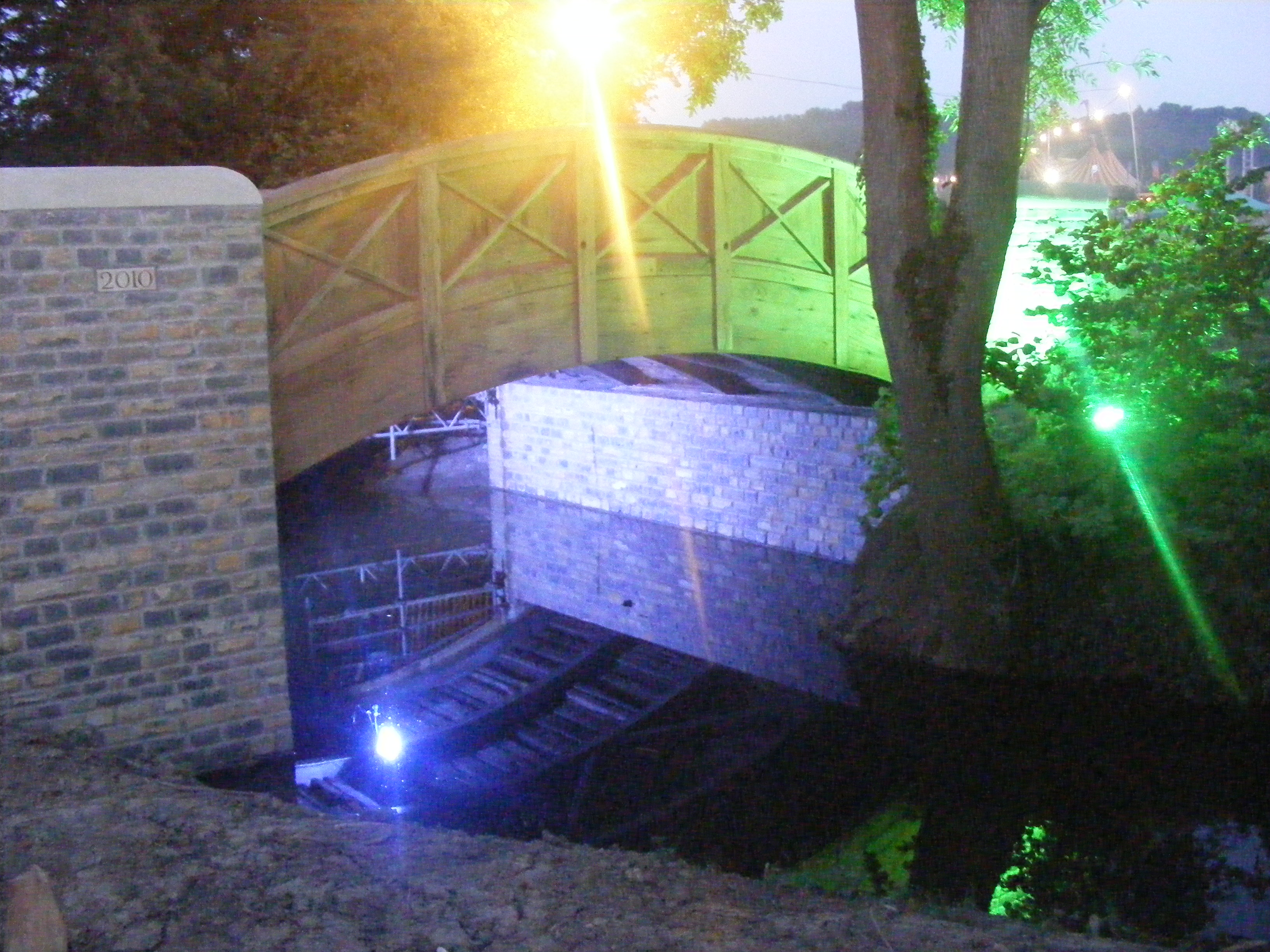
A bridge, dedicated to Arabella Churchill, over the Whitelake River on the site of the Glastonbury Festival

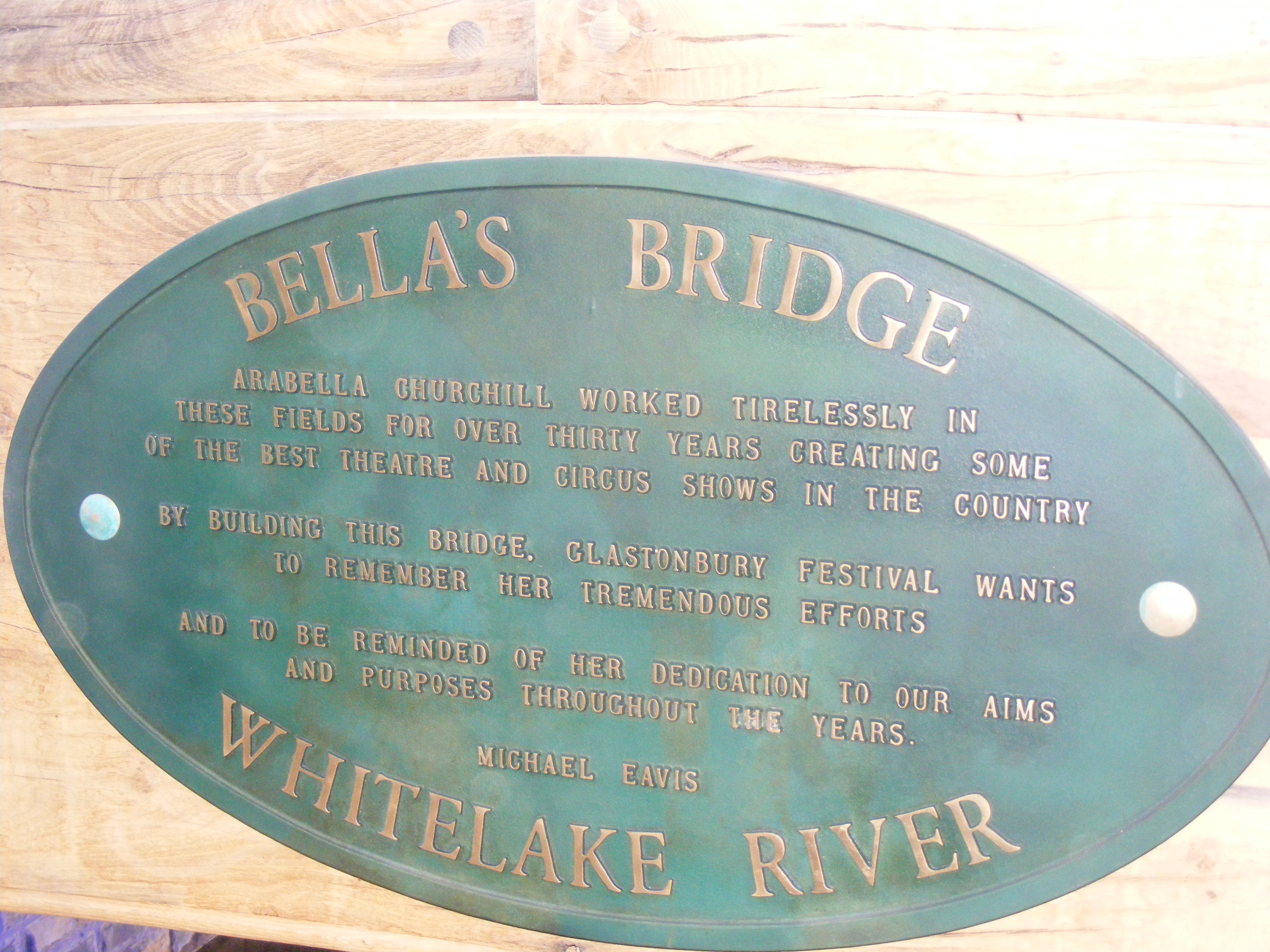
Dedication plaque on "Bella's Bridge"

On Thursday, 20 December 2007, Churchill died at St Edmund's Cottages, Bove Town, Glastonbury, Somerset, aged 58. She had had a short illness due to pancreatic cancer. Churchill, who had embraced Tibetan Buddhism through the teachings of Sogyal Rinpoche, author of The Tibetan Book of Living and Dying, refused chemotherapy and radiotherapy. Arrangements following her death reflected her Buddhism, and included a parade and simple farewell on the final evening of the Glastonbury Festival in June 2008.

Festival organiser Michael Eavis, paying tribute to Churchill after her death, said: "Her energy, vitality and great sense of morality and social responsibility have given her a place in our festival history second to none."

In 2010, Eavis received a donation from British Waterways of timber from the old gates at Caen Hill Locks in Wiltshire. This was used to construct a new bridge, dedicated to Churchill's memory, at the Glastonbury Festival site. That same year, Arthur Smith, Andrew Kerr, Haggis McLeod and Michael Eavis offered their tributes to Arabella Churchill, "the first lady of Glastonbury", for BBC radio.
