= Thomas Crimble =

Thomas Crimble is a musician who played with Skin Alley and Hawkwind before becoming a central part of the organisation of the Glastonbury Festival from the 1971 free festival until 1999. He subsequently became involved in Nik Turner's alternative Hawkwind project Space Ritual.

== Early career ==
He founded Skin Alley with drummer Giles Pope and manager Richard Thomas (of Clearwater fame), a progressive Jazz-Rock band later to be signed to the Stax Label after leaving CBS. Whilst in Skin Alley, Thomas and Giles jammed with Jimi Hendrix and Stephen Stills at the Speakeasy Club in London.

After leaving Skin Alley, he was asked to join Hawkwind as bass player, replacing John Harrison who had just completed the first album. Played in Hawkwind for about 8 months, playing live every night and helping create tracks on the In Search of Space album. He played with Hawkwind outside the official Isle of Wight Festival 1970, which was greatly enjoyed by Jimi Hendrix, although he didn't join in that time.

== Glastonbury Festival ==
At the Isle of Wight festival, it struck Crimble that there must be a better way to organise festivals and, through his then girlfriend Jytte Klamer, met Andrew Kerr who shared the same ideas. Having been asked to help organise the 1971 Glastonbury Free Festival, with Andrew Kerr, Jutte Klamer, Mark Irons and Arabella Churchill, he became one of the central organisers then and through working closely with Michael Eavis for nearly 30 years. Crimble brought in Gilberto Gil with ideas from Brazilian carnival, a perfect example of a free, almost spontaneous, multidisciplinary arts festival, becoming crucial to the way the festival developed.

During his time with the festival he formed the festival farm house band, The Worthy Farm Windfuckers, who played on the original iconic Pyramid stage with Johnny Hodge & 'English' John Fox. Thomas also played with Hawkwind at the 1971 festival, as Dave Brock was unavailable. He continued to work with Michael Eavis and the team every Glastonbury Festival until 1999. The Windfuckers also played with Robin Lawrence and Michael Wilding's band in Wales, 'Solar Ben', and many others over the years.

== Later career ==
In the 1970s he also ran the Mountain studios, a rehearsal/recording studio in Wales, where he lived from the early seventies onwards. The studios were used by bands including the Thompson Twins, Killing Joke, Marillion, Roy Harper, Saxon, China Crisis, Perfect People, The Slits with Neneh Cherry, Pig Bag, The Pop Group, Max Splodge, Doll by Doll and the Gang of Four. Crimble also wrote songs with John Otway on the 'Where Did I Go Right?' album, produced by Neil Innes.

In 2001 he became a founder member, along with Terry Ollis, of Space Ritual, Nik Turner's alternative Hawkwind, originally Xhawkwind until legal action prevented use of the name. Starting on bass guitar, moving to rhythm guitar (to accommodate Dave Anderson playing with the band) and has now evolved to playing Hammond Organ & Roland XP80 synth keyboards.

== Current and personal life ==
He is currently writing film music, songs and jingles. Away from work, his hobbies are gardening and restoring a Victorian garden in Wales.
