= Skin Alley =

British progressive rock combo (1968–1974)

- Origin: London, England
- Genres: Progressive rock; jazz rock; progressive folk
- Years active: 1968–1974
- Labels: CBS, Transatlantic, Columbia, Stax

Skin Alley were a British progressive rock band founded by Thomas Crimble and Giles 'Alvin' Pope in the autumn of 1968. The original lineup consisted of Crimble on bass guitar and vocals, Pope on drums, Max Taylor on guitar, and Jeremy Sagar on lead vocals. Taylor and Sagar left early in 1969, and were replaced by Krzysztof Henryk Juszkiewicz on Hammond organ, a musician of Polish descent, and Bob James on saxophone, flute, guitar and vocals.

== Career ==
The band, comprising Thomas Crimble, Alvin Pope, Krzysztof Henryk Juszkiewicz and Bob James, were signed to CBS Records for their eponymous 1970 debut, and its 1970 follow-up, To Pagham and Beyond. Crimble moved on that year to play bass with Hawkwind and organise the Glastonbury Festival, and was replaced by Nick Graham (formerly of Atomic Rooster, not to be confused with Nicky Graham from The End and Tucky Buzzard) before the album was completed, Graham singing on two of the tracks. Pope left at the same time and was replaced by Tony Knight.

In May 1972, Skin Alley appeared at Lincoln Festival's NME-sponsored Giants of Tomorrow marquee. A switch to the Transatlantic Records label in 1972 heralded the release of the band's third LP, Two Quid Deal. By the time their fourth album, Skintight, was released in 1973, they were playing more commercial, mainstream rock with orchestration and brass arrangements. The band split shortly afterwards, with Graham having the most successful post-Skin career with his groups Alibi and the Humans in the early 1980s.

US-based Columbia Records had no interest in the band and declined to release either CBS album in the US. The third and fourth albums were issued in the US by Stax Records. Although Stax was keen on expanding its repertoire into rock, the label was not successful in promoting its rock acts, and both Skin Alley albums were largely ignored in the US.

Keyboardist Krzysztof Henryk Juszkiewicz died in 2022 at the age 74-75.

== Band members ==
- Thomas Crimble - bass, vocals, keyboards, harmonica
- Robert 'Bob' James - saxophone, flute, guitar, vocals
- Krzysztof Henryk Juszkiewicz - organ, piano, accordion, harpsichord, mellotron, vocals, trumpet (died 2022)
- Giles 'Alvin' Pope - drums, percussion
- Nick Graham - vocals, keyboards, bass, flute
- Tony Knight - drums, vocals

== Albums ==
- Skin Alley (CBS 63847) March 1969
- To Pagham and Beyond (CBS 64140) December 1970
- Two Quid Deal? (Transatlantic Big T TRA 260) October 1972
- Skintight (Transatlantic Big T TRA 273) November 1973

== Singles ==
- "Tell Me" / "Better Be Blind" (CBS 5045) 1970
- "You Got Me Danglin'" / "Skin Valley Serenade" (Big T BIG 506) 1972
- "In The Midnight Hour" / "Broken Eggs" (Big T BIG 511) 1972
