= Cheese and Grain =

Music venue in Frome, England

- The Cheese and Grain in March 2024
- Interactive map of Cheese and Grain
- Coordinates: 51°14′0.38″N 2°19′12.83″W
- Capacity: 800/500

Construction
- Opened: 1998

Website
- www.cheeseandgrain.com

The Cheese and Grain is a live music and arts venue, and a community and education centre, in Frome, England. The main room has a capacity of over 800 people standing or 500 seated. Built in 1874 as a market hall, it has seen a number of changes of use in its history. The venue is the largest music venue in Somerset and has seen artists such as Joni Mitchell, Robert Plant and Joan Armatrading play there, whilst the Foo Fighters and Paul McCartney have played secret shows there in 2017 and 2022 respectively.

== History ==
The hall was built in 1874 as a market for farm produce, with a secondary use as a community hall. During the Second World War, the hall became a munitions factory, and was then used as a storage depot for tyres, before being purchased by Mendip District Council. At the time, Frome Town Council was looking for a replacement for the Market Hall in the town centre, which was due to be demolished; the hall was handed to the Town Council for this purpose in 1996, before being refurbished and opening on 12 September 1998. In 2002, the venue was closed for major improvements and to install soundproofing to lessen noise nuisance to the surrounding area; it reopened ten months later in 2003, with ownership being transferred to an independent charitable trust.

== Music venue ==
The main hall of the venue holds 835 people in standing configuration and 500 seated. As the only medium-sized music venue in the area, it is able to attract well-known artists to play there; apart from those mentioned above, others have included Hawkwind, Editors, Biffy Clyro, Fatboy Slim, Frank Turner and Public Image Limited.

On 24 February 2017, the Foo Fighters announced that they would be headlining Glastonbury Festival that year. As part of the announcement, they secretly hired the Cheese and Grain and played a surprise show that night, selecting most of the ticket-holders from people on their mailing list living in a 50-mile radius of Frome. In 2022, Paul McCartney was headlining the Saturday night at Glastonbury, and on the preceding Thursday announced a show at the venue on the following night. Tickets had to be purchased from the venue, causing traffic gridlock in the town.

== Other events and facilities ==
Like its earlier incarnation, the Cheese and Grain held farmer's markets every month, although in 2022 the market relocated to the nearby Boyle Cross after a drop in patronage after the Covid pandemic. Other commercial events, such as flea markets and antiques fairs, are regularly held.

The venue can also hold smaller events such as meetings up to 30 people in its mezzanine area. There is a cafe and bar which serves food and drink during the venue's opening times.
