= Emily Eavis =

Organiser of the Glastonbury Festival

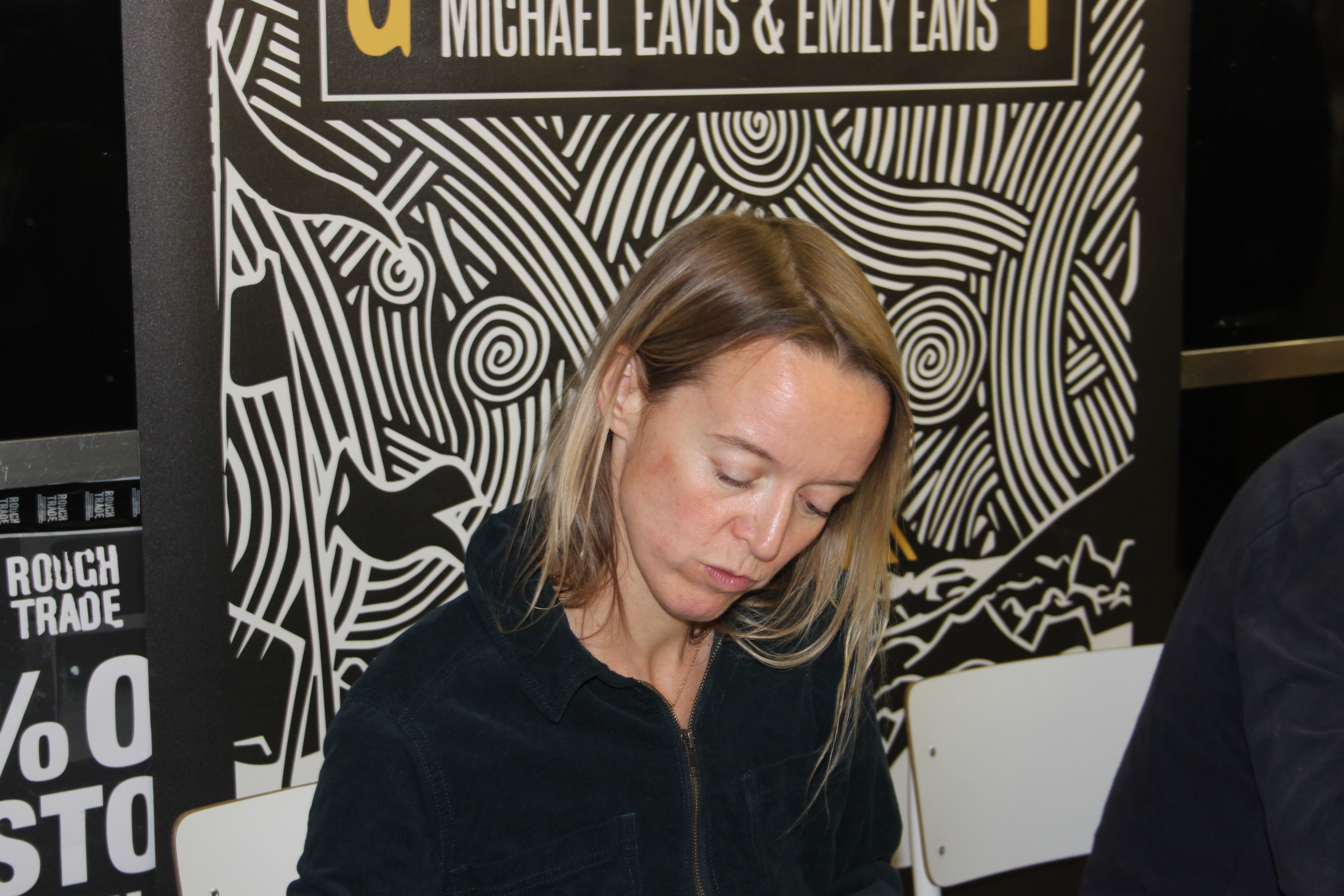
- Eavis at a book signing in November 2019
- Born: 26 July 1979 (age 47)
- Education: Wells Cathedral School; Goldsmiths, University of London
- Known for: Organising the Glastonbury Festival
- Children: 3
- Father: Michael Eavis

Emily Rose Eavis (born 26 July 1979) is organiser of the annual Glastonbury Festival, and the youngest daughter of the festival's founder, Michael Eavis, and his second wife Jean.

== Personal life ==
Eavis grew up on Worthy Farm, Somerset, the site of the Glastonbury Festival. In 1985, aged five, she performed Twinkle, Twinkle, Little Star on the Festival's Pyramid Stage immediately before The Style Council headlined. After leaving Wells Cathedral School in 1997, she began a teaching degree at Goldsmiths University, London. When her mother became ill with cancer, Eavis deferred her course and returned home to care for her.

Eavis married music manager Nick Dewey in August 2009. The couple have three children: sons born in 2011 and 2013 and a daughter born in 2016.

== Music events career ==
=== Glastonbury Festival ===
Following her mother's death in 1999, Eavis began assisting her father in running the festival and became co-organiser of the event. Since then, she has steadily taken over the running of the festival from her father.

In 2007, Eavis created The Park area with her partner, Dewey and in 2008, Eavis booked the festival's first hip hop headliner, Jay-Z. Eavis and Dewey are now responsible for booking all of Glastonbury's main stages and Dewey is officially the festival's Head of Music Programming.

Other artists Eavis and Dewey have booked include: The Rolling Stones, Adele, Bruce Springsteen, Beyoncé, Stevie Wonder, Dolly Parton, Kanye West, Neil Young, Lionel Richie, Blur, Paul Simon, Arctic Monkeys, Electric Light Orchestra, Radiohead, Foo Fighters, Ed Sheeran, Stormzy, Kendrick Lamar, Billie Eilish, SZA, Elton John, Dua Lipa, Neil Young, Olivia Rodrigo and Paul McCartney. Eavis has also booked African and Middle Eastern artists on the Pyramid Stage including Amadou & Mariam, Rokia Traore, Bassekou Kouyate, Songhoy Blues, Baaba Maal and Syrian National Orchestra for Arabic Music.

=== Other events ===
Eavis has organised several fundraising concerts for Oxfam, including a Make Trade Fair concert at London's Astoria in October 2002 with Coldplay, Noel Gallagher and Ms Dynamite and a show at the Hammersmith Apollo in September 2004 headlined by REM. Eavis also organised a concert opposing the Iraq War at the Shepherd's Bush Empire in 2003, featuring Coldplay, Paul Weller, Faithless and Ronan Keating.

== Views ==
Eavis has advocated female equality in music and equal representation across stages at Glastonbury and, in 2024, booked two female Pyramid Stage headliners, Dua Lipa and SZA, for the first time in the event's history.

In 2019, Eavis was behind Glastonbury's decision to ban the sale of single-use plastic bottles at that year's festival in a bid to cut waste, while in 2023 she sourced a potato chips manufacturer producing crisps in biodegradable packaging to supply the event. Eavis also booked Greta Thunberg to speak at Glastonbury 2022, introducing the Swedish climate change activist before her Pyramid Stage appearance. Ahead of the festival's "fallow" break in 2026, Eavis said the event planned to plant 30,000 trees on the site during the event's year off.

Eavis is an ambassador for Oxfam, gender equality movement Keychange, music charity the PRS Foundation and Visit Somerset, as well as a patron for the childhood bereavement charity Winston's Wish and Frome's not-for-profit music and arts venue the Cheese and Grain. She oversees Glastonbury's support for charities and good causes which totalled £4.2 million in 2025 and £5.9m in 2024.

Explaining the festival's financial model to the BBC's Sidetracked podcast in 2025, Eavis stated that while the event aims to give away as much money to good causes as it can, Glastonbury now pays its artists more than it ever has. She also said the event needs to make a profit both to recover from the £10 million losses the festival made during its enforced two year absence during the COVID-19 pandemic and to enable itself to buy land around the site to safeguard its future.

In the same interview, Eavis said she believes it's important Glastonbury remains a place for people to campaign about topics such as politics, the environment and social justice, while acknowledging that some at the festival "choose not to do any of that".

== Honours and tributes ==
In 2016, Eavis and her father Michael were awarded honorary fellowships from Goldsmiths University of London. In 2019, she was awarded the Outstanding Contribution honour at the Music Week Women In Music Awards. She was also named the Godlike Genius at the NME Awards 2020. In November 2024, Eavis was included in Time Magazine's 2024 TIME100 Climate list, which celebrated individuals making significant progress in fighting climate change through their work.

== See also ==
- Music industry
- Music management
- Promoter (entertainment)
- Woodstock
