= Children's World (charity) =

UK based charitable organisation

Children's World is a charity based in the UK. It is known internationally (as Children's World International). It was set up by Arabella Churchill in 1981 after the success of the Children's World area at the Glastonbury Festival. It is registered charity Number 282743.

Children's World was created to provide drama participation and creative play and to work creatively in educational settings, providing social and emotional benefits for all children, particularly those with special needs.

Children's World International (Charity Reg. No. 1079546) is the sister charity of Children's World and was started in 1999 to work with children in the Balkans, in conjunction with Balkan Sunflowers and Save the Children.

Children's World changed to a Charitable Incorporated Organisation (CIO) and has a new number: 1172322. Children's World International was closed and the projects taken on by Children's World.

== See also ==
- Glastonbury
