= Black Roots (band) =

English reggae band

- Origin: Bristol, England, UK
- Genres: Reggae
- Years active: 1979–early 1990s, late 2000s–present
- Labels: Nubian, Kick, BBC Records and Tapes, Makasound, Bristol Archive, Sugar Shack, Soulbeats, Khanti, Take It Easy Agency, Real Rock
- Members: Errol Brown; Kondwani Ngozi; Jabulani Ngozi; Carlton Smith
- Past members: Trevor Seivwright; Derrick King; Charles Bryan aka Delroy O'Gilvie; Cordell Francis
- Website: blackrootsreggae.net

Black Roots are a roots reggae band from the St. Paul's area of Bristol, England, formed in 1979. They toured extensively in the UK and Europe in the 1980s and early 1990s releasing several albums and singles during that time before disappearing from the music scene for about ten years. Their comeback began when Soundicate/Makasound, a record label in France, released an album in 2004 and followed it up with another in 2007 (both were compilations made up from their extensive back catalogue). In December 2010 they performed their first live show for some twenty years at the Trinity Hall in Bristol and since then they have been active once again, playing live dates and releasing a new album.

== History ==
The original line-up of the band included Errol Brown (vocals), Delroy O'Gilvie (vocals), Kondwani Ngozi (congas, vocals), Jabulani Ngozi (rhythm guitar), Cordell Francis (lead guitar), Trevor Seivwright (drums), and Derrick King (bass guitar). They soon got into routine of regular performances across the UK and appeared on the first Rockers Roadshow television programme broadcast of Channel 4. Their first (self-titled) album was released on their Kick, and the band was commissioned by the BBC to write and record the theme song to the sitcom The Front Line. They also recorded several sessions for BBC radio, including sessions for John Peel's show in 1981 and 1983 and additional sessions for David Jensen, and these were issued on the In Session album in 1985 by the BBC. They toured Europe with UB40, Eek-A-Mouse and Linton Kwesi Johnson, and performed at the WOMAD Festival in 1985. The band's third album, All Day All Night was produced by Mad Professor and featured Vin Gordon. Several more albums followed, the last, Natural Reaction, in 1990.

The band then ceased to exist as a touring concern, although several dub albums were released based on their earlier work over the next five years. Nubian Records released Dub Factor – The Mad Professor Mixes in 1991, Dub Factor 2 – The Dub Judah Mixes in 1994 and Dub Factor 3 – Dub Chronicles The Mad Professor and Dub Judah Mixes in 1995.

The final studio album release from the band, during the period, came in 1993, it was a reworking of earlier recordings produced by Dub Judah, entitled Black Roots with Friends featuring vocals by B.B. Seaton, Trevor Dixon, Dub Judah, Mikey Forbes and a cameo performance by Delroy Ogilvie. Then activity ceases completely for several years.

French label Makasound released a compilation of the band's first two albums on a fourteen-track CD titled On The Frontline on 4 July 2004. It was followed on 25 November 2007 with a reissue of In Session. On the back of these releases the band did some live shows in France. Bristol Archive Records approached the band and offered to re-release some more of their back catalogue. They first released a compilation of the band's singles entitled The Reggae Singles Anthology on double vinyl, CD and digital download on 5 September 2011 that included a re-mastered version of the Celebration video recording on DVD and followed this with a reissue on CD of All Day All Night on 23 April 2012 with bonus tracks.

In April 2012 the band record new material for an album, On The Ground, that was co-released by Sugar Shack Records and Nubian Records on 10 September 2012. The album was produced by Jeff Spencer and Black Roots and mixed by Louis Beckett. The album featured the four original vocalists — Delroy Ogilvie, Carlton Smith, Errol Brown and Kondwani Ngozi — as well as two of the musicians from the original line up, guitarists Cordell Francis and Jabulani Ngozi. It was followed by the dub version On The Ground in Dub, also on Sugar Shack and Nubian Records that was released on 4 March 2013. The band released a second album of new recordings via French record company Soulbeats Records on 23 September 2014 entitled Ghetto Feel. This album is also produced by Jeff Spencer and Black Roots and mixed by Louis Beckett. This release has been followed by a third album of new studio recordings produced and mixed by the same team as Ghetto Feel called Son Of Man and released by Soulbeats Records on 22 January 2016.

Black Roots released a single on 22 August 2016 entitled Move On EP on their own label Nubian Records on digital download only. It contains 5 mixes of Move On, a song first recorded and released by the band in 1981 on their debut 12" vinyl record that coincidentally was also the first record they released on their own label Nubian Records. This was followed by another digital only single release on Nubian in 2017 titled I Believe, containing 4 mixes of this song taken off the On The Ground album.

The band have added a further 2 studio albums to their extensive discography by releasing Take It in November 2018 and Nothing in the Larder in June 2021 in collaboration with Khanti Records and Take It Easy Agency respectively both based in France. In 2021 they licensed 5 recordings and their respective dub versions to Real Records in Italy. 4 of these, Juvenile Delinquent/Dub the Youth; What Them a Do/Jah Jah Dub; Release the Food/Folitrickshun Dub and All Day All Night/Pressure Dub were released as limited edition 7" vinyl records in 2021. The last of these recordings Blackheart Man/Blacheart Dub is releasing in early 2022.

The band have played a series of live shows, since they reformed in 2010, both in the UK and in Europe, including Bristol Veg Fest 2011 and 2014, ATP I'll Be Your Mirror curated by Portishead at Alexandra Palace in London, Sardinia Reggae Festival in Italy, WOW Festival in the Isle of Wight, Glastonbury, Lambeth Country Show in Brockworth Park in London, Festival Ecolozicalizes, Garance Reggae Festival, Reggae Sun Ska and Nomade Reggae FestivaL in France, Dour and Afro C in Belgium, Ostroda Reggae Festival in Poland, Octopode in Switzerland and Rototom Sunsplash in Spain.

Singer O'Gilvie formed a new band, Orange Street, and released a solo album, Farm Digging, in 2005. Sady Charles Bryan aka Delroy O'Gilvie died unexpectedly in July 2019.

Bass guitarist Derrick King died on 30 April 2011 at Frenchay Hospital from respiratory failure, after suffering from motor neuron disease for some time.

== Discography ==
=== Albums ===
- Black Roots (1983), Kick (limited edition vinyl reissue by Bristol Archive in 2013)
- The Front Line (1984), BBC
- In Session (1985), BBC (reissued with bonus tracks on Makasound in 2008)
- All Day All Night (1987), Nubian (reissued with bonus tracks on Bristol Archive in 2012)
- In a Different Style (1988), Nubian
- Live Power (1989), Nubian
- Natural Reaction (1990), Nubian
- With Friends (1993), Nubian
- On the Ground (2012), Sugar Shack/Nubian
- Ghetto Feel (2014), Soulbeats/Nubian
- Son Of Man (2016), Soulbeats/Nubian
- Take It (2018), Khanti/Nubian
- Nothing in the Larder (2021), Take it Easy/Nubian

Dub albums

- Dub Factor: The Mad Professor Mixes (1991), Nubian
- Dub Factor 2: The Dub Judah Mixes (1994), Nubian
- Dub Factor 3: Dub Judah & Mad Professor Mixes (1995), Nubian
- On the Ground in Dub (2013), Sugar Shack/Nubian

Compilations

- On the Frontline (2004), Makasound
- The Reggae Singles Anthology (2011), Bristol Archive

=== Singles ===
- Bristol Rock EP (1981), Nubian
- Chanting For Freedom (1981), Nubian
- Move On (1983), Silvertown
- Juvenile Delinquent (1984), Kick
- The Frontline (1984), BBC Records and Tapes
- Seeing Your Face (1986), Nubian
- Suzy Wong (1987), Nubian
- Let It Be (1987), Nubian
- Start Afresh (1988), Nubian
- Zoom (1989), Nubian
- Natural Reaction Remixes EP (1993), Nubian
- Pin In The Ocean (2011), Bristol Archive
- Pompous Way (2012), Sugar Shack
- Son Of Man (2016), Soulbeats
- Move On EP (2016), Nubian
- I Believe EP (2017), Nubian
- Nothing in the Larder (2021), Nubian
- Juvenile Delinquent/Dub the Youth 7" only (2021), Real Rock
- What Them A Do/Jah Jah Dub 7" only (2021), Real Rock
- Release the Food/Politrickshun Dub 7" only (2021), Real Rock
- All Day All Night/Pressure Dub 7" only (2021), Real Rock

=== Video ===
- Celebration (1989), Nubian
- Ghetto Feel (2014), Nubian
- Son Of Man (2016), Nubian
- Move On (2016), Nubian
- I Believe featuring Jah Garvey, (2017) Nubian
- Take It (2018), Nubian
- Nothing in the Larder 2021, Nubian
