= Andrew Kerr (festival co-founder) =

Co-founder of Glastonbury Fair (1933–2014)

- Born: 29 November 1933; Ewell, Surrey, England
- Died: 6 October 2014 (aged 80); Pilton, Somerset, England
- Occupation: Author
- Known for: Co-founder of Glastonbury Fair (AKA Fayre)

Andrew Kerr (29 November 1933 – 6 October 2014) was a co-founder of Glastonbury Fair, the 1971 forerunner of today's Glastonbury Festival. Kerr managed the festival site up to the mid-1980s, helping establish it as the UK's foremost music festival.

== Glastonbury Fair ==
In June 1971, Kerr staged "Glastonbury Fair", along with Arabella Churchill and some other friends. Glastonbury Fair originated the use of the name 'Glastonbury', the June date, and the pyramid stage, inspired by the work of author John Michell. The position of the stage was dowsed by Kerr according with his belief in ley lines, and the 'Glastonbury' part of the festival's name was introduced.

Kerr was inspired to put on a free festival after his experience at the commercial Isle of Wight Festival in 1970. His original motivation for staging a free festival was outlined in a leaflet published at the time:

Man is fast ruining his environment. He is suffering from the effects of pollution; from the neurosis brought about by a basically urban industrial society: from the lack of spirituality in his life. The aims are, therefore: the conservation of our natural resources; a respect for nature and life; and a spiritual awakening.

To mark the 40th anniversary of the Glastonbury Fair, at the 2011 Glastonbury Festival Kerr organised a 'Spirit of 71' stage, with a number of the original performers. 'Spirit of 71' was also incorporated into the 2013 festival.

In his book Groovy Old Men author Nick Baker says of Kerr:

His contribution to the British music scene is incontrovertibly huge. Without him there would be no Glastonbury Festival.

== Life ==
Born in Ewell, Surrey, in 1933, Kerr's childhood during the war years was spent in south Oxfordshire, but he was evacuated to Ilfracombe for a period, and immediately afterwards the family was farming in the area. He was at school at Radley College. He spent his National Service as a stores assistant at Portsmouth in the Royal Navy, in which his father also served.

Andrew Kerr has been a gardener, minicab driver, sailor, farmer, tv researcher and festival starter. He has met Jimi Hendrix, Princess Margaret, Winston Churchill and the Grateful Dead. He can build dry stone walls, shear sheep and navigate sea going vessels. He is enthusiastic about numerology and ley lines. For someone who was in at the start of the green movement he doesn't bang on about it.

For ten years following 1958 he was employed as personal assistant to Randolph Spencer Churchill, who was writing the official biography of his father, Winston Churchill.

After organising Glastonbury Fair in 1971, Kerr continued to manage the Glastonbury Festival site up until the mid-1980s.

In 1992, Kerr put on the Whole Earth Show in Dorset, promoting organic agriculture and sustainable technologies. BBC Radio 4 carried the first wind-powered broadcast from the show, while Tibetan priests blessed the site and those present.

Kerr was a consistent advocate of the benefits of aerobic composting, and has spoken on TV and radio about composting and the potential of compost funerals.

Kerr spent his last years in Pilton, Somerset, home of the Glastonbury Festival.

== Autobiography ==
Kerr's autobiography Intolerably Hip: The Memoirs of Andrew Kerr was published in May 2011.
