= Michael Eavis =

English farmer, Glastonbury Festival co-creator (born 1935)

Sir Michael Eavis CBE
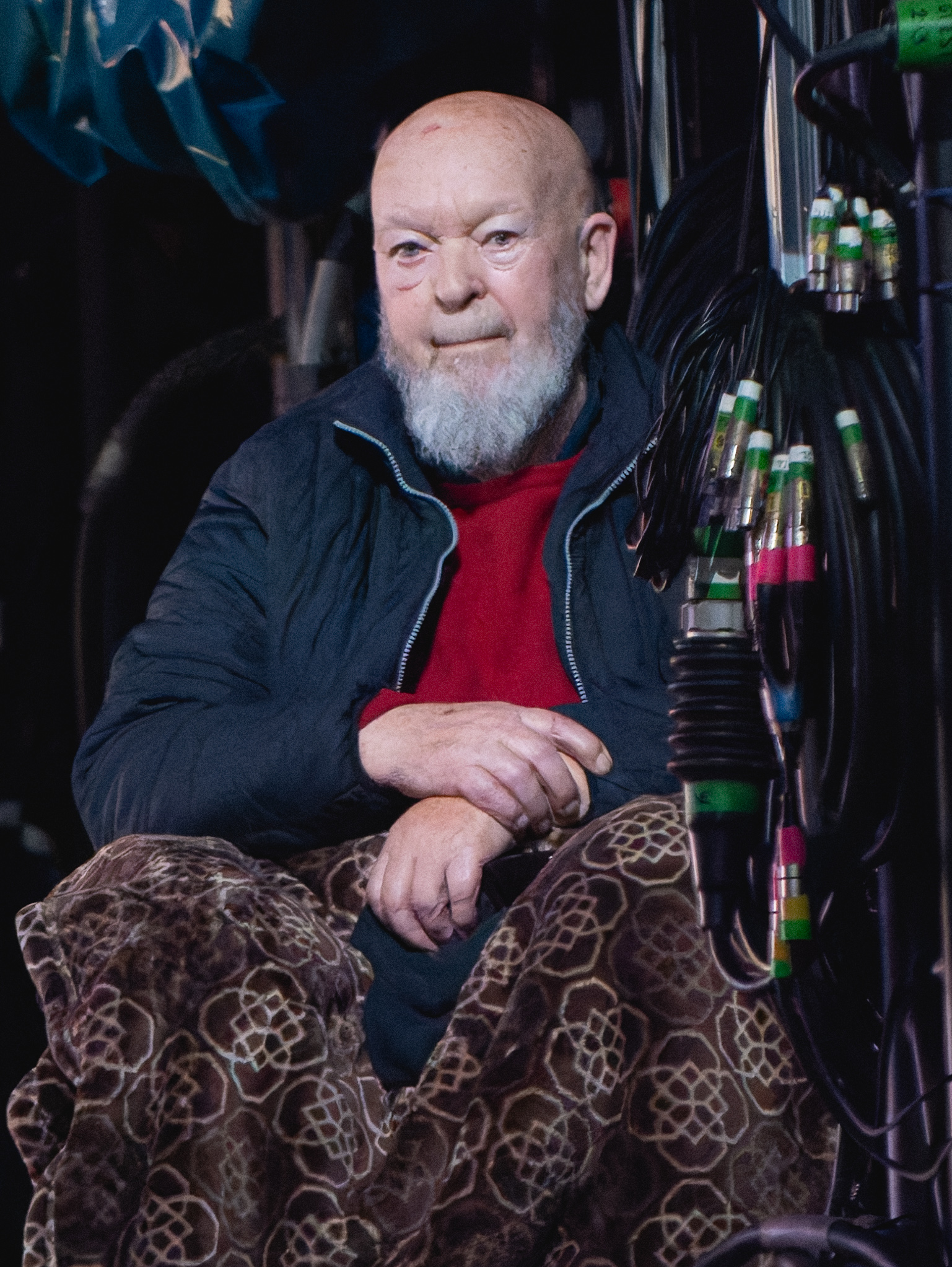
- Eavis in 2024
- Born: Athelstan Joseph Michael Eavis; 17 October 1935 (age 90); Pilton, Somerset, England, UK
- Occupations: Farmer; businessman
- Known for: Co-creator of Glastonbury Festival
- Children: 5, including Emily Eavis

Sir Athelstan Joseph Michael Eavis (born 17 October 1935) is an English dairy farmer and the co-creator of the Glastonbury Festival, which takes place at his farm in Pilton, Somerset.

== Personal life ==
Eavis was born in Pilton, Somerset, on 17 October 1935, and grew up at Worthy Farm in the village. His father was a dairy farmer and a Methodist local preacher, and his mother a school teacher. Eavis was educated at Wells Cathedral School, followed by the Thames Nautical Training College in Greenhithe, Kent, after which he joined the Union-Castle Line, part of the British Merchant Navy, as a trainee midshipman. His plan was to spend twenty years at sea, and return with a pension to help subsidise the income from the family farm.

After his father died when Eavis was 19, he inherited the family farm of 150 acres (61 ha) and 60 cows. He worked at Mendip Colliery at Nettlebridge or New Rock colliery at Stratton-on-the-Fosse on the Somerset Coalfield for a couple of years to help supplement the income from the farm.

Eavis and his first wife, Ruth, had three daughters, but divorced in 1964. He married Jean Hayball, with whom he had a son and a daughter, Emily. Jean died of cancer in 1999, and Eavis has since married his third wife, Liz. In common with his parents and second wife, Eavis remains a practising Methodist, although he has also stated that he is "not really bothered" about the existence of God. He is a teetotaler and does not smoke.

== Glastonbury Festival ==
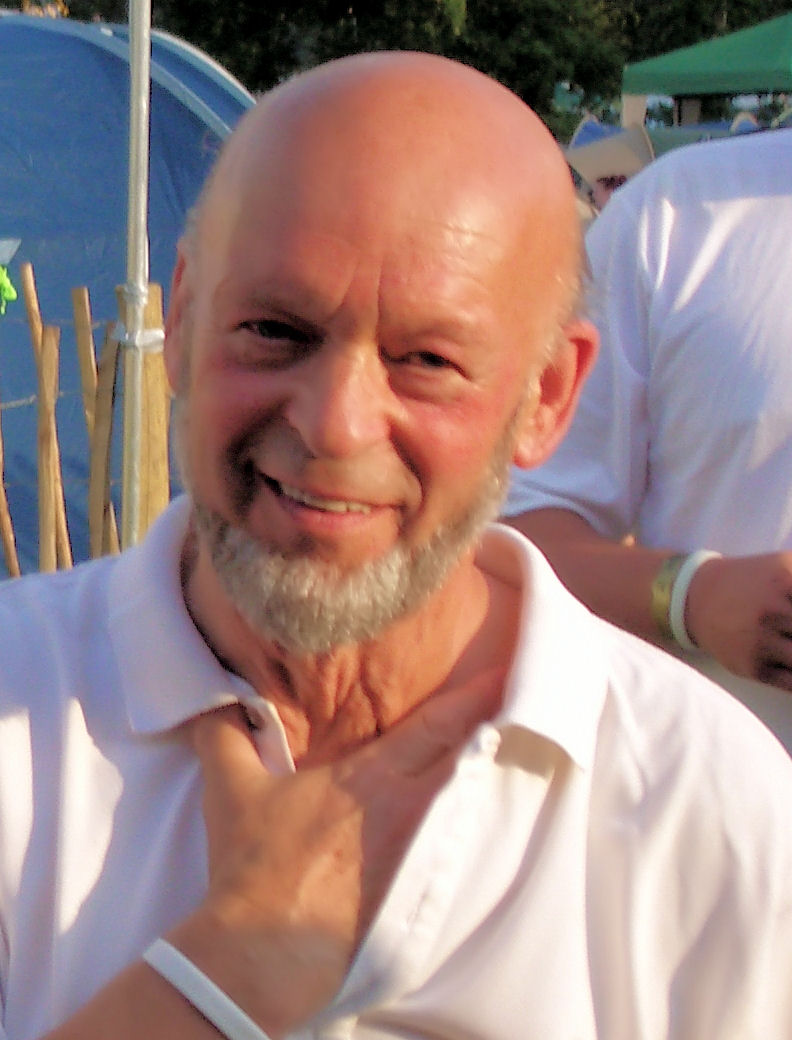
Eavis in 2005

In June 1970, Eavis and his second wife Jean visited the Bath Festival of Blues and Progressive Music. Inspired by seeing the performance of Led Zeppelin, Eavis hosted the Pilton Pop Folk & Blues Festival in 1970. The following year a free festival, Glastonbury Fayre, was organised by Andrew Kerr and associates. It later developed into Glastonbury Festival.

In 2010, the festival's 40th year, Eavis appeared on the main stage at the festival with headline artist Stevie Wonder, to sing the chorus of the latter's "Happy Birthday".

== Political activity ==
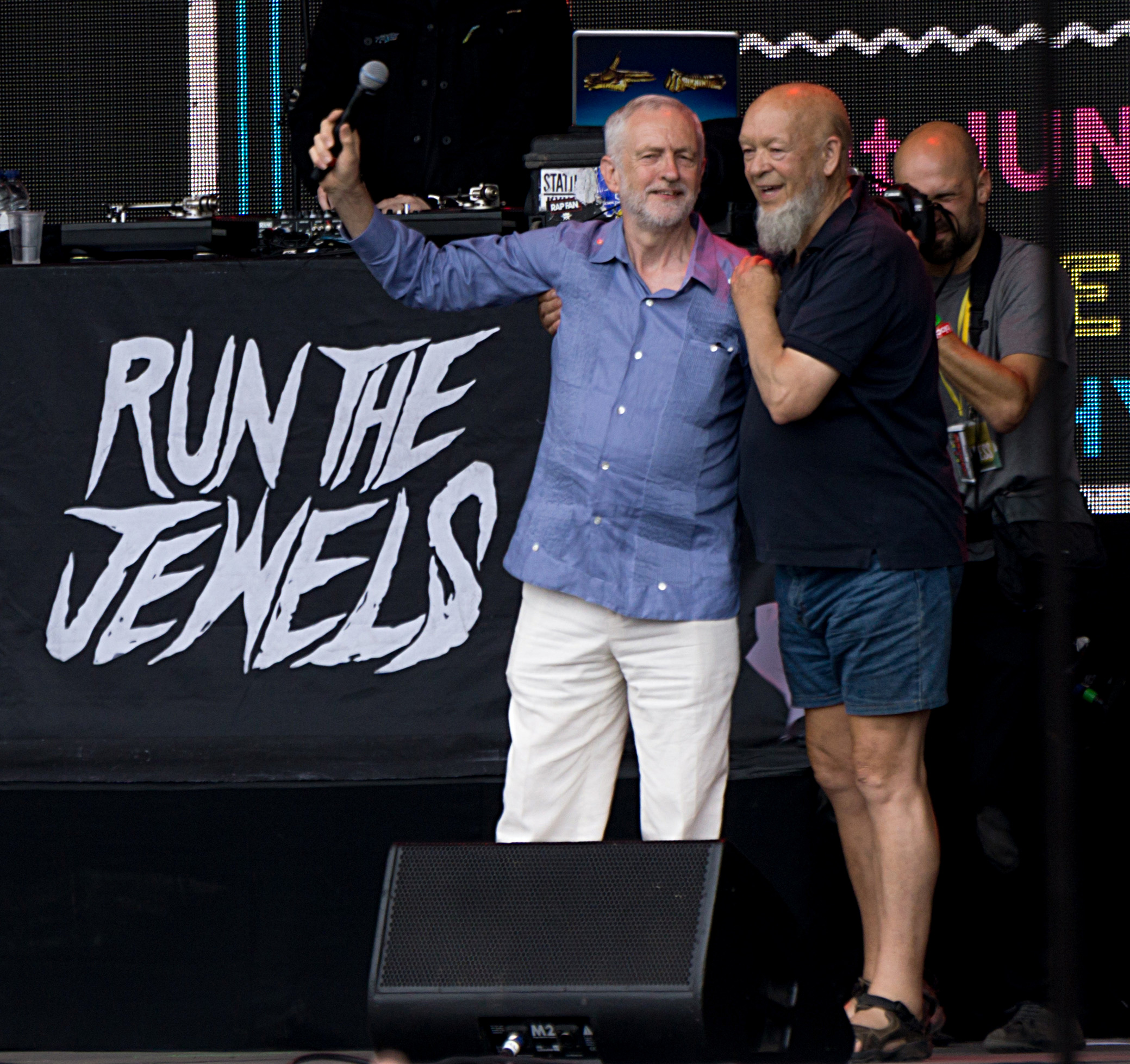
Jeremy Corbyn and Eavis together on the Pyramid Stage at the 2017 Glastonbury Festival

Eavis has credited a number of influences for his political views, including traditions of nonconformity in his family, as well as his time as a miner, during which he was a member of the National Union of Mineworkers. During the early 1980s he was involved in establishing a local branch of the Campaign for Nuclear Disarmament, and subsequently agreed to make the Glastonbury Festival a fundraiser for CND, as it was from 1981 to 1987.

After recovering from stomach cancer, Eavis stood as a candidate for the Labour Party in the 1997 general election in Wells, polling 10,204 votes. In 2004, however, he suggested that disillusioned Labour voters should switch their vote to the Green Party in protest at the Iraq War, though he returned to supporting the Labour Party in 2010.

In 2005, Eavis was quoted in The Guardian as being a supporter of hunting. "I don't hunt myself, but I support the people who want to hunt. With all that's going on in the world, it was outrageous to ban it." In 2006, he was appointed as President of the Somerset Chamber of commerce and Industry.

In 2011, Eavis was quoted as lamenting the decline in political activity associated with the Glastonbury Festival. He was guest editor of the Western Daily Press newspaper on Glastonbury's 'fallow' weekend, 23 June 2012.

Eavis invited Labour leader Jeremy Corbyn to appear at the 2017 festival, introducing the Run the Jewels' set. Eavis supported Corbyn's anti-nuclear and anti-austerity policies, saying "he's got something new and precious, and people are excited about it. He really is the hero of the hour."

== Charitable work ==
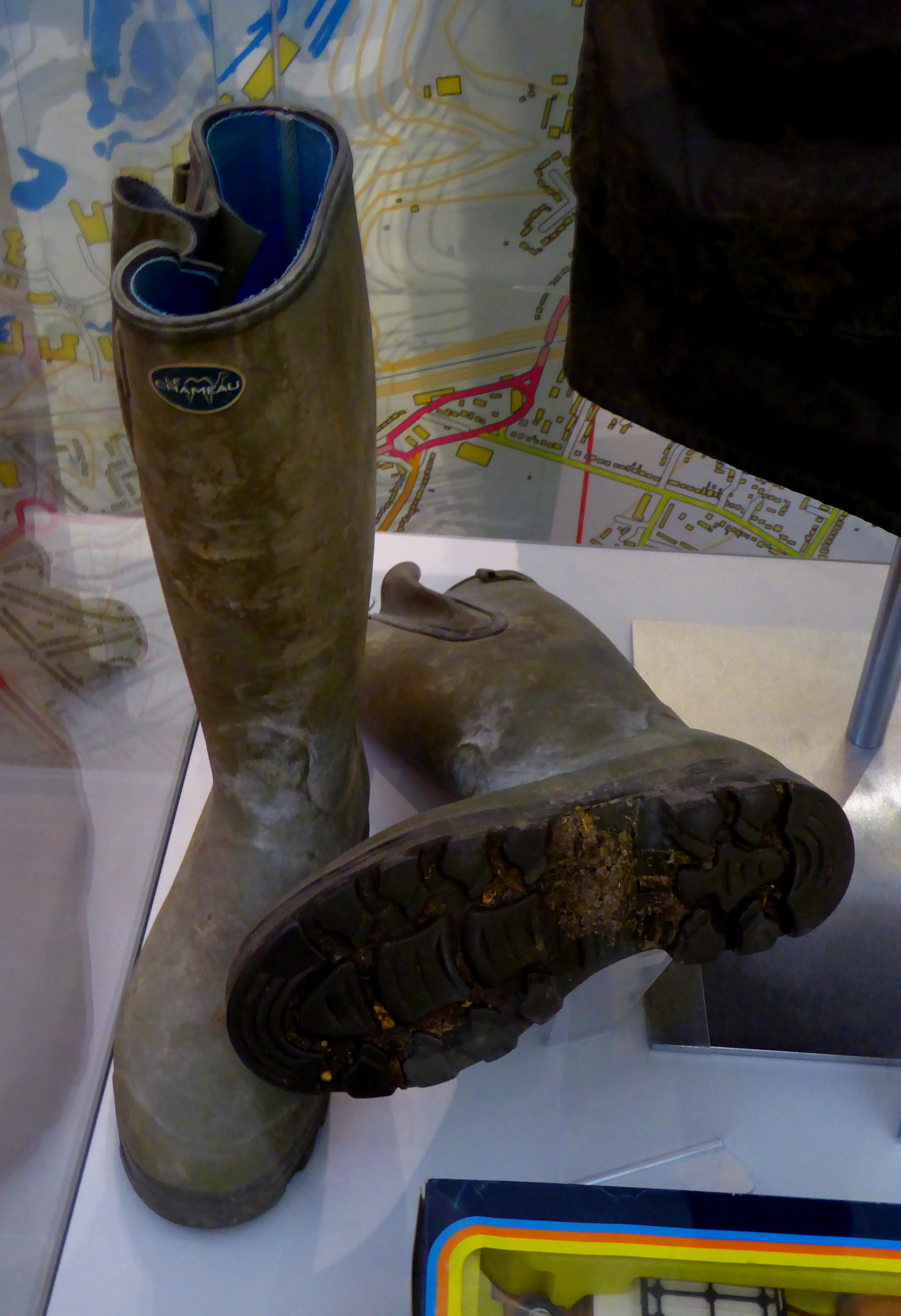
A pair of Eavis's Wellington boots on display at the Museum of English Rural Life in Reading

Eavis has apportioned profits from his Glastonbury Festival to support charitable causes, including local projects such as the restoration of the Tithe Barn, Pilton. In November 2008, during an appearance on the BBC Radio 4 programme Desert Island Discs, Eavis stated that the Festival could never lose its licence due to the contribution it makes to the local economy.

In 2009, Eavis starred in a short film to promote Somerset, commissioned by Inward Investment Agency Into Somerset.

Eavis served as vice-president (alongside Rebecca Pow MP) of Somerset Wildlife Trust until June 2018: he stepped down following an online petition criticising his support for badger culling. In response to the petition, Eavis claimed that signatories "probably live in Kensington" and had "never seen a badger".

== Honours and tributes ==
Eavis holds honorary degrees from the University of Bath (Doctor of Arts honoris causa, 2004) and the University of Bristol (Master of Arts honoris causa, 2006). In the 2007 Queen's Birthday Honours, he was appointed Commander of the Order of the British Empire (CBE) for services to music. He was appointed Knight Bachelor in the 2024 New Year Honours for services to music and charity.

In 2009 Eavis was nominated by Time magazine as one of the top 100 most influential people in the world. In 2012, he was awarded an honorary Master of Arts degree from the University for the Creative Arts.

In 2015 train operator First Great Western named High Speed Train powercar 43026 Michael Eavis. After this was withdrawn, 802013 was named after him in April 2019.

Eavis was awarded the Freedom of the Town of Glastonbury on 3 May 2022.

In early 2024 Eavis was knighted at Windsor Castle, by the Princess Royal, for services to music and charity.

== See also ==
- Max Yasgur, American farmer who hosted the Woodstock Festival in 1969
