= Pilton, Somerset =

Village and civil parish in Somerset, England

Coordinates: 51.1663°N 2.587°W

Pilton
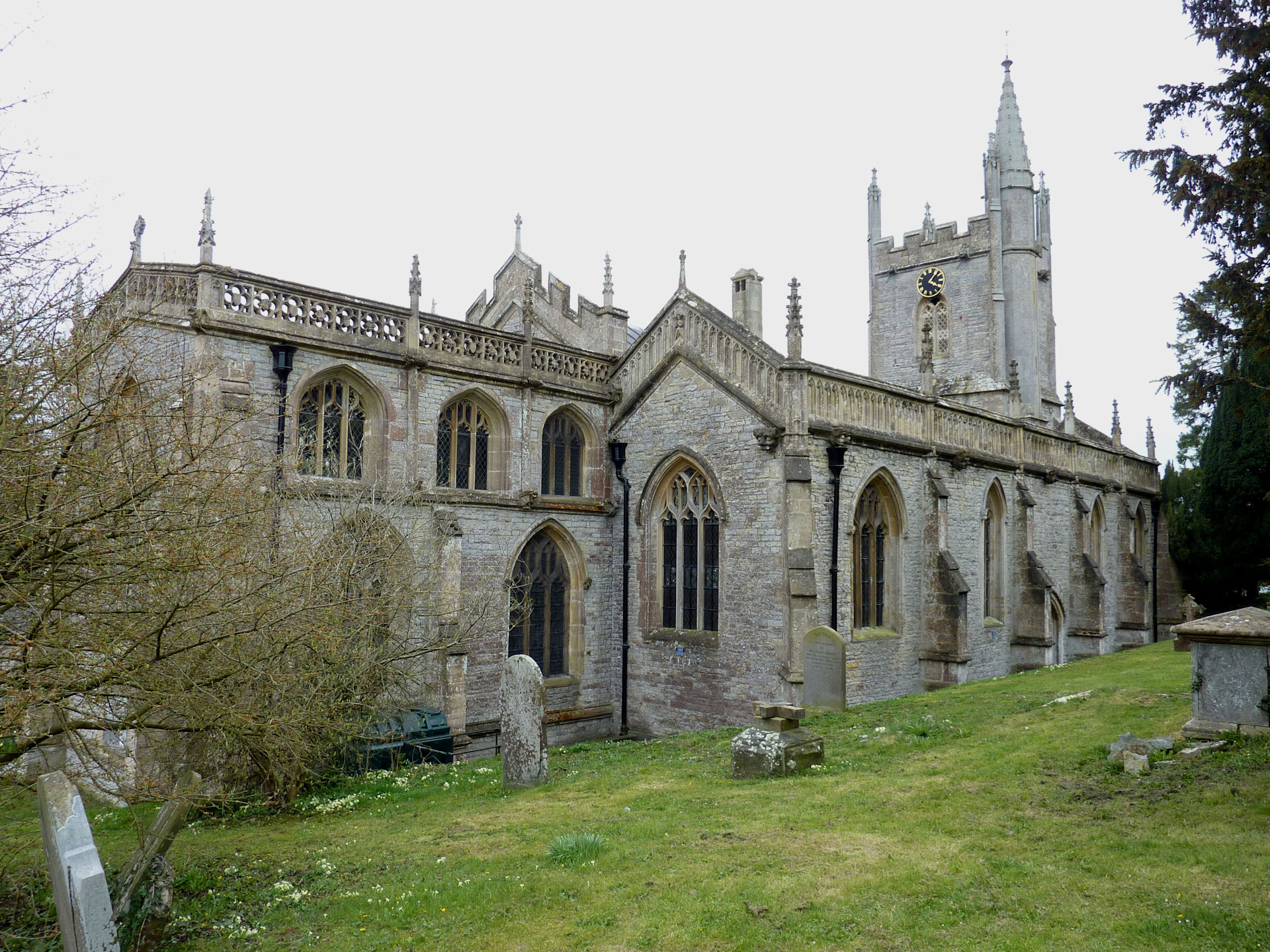
- Church of St John the Baptist, Pilton

- Location within Somerset
- Population: 998 (2011)
- OS grid reference: ST595405
- Unitary authority: Somerset Council
- Ceremonial county: Somerset
- Region: South West
- Country: England
- Sovereign state: United Kingdom
- Post town: SHEPTON MALLET
- Postcode district: BA4
- Dialling code: 01749
- Police: Avon and Somerset
- Fire: Devon and Somerset
- Ambulance: South Western
- UK Parliament: Wells and Mendip Hills

Pilton is a village and civil parish in Somerset, England, situated on the A361 road in the Mendip district, 3 miles (5 km) south-west of Shepton Mallet and 6 miles (10 km) east of Glastonbury. The village has a population of 998. The parish includes the hamlets of West Compton, East Compton, Westholme, Beardly Batch and Cannards Grave.

== History ==
Pilton is now almost 20 miles (30 km) from the sea but sits on the edge of the Somerset Levels, an area which has now been drained but was once a shallow tidal lake. According to legend in the 1st century, being a landing place then known as Pooltown, it is where Joseph of Arimathea landed in Britain. This is highly unlikely, as the suffix “ton” is Saxon, and therefore cannot be from before 450-500 AD at the earliest.

The parish of Pilton was part of the Whitstone Hundred.

Cannard's Grave is located on the southern edge of Shepton Mallet. Local legend (of which there are several versions) says that, in the 17th century, the publican of the local inn, Giles Cannard (possibly also known as Tom the Taverner), engaged in criminal activity such as robbing, or aiding and abetting the robbery of, his guests, theft, smuggling and possibly forgery. His activities having been discovered, he either committed suicide or was convicted and hanged from the gibbet at the adjacent crossroads and buried nearby. Other explanations of the name include a tale that Kenred a pagan and uncle of King Ine who converted to Christianity was buried there. Perhaps the most likely story is that a thief convicted of sheep stealing was tried and hanged at the site.

== Governance ==
The parish council has responsibility for local issues, including setting an annual precept (local rate) to cover the council’s operating costs and producing annual accounts for public scrutiny. The parish council evaluates local planning applications and works with the local police, district council officers, and neighbourhood watch groups on matters of crime, security, and traffic. The parish council's role also includes initiating projects for the maintenance and repair of parish facilities, as well as consulting with the district council on the maintenance, repair, and improvement of highways, drainage, footpaths, public transport, and street cleaning. Conservation matters (including trees and listed buildings) and environmental issues are also the responsibility of the council.

For local government purposes, since 1 April 2023, the parish comes under the unitary authority of Somerset Council. Prior to this, it was part of the non-metropolitan district of Mendip (established under the Local Government Act 1972). It was part of Shepton Mallet Rural District before 1974.

It is also part of the Wells and Mendip Hills county constituency represented in the House of Commons of the Parliament of the United Kingdom. It elects one Member of Parliament (MP) by the first past the post system of election.

== Church ==
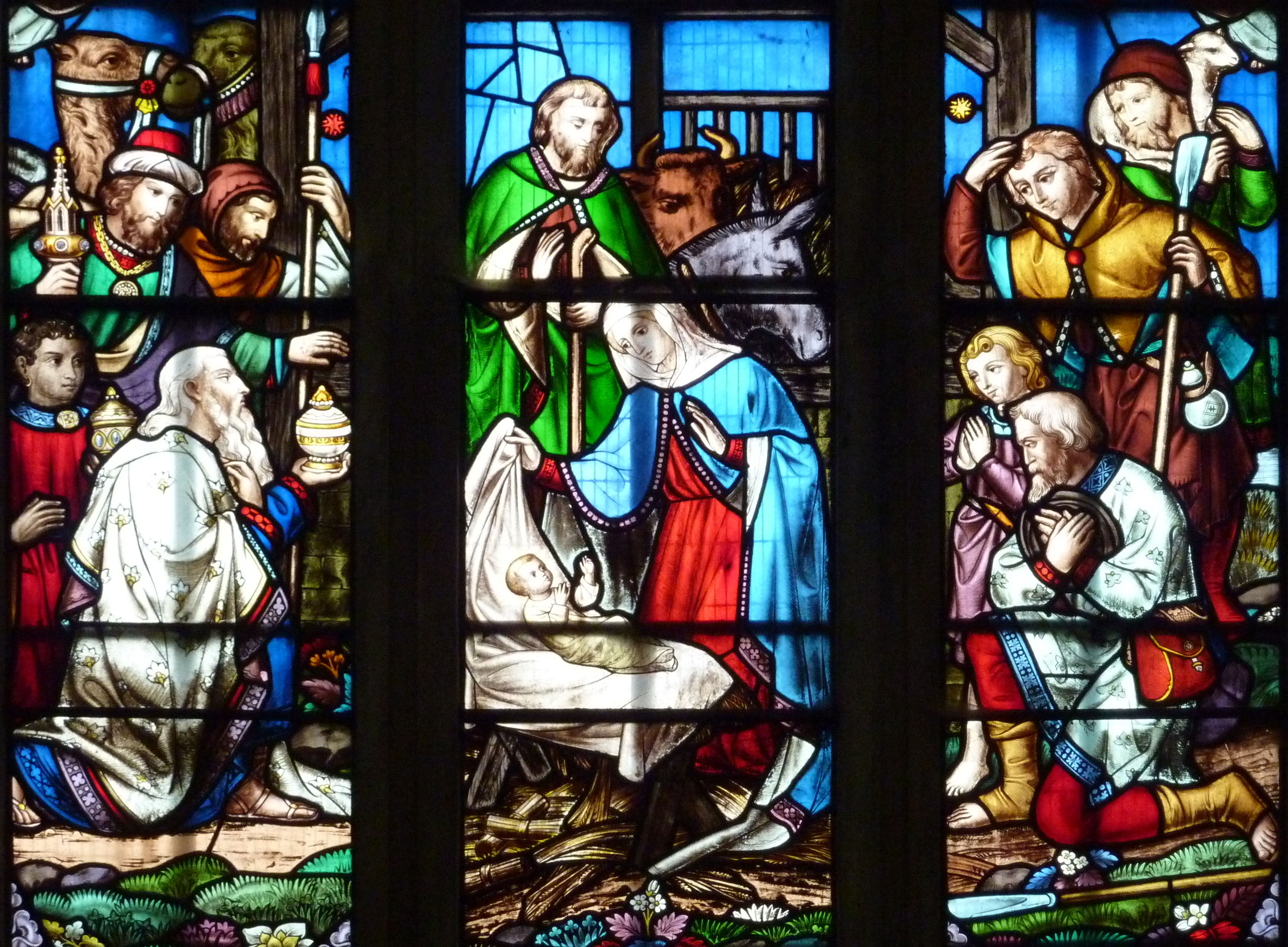
Stained glass window in St John's church

The present Medieval village church, dedicated to St John the Baptist, has been designated by English Heritage as a Grade I listed building.

== Listed buildings ==
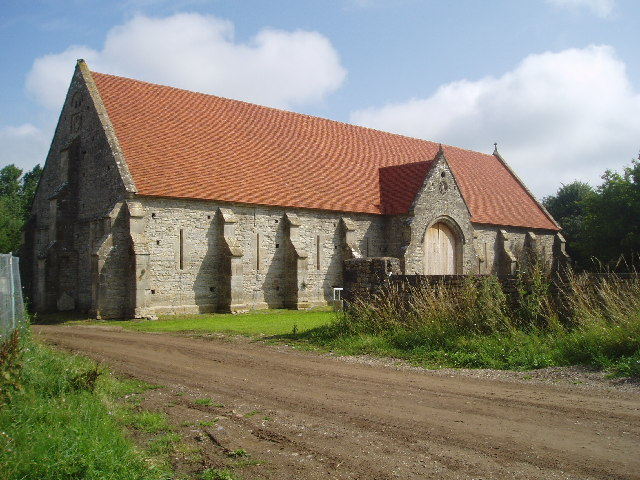
The Tithe Barn

The village has a Grade II* listed manor house and a Grade I listed tithe barn, which belonged to Glastonbury Abbey.

== Culture ==
Pilton is famous as the location of the Glastonbury Festival, which is run by Pilton farmer Michael Eavis and his daughter Emily Eavis. All villagers get a free ticket.
