= Glastonbury Festival line-ups =

Entertainers at the festival in Glastonbury, Somerset, England, listed by year

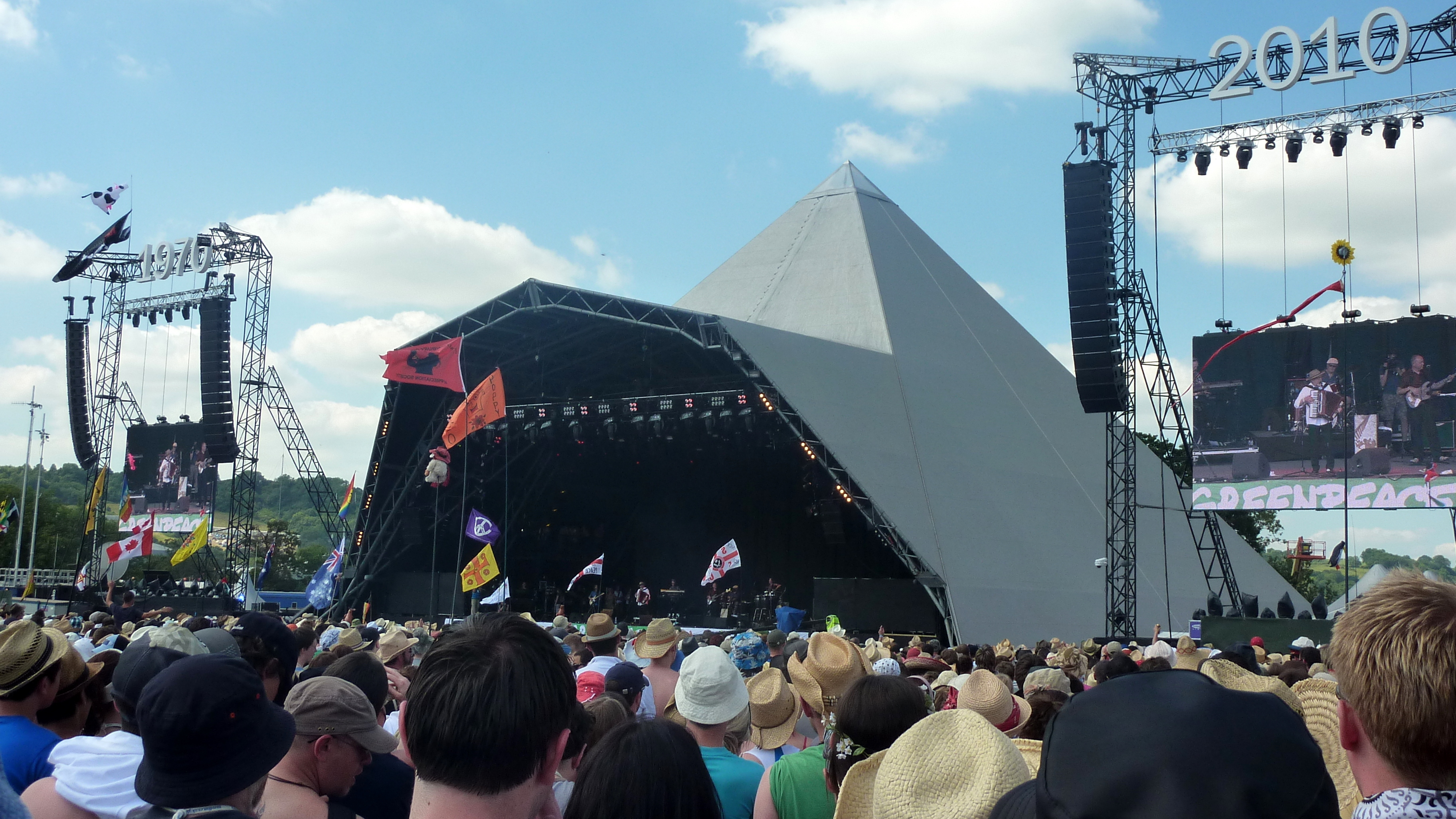
The Pyramid Stage in 2010

Glastonbury Festival is a greenfield music and performing arts festival on farm land near Pilton, England. It was first held in 1970 and has been held in the majority of years since then in the summer. Its line-up is diverse, including music, comedy, circus and theatre, taking place on many different stages and performance areas.

== 1970 ==
Line-up included:

- Tyrannosaurus Rex
- Amazing Blondel
- Ian A. Anderson
- Keith Christmas
- Quintessence
- Duster Bennett
- Sam Apple Pie
- Wayne Fontana
- Stackridge (Note: After the scheduled opening act failed to turn up, the band were the opening and closing act.)
- Steamhammer
- Al Stewart
- Planxty
- Marsupilami
- Roy Harper

== 1971 ==
Line-up included:

- Joan Baez
- David Bowie
- Edgar Broughton Band
- Arthur Brown
- Fairport Convention
- Family
- Gilberto Gil
- Gong
- Hawkwind
- Help Yourself
- Henry Cow
- Magic Michael
- Marsupilami
- Melanie
- Mighty Baby
- Pink Fairies
- Quintessence
- Terry Reid (w/ David Lindley and Linda Lewis)
- Brinsley Schwarz
- Traffic
- The Worthy Farm Windfuckers (house band feat. Thomas Crimble, Johnny Hodge and 'English' John Fox)

Pink Floyd were scheduled but were unable to perform as their equipment was stranded in Europe.

== 1977 ==
Known as a "free festival".

== 1978 ==
Known as the "impromptu festival".

- Nik Turner's Sphynx
- Nice n Easy
- White Island
- Pedro
- Motivation
- Tribe

== 1979 ==
Line-up included:

- Tim Blake
- Peter Gabriel w/ Phil Collins, Steve Hillage, Tom Robinson, Nona Hendryx and Alex Harvey
- Alex Harvey
- Steve Hillage
- Mother Gong
- Nik Turner's Sphynx
- The Only Ones
- Footsbarn Theatre
- Sky
- The Pop Group & The Slits
- The Leyton Buzzards
- John Martyn
- The Atoms – opening act

== 1980 ==
No festival, but Hawkwind supported by Vardis performed in the barn on 6 November as part of their Levitation tour.

== 1981 ==
Line-up included:

=== Pyramid stage ===
Friday	Saturday	Sunday
Ginger Baker's Nutters; Roy Harper; Robert Hunter; Stan Webb's Chicken Shack; Thompson Twins; Beverley Martyn	Hawkwind; New Order; Jazz Sluts; Matumbi; Decline and Fall; The Sound; John Cooper Clarke; Rab Noakes	Taj Mahal; Ronnie Lane's Slim Chance; Gordon Giltrap; Mother Gong; Supercharge

- Ronnie Lane's Slim Chance replaced Judie Tzuke who cancelled due to laryngitis.

== 1982 ==
Line-up included:

- Aswad
- Jackson Browne
- Roy Harper
- Van Morrison
- Judie Tzuke
- Randy California
- The Blues Band
- Richie Havens
- Sad Café
- Black Uhuru
- Steel Pulse
- The Chieftains
- Funkapolitan
- A Certain Ratio
- John Cooper Clarke
- Jean-Philippe Rykiel and Didier Malherbe plus members of Mother Gong
- Talisman
- Osibisa
- Climax Blues Band
- Ekome
- Steve Wally

Various artists were filmed for in-concert films that were later shown on UK TV. Broadcasts are confirmed for the Roy Harper Band, Randy California, Sad Café, and Osibisa.

== 1983 ==
Line-up included:

=== Pyramid stage ===
Friday	Saturday	Sunday
Melanie; Marillion; Jean-Philippe Rykiel	UB40; Aswad; The Beat; Moving Hearts; A Certain Ratio; The Enid; The Farm Band	King Sunny Ade & His African Beats; Curtis Mayfield; Fun Boy Three; The Chieftains; Incantation

Other acts that played included:

- Dennis Brown, w/ Aswad as backup band
- Alexis Korner
- Black Roots
- The Flying Pickets
- Tom Paxton

Julian Cope and James Brown were announced as playing but both withdrew in advance.

== 1984 ==
Line-up included:

=== Pyramid stage ===
Friday	Saturday	Sunday
Dr John; Ian Dury; Black Uhuru; Joan Baez; Hank Wangford; Billy Bragg	Elvis Costello And The Attractions; General Public; Amazulu; The Smiths; Brass Construction; Paul Brady; The Waterboys	Fela Kuti; Weather Report; Fairport Convention; John Martyn

Amazulu were scheduled to be the opening act on the Pyramid Stage on the Saturday, but did not arrive in time. They were subsequently given a slot before General Public, necessitating The Smiths to take the stage earlier than scheduled.

Elvis Costello And The Attractions were not announced as Saturday's headliners until a few days before the festival started, and too late to be credited in the official programme.

Ian Dury was backed by his then current band, The Music Students.

== 1985 ==
Line-up included:

=== Pyramid stage ===
Friday	Saturday	Sunday
Joe Cocker; King; Third World; Boomtown Rats; The Pogues; The Untouchables	Ian Dury and the Blockheads; The Style Council; Midnight Oil; Aswad; Working Week; New Model Army	Hugh Masekela; Echo & the Bunnymen; The Colourfield; John Martyn; Billy Bragg; Green On Red; The Triffids

=== Other stage ===
Friday	Saturday	Sunday
Black Roots; Somo Somo; El Sondro De Londres; Eduardo and Antonio; Son of Kolo; The Blue Aeroplanes; Jonathan Richman & The Modern Lovers; Solstice	Asaah Papa and Graffi Jazz; The Ariwa Posse; Poison Girls; Toxic Shock; Green on Red; Steve Payne & Guests; Eduardo and Antonio; The Happy End; OVA	Chevalier Brothers; Misty in Roots; Doctor and The Medics; Hank Wangford; The Men They Couldn't Hang; James; Microdisney; The Jazz Butcher; Doctor's Children; Rodney Allen

== 1986 ==
Line-up included:

=== Pyramid stage ===
Friday	Saturday	Sunday
Psychedelic Furs; Ruby Turner; The Pogues; The Waterboys; That Petrol Emotion; Amazulu; Howard Hughes and the Western Approaches	The Cure; Lloyd Cole and the Commotions; Black Uhuru and The Wailers; John Martyn; Loudon Wainwright III; Latin Quarter; Buddy Curtis and the Grasshoppers	Gil Scott-Heron; Level 42; Madness; Simply Red; Robert Cray; Christy Moore; The Housemartins

=== Stage Two ===
Friday	Saturday	Sunday
The Ariwa Posse; The Go-Betweens; 3 Mustaphas 3; The June Brides; Flairck; Phranc; Pauline Black & the Supernaturals; The Forest Hill-Billies; Fission Brothers	The Potato Five; The Dream Syndicate; Half Man Half Biscuit; Ted Chippington; We've Got a Fuzzbox and We're Gonna Use It; The Nightingales; Frank Chickens; Andy White; The Brilliant Corners; Zinica; The Wonderful Kiosk	The Bloodfire Posse; Rent Party; The Woodentops; The Mighty Lemon Drops; Billy Bragg; Sambatucada; Robyn Hitchcock & The Egyptians; Microdisney; Loudon Wainwright III; Terry and Gerry

== 1987 ==
Line-up included:

=== Pyramid stage ===
Friday	Saturday	Sunday
New Order; Julian Cope; Robert Cray; Ben E. King; Hüsker Dü; The Mighty Lemon Drops; World Party	Elvis Costello And The Attractions; Los Lobos; Richard Thompson; The Woodentops; Paul Brady; That Petrol Emotion; Rodney Allen	Taj Mahal; Van Morrison; The Communards; Courtney Pine; Trouble Funk; Michelle Shocked; The Proclaimers

=== Stage Two ===
Friday	Saturday	Sunday
El Sonido De Londres; The Smithereens; Robyn Hitchcock & The Egyptians; The Soup Dragons; The Oyster Band; Michelle Shocked; Andy Sheppard Quartet; Eduardo Niebla & Antonio Forcione; The Chesterfields; Rodney Allen; Automatic Dlamini	Misty In Roots; The Weather Prophets; The Triffids; The Chills; Green On Red; Real Sounds of Africa; The Blue Aeroplanes; The Jazz Defektors	Doctor and the Medics; Felt; Barrence Whitfield & the Savages; The Mekons; Gaye Bykers on Acid; Stump; Pop Will Eat Itself; The Brilliant Corners; The Tommy Chase Quartet; Head

== 1989 ==
Line-up included:

=== Pyramid stage ===
Friday	Saturday	Sunday
All About Eve; Suzanne Vega; The Wonder Stuff; Pixies; Throwing Muses; Lucinda Williams	Elvis Costello; The Proclaimers; Hothouse Flowers; Fairground Attraction; Van Morrison; Azido; Bhundu Boys	Fela Kuti; Mahlathini and the Mahotella Queens; Youssou N'Dour; The Waterboys; Steve Cooney & Seamus Begley; Black Uhuru; Martin Stephenson; Donovan & Friends

Adam Clayton of U2 joined Hot House Flowers onstage to play on "Feet on the Ground".

Georgie Fame was Van Morrison's keyboard player and played "Yeh, Yeh" before Morrison arrived onstage.

Peter Gabriel joined Youssou N'Dour onstage for one or more songs.

There was speculation in the music press, prior to the festival, that Donovan's "friends" would include big names, such as Paul McCartney and Eric Clapton. The "friends" turned out to be Ozric Tentacles.

Elvis Costello's set was solo.

All About Eve headlined Friday night due to a request by Suzanne Vega to switch the headline slot

== 1990 ==
Line-up as listed in the official programme:

=== Pyramid stage ===
Friday	Saturday	Sunday
Happy Mondays; Jesus Jones; Adamski; The Neville Brothers; Green on Red; Lush; Pale Saints; Galaxie 500	The Cure; Sinéad O'Connor; De La Soul; James; Del Amitri; Julian Cope (No show); Avalon Stompers	Ladysmith Black Mambazo; Aswad; Ry Cooder & David Lindley; Flaco Jiménez; Deacon Blue; Hothouse Flowers; Mano Negra; World Party

Archaos performed on top of the Pyramid after the Friday and Saturday night sets.

== 1991 ==
Due to security issues (hundreds of non-ticket holders breaching the fairly penetrable fences) and other problems from 1990, the festival was called off.

== 1992 ==
Line-up included:

=== Pyramid stage ===
Friday	Saturday	Sunday
Carter the Unstoppable Sex Machine; Levellers; Fishbone; Television; The Breeders; The Blue Aeroplanes; Senseless Things; Runrig; Kirsty MacColl; Hugh Cornwell	Shakespears Sister; Lou Reed; James (replacing Morrissey who cancelled); The Fall; The House of Love; The Saw Doctors; Ocean Colour Scene; Joan Armatrading; Chris Whitley; Mazlyn Jones	Youssou N'Dour; Maxi Priest; Tom Jones; Van Morrison; Buddy Guy; Richard Thompson; Billy Bragg and The Redstars; K Passa; Glastonbury Town Band

=== NME stage ===
Friday	Saturday	Sunday
Primal Scream; The Orb; Gary Clail; Jah Wobble; Flowered Up; Dr Phibes & the House of Wax Equations; Natural Life; The Moonflowers; Radical Dance Faction; Back To The Planet; Senser; Fat Dinosaur	The Shamen; Curve; Ozric Tentacles; Lush; Cud; Thousand Yard Stare; Catherine Wheel; Midway Still; The Sandkings; Th' Faith Healers; The Stairs; Bates Motel	808 State; Ned's Atomic Dustbin; Blur; Spiritualized; P J Harvey; The Frank and Walters; Kitchens of Distinction; The Family Cat; The Real People; The Belltower; Dodgy; Strangelove

=== Jazz stage ===
Friday	Saturday	Sunday
Lonnie Liston Smith; Olodum; Jim Mullen Quartet; Steve Williamson's That Suss Was Us; Nik Turner; Steve Arguelles; Joe Louis Walker; Space Waves; Soul In Motion	Kaoma; Chapter And The Verse; African Jazz Pioneers; Distant Cousins; Adrian Utley and Tammy Payne; Blurt; Martin Speake Quartet; Co Creators; Like Young	Negrocan; The Family Stand; Galliano; Dirty Dozen; Mouth Music; Secret Society; Chance Element; Magoma; Domino Club

=== Acoustic stage ===
Acts that weekend included Alison Moyet, Barenaked Ladies, Alias Ron Kavanagh, Baba Yaga, Richard Thompson, The Ukrainians, Robin Williamson,Sharon Shannon, Ivo Papasov, Julia Dawson.

== 1993 ==
Line-up included:

=== Pyramid Stage ===
Friday	Saturday	Sunday
The Black Crowes; Robert Plant; The Velvet Underground; Midnight Oil; Green On Red; The Tragically Hip; Rolf Harris; The 4 Of Us	The Kinks (replacing Red Hot Chili Peppers); Lenny Kravitz; Christy Moore; Hothouse Flowers; The Saw Doctors; Alison Moyet; Barenaked Ladies; Helena	Galliano; Wynton Marsalis; Baaba Maal; Van Morrison; Billy Bragg (replaced Nanci Griffith); Grant Lee Buffalo; Värttinä; The Brontë Brothers; Glastonbury Town Band

=== NME Stage ===
Friday	Saturday	Sunday
Suede; Teenage Fanclub; Belly; American Music Club; The Auteurs; Superchunk; The God Machine; Maldita Vecindad; The Stunning; Leatherface; The Wishplants; Chulm Factory	The Orb; Stereo MC's; Ozric Tentacles; Digable Planets; Jamiroquai; The Verve; Dodgy; Eat; The Rockingbirds; Adorable; Fat Dinosaur	Spiritualized; Porno For Pyros; The Lemonheads; Mega City Four; Come; Sebadoh; Back To The Planet; Dr Phibes & The House Of Wax Equations; Senser; Ultramarine; The Sea

=== Jazz Stage ===
Friday	Saturday	Sunday
James Taylor Quartet; Keziah Jones; Bheki Mseleku; McKoy; Transglobal Underground; Donette Forte And The Dub Warriors; Trevor Watts' Moiré Music Drum Orchestra; Mistura; Sound Advice	Roy Ayers; Digable Planets; Fourth World; Värttinä; Fun-Da-Mental; D'Influence; Co-Creators; Antonio Forcione; The Emperor's New Clothes; Rob Hall's Profusion	Baaba Maal; FFF; Urban Species; Omar; Fourth World; Najma; Protocol; Nitin Sawhney; Inner Sense Percussion Orchestra

=== Acoustic Stage ===
Friday	Saturday	Sunday
Goats Don't Shave; Eddi Reader; The McClusky Brothers; The Pale; The Ukrainians; Barenaked Ladies; The Black Velvet Band; Andy Davis; Chuck Prophet	The Blues Band; Lindisfarne; Paul Brady; The Brontë Brothers; Sharon Shannon; Darden Smith; Mouth Music; Tim Finn; Christine Collister; Dave Kelly	Donovan; John Prine; John Campbell; Christy And Jimmy; Wizards Of Twiddly; Christie Hennessy; Steve Phillips; Coal Porters; Don Mescalfe

== 1994 ==
Line-up included:

=== Pyramid Stage ===
Friday	Saturday	Sunday
The Levellers; Rage Against the Machine; Spin Doctors; World Party; Saint Etienne; Blind Melon; Ian McNabb; Dreadzone	Elvis Costello & The Attractions; Paul Weller; Nick Cave And The Bad Seeds; Galliano; Dwight Yoakam; Ride; Grant Lee Buffalo; Jah Wobble's Invaders Of The Heart; Little Axe	Peter Gabriel; Lucky Dube; James; Johnny Cash; Jackson Browne; The Lemonheads; Mary Black; Tindersticks; Glastonbury Town Band

=== NME Stage ===
Friday	Saturday	Sunday
The Pretenders; Manic Street Preachers; The Boo Radleys; Beastie Boys; Tool; L7; Green Apple Quick Step; Madder Rose; Luscious Jackson; dEUS; Wishplants; Re-Generation; Co-Creators	Orbital; Björk; M People; Apache Indian; Senser; Ultramarine; Transglobal Underground; Meshell Ndegeocello; African Head Charge; Dub Syndicate; Honky	Spiritualized; Blur; Radiohead; Inspiral Carpets; Pulp; Chumbawamba; Credit To The Nation; Oasis; Echobelly; Tiny Monroe; Rub Ultra; Burning Glass

=== Jazz Stage ===
Friday	Saturday	Sunday
Carleen Anderson; US3; Meshell Ndegeocello; The Sandals; FFF; Sierra Maestra; Jason Rebello; Sunchilde; Rivera Y Su Conjunto; Anita Carmichael	Jah Wobble's Invaders Of The Heart; Oui 3; Natacha Atlas; Julian Joseph; D*Note; Outside; Loop Guru; Pardesi Music Machine; The Ash Band; Batu	Steve Williamson; Urban Species; Oumou Sangare; Co-Creators; Lucky Dube; Joyce; Suns Of Arqa; Bloco Acorda Povo; Pan; Rory McLeod

=== Acoustic Stage ===
Friday	Saturday	Sunday
Man; Oyster Band; John Hiatt; Tom Robinson; Sharon Shannon; Trash Can Sinatras; Cheap Suit Oroonies; Bates Motel	Bootleg Beatles; Glenn Tilbrook; Iris DeMent; John Trudell; Horse; Melissa Ferrick; Andy White; Eleanor Shanley; Andy Davis	Gallagher and Lyle; Mary Black; Penguin Café Orchestra; The Brontë Brothers; Eleanor McEvoy; Subdudes; Pooka; Gorky's Zygotic Mynci; Reconciliation

== 1995 ==
Line-up included:

=== Pyramid stage ===
Friday	Saturday	Sunday
Oasis; The Black Crowes; Soul Asylum; Sinéad O'Connor; War; The Lightning Seeds; Ozric Tentacles; Senser; Spearhead	Pulp (replaced The Stone Roses); Orbital; PJ Harvey; Jamiroquai; The Boo Radleys; Jeff Buckley; Everything But The Girl; Indigo Girls; Dave Matthews Band	The Cure; Simple Minds; Page and Plant; Tanita Tikaram; The Saw Doctors; The Bootleg Beatles; Avalonian Free State Choir; Wincanton Town Band

=== NME stage ===
Friday	Saturday	Sunday
The Prodigy; The Offspring; Belly; Sleeper; Weezer; Supergrass; Dodgy; Skunk Anansie	The Shamen; Galliano; Urge Overkill; Spearhead; Live; Dreadzone; Ash; Shed Seven; Reef	Elastica; The Charlatans; The Verve; Veruca Salt; Gene; Menswear; Strangelove

also:

- The Chemical Brothers
- Massive Attack
- Tricky
- Plastikman
- Carl Cox
- Gil Scott-Heron (didn't show, replaced by Spearhead)
- Mike Scott
- Portishead
- Transglobal Underground
- Al Stewart
- Steeleye Span
- Evan Dando
- The Dolmen
- G Love and Special Sauce
- Autechre
- Eat Static

== 1997 ==
=== Pyramid stage ===
Friday	Saturday	Sunday
The Prodigy; The Smashing Pumpkins; Supergrass; Beck; The Levellers; Terrorvision; Echo & the Bunnymen; Phish	Radiohead; Ocean Colour Scene; Dodgy; Cast; Ray Davies; Nanci Griffith; The Longpigs; Republica; The Wannadies; Murray Lachlan Young	Ash (replaced Steve Winwood); Kula Shaker (replaced Neil Young); Sting; Van Morrison; Sheryl Crow; Billy Bragg; The Blue Nile; Donal Lunny; Glastonbury Town Band

=== Other stage ===
Friday	Saturday	Sunday
Reef; Ash; The Seahorses; Placebo; Stage started late due to extreme weather conditions; Shirehorses	Kula Shaker; The Chemical Brothers; Neneh Cherry; Dubstar; Stereolab; G Love & Special Sauce; Geneva; 60 Ft. Dolls; Dub War; Silver Sun; The Dharmas; Jonathan Fire*Eater; Scarfo; The Dolmen	The Bluetones; Mansun (who did not manage to sing a single song through, due to ongoing failures with the sound systems, and a sinking stage. They ran out of time and had to leave to allow the next band to set up); Echobelly; Live; Pavement; Super Furry Animals; Symposium; Three Colours Red; The Supernaturals; Gorky's Zygotic Mynci; Travis; Stereophonics; Perfume

Line-up also included:

- The Orb
- Roni Size
- Cheikh Lô & Youssou Ndour
- Daft Punk

== 1998 ==
=== Main stage ===
The headlining stage was not officially called the Pyramid Stage in 1998, as it did not have its distinctive pyramid shape.

Friday	Saturday	Sunday
Primal Scream; James; Foo Fighters; The Lightning Seeds; Finlay Quaye; Ben Harper; Taj Mahal; Gomez (replaced Beth Orton); My Life Story	Blur; Tricky; Robbie Williams; Mansun; Stereophonics; Tori Amos; Hothouse Flowers; Meredith Brooks; Jools Holland; Sharon Shannon	Pulp; Nick Cave and the Bad Seeds; Bob Dylan; Sonic Youth; Tony Bennett; Space; Steve Earle; Mediæval Bæbes; Town Band

=== Other stage ===
Friday	Saturday	Sunday
Embrace; Catatonia; Asian Dub Foundation (replaced Wyclef Jean); The Warm Jets; Ultrasound; Rocket from the Crypt; Matchbox 20; Rialto; The Supernaturals; The Montrose Avenue; The Young Offenders; Carrie; Medal; The Soundtrack of Our Lives	Underworld; Placebo; Deftones; Ben Folds Five; St Etienne; Monaco; Marion; Headswim; Kenickie; Catherine Wheel; A; Amanpondo	The Mescaleros feat. Joe Strummer & Bez DJ set; Spiritualized; Bernard Butler; Bentley Rhythm Ace; Audioweb; Alabama 3; The Mighty Mighty Bosstones; Feeder; Dust Junkys; Santa Cruz; Family of Free Love; Senser

=== New stage ===
Friday	Saturday	Sunday
Ian Brown; Gorky's Zygotic Mynci; Unbelievable Truth; Dawn of the Replicants; Six by Seven; Kristin Hersh; Scott 4; wireless; Laika; Doves; Clinic; Edible Decorations; Brave State	Cornershop; Jesus and Mary Chain; Gomez; Drugstore; theaudience; Shack (unable to play); Sunhouse; Idlewild; Llama Farmers; Counter Mine; Ooberman; Hither Green People	Divine Comedy; The Aloof; Red Snapper; Sean Lennon; Earl Brutus; Boom Boom Satellites; Eliza Carthy; Superstar; Magoo; Coade; Moorhaven; Bates Motel

=== Jazzworld stage ===
Friday	Saturday	Sunday
Portishead; Cornershop; Faithless; Dissidenten; James Taylor Quartet; Bim Sherman; Red Snapper; Purple Penguin; President Bongo & The Democratic Republic of Phonque	Reprazent; The Roots; Amanpondo feat. Juno Reactor; Morcheeba; Common; Outside; James Hardway; Akasha; J-Life; Zoot & Guests	D'Influence; Herbie Hancock and the Headhunters; Dr. John; Terry Callier; Trilok Gurtu & The Glimpse; Tortoise; Keith Waithe & The Macusi Players; Dr. Didg; Hiroki Okano & The Tenkoo Orchestra

=== Dance tent ===
Friday	Saturday	Sunday
The Chemical Brothers; Moby; Billy Nasty; Luke Slater Freek Funk Live; Darren Emerson; Monkey Mafia; Cut La Roc/Midfield General; Fluke; Mrs Wood DJ; Girl Eats Boy; DJ Greg Roberts; Medicine Drum; DJ John Little; Fil Planet	Richie Hawtin AKA Plastik Man; Lo Fidelity Allstars; Fatboy Slim; Adam F; DJ Freddy Fresh; Coldcut; Way Out West; Scratch Perverts; Banco de Gaia; King Kooba; Spring Heel Jack; Kid Loops; Autechre; DJ Leon; Finitribe; Starecase	Mad Professor Digital and live vocals; Roni Size + MC Dynamite DJ Set; Freestylers; Kenny Ken/DJ Rap; Les Rhythmes Digitales; DJ Touche; Kitachi; DJs John Stapleton/Krash Slaughta; Dub Pistols; Environmental Science DJs; More Rockers; Agent Dan DJ; Conemelt; DJ Bart

Lineup also included:

- Babybird
- Bernard Butler
- Julian Cope
- Rolf Harris
- Taj Mahal & The Phantom Blues Band
- Ozric Tentacles
- Eddi Reader
- Salsa Celtica
- Squeeze

== 1999 ==
=== Pyramid stage ===
Friday	Saturday	Sunday
R.E.M.; Beautiful South; Hole; Bush; Blondie; Barenaked Ladies; Björn Again	Manic Street Preachers; Underworld; Texas; Ash; Joe Strummer & The Mescaleros; Beth Orton; Eliza Carthy; Billy Bragg; Younger Younger 28s	Skunk Anansie; Fun Lovin' Criminals; Lenny Kravitz; The Corrs; Al Green; Yothu Yindi; Delirious?; London Community Gospel Choir

(Björn Again moved up the bill to replace Ian Dury & The Blockheads, who cancelled their appearance due to illness)

=== Other stage ===
Friday	Saturday	Sunday
Kula Shaker; Gomez; Pavement; Wilco; dEUS; Gay Dad; Heather Nova; Queens of the Stone Age; Everlast; Moke; Doves	Paul Oakenfold; Cast; Super Furry Animals; The Cardigans; Travis; The Creatures; Hurricane #1; Straw; Mishka; Fungus; Witness	Mogwai; Mercury Rev; Tindersticks; Feeder; The Delgados; Dogstar; Electrasy; Snowpony; Dr Didg; Toploader; Glastonbury Town Band

Lineup also included:

- Burning Spear {World Stage}
- Coldplay (New Tent)
- Doves (New Tent)
- David Gray (New Tent)
- Merz (New Tent)

== 2000 ==
=== Pyramid stage ===
Friday	Saturday	Sunday
The Chemical Brothers; Macy Gray; Counting Crows; Cypress Hill; The Bluetones; Live; G. Love & Special Sauce (replaced Eagle-Eye Cherry); The Wailers	Travis; Pet Shop Boys; Ocean Colour Scene; Reef; Semisonic; Brand New Heavies; Asian Dub Foundation; Ladysmith Black Mambazo; Joseph Arthur	David Bowie; Embrace; Happy Mondays; Willie Nelson; David Gray (replaced Burt Bacharach); Jools Holland; Sharon Shannon; Yeovil Town Band

=== Other stage ===
Friday	Saturday	Sunday
Nine Inch Nails; Moby; The The; Idlewild; Bloodhound Gang; Methods of Mayhem; Fu Manchu; A Perfect Circle; Cay; Rico	Leftfield; Death in Vegas; Elastica; Feeder; Wannadies; David Gray; Coldplay; Toploader; Soulwax; Clinic; Crashland	Basement Jaxx; Beta Band; Muse; The Dandy Warhols; Susan McKeown; St Etienne; Dark Star; Badly Drawn Boy (replaced The For Carnation); Jack Lukeman; Wilt; The Blue Aeroplanes; Mo Solid Gold

== 2002 ==
=== Pyramid stage ===
Friday	Saturday	Sunday
Coldplay (replaced The Strokes); Faithless; Ash; Nelly Furtado; Doves; The Dandy Warhols; Bush; Alabama 3; Shibusashirazu Orchestra	Stereophonics; The Charlatans; The White Stripes; Starsailor; Ian Brown; No Doubt; Jools Holland; Ani di Franco; Dreadzone	Rod Stewart; Roger Waters; Isaac Hayes; Badly Drawn Boy; Super Furry Animals; Manu Chao; Rolf Harris; Avalonian Free State Choir; Town Band

=== Other stage ===
Friday	Saturday	Sunday
Garbage; Spiritualized; Mercury Rev; Queens of the Stone Age; Lostprophets; Idlewild; Cooper Temple Clause; Ed Harcourt; Vex Red; Ikara Colt (swapped with Dropkick Murphys)	Orbital; Beta Band; Less Than Jake; The Vines; Rival Schools; Electric Soft Parade; Haven; The Coral; The Parkinsons; The Shining; Dog	Air; Groove Armada; Belle and Sebastian; Elbow; Black Rebel Motorcycle Club; Hundred Reasons; New Model Army; My Vitriol; The Soundtrack of Our Lives; Dropkick Murphys (swapped with Ikara Colt); Simon Kaye

Line-up also included:

- Spearhead

== 2003 ==
=== Pyramid stage ===
Friday	Saturday	Sunday
R.E.M.; David Gray; Suede; The Music (replaced Zwan); Mogwai; De La Soul; Echo & the Bunnymen; Inspiral Carpets; The Darkness	Radiohead; The Flaming Lips; Supergrass; Turin Brakes; The Polyphonic Spree; Jimmy Cliff; Jools Holland; Ozomatli; Ben Andrews	Moby; Manic Street Preachers; Feeder; Macy Gray; Sugababes; Asian Dub Foundation; Waterboys; Leningrad Cowboys; Yeovil Town Band

=== Other stage ===
Friday	Saturday	Sunday
Primal Scream; Röyksopp; Idlewild; Electric Six; Cooper Temple Clause; Yo La Tengo; Tom McRae; Athlete; Pete Yorn; Nada Surf; Har Mar Superstar; The Jeevas	Super Furry Animals; The Coral; Love with Arthur Lee; The Libertines; Interpol; The Eighties Matchbox B-Line Disaster; The Thrills; Sparta; Gemma Hayes; 22-20s; Burn; DNA Doll	Doves; Sigur Rós; Dave Gahan; Grandaddy; The Rapture; The Raveonettes; Damien Rice; Sugarcult; My Morning Jacket; Simple Kid; The Gathering; The Rain Band

Line-up also included:

- Yes
- The Streets
- The Delgados
- Bill Bailey (Cabaret Tent)
- Ross Noble (Cabaret Tent)
- Kings of Leon (New Bands Tent)

== 2004 ==
=== 2004 Pyramid stage ===
Friday	Saturday	Sunday
Oasis; Kings of Leon; PJ Harvey; Groove Armada; Elbow; Nelly Furtado; Wilco; Bright Eyes; Ralph Myerz and the Jack Herren Band	Paul McCartney; The Black Eyed Peas; Starsailor; Ben Harper; Lostprophets; Scissor Sisters; Spearhead; Sister Sledge; Taima	Muse; Morrissey; Supergrass (replaced The Libertines); James Brown; Christy Moore; Joss Stone; Dennis Locorriere; English National Opera; Glastonbury Town Band; ENO Rehearsal

=== 2004 Other stage ===
Friday	Saturday	Sunday
Chemical Brothers; Goldfrapp; Franz Ferdinand; Snow Patrol; Badly Drawn Boy (replaced Jet); The Rapture; I Am Kloot; The Stands; Hal (replaced Billy Talent); Kasabian	Basement Jaxx; Damien Rice; Von Bondies; British Sea Power; My Morning Jacket; Keane; Simple Kid; 22-20's; The Duke Spirit; Rilo Kiley; The Subways	Orbital; Black Rebel Motorcycle Club; Belle & Sebastian; Gomez; The Eighties Matchbox B-Line Disaster; The Ordinary Boys; Divine Comedy; The Zutons; Razorlight; The Choir

=== 2004 Dance tent ===
Friday	Saturday	Sunday
Dave Clarke; Kosheen; Fergie; Chicks on Speed; Tim Deluxe; Atomic Hooligan; Mylo; 100% ISIS & Aroma Jockey OD07; The Outlaws; Dark Chunk; DJ Salty; Cakeboy; DJ Miss Minty	Sister Sledge; Fatback Band; DJ Diggz; Scissor Sisters; Soultrain DJs; Soul II Soul Soundsystem; Soultrain DJs; Gwen Dickey's Rose Royce; Soultrain DJs; Earth Wind For Hire; Soultrain DJs; DJ Taylor	Ozomatli; Future World Funk; Goldie Lookin' Chain; Future World Funk (DJ set); Daara J; Future World Funk (DJ set); Ty; Stanton Warriors; The Loose Cannons; DubDadda; Skinnyman & DJ Flip; DJ Parker; Redrama; Plan B

=== 2004 New tent ===
Friday	Saturday	Sunday
Spiritualized; The Bees; Mark Gardener; Electrelane; Minuteman; Chikinki; Concretes; Grand Transmitter; The Walkmen; South; The Experimental Pop Band; Halima; Once Under	Zero 7; Tim Booth; Hope of the States; The Killers; Chikinki; Longview; Carina Round; Marjorie Fair; Dogs Die in Hot Cars; Gisli; Blackbud; Milk Teeth; The Others	Television; stellastarr*; Delays; The Raveonettes; Ian McNabb; Buck 65; The Open; Ella Guru; Gonga; The Golden Virgins; Fiction Plane; Broken Dolls; James Blunt

=== 2004 Jazzworld stage ===
Friday	Saturday	Sunday
Michael Franti & Spearhead; Ojos De Brujo; Lucky Dube; Soulive; The Magic Band; Da Lata; Blurt; Spree; Babyhead	Toots & the Maytals; Jamie Cullum; Joss Stone; Antibalas; Amp Fiddler; Asere; The Angel Brothers; The Quantic Soul Orchestra; Mosiamo	Roy Ayers; Bonnie Raitt; Amy Winehouse; Mikey Dread; Trio Mocotó; When Worlds Collide; Tinariwen; Fernanda Porto; Taima

=== 2004 Acoustic stage ===
Friday	Saturday	Sunday
Tindersticks; Love with Arthur Lee; The Kilfenora Ceili Band; Justin Adams & The Wayward Sheiks; Jerry Fish and the Mudbug Club; Taima; Lisa Mills; Paul Armfield & The Four Good Reasons	Hothouse Flowers; The Rutles; Hot Club of Cowtown; The Long Ryders; Josh Rouse; The Sadies; Michael Weston King; Bodixa	Suzanne Vega; Simon Fowler & Oscar Harrison (OCS); John Cooper Clarke; Cara Dillon; Simple Kid; Jerry Fish and the Mudbug Club; Obi; Waking the Witch

=== 2004 Avalon stage ===
Friday	Saturday	Sunday
The Levellers (acoustic); Lamb; Jelitara Futa; Baghdaddies; Moksha; Blackbud; Tamra; Oi Va Voi	1 Giant Leap; Slovo; Love Grocer; Hazel O'Connor; Show of Hands; Martin Furey; Loonaloop; Matt Sage; Resonators	Adrian Sherwood; Space Ritual; Ging; Six By Seven; Here & Now; Far Cue; Blue States; The Matzos; Astrid Williamson

=== 2004 The Glade ===
Thursday	Friday	Saturday	Sunday
Alucid Nation; A Man Called Adam; Hybrid; Hyper; Elite Force; Clever Bunny (Live); Tigger; David Jack (Live); Bitesize; Tom Real; Pete Jordan; Scratchy; High Eight; James Gill	London Dust Explosion; Drunk Soul Brother; Freq Nasty (live); Rennie Pilgrem (DJ); Infusion (live); Meat Katie (DJ); Name: (live); Will White (DJ); Future Funk Squad (live); Krafty Kutz; Modeliser (live); Nick Warren (DJ); LP (live); Capoeira Twins (DJ); Acarine (live)	Flat-E; Bonobo; Plaid (live / DJ); Squarepusher (live); DJ AFX; DJD (DJ); The Egg (live); James Holden; DimnD & Juan Thyme (live); Ned; Toob (live); Matt Herbert; Patthan; Clever Bunny (live); XAN	System 7; Tristan; Eat Static; Eskimo; Ans; Protoculture; Hyrophonic; James Monroe; Hallucinogen in Dub; Grantlee

== 2005 ==
=== Pyramid stage ===
Friday	Saturday	Sunday
The White Stripes; The Killers; Doves; Elvis Costello; The Zutons; The Thrills; John Butler Trio; The Undertones; The Subways (cancelled due to flooding); Adjágas (cancelled due to flooding)	Coldplay; New Order; Keane; The Coral; Ash; Kaiser Chiefs; Goldie Lookin' Chain; Taj Mahal; Hayseed Dixie	Basement Jaxx (replaced Kylie Minogue); Primal Scream; Garbage; Brian Wilson; Van Morrison; Jools Holland; James Blunt; Bellydance Superstars & The Desert Roses; Yeovil Town Band

=== Other stage ===
Friday	Saturday	Sunday
Fatboy Slim; Röyksopp; Bloc Party; Babyshambles; The Others; Hot Hot Heat; Editors; The Black Velvets; Tom Vek; Blackbud (cancelled due to flooding); The Dead 60s (cancelled due to flooding)	Razorlight; Kasabian; Interpol; Echo & the Bunnymen; The Futureheads; Athlete; KT Tunstall; The Stands; Modey Lemon; Engineers; The Deadbeats	Ian Brown; The La's; Rufus Wainwright; The Bravery; The Dears; Soulwax; Ambulance LTD (replaced Cake); Thirteen Senses; Brendan Benson; Martha Wainwright; Red Hand Band

=== John Peel stage ===
Friday	Saturday	Sunday
The Tears; Willy Mason; M.I.A.; The Secret Machines; Be Your Own Pet; M83; Yourcodenameis:milo; Maxïmo Park; Nine Black Alps; El Presidente – No show; Infadels; Countermine; The Boyfriends	The Go! Team; The Magic Numbers; The Earlies; The Longcut; The Subways; Rilo Kiley; The Departure; The Rakes; Art Brut; Morning Runner; Mad Staring Eyes; Outset; Once Under; Boa	Ryan Adams (cancelled); Bright Eyes; LCD Soundsystem; HARD-Fi (cancelled due to the death of Richard Archer's mother); The Kills; Jem; Sons and Daughters; The Dresden Dolls; Client; Gear; Sek Loso; Sucker

=== Jazzworld stage ===
Friday	Saturday	Sunday
Roy Ayers; Roots Manuva; Alabama 3; Nigel Kennedy Jazz Project feat. Jarek Śmietana and Z-Star; Tyler James; Kokolo; Dennis Rollins' Badbone & Co; Terry Reid; Moya	Baaba Maal feat. Daande Lenol; Seeed; Róisín Murphy; Taj Mahal Trio; Amaparanoia; G.Love; The Levellers; Ilham Al Madafal; Players	Femi Kuti & The Positive Force; The Wailers; Zap Mama; Temple of Sound; Bellydance Superstars & The Desert Roses; DJ Dolores: Aparelhagem; Youngblood Brass Band; Ska Cubano; Jaipur Kawa Brass Band

=== Acoustic stage ===
Friday	Saturday	Sunday
Steve Earle; Paul Brady; Henry McCullough; Battlefield Band; Declan O'Rourke; Allison Moorer; Mike Whellans One Man Blues Band; Ralfe Band; Clayhill; Tiny Tin Lady	Steve Harley & Cockney Rebel; Paddy Casey; Jerry Fish and the Mudbug Club; The Backbeat Beatles; Glenn Tilbrook & The Fluffers; Chas & Dave; London Lasses; I Am Kloot; The Deadbeats; Martha Wainwright	The Beautiful South; Tori Amos; Dave Edmunds; London Community Gospel Choir; The Ukulele Orchestra of Great Britain; Patty Griffin; David Kitt; Rodrigo y Gabriela; Amos Lee; Whalebone Polly

=== Dance village ===
Stage	Friday	Saturday	Sunday
East Coast Stage	The Chemical Brothers; Justin Robertson; Two Lone Swordsmen; James Holroyd; Nathan Detroit; Adam Smith; Bodyrockers; Evil Nine; Cakeboy	Darren Emerson; DJ Marky, DJ Patife & Stamina MC; Goldie Lookin' Chain; Abdominal & D-Sisive; Timo Maas; Way Out West; James Lavelle; Ozric Tentacles; Vagabond Boogaloo; Lunaloop; Tom Real vs The Rogue Element	2 Many DJs; Freestylers; Skinnyman & DJ Flip; Mylo; Diggz with Rodney; Terri Walker; Youngblood Brass Band; Benji B (3 separate performances); Quantic Soul Orchestra; Diggz
West Coast Stage	Stereo MC's; 808 State; System 7; Michael Dog; Eat Static; Kube 72; Ellen Allien; ZubZub; London Elektricity; Zinc; High Contrast; Friction; The Blackout; (Silent disco ran after live music finished)	Hexstatic; Dreadzone; Layo & Bushwacka!; The Bays; Tayo (2 separate performances); Mad Professor Dub Show; Rennie Pilgrem presents TCR AllStars; Stanton Warriors; The Beat; Jon Moore; Hallucinogen In Dub; Scratchy; Tetchi; Aural Imbalance; Breakfast with Howard	Lord Gosh; Plump DJs; BT; Zen TV; Banco de Gaia; Phil K; Atomic Hooligan; Sharem Jey; Jamie Lidell; Celloman/Urban Soul Orchestra; DJ Monkey Pilot; (Silent disco ran after live music finished)

=== Avalon stage ===
Friday	Saturday	Sunday
Oysterband; Justin Sullivan and Dean White; Eliza Carthy & The Ratcatchers; Terry Reid; Los Albertos; North Cregg; Polly Paulusma; Tarantism	Peatbog Faeries; The Proclaimers; Hayseed Dixie; Rory McLeod; Session A9; Kangaroo Moon; Martha Tilston; The Broken Family Band; The Huckleberries	Shooglenifty; Sharon Shannon; Eddi Reader; The Baghdaddies; Baka Beyond; Leon Hunt & Daily Planet; Dragonsfly; Seize the Day; Mahatma

=== Left field ===
Friday	Saturday	Sunday
British Sea Power; Sonic Audio; Buck 65; The Rakes	Babyshambles; Estelle; The Others; Agent Blue	Billy Bragg; Steve Earle; Retrospect

=== Poetry and words ===
- Jah Biggz
- Bonnie Brookes
- Brendan the Pop Poet
- Penny Broadhurst
- Rosie Carrick
- Carol Ann Duffy
- Pete Eldridge
- Giovanni Esposito
- Nathan Filer
- Helen Gregory
- Yasmine Haideman
- Will Hames
- Love Fairies
- Gilly the Nun
- Anna Lindup
- Malign Interlect
- Harry Man
- Paul Marshall
- Annie McGann
- Elvis McGonagall
- Kate Noakes
- Rachel Pantechnicon
- Phaze
- Polar Bear Ninja
- Pat VT West
- Leeanne Stoddart
- Eliana Tomkins
- Kimberley Trusty
- Tony Walsh
- James Windsor
- Yam Boy and Mango

== 2007 ==
=== Pyramid stage ===
Friday	Saturday	Sunday
Arctic Monkeys; Kasabian; The Fratellis; Bloc Party; The Magic Numbers; Amy Winehouse; Gogol Bordello; The Earlies; The View; Adjágas	The Killers; The Kooks; Paul Weller; Paolo Nutini; Lily Allen; Dirty Pretty Things; Guillemots; The Pipettes; Seasick Steve; Liz Green	The Who; Kaiser Chiefs; Manic Street Preachers; Dame Shirley Bassey; James Morrison; The Marley Brothers present the 30th anniversary of Exodus; The Waterboys; Corb Lund; National Youth Orchestra

=== Other stage ===
Friday	Saturday	Sunday
Björk; Arcade Fire; Rufus Wainwright; The Coral; Super Furry Animals; Bright Eyes; The Automatic; Modest Mouse; The Cribs; Reverend and the Makers; Mr Hudson & The Library	Iggy & The Stooges; Editors; Maxïmo Park; Babyshambles; Klaxons; CSS; Biffy Clyro; The Long Blondes; Brakes; El Presidente; Switches	The Chemical Brothers; The View; The Go! Team; Mika; The Rakes; Get Cape, Wear Cape, Fly; Cold War Kids; The Sunshine Underground; The Enemy; The Holloways; Kharma 45

=== John Peel stage ===
Friday	Saturday	Sunday
Hot Chip; The Maccabees; Mumm-Ra; Jack Penate; The Hold Steady; The New Pornographers; Tokyo Police Club; Good Shoes; The Annuals; Disco Ensemble; Fear of Music; Look See Proof	The Twang; Get Cape, Wear Cape, Fly; Patrick Wolf; Bat for Lashes; The Pigeon Detectives; Calvin Harris; You Say Party! We Say Die!; Holy Fuck; The Rushes; The Hours; Grim Northern Social; Blue Bullet	The Gossip; Jamie T; Just Jack; Mark Ronson; Scott Matthews; The Young Knives; The Rumble Strips; The Horrors; The Noisettes; Tiny Dancers; Aqualung; Shoot the Moon

=== Jazzworld stage ===
Friday	Saturday	Sunday
Damian "Junior Gong" Marley; Amy Winehouse; Toumani Diabaté's Symmetric Orchestra; AIM; GusGus; Nasio Fontaine; Soweto Kinch; MIDIval Punditz featuring Karsh Kale and special guests; Guilty Pleasures featuring The Tor Dogs and special guests	Rodrigo y Gabriela; John Fogerty; Guillemots; Mr Hudson & The Library; K'Naan; Hiromi's Sonicbloom; The Bees; Soil & "Pimp" Sessions; Ganga Giri; Forty Thieves Orkestar	Corinne Bailey Rae; Fat Freddy's Drop; Amp Fiddler; Beirut; Tinariwen; Seth Lakeman; Koop; Mahala Rai Banda; Babyhead; Feluka

=== Acoustic stage ===
Friday	Saturday	Sunday
Damien Rice; Hothouse Flowers; Sandi Thom; Jack L; Lisa Hannigan; The Dylan Project; Pauline Scanlon; Emmy The Great; Newton Faulkner; Martha Tilston	The Waterboys; Nick Lowe; Eric Bibb; The Men They Couldn't Hang; Liam Ó Maonlaí; The Storys; Catherine Feeny; Liz Green; Hayley Hutchinson	The Bootleg Beatles; KT Tunstall; Moya Brennan; LCG Choir; Steve Forbert; Songs of Nick Drake performed by Keith James; David Saw; The Winding Stair; Hummingbird; The Epstein

=== Dance village ===
Stage	Friday	Saturday	Sunday
East Coast Stage	Fatboy Slim; Klaxons; GusGus; Simian Mobile Disco; Max Sedgley; Hyper; Thomas Gandey; !!!; Buraka Som Sistema; Uncle Buck; XX Teens (formerly Xerox Teens)	Mr Scruff; Mika; Mark Ronson; DJ Yoda; Sugadaddy; Infadels; Tim Deluxe; The Black Ghosts; Phil Kieran; Devil's Gun	Carl Cox; Pendulum; Dave Clarke; Vitalic; The Glimmers; Shitdisco; Kissy Sell Out; Elektrons; Zero dB; Dragonette; Polichinelle
West Coast Stage	Trentemøller live; Danny Howells; System 7; Surgeon AV Show; Eat Static; Jim Masters; A Guy Called Gerald; James Gill; Ralph Myerz and The Jack Herren Band; Alloy Mental; Subgiant; Kava Kava; Marc Vedo; Plump DJs; Rennie Pilgrem and MC Chickaboo; Adam Freeland; General Midi and MC Jakes; D. Ramirez; Dumb Blonde; Tom Real Vs The Rogue Element; Quest; Atomic Hooligan and Jay Cunning; The Breakfastaz; Ben & Lex; Plaza De Funk	Sasha; Hybrid; Mr C; Meat Katie and VJ Anyone; Überzone; DJ Hal; The Bays; Will Saul; Neville Staple Band; Pama International; Kenji Williams; Breakfast with Howard Marks	Krafty Kuts; Coldcut; Steve Lawler; Dreadzone; Bitesize; Crazy P; Stanton Warriors; Phil Hartnoll presents Long Range; Future Funk Squad; DJ Monkey Pilot; The Whip; DJ Monkey Pilot

=== Avalon stage ===
Friday	Saturday	Sunday
Mike Scott and Steve Wickham / The Waterboys; The Cat Empire; Show of Hands; Oi Va Voi; Chumbawamba (acoustic set); Ben Waters Band; Flipron; Tarantism	The Saw Doctors; Seth Lakeman; Gruff Rhys; Julie Fowlis; The Broken Family Band; Robin and Bena Williamson; 3 Daft Monkeys; Big Strides; Sheelanagig	Bellowhead; Kíla; Corb Lund and the Hurtin' Albertans; Rise Kagona and Champion Doug Veitch; Billy Bragg; Tunng; Jeff Lang; Emily Barker and the Red Clay Halo; Avalonian Free State Choir

=== Orange Tent ===
Friday	Saturday	Sunday
Tiny Dancers; Fear of Music; Mumm-Ra (acoustic set); Dragonette; Mr Hudson (acoustic set); Amy Macdonald (acoustic set)	Mr Scruff (DJ set); Clocks; Just Jack; Peter and the Wolf; Josh Pyke (acoustic set)	Mr Scruff (DJ set); The Hours; The Rumble Strips (acoustic set); The Rushes (acoustic set)

== 2008 ==
The festival took place on 27–29 June.

=== Pyramid Stage ===
Friday	Saturday	Sunday
Kings of Leon; The Fratellis; Editors; The Gossip; The Feeling; KT Tunstall; Get Cape. Wear Cape. Fly; The Subways; Kate Nash	Jay-Z; Amy Winehouse; Manu Chao; The Raconteurs; James Blunt; Crowded House; Seasick Steve; Martha Wainwright; Shakin' Stevens	The Verve; Leonard Cohen; Goldfrapp; Neil Diamond; John Mayer; Brian Jonestown Massacre; Gilbert O'Sullivan; Martina Topley Bird

=== Other Stage ===
Friday	Saturday	Sunday
Panic! at the Disco; The Enemy; We Are Scientists; Foals; The Hoosiers; Ben Folds; Vampire Weekend; Joe Lean & The Jing Jang Jong; The Rascals; Ida Maria (Replaced Hilltop Hoods)	Massive Attack; Hot Chip; Elbow; Duffy; The Wombats; Neon Neon; Black Kids; One Night Only; Los Campesinos!; Golden Silvers; The Travelling Band	Groove Armada; The Zutons; The Pigeon Detectives; Mark Ronson; Scouting for Girls; Jack Peñate; Newton Faulkner; Black Mountain; Hoodoo Gurus; Black Cherry

=== Park Stage ===
Friday	Saturday	Sunday
Pete Doherty; Dizzee Rascal; John Cale; (Special Guest Franz Ferdinand); Edwyn Collins; The Duke Spirit; Operator Please; Sons and Daughters; Santigold; Beggars; Magic Wands; Island Line; The Langley Sisters	Cansei de Ser Sexy (CSS); Battles; MGMT; (Special Guest The Last Shadow Puppets with Jack White and Matt Helders); Shlomo; Kool Keith; Guilty Pleasures; Alphabeat; St Vincent; Jape; Eugene McGuinness	My Morning Jacket; Tunng; Saki Cult; Laura Marling; Mystery Jets; Kathryn Williams & Neil MacColl; The Cave Singers; Alberta Cross; Mumford & Sons; lan Tyler & The Lost Sons; Redbridge Brass Band

=== John Peel stage ===
Friday	Saturday	Sunday
The Cribs; Reverend and the Makers; MGMT; The Kills; The Ting Tings; The Young Knives; Lightspeed Champion; Make Model; Glasvegas; Hadouken!; Patrick Watson; Royworld	Biffy Clyro; The Futureheads; Band of Horses; The Black Lips; Vampire Weekend; The Courteeners; British Sea Power; Holy Fuck; The Teenagers; Hilltop Hoods; Emmy the Great; Dogtanion	The National; Spiritualized; Crystal Castles; Blood Red Shoes (replacing The Long Blondes); Stars; Rocket Summer; Friendly Fires; The Whip; Yeasayer

=== Acoustic stage ===
Friday	Saturday	Sunday
Seasick Steve; Sinéad O'Connor; The Blockheads; Arno Carstens; Eddi Reader; Camille O'Sullivan; Eleanor McEvoy; Devon Sproule; Acoustic Stage Blues Club With Grainne Duffy	Gilbert O'Sullivan; The Swell Season Featuring Glen Hansard & Marketa Irglova; Glenn Tilbrook & The Fluffers; Seth Lakeman; Andy Fairweather Low & The Low Riders; Thea Gilmore; Sid Griffin & Coal Porters; Emily Maguire; Acoustic Stage Blues Club With Grainne Duffy; Average Bell Ends; The Travelling Band	Joan Baez; Suzanne Vega; The London Community Gospel Choir; Stackridge; Tom Baxter; Tift Merritt; Foy Vance; Acoustic Stage Blues Club With Grainne Duffy; Amsterdam; Lazenby

=== Jazzworld Stage ===
Friday	Saturday	Sunday
Jimmy Cliff; Estelle; Fun Lovin' Criminals; Lupe Fiasco; Candi Staton; Alabama 3; Soha; Phantom Limb; Mankala	Éthiopiques; Buddy Guy; The Imagined Village; Joan Armatrading; Eric Bibb; Massukos; The Blessing; The Neil Cowley Trio; Bedouin Jerry Can Band	Manu Chao; King Solomon Burke; Eddy Grant; Dub Colossus; Asere & Billy Cobham; Balkan Beat Box; Almasala; Portico Quartet; Sense of Sound

=== Avalon Stage ===
- Sharon Shannon & Big Band
- Xavier Rudd
- Hazel O'Connor
- The Men They Couldn't Hang
- Ron Sexsmith
- Frank Turner
- Kissmet
- Hobo Jones & the Junkyard Dogs
- The Proclaimers
- Will Young
- Bacalao
- The Handsome Family
- The Wurzels
- Rachel Unthank & The Winterset
- Alabama 3 unplugged
- Malarchy
- One String Loose
- Katie Melua
- Blazin' Fiddles
- Justin Adams & Juldeh Camara
- John Tams & Barry Coope
- The Baghdaddies Big Band
- The Family Mahone
- Räfven

=== Poetry&Words Stage ===
- Aisle 16
- Attila the Stockbroker
- Dzifa Benson
- Sophia Blackwell
- The Book Club
- Baba Brinkman
- Alison Brumfitt
- Gary Death
- Melinda May Deathgoth
- Dizraeli
- Kat Francois
- Helen Gregory
- Hammer and Tongue
- A.F. Harrold
- John Hegley
- Adam Horovitz
- Michael Horovitz
- Libby Houston
- Joolz
- Cat Kidd
- Kokumo
- Emma McGordon
- Olúmìdé Pópóọlá

=== Avalon Cafe Stage ===
acts including:
- Nuala & The Alchemy Quartet
- Benji Kirkpatrick
- Rod Thomas
- Lewis Garland & the Kett Rebellion
- The Epstein
- The Gala Band
- The Cedar
- Your Garden Day
- Infected Loop
- Green Angels
- The Johnsons

=== Late n Live Stage ===
acts including:
- Courteeners
- Orphan Boy
- 4:Fifteen
- Rook and The Ravens
- The Travelling Band
- Golden Silvers
- The Seal Cub Clubbing Club
- Gideon Conn
- Danny and Champions of the World
- Karima Francis
- Lazy Bones
- The Filth Wizard
- DJ Jon Ford / Shoplifters

== 2009 ==
The festival took place on 26–28 June.

=== Pyramid Stage ===
Friday	Saturday	Sunday
Neil Young; The Specials; Lily Allen; Fleet Foxes; N*E*R*D; Regina Spektor; Gabriella Cilmi; Björn Again	Bruce Springsteen & the E Street Band; Kasabian; Crosby, Stills and Nash; Dizzee Rascal; Spinal Tap; Eagles of Death Metal; Tinariwen; V V Brown	Blur; Nick Cave and the Bad Seeds; Madness; Tom Jones; Amadou & Mariam; Tony Christie; Status Quo; Easy Star All-Stars

=== Other Stage ===
Friday	Saturday	Sunday
Bloc Party; The Ting Tings; Lady Gaga; Friendly Fires; White Lies; The View; The Maccabees; The Rakes; The Whip; Mr Hudson	Franz Ferdinand; Pendulum; Maxïmo Park; Paolo Nutini; Pete Doherty; The Script; Jason Mraz; Metric; Peter Bjorn and John; The Broken Family Band	The Prodigy; Glasvegas; Bon Iver; Bat for Lashes; Yeah Yeah Yeahs; Enter Shikari; Brand New; Art Brut; The Boxer Rebellion; In Case of Fire

=== Park Stage ===
Friday	Saturday	Sunday
Animal Collective; The Horrors; Noah and the Whale; The Dead Weather; Emilíana Torrini; The Hotrats; James Hunter; Golden Silvers; Bishi; Lay Low	Bon Iver; M. Ward; Klaxons; Shlomo (and Guests); Horace Andy; Easy Star All-Stars; The Memory Band; Bombay Bicycle Club; The Low Anthem; First Aid Kit	Seun Kuti and Fela's Egypt 80; Cold War Kids; Tunng; Tinariwen; Alela Diane; Terry Reid; The Rockingbirds; Alberta Cross; Chief; Micachu and the Shapes; WaterAid Choir

=== John Peel stage ===
Friday	Saturday	Sunday
Doves; Jamie T; Jack Peñate; Little Boots; Metronomy; V V Brown; The Virgins; Fucked Up; The Rumble Strips; Dan Black; General Fiasco	Jarvis Cocker; White Lies; Florence and the Machine; Passion Pit; The Gaslight Anthem; Hockey; The Temper Trap; Esser; The Big Pink; Baddies; The Nightingales	Echo & the Bunnymen; The Wombats; Noisettes; Ladyhawke; The Soft Pack; Just Jack; Emmy the Great; Twisted Wheel; We Have Band; Wave Machines; GoodBooks

=== Acoustic stage ===
Friday	Saturday	Sunday
Ray Davies; Fairport Convention; Jason Mraz; Scott Matthews; No Crows; Hugh Cornwell; Ben Taylor; Sean Taylor; Alyssa Bonagura; John Smith	Kilfenora Céilí Band; Tindersticks; Newton Faulkner; Lisa Hannigan; Gary Louris; Mark Olson; Lúnasa; Bap Kennedy; Hope&Social; Stornoway; Cora Smyth Band	Georgie Fame; Roger McGuinn; Sharon Corr; London Community Gospel Choir; Beth Rowley; Imelda May; Penguin Cafe Orchestra; Kate Walsh; Martin Harley Band; Lucy Wainwright Roche

=== Jazzworld Stage ===
Friday	Saturday	Sunday
Q-Tip; The Streets; Steel Pulse; Lamb; Hot 8 Brass Band; Stephanie McKay	Playing for Change; Baaba Maal; Lonnie Liston Smith; Jamie Cullum; Rokia Traoré; Erik Truffaz; Rolf Harris	The Black Eyed Peas; Manu Dibango; Roots Manuva; Khaled; Orquesta Aragón; Linda Lewis

=== Avalon Stage ===
Friday	Saturday	Sunday
The Blockheads; British Sea Power with Orkestra del Sol; Michael McGoldrick, Iain Fletcher & Andy Dinan; The Puppini Sisters; 3 Daft Monkeys; Baskery; The Mandibles	The Wonder Stuff; Edward II; Eliza Carthy; Badly Drawn Boy; Solas; The King Blues; The Lancashire Hotpots; Wheeler Street; The Martin Harley Band	The Peatbog Faeries; Seth Lakeman; Dodgy; Will Young; Glenn Tilbrook; The Mummers; The Destroyers; Stornoway

== 2010 ==
The festival took place on 25–27 June.

=== Pyramid Stage ===
Friday	Saturday	Sunday
Gorillaz (replaced U2); Dizzee Rascal; Vampire Weekend; Snoop Dogg; Willie Nelson; Corinne Bailey Rae; Femi Kuti; Rolf Harris	Muse; Scissor Sisters; Shakira; The Dead Weather; Seasick Steve; Jackson Browne; The Lightning Seeds; Tinchy Stryder	Stevie Wonder; Faithless; Jack Johnson; Ray Davies; Slash; Norah Jones; Paloma Faith; Yeovil Town Band

=== Other Stage ===
Friday	Saturday	Sunday
The Flaming Lips; Hot Chip; Florence and the Machine; La Roux; Phoenix; The Courteeners; The Stranglers; Joshua Radin; The Magic Numbers	Pet Shop Boys; Editors; The Cribs; The National; Kate Nash; Imogen Heap; Coheed and Cambria; Reef; Two Door Cinema Club	Orbital; LCD Soundsystem; MGMT; We Are Scientists; Grizzly Bear; The Temper Trap; The Hold Steady; Frightened Rabbit; The Joy Formidable

=== John Peel Stage ===
Friday	Saturday	Sunday
Groove Armada; The Black Keys; Mumford & Sons; Ellie Goulding; Kele Okereke; Bombay Bicycle Club; Tegan And Sara; Miike Snow; De Staat; Detroit Social Club	Jamie T; Foals; The xx; Marina And The Diamonds; Delphic; Wild Beasts; Field Music; Cymbals Eat Guitars; Sophie Hunger; Let's Buy Happiness	Ash; Julian Casablancas; Broken Social Scene; Gang Of Four; The Drums; Holy Fuck; Everything Everything; Black Cherry; Dan Mangan

== 2011 ==
The festival took place on 24 to 26 June.

=== Pyramid Stage ===
Friday	Saturday	Sunday
U2; Morrissey; Biffy Clyro; B.B. King; Wu-Tang Clan; Two Door Cinema Club; Metronomy; Master Musicians of Joujouka	Coldplay; Elbow; Paolo Nutini; Tinie Tempah; Rumer; The Gaslight Anthem; Tame Impala; Stornoway	Beyoncé; Pendulum; Plan B; Paul Simon; Laura Marling; Don McLean; The Low Anthem; Fisherman's Friends

=== Other Stage ===
Friday	Saturday	Sunday
Primal Scream; Mumford and Sons; Fleet Foxes; Bright Eyes; The Wombats; The Vaccines; The Naked and Famous; Brother; Chipmunk	The Chemical Brothers; White Lies; Friendly Fires; Jimmy Eat World; The Kills; Jessie J; The Twilight Singers; Treetop Flyers; Alice Gold	Queens of the Stone Age; Kaiser Chiefs; Eels; TV on the Radio; Bombay Bicycle Club; The Noisettes; Cold War Kids; Clare Maguire; Dan Mangan

=== Park Stage ===
Friday	Saturday	Sunday
Crystal Castles; Caribou; Radiohead (special guests); Big Audio Dynamite; Warpaint; Jenny and Johnny; Caitlin Rose; Dylan LeBlanc; Grouplove; Narisarato	Wild Beasts; James Blake; Pulp (special guests); Tame Impala; The Walkmen; Graham Coxon; Those Dancing Days; About Group; Balearic Folk Orchestra; Ellen and the Escapades	Gruff Rhys; Lykke Li; John Grant; The Bees; James Vincent McMorrow; Jonny; Sea of Bees; The Pierces; White Middle Class; Troy Ellis & Hail Jamaica

=== John Peel stage ===
Friday	Saturday	Sunday
DJ Shadow; Example; The Coral; I Am Kloot; Darwin Deez; Cage the Elephant; Miles Kane; Mona; Stonefield; Cocoon	Glasvegas; Battles; Noah and the Whale; The Horrors; Warpaint; Anna Calvi; Dry the River; Yuck; Brave Yesterday	The Streets; Robyn; Hurts; The Vaccines; Everything Everything; OK Go; The Joy Formidable; Foster the People; The Raghu Dixit Project; My Tiger My Timing

=== West Holts Stage ===
Friday	Saturday	Sunday
Cee Lo Green; Chase & Status; Heliocentrics with Mulatu; Jimmy Cliff; Little Dragon; Gonjasufi; Dengue Fever; Ziriguidum	Big Boi; Janelle Monáe; Aloe Blacc; Fool's Gold; Omar Souleyman; Brandt Brauer Frick; Nicolas Jaar; Narasirato; London Afrobeat Collective	Kool & the Gang; Hercules and Love Affair; The Go! Team; Duane Eddy; Bellowhead; Jah Wobble and the Nippon dub Ensemble; Jamie Woon; Hidden Orchestra

=== BBC Introducing stage ===
Acts
- Ed Sheeran
- F-Block
- The Good Natured
- Jake Bugg
- Sharks Took the Rest
- Vessels
- George Ezra

=== Spirit of '71 stage (Anniversary Pyramid Stage) ===
Curated by Andrew Kerr.

Acts
- The Edgar Broughton Band
- Mike Oldfield
- Steve Hillage
- Arthur Brown
- Nick Lowe
- Noel Harrison
- Nik Turner
- Mick Farren

== 2012 ==
There was no Glastonbury Festival in 2012, with the organizers having planned it as a "fallow year", due to the 2012 Summer Olympics and Paralympics in London.

== 2013 ==
The festival took place on 24–28 June.

=== Pyramid Stage ===
Friday	Saturday	Sunday
Arctic Monkeys; Dizzee Rascal; The Vaccines; Professor Green; Rita Ora; Jake Bugg; HAIM; Jupiter & Okwess International	Rolling Stones; Primal Scream; Elvis Costello And The Imposters; Ben Howard; Laura Mvula; Billy Bragg; Rokia Traoré	Mumford & Sons; Nick Cave and the Bad Seeds; Vampire Weekend; Kenny Rogers; Rufus Wainwright; First Aid Kit; Bassekou Kouyate

(Jupiter & Okwess International replaced Toumani Diabaté who cancelled due to malaria)

=== Other Stage ===
Friday	Saturday	Sunday
Portishead; Foals; Alt-J; Tame Impala; The Lumineers; Enter Shikari; Amanda Palmer; The Hives; Beady Eye	Chase & Status; Example; Two Door Cinema Club; Alabama Shakes; Noah and the Whale; Azealia Banks; Dry the River; The 1975; The Staves	The xx; Smashing Pumpkins; Editors; Of Monsters and Men; Public Image Ltd; I Am Kloot; Stornoway; The Heavy; Zulu Winter

=== John Peel Stage ===
Friday	Saturday	Sunday
Crystal Castles; Courteeners; Bastille; Frightened Rabbit; Miles Kane; Local Natives; Peace; Kodaline; Dog Is Dead; San Cisco; Francois and the Atlas Mountains	Hurts; Everything Everything; Savages; Johnny Marr; Daughter; The Strypes; Toy; MS MR; Jagwar Ma; Prāta vētra; RPM	Phoenix; Tyler, The Creator & Earl Sweatshirt; James Blake; Jessie Ware; Tom Odell; Villagers; Deap Vally; Suuns; The Bots; Get Two Fock; The Dancers

== 2014 ==
The festival took place from the 27 to 29 June.

=== Pyramid Stage ===
Friday	Saturday	Sunday
Arcade Fire; Elbow; Lily Allen; Rudimental; De La Soul; Rodrigo y Gabriela; The War on Drugs; Turtle Island	Metallica; Jack White; Robert Plant; Lana Del Rey; Kelis; Angel Haze; Nitin Sawhney; Nick Mulvey	Kasabian; The Black Keys; Ed Sheeran; Dolly Parton; The 1975; Toumani Diabaté & Sidiki Diabate; Caro Emerald; English National Ballet

=== Other Stage ===
Friday	Saturday	Sunday
Skrillex; Paolo Nutini; Interpol; Foster the People; HAIM; Band of Skulls; John Newman; Blondie; Kaiser Chiefs	Jake Bugg; Pixies; Manic Street Preachers; Imagine Dragons; Kodaline; Warpaint; Midlake; Circa Waves; Jake Isaac	Massive Attack; Ellie Goulding; Bombay Bicycle Club; The Horrors; Sam Smith; White Lies; Lucy Rose; The Subways; Bajofondo

=== John Peel Stage ===
Friday	Saturday	Sunday
Kaiser Chiefs; Lykke Li; Chvrches; Wild Beasts; Crystal Fighters; No Blacks Here; The Four Just Whites; Polica; Temples; Drenge; Jungle; Money For Old Rope; Echo And The Empress	MGMT; Twin Atlantic; Little Dragon; Clean Bandit; Courtney Barnett; Wolf Alice; Fat White Family; Royal Blood; Middle Class Boys; Hozier; Reignwolf; The Black Tambourines	London Grammar; Chance The Rapper; The Brian Jonestown Massacre; Bleachers; King Charles; Dry the River; The Kooks (Secret Set); George Ezra; Lonely The Brave; The Preatures; Darlia

== 2015 ==
The 2015 Glastonbury Festival of Contemporary Performing Arts took place between 24 and 28 June.

The following acts were announced to perform.

=== Pyramid Stage ===
Friday	Saturday	Sunday
Florence and the Machine (replaced Foo Fighters); The Libertines (special guests); Motörhead; Mary J. Blige; Alabama Shakes; James Bay; Chronixx; Michael Clark Company	Kanye West; Pharrell Williams; Paloma Faith; Burt Bacharach; George Ezra; The Waterboys; Courtney Barnett; The Unthanks with Orchestra, conducted by Charles Hazlewood	The Who; Paul Weller; Alt-J; Lionel Richie; Patti Smith; Hozier; Songhoy Blues; Burtle Silver Band

=== Other Stage ===
Friday	Saturday	Sunday
Rudimental; Mark Ronson; The Courteeners; The Vaccines; Jungle; Catfish and the Bottlemen; Everything Everything; The Cribs; The Charlatans	Deadmau5; Ben Howard; The Maccabees; Clean Bandit; Ella Eyre; Young Fathers; The Strypes (replaced Azealia Banks); Frank Turner; Swim Deep	The Chemical Brothers; Jamie T; Belle & Sebastian; Future Islands; Twin Atlantic; Palma Violets; Adam Cohen; SOAK; Rival Sons

=== John Peel Stage ===
Friday	Saturday	Sunday
Enter Shikari; Modestep; SBTRKT; Peace; Chet Faker; The Districts; Leon Bridges; Rainy Boy Sleep; Hinds; Weaves	Suede; La Roux; Death from Above 1979; Jessie Ware; Years & Years; The Pop Group; Sleaford Mods; Slaves; Coasts; Sunset Sons; Isaac Lee-Kronick	FFS (Franz Ferdinand & Sparks); Death Cab for Cutie; Lianne La Havas; Charli XCX; Django Django; Alvvays; Prides; Saint Raymond; Mini Mansions; Gengahr; Lucy Kitchen

=== West Holts ===
Friday	Saturday	Sunday
Hot Chip; Caribou; Run The Jewels; The Gaslamp Killer Experience; Kasai Allstars; Marcos Valle; Dorian Concept; The Cambodian Space Project	The Mothership Returns: George Clinton, Parliament, Funkadelic, & The Family Stone; Todd Terje & The Olsens; Vintage Trouble; Gregory Porter; Soil & Pimp Sessions; Sinkane; Jane Weaver; K.O.G. & The Zongo Brigade	Flying Lotus; FKA Twigs; Roy Ayers; Steel Pulse; Cumbia All Stars; Hiatus Kaiyote; Ibibio Sound Machine; Flamingods

=== The Park Stage ===
Friday	Saturday	Sunday
Super Furry Animals; Jamie xx; Sharon Van Etten; Benjamin Booker; Wolf Alice; Glass Animals; Shlomo; King Gizzard & the Lizard Wizard; Pussy Riot In Conversation; Rhodes	Jon Hopkins; Spiritualized; Mavis Staples; Father John Misty; Kae Tempest; Gaz Coombes; Giant Sand; Ibeyi; Eaves; Flo Morrissy	Ryan Adams; Goat; The Fall; Perfume Genius; Fat White Family; The Staves; Rae Morris; Jack Garratt; Denai Moore; Rag 'N' Bone Man

== 2016 ==
The 2016 Glastonbury Festival of Contemporary Performing Arts took place between 22 and 26 June 2016.

The line-up was as follows:

=== Pyramid Stage ===
Friday	Saturday	Sunday
Muse; Foals; ZZ Top; Jess Glynne; Two Door Cinema Club; Skepta; Rokia Traoré; The Orchestra of Syrian Musicians with Damon Albarn & Guests	Adele; Tame Impala; The Last Shadow Puppets; Madness; Wolf Alice; Baaba Maal; Squeeze; Lewisham and Greenwich NHS Choir	Coldplay; Beck; Ellie Goulding; Jeff Lynne's ELO; Laura Mvula; Gregory Porter; Caravan Palace; Burnham and Highbridge Band

=== Other Stage ===
Friday	Saturday	Sunday
Disclosure; Bastille; Bring Me the Horizon; Editors; The Lumineers; Frightened Rabbit; Christine and the Queens; Blossoms; James	New Order; Chvrches; The 1975; Tom Odell; Band of Skulls; Hurts; St. Paul and The Broken Bones; Shura; HÆLOS	LCD Soundsystem; PJ Harvey; Catfish and the Bottlemen; Years & Years; Jamie Lawson; Paul Heaton + Jacqui Abbott; Bear's Den; Newton Faulkner; Anteros

=== West Holts Stage ===
Friday	Saturday	Sunday
Underworld; Róisín Murphy; White Denim; Protoje; Vince Staples; DakhaBrakha; Bixiga 70; The Paradise Bangkok Molam International Band	James Blake; Santigold; The Very Best with Special Guests; Shibusashirazu Orchestra; Mbongwana Star; Little Simz; Odisee & Good Company; Anna Meredith	Earth, Wind & Fire; Gary Clark Jr; Quantic All Stars; Anoushka Shankar; Michael Kiwanuka; Kamasi Washington; Eska; Human Pyramids

=== John Peel Stage ===
Friday	Saturday	Sunday
Sigur Rós; AlunaGeorge; Explosions in the Sky; Jack Garratt; Half Moon Run; Aurora; Rat Boy; Elle King; X Ambassadors; Dan Stuart with Twin Tones	M83; Fatboy Slim; Example; John Grant; MØ; Låpsley; Alessia Cara; Dua Lipa; Nothing but Thieves; Palace	Jake Bugg; Mac DeMarco; Of Monsters and Men; Band of Horses; Bat for Lashes; Mystery Jets; Matt Corby; Tired Lion; She Drew the Gun

=== The Park Stage ===
Friday	Saturday	Sunday
Richard Hawley; Savages; Ronnie Spector; Daughter; Ezra Furman; Unknown Mortal Orchestra; Nao; Night Beats; Declan McKenna; Gwenno Saunders	Philip Glass' Heroes Symphony; Mercury Rev; Floating Points; Ernest Ranglin & Friends; Kurt Vile; Jagwar Ma; Lady Leshurr; Izzy Bizu; Cat's Eyes; Car Seat Headrest	Grimes; Guy Garvey; Saint Etienne; Kwabs; Nathaniel Rateliff & The Night Sweats; Hinds; C Duncan; Holly Macve; Khruangbin

== 2017 ==
The 2017 Glastonbury Festival of Contemporary Performing Arts took place between 21 and 25 June 2017.

The line-up was as follows:

=== Pyramid Stage ===
Friday	Saturday	Sunday
Radiohead; The xx; Royal Blood; Kris Kristofferson; First Aid Kit; Blossoms; Paul Carrack; Hacienda Classical – Graeme Park, Mike Pickering & Manchester Camerata Orchestra + special guests	Foo Fighters; The National; Katy Perry; Run The Jewels; Craig David; Jools Holland & His Rhythm & Blues Orchestra; Vieux Farka Touré; The Bootleg Beatles with The Pepperland Sinfonia	Ed Sheeran; Biffy Clyro; Chic; Barry Gibb; Laura Marling; Jamie Cullum; Orchestra Baobab; Black Dyke Band

=== Other Stage ===
Friday	Saturday	Sunday
Major Lazer; Lorde; George Ezra; Halsey; Glass Animals; Circa Waves; Nothing But Thieves; Charli XCX; The Pretenders	Alt-J; Stormzy; Wiley; Liam Gallagher; Kaiser Chiefs; Wild Beasts; British Sea Power; Whitney; Gabrielle Aplin	Boy Better Know; Emeli Sandé; The Courteeners; HAIM; Kodaline; Rag'n'Bone Man; Dropkick Murphys; Deaf Havana; Slaves

=== West Holts Stage ===
Friday	Saturday	Sunday
Dizzee Rascal; Anderson Paak & The Free Nationals; Little Dragon; Kae Tempest; Pat Thomas & The Kwashibu Area Band; Ata Kak; Henry Wu presents The Kamaal Williams Ensemble; Hot 8 Brass Band	The Jacksons; Solange; The Avalanches; Toots & The Maytals; Badbadnotgood; Thundercat; Afriquoi; Khruangbin	Justice; Moderat; The Cinematic Orchestra; Shaggy; Oumou Sangaré; Yorkston/Thorne/Khan; Ryley Walker; House Gospel Choir

=== John Peel Stage ===
Friday	Saturday	Sunday
Annie Mac; Clean Bandit; Future Islands; Ride; Declan McKenna; The Lemon Twigs; Dua Lipa; Black Honey; Rews; Dam	Phoenix; Father John Misty; DJ Shadow; Tove Lo; Loyle Carner; Cabbage; The Amazons; Inheaven; Maggie Rogers; Josh Barry	Metronomy; London Grammar; Goldfrapp; The Killers (secret show, listed in programme as TBA); Frank Carter and the Rattlesnakes; King Gizzard and the Lizard Wizard; Real Estate; Sundara Karma; October Drift

=== The Park Stage ===
Friday	Saturday	Sunday
The Flaming Lips; Sleaford Mods; Elbow (secret band originally billed as 'TBA'); Angel Olsen; Mark Lanegan; Hamilton Leithauser; Margo Price; Bo Ningen; Georgia	Warpaint; Joe Goddard; Songhoy Blues; Temples; Nadia Rose; Sigrid; The Moonlandingz; Amber Arcades; Kelsey Lu	Kano; Sampha; Nick Mulvey; Lisa Hannigan; Julia Jacklin; All We Are; Dr. Dog; She Drew the Gun; Avalonian Choir

== 2019 ==
The 2019 Glastonbury Festival of Contemporary Performing Arts took place between 26 and 30 June 2019.

The line-up was as follows:

=== Pyramid Stage ===
Friday	Saturday	Sunday
Stormzy^{[A]}; George Ezra; Lauryn Hill; Bastille^{[B]}; Sheryl Crow; Tom Odell; Björn Again	The Killers^{[C]}; Liam Gallagher; Janet Jackson; Hozier; Anne-Marie; Carrie Underwood; The Proclaimers	The Cure; Vampire Weekend; Miley Cyrus^{[E]}; Kylie Minogue^{[D]}; Years & Years; Mavis Staples

A Stormzy's set featured appearances by Chris Martin, Dave and Fredo.

B. Bastille's set featured an appearance by Lewis Capaldi.

C. The Killers' set featured appearances by Pet Shop Boys and Johnny Marr.

D. Kylie Minogue's set featured appearances by Nick Cave and Chris Martin.

E. Miley Cyrus' set featured appearances by Mark Ronson, Billy Ray Cyrus and Lil Nas X.

=== Other Stage ===
Friday	Saturday	Sunday
Tame Impala; Two Door Cinema Club; The Charlatans; The Lumineers; Mac Demarco; The Wombats; MØ; The Vaccines	The Chemical Brothers; Courteeners; Sigrid; Johnny Marr; Lewis Capaldi; Maggie Rogers; Fantastic Negrito; The Cat Empire	Christine and the Queens; Dave; Billie Eilish; Loyle Carner; Bring Me the Horizon; Babymetal; Slaves; Circa Waves; SK Shlomo

=== West Holts Stage ===
Friday	Saturday	Sunday
Jon Hopkins; Jorja Smith; Maribou State; The Comet Is Coming; BCUC; Swindle; Acid Mothers Temple; The Mauskovic Dance Band	Wu-Tang Clan; Jungle; Neneh Cherry; Lizzo; Slowthai; Ezra Collective; Grupo Magnetico; The Turbans (music group)	Janelle Monáe; Kamasi Washington; Roy Ayers; Fatoumata Diawara; This Is the Kit; Jeff Goldblum; Hollie Cook; KOKOROKO

=== John Peel Stage ===
Friday	Saturday	Sunday
Interpol; Pale Waves; Aurora; Rosalía; Pond; Goat Girl; Mahalia; Pip Blom	Sean Paul; Bugzy Malone; Sharon Van Etten; Low; Freya Ridings; Shura; Gerry Cinnamon; She Drew the Gun; Swimming Girls	The Streets; Friendly Fires; Stefflon Don; Tom Walker; Dermot Kennedy; Octavian; Alma; Eyre Llew

=== The Park Stage ===
Friday	Saturday	Sunday
Cat Power; Michael Kiwanuka; Idles; SOAK; King Princess; Lukas Nelson & Promise of the Real; Georgia; Steam Down; Lankum	Hot Chip; Kae Tempest; Kurt Vile and the Violators; Foals (Originally billed as TBA); Sons of Kemet; Love Unlimited Orchestra; Mattiel; Ama Lou; Vampire Weekend (Originally billed as TBA)	Rex Orange County; Little Simz; The Good, the Bad & the Queen; Fat White Family; Palace; Koffee; Jessie Buckley; Black Peaches

== 2020 ==
The 2020 Glastonbury Festival was to take place between 24 and 28 June 2020. The first wave of performers for the festival were announced on lineup was announced on 12 March. However, the festival was cancelled on 18 March 2020 due to the COVID-19 pandemic.

The following artists had been announced as part of the 2020 Glastonbury lineup prior the event's cancellation:

- Kendrick Lamar
- Paul McCartney
- Taylor Swift
- Diana Ross
- Aitch
- AJ Tracey
- Anderson Paak and The Free Nationals
- Angel Olsen
- Anna Calvi
- The Avalanches
- Banks
- Baxter Dury
- beabadoobee
- The Big Moon
- Big Thief
- Big Time Rush
- Black Uhuru
- Blossoms
- Brittany Howard
- Burna Boy
- Cage the Elephant
- Camila Cabello
- Candi Staton
- Caribou
- Cate Le Bon
- Celeste
- Charli XCX
- Clairo
- Confidence Man
- Crowded House
- Danny Brown
- Declan McKenna
- Dizzee Rascal
- Dua Lipa
- EarthGang
- EOB
- Editors
- Elbow
- Fatboy Slim
- FKA Twigs
- Fontaines D.C.
- Gilberto Gil
- Glass Animals
- Goldfrapp
- Greentea Peng
- Groove Armada
- HAIM
- Happy Mondays
- Herbie Hancock
- Imelda May
- The Isley Brothers
- Jarvis Cocker
- Jehnny Beth
- The Jesus and Mary Chain
- Kacey Musgraves
- Kano
- Kelis
- Khruangbin
- KOKOKO!
- La Roux
- Lana Del Rey
- Laura Marling
- Lianne La Havas
- The Lightning Seeds
- London Grammar
- Mabel
- Manic Street Preachers
- Metronomy
- Nadine Shah
- Noel Gallagher's High Flying Birds
- Nubya Garcia
- The Orielles
- Pet Shop Boys
- Phoebe Bridgers
- Primal Scream
- Richard Dawson
- Rufus Wainwright
- Sam Fender
- Sampa the Great
- Seun Kuti
- Sinéad O'Connor
- Skunk Anansie
- Snarky Puppy
- Soccer Mommy
- The Specials
- Squid
- The Staves
- Supergrass
- Suzanne Vega
- Thom Yorke
- Thundercat
- Tinariwen
- TLC
- Tom Misch and Yussef Dayes
- Tones and I
- The Waterboys

== 2021 ==
The 2021 Glastonbury Festival was scheduled for June 23 through June 27 but was cancelled in late January due to the COVID-19 pandemic for the second year in a row. In its place, a shortened, live-streamed concert, Live at Worthy Farm, was held on May 22 followed by an encore on May 23. The live-stream was held on the grounds where Glastonbury typically takes place.

The broadcast included:

- Coldplay
- Damon Albarn
- George Ezra
- HAIM
- Idles
- Jorja Smith
- Kano
- Michael Kiwanuka
- Wolf Alice
- The Smile
- DJ Honey Dijon
- PJ Harvey
- Jarvis Cocker
- Kae Tempest
- George the Poet
- Kurupt FM
- Little Amal
- Michael Eavis
- Róisín Murphy

They also held the Glastonbury Experience between June 25 and June 27 and played highlights of past festivals; it was accessible via BBC iPlayer and on BBC Two and BBC Four. Performances shown included:

- Glastonbury in the 90s, narrated by Skin from Skunk Anansie
- Radiohead (1997)
- R.E.M. (1999)
- Glastonbury in the 21st Century – performances since 2000
- Kylie Minogue (2019)
- Arctic Monkeys (2013)
- Glastonbury Legends – including Paul McCartney, Paul Simon, Kylie Minogue, and Madness
- Live at Worthy Farm: Backstage – narrated by Jo Whiley
- Live at Worthy Farm – highlights from the 2021 live-stream including Coldplay, HAIM, and Damon Albarn
- Al Green (1999)
- Best of Glastonbury 1998 – including Primal Scream, James, Foo Fighters, The Lightning Seeds, Blur, Robbie Williams
- Best of Glastonbury 1999 – including R.E.M., The Beautiful South, Blondie, and Barenaked Ladies
- Best of Glastonbury 2003 – including Manic Street Preachers, R.E.M., Radiohead, Macy Gray, and the Sugababes
- Iggy Pop and The Stooges (2007)
- Glastonbury 2017 – including Radiohead, Foo Fighters, and Ed Sheeran; hosted by Jo Whiley and Mark Radcliffe
- Fela Kuti (1984)

BBC Radio 1, BBC Radio 2, BBC Radio 1Xtra, and others played show highlights; hosts included Future Sounds, Festival Anthems, Jordan North, DJ Target, Tiffany Calver, Bobby Friction, Sounds of the 90s, Jo Whiley, Lauren Laverne, The Blessed Madonna, Cerys Matthews, Zoe Ball, and Dermot O'Leary.

== 2022 ==
In August 2021, Michael Eavis shared that the same bands from the 2020 lineup should be present at the 2022 festival.

The 2022 Glastonbury Festival of Contemporary Performing Arts took place between 22 and 26 June 2022.

The line-up was as follows:

=== Pyramid Stage ===
Friday	Saturday	Sunday
Billie Eilish; Sam Fender; Robert Plant & Alison Krauss; Wolf Alice; Crowded House; Rufus Wainwright; Ziggy Marley	Paul McCartney; Noel Gallagher's High Flying Birds; Haim; Greta Thunberg; AJ Tracey; Easy Life; Joy Crookes; Les Amazones D'Afrique	Kendrick Lamar; Lorde; Elbow; Diana Ross; Herbie Hancock; Dakhabrakha; Black Dyke Band

=== Other Stage ===
Friday	Saturday	Sunday
Foals; St. Vincent; Idles; Supergrass; First Aid Kit; Blossoms; Kae Tempest; The Libertines	Megan Thee Stallion; Burna Boy; Olivia Rodrigo; Glass Animals; Metronomy; Skunk Ananise; Tems; Hak Baker	Pet Shop Boys; Years & Years; Kacey Musgraves; Fontaines DC; Declan McKenna; Lianne La Havas; Sea Girls; Kojey Radical

=== West Holts Stage ===
Friday	Saturday	Sunday
Little Simz; Bonobo; Seun Kuti & Egypt 80; TLC; Sleaford Mods; Greentea Peng; Arooj Aftab; Nubiyan Twist	Roisin Murphy; Caribou; Leon Bridges; Celeste; Yves Tumor; Black Midi; Brass Against; Kikagaku Moyo	Bicep; Angelique Kidjo; Koffee; Snarky Puppy; Nubya Garcia; Nightmares On Wax; Emma-Jean Thackray; Ishmael Ensemble

=== John Peel Stage ===
Friday	Saturday	Sunday
Primal Scream; The Jesus and Mary Chain; Phoebe Bridgers; Sigrid; Girl In Red; Inhaler; Griff; Bad Boy Chiller Crew; English Teacher	Jamie T; Yungblud; Ghetts; Pa Salieu; Beabadoobee; Self Esteem; Holly Humberstone; Enny; Go_A	Charli XCX; Little Dragon; Turnstile; Amyl and the Sniffers; Clairo; George Ezra (billed as TBA); Sports Team; Just Mustard

=== The Park Stage ===
Friday	Saturday	Sunday
Four Tet; Khruangbin; Saint Etienne; Arlo Parks; Dry Cleaning; Confidence Man; Wet Leg; Orlando Weeks; Matilda Mann	Jessie Ware; Mitski; The Avalanches; Big Thief; Squid; Sampa The Great; Gabriels; Katy J Pearson; Yasmin Williams	Courtney Barnett; Jarv Is...; Jack White (billed as TBA); Caroline Polachek; Cate Le Bon; Warmduscher; Big Joanie; Deep Throat Choir

== 2023 ==
The 2023 Glastonbury Festival of Contemporary Performing Arts took place between 21 and 25 June 2023.

The lineup was as follows:

=== Pyramid Stage ===
Friday	Saturday	Sunday
Arctic Monkeys; Royal Blood; Foo Fighters (billed as "The Churnups"); Texas; Stefflon Don; Maisie Peters; The Master Musicians of Joujouka	Guns N' Roses; Lizzo; Lewis Capaldi; Aitch; Amadou & Mariam; Raye; Rick Astley	Elton John; Lil Nas X; Blondie; Yusuf / Cat Stevens; The Chicks; Sophie Ellis-Bextor; Bristol Reggae Orchestra and Windrush Choir

=== Other Stage ===
Friday	Saturday	Sunday
Wizkid; Fred Again..; Chvrches; Krept and Konan; Carly Rae Jepsen; The Lightning Seeds; The Hives; Ben Howard	Lana Del Rey; Central Cee; Manic Street Preachers; Maggie Rogers; Generation Sex; Tom Grennan; The Lathums; The Unthanks	Queens of the Stone Age; The War on Drugs; Becky Hill; Dermot Kennedy; The Teskey Brothers; Nova Twins; Japanese Breakfast; The Joy

=== West Holts Stage ===
Friday	Saturday	Sunday
Kelis; Young Fathers; Joey Bada$$; Gabriels; Louis Cole; ADG7; Yaya Bey; Star Feminine Band	Loyle Carner; Mahalia; Ezra Collective; Jacob Collier; Third World; Sudan Archives; Kanda Bongo Man; Say She She	Rudimental; Candi Staton; Barrington Levy; The Hu; Speakers Corner Quartet; Black Country, New Road; Beth Orton; Skinny Pelembe

=== Woodsies Stage ===
Friday	Saturday	Sunday
Hot Chip; Warpaint; Hozier (billed as TBA); Courteeners; Pale Waves; Digga D; Flo; Bru-C; The Sixsters	Christine & The Queens; Rina Sawayama; Maneskin; Rick Astley & Blossoms perform The Smiths (billed as TBA); Shame; The Murder Capital; Working Men's Club; Wunderhorse; The Last Dinner Party	Phoenix; Caroline Polachek; Editors; Slowdive; Cat Burns; The Big Moon; CMAT; The Love Buzz

=== The Park Stage ===
Friday	Saturday	Sunday
Fever Ray; Sparks; Shygirl; The Comet Is Coming; Unknown Mortal Orchestra; Billy Nomates; Los Bitchos; Alabaster DePlume; Adwaith	Fatboy Slim; Leftfield; The Pretenders; Tinariwen; Obongjayar; Jockstrap; Flohio; James Ellis Ford; Max Richter	alt-J; Thundercat; Alison Goldfrapp; Viagra Boys; Weyes Blood; Charlotte Adigery & Bolis Pupul; Gwenno; John Francis Flynn

== 2024 ==
The 2024 Glastonbury Festival of Contemporary Performing Arts took place between 26 and 30 June 2024.

The lineup was as follows:

=== Pyramid Stage ===
Friday	Saturday	Sunday
Dua Lipa; LCD Soundsystem; PJ Harvey; Paul Heaton; Seventeen; Olivia Dean; Squeeze	Coldplay; Little Simz; Michael Kiwanuka; Keane; Cyndi Lauper; Ayra Starr; Femi Kuti	SZA; Burna Boy; Janelle Monáe; Shania Twain; Paloma Faith; Seasick Steve; Interlinked by Birmingham Royal Ballet

=== Other Stage ===
Friday	Saturday	Sunday
Idles; D-Block Europe; Anne Marie; Bombay Bicycle Club; Confidence Man; Headie One; The Snuts; Annie Mac	Disclosure; The Streets; Camilla Cabello; Bloc Party; The Last Dinner Party; Tems; The Staves; Jamie Webster	The National; Two Door Cinema Club; Avril Lavigne; Nothing But Thieves; James; Soft Play; Rachel Chinouriri; The Zutons

=== West Holts Stage ===
Friday	Saturday	Sunday
Jungle; Heilung; Danny Brown; Sugababes; Noname; Squid; Asha Puthli; Sofia Kourtesis	Jessie Ware; Masego; Black Pumas; Nitin Sawhney; Corrine Bailey Rae; Alogte Oho & His Sounds of Joy; The Skatalites; 47SOUL	Justice; Nia Archives; Brittany Howard; Jordan Rakei; Steel Pulse; Balming Tiger; Jalen Ngonda; Matthew Halsall

=== Woodsies Stage ===
Friday	Saturday	Sunday
Jamie XX; Sampha; Declan McKenna; Arlo Parks; The Vaccines; Kenya Grace; Remi Wolf; Lambrini Girls; Voice of Braceprot	Gossip; Sleaford Mods; Yard Act; Kasabian (billed as TBA); Fat White Family; Soccer Mommy; Mannequin Pussy; High Vis; Kneecap	James Blake; Romy; Kim Gordon; Alvvays; Blondshell; NewDad; The K's; Jayhadadream (ETC Competition Winner)

=== The Park Stage ===
Friday	Saturday	Sunday
Fontaines D.C.; King Krule; Aurora; Dexys; This Is The Kit; The Mary Wallopers; Barry Can't Swim; Moonchild Sanelly; Lynks	Peggy Gou; Orbital; The Breeders; Lankum; Arooj Aftab; Otoboke Beaver; Bar Italia; Kara Jackson; Johnny Flynn	London Grammar; Ghetts; Mount Kimbie; Baxter Dury; Mdou Moctar; Psychedelic Porn Crumpets; Lime Garden; Problem Patterns

== 2025 ==
The 2025 Glastonbury Festival of Contemporary Performing Arts took place between 25 and 29 June 2025.

The lineup was as follows:

=== Pyramid Stage ===
Friday	Saturday	Sunday
The 1975; Biffy Clyro; Alanis Morissette; Lewis Capaldi (billed as TBA); Burning Spear; CMAT; Supergrass	Neil Young and the Chrome Hearts; Raye; Pulp (billed as "Patchwork"); John Fogerty; The Script; Brandi Carlile; Kaiser Chiefs	Olivia Rodrigo; Noah Kahan; Nile Rodgers & Chic; Rod Stewart; The Libertines; Celeste; The Selecter

=== Other Stage ===
Friday	Saturday	Sunday
Loyle Carner; Busta Rhymes; Gracie Abrams; Franz Ferdinand; Wet Leg; Inhaler; Rizzle Kicks; Fabio & Grooverider and the Outlook Orchestra	Charli XCX; Skepta (replacing Deftones who cancelled last minute due to illness); Ezra Collective; Amyl & The Sniffers; Weezer; Beabadoobee; Good Neighbours; Alessi Rose	The Prodigy; Wolf Alice; Snow Patrol; Turnstile; Joy Crookes; Shaboozey; Nadine Shah; Louis Dunford

=== West Holts Stage ===
Friday	Saturday	Sunday
Maribou State; Badbadnotgood; Denzel Curry; En Vogue; Vieux Farka Toure; Glass Beams; Ca7riel & Paco Amoroso; corto.alto	Doechii; Amaarae; Greentea Peng; Yussef Dayes; Kneecap; Bob Vylan; Nilüfer Yanya; Infinity Song	Overmono; Parcels; The Brian Jonestown Massacre; GOAT; Black Uhuru; Cymande; Abel Selaocoe and the Bantu Ensemble; Thandii

=== Woodsies Stage ===
Friday	Saturday	Sunday
Four Tet; Floating Points; PinkPantheress; Blossoms; Lola Young; Shed Seven; Fat Dog; Myles Smith; Lorde (billed as TBA)	Scissor Sisters; Tom Odell; Father John Misty; TV On The Radio; Nova Twins; JADE; Fcukers; Sorry; The Amazons	Jorja Smith; AJ Tracey; St. Vincent; Black Country, New Road; Djo; Sprints; Gurriers; Westside Cowboy (ETC Competition Winner)

=== The Park Stage ===
Friday	Saturday	Sunday
Anohni and the Johnsons; Self Esteem; Wunderhorse; Osees; English Teacher; Faye Webster; Jalen Ngonda; John Glacier; Horsegirl	Caribou; Beth Gibbons; Haim (billed as TBA); Gary Numan; Pa Salieu; Lucy Dacus; Japanese Breakfast; Ichiko Aoba; Yann Tiersen	The Maccabees; Future Islands; Kae Tempest; Girl In Red; Royel Otis; Katy J Pearson; Geordie Greep; Melin Melyn
