= Glastonbury Festival 2008 =

Music festival in England

- Date: 27 June 2008 – 29 June 2008
- Locations: Worthy Farm, Pilton, Somerset, England
- Previous event: Glastonbury Festival 2007
- Next event: Glastonbury Festival 2009
- Participants: Amy Winehouse; Jay-Z

The 2008 Glastonbury Festival of Contemporary Performing Arts was held from 27 to 29 June 2008.

== New features ==
- The John Peel stage doubled in size and had a screen outside it to watch bands.
- There was a new 'Shangri-La' area that replaced Lost Vagueness. The area contained 12 stages.
- Festival-goers were provided with ten free biodegradable tent pegs, to prevent injury to cows.
- The festival site expanded by roughly 40–50 acres.

== Ticket sales ==
The ticket registration system that was established in 2007 continued in 2008 having won numerous awards, including Best Innovation at the 2007 UK Festival Awards. Registration was available throughout February, online and from Millets camping stores. It closed on 14 March, however due to tickets not selling out, registration for the festival was re-opened at 4 pm on Tuesday 8 April allowing those who hadn't previously registered to purchase tickets.

In July 2007 site owner and organiser Michael Eavis stated that 40 per cent of tickets for the upcoming festival would be sold by telephone in order to attract more teenagers to the event. Eavis was quoted as saying that most sales being on-line during 2007 resulted in most festival-goers being "too middle aged and respectable". The logic of this reasoning seems questionable, however, as internet use is traditionally associated with youths, certainly more so than ownership of a phone line.

Sale of tickets did not occur as fast as has been the case in recent years. After tickets went public on 6 April, only around 100,000 were purchased, prompting Eavis to re-open registration two days later. By contrast, 2007 saw the then entire allocation of 137,500 tickets sell out in around two hours. There are a number of theories as to why the 2008 lapse in ticket sales has occurred, with one popular theory being that would-be patrons have been put off due to the inclusion of hip hop artist Jay-Z. Michael Eavis disputes this, claiming that the lapse is due to a long run of poor weather conditions during previous years of the festival. The global economic downturn may be another explanation for would-be festival goers deciding instead to hold on to their money. The event did eventually sell out, although the final tickets were sold on the opening Friday.

== Jay-Z headlining ==
It was announced on 1 February 2008 that Jay-Z would headline Glastonbury Festival in 2008, becoming the first major hip-hop artist to headline the British festival. His selection was blamed by some for relatively slow ticket sales for the festival, although a more likely cause is the preceding run of terrible weather and flooding that in 2007 made life at the festival very difficult An outspoken critic of his selection was Noel Gallagher of Oasis fame. In response to Gallagher's criticism, Jay-Z opened his Glastonbury set with a tongue-in-cheek cover of Oasis's iconic song "Wonderwall". and later included the lines That bloke from Oasis said I couldn't play guitar/Somebody should have told him I'm a fuckin' rock star in his song "Jockin' Jay-Z".

== Artists ==
These are the performers which have been confirmed by the official Glastonbury Festival website:

=== Pyramid stage ===
Friday	Saturday	Sunday
Kings of Leon; The Fratellis; Editors; Gossip; The Feeling; KT Tunstall; Get Cape. Wear Cape. Fly; The Subways; Kate Nash	Jay-Z; Amy Winehouse; Manu Chao; The Raconteurs; James Blunt; Crowded House; Seasick Steve; Martha Wainwright; Shakin' Stevens	The Verve; Leonard Cohen; Goldfrapp; Neil Diamond; John Mayer; Brian Jonestown Massacre; Gilbert O'Sullivan; Martina Topley Bird

=== Other stage ===
Friday	Saturday	Sunday
Panic! at the Disco; The Enemy; We Are Scientists; Foals; The Hoosiers; Ben Folds; Vampire Weekend; Joe Lean & The Jing Jang Jong; The Rascals; Ida Maria	Massive Attack; Hot Chip; Elbow; Duffy; The Wombats; Neon Neon; Black Kids; One Night Only; Los Campesinos!; Golden Silvers; The Travelling Band	Groove Armada; The Zutons; Pigeon Detectives; Scouting for Girls; Mark Ronson; Jack Peñate; Newton Faulkner; Black Mountain; Hoodoo Gurus; Black Cherry

=== Park stage ===
Friday	Saturday	Sunday
Pete Doherty; Dizzee Rascal; John Cale; Franz Ferdinand (Special Guest, replacing Babyshambles); Edwyn Collins; The Duke Spirit; Operator Please; Sons & Daughters; Santogold; Beggars; Magic Wands; Island Line; The Langley Sisters	Cansei de Ser Sexy (CSS); Battles; MGMT; (Special Guest The Last Shadow Puppets with Jack White and Matt Helders); Shlomo; Kool Keith; Guilty Pleasures; Alphabeat; St. Vincent; Jape; Eugene Mcguinness	My Morning Jacket; Tunng; Saki Cult; Laura Marling; Mystery Jets; Kathryn Williams & Neil MacColl; The Cave Singers; Alberta Cross; Mumford & Sons; lan Tyler & The Lost Sons; Redbridge Brass Band

=== John Peel stage ===
Friday	Saturday	Sunday
The Cribs; Reverend and the Makers; The Kills; MGMT; The Ting Tings; The Young Knives; Lightspeed Champion; Make Model; Glasvegas; Hadouken!; Patrick Watson; Royworld	Biffy Clyro; The Futureheads; Band of Horses; The Black Lips; Vampire Weekend; The Courteeners; British Sea Power; Holy Fuck; The Teenagers; Hilltop Hoods; Emmy the Great; Dogtanion	The National; Spiritualized; Crystal Castles; ~~The Long Blondes~~; Blood Red Shoes; The Stars; Rocket Summer; Friendly Fires; The Whip; Yeasayer; Fucking Idiots; Rocketeer

=== Acoustic stage ===
Friday	Saturday	Sunday
Seasick Steve; Sinéad O'Connor; The Blockheads; Arno Carstens; Eddi Reader; Camille O’Sullivan; Eleanor McEvoy; Devon Sproule; Acoustic Stage Blues Club With Grainne Duffy	Gilbert O'Sullivan; The Swell Season Featuring Glen Hansard & Marketa Irglova; Glenn Tilbrook & The Fluffers; Seth Lakeman; Andy Fairweather Low & The Low Riders; Thea Gilmore; Sid Griffin & The Coal Porters; Emily Maguire; Acoustic Stage Blues Club With Grainne Duffy; The Travelling Band	Joan Baez; Suzanne Vega; The London Community Gospel Choir; Stackridge; Tom Baxter; Tift Merritt; Foy Vance; Acoustic Stage Blues Club With Grainne Duffy; Amsterdam; Lazenby

=== Jazzworld stage ===
Friday	Saturday	Sunday
Jimmy Cliff; Estelle; Fun Lovin Criminals; Lupe Fiasco; Candi Staton; Alabama 3; Soha; Phantom Limb; Mankala	Ethiopiques; Buddy Guy; Imagined Village; Joan Armatrading; Eric Bibb; Massukos; The Blessing; The Neil Cowley Trio; Bedouin Jerry Can Band	Manu Chao; King Solomon Burke; Eddy Grant; Dub Colossus; Asere & Billy Cobham; Balkan Beat Box; Almasala; Portico Quartet; Sense of Sound

=== Other major performers on small stages ===
- Avalon Stage: The Wurzels, Will Young, The Proclaimers, Katie Melua
- Leftfield Stage: The Levellers, Kate Nash, Get Cape Wear Cape Fly, Reverend and the Makers, The Bluetones, Aleks and the Drummer
- Queen's Head: One Night Only, Kate Nash, Pigeon Detectives, Elbow, Santigold, Glasvegas, Ladyhawke
- Dance East Stage: Fatboy Slim, Róisín Murphy, Sneaky Sound System
- Guardian Stage: Estelle, Newton Faulkner, The Wombats
