= Jekka McVicar =

British gardener (born 1951)

- Born: Jessica Stanley Clarke; 1951 (age 73–74); Chew Magna, Somerset, England
- Occupations: Horticulturalist; author; broadcaster
- Known for: Jekka's Complete Herb Book; Seeds
- Website: jekkas.com

Jessica "Jekka" McVicar (born 1951) is an English organic gardening expert, author, and broadcaster, particularly on the cultivation and use of herbs.

== Biography ==
Born Jessica Stanley Clarke, she was brought up in Chew Magna, Somerset, and learned about the use of herbs from her grandmother, writer Ruth Lowinsky, and her mother. At the age of seventeen, after leaving Cranborne Chase School in Wiltshire, Clarke joined the progressive rock band Marsupilami as a singer and flautist. The band released two albums, appeared at the Isle of Wight Festival and the first Glastonbury Festival, and toured in Europe. In 1973, Clarke played the role of Jessie, a flautist, in the Doctor Who serial The Green Death.

After working for a time at the drama department of the BBC, Clarke found employment at a herb nursery in Somerset. She married Ian "Mac" McVicar in 1976, and in 1987, they established a herb farm—now known as Jekka's Herb Farm—at Alveston, near Bristol. They have the largest collection of culinary herbs in the UK, with more than 500 different varieties.

McVicar has published several successful books, notably Jekka's Complete Herb Book and Seeds, which have been reprinted in association with the Royal Horticultural Society. She also regularly contributes to a number of national publications, including BBC Gardener's World Magazine, BBC Good Food, Gardens Illustrated, and The Guardian newspaper.

In 2016, McVicar was appointed honorary vice president of the RHS. She is also an RHS Ambassador for Health & Wellbeing.

== Awards ==
- 1993: RHS Gold medal, RHS Hampton Court Flower Show
- 1994: RHS Gold medal, RHS Chelsea Flower Show
- 2007 & 2008: Tudor Rose, RHS Hampton Court Flower Show
- 2009: RHS Lawrence Award, RHS Chelsea Flower Show
- 2012: Garden Media Guild Lifetime Achievement Award, "for services to horticulture, design, education and communication and excellence in the field of organic herb growing"
- 2017: Victoria Medal of Honour
- 2024: Prince Edward Award for Excellence in Horticultural Career Development

== Bibliography ==
- The Complete Herb Book (also published as Jekka's Complete Herb Book) (1994)
- Herbs for the Home: A Definitive Sourcebook to Growing and Using Herbs (1995)
- Jekka's Aromatic Herbs: A Guide to Growing and Enjoying Aromatic Herbs (1995)
- Jekka's Cottage Garden Herbs: A Guide to Growing and Cooking Delicious Herbs (1995)
- Jekka's Medicinal Herbs: A Guide to Growing and Using Medicinal Herbs (1997)
- Jekka's Culinary Herbs: A Guide to Growing and Using Herbs for the Kitchen (1997)
- Good Enough to Eat: Growing Edible Flowers and Cooking with Them (also published as Cooking with Flowers) (1997)
- Seeds: The Ultimate Guide to Growing Successfully from Seed (2003)
- New Book of Herbs (2003)
- Jekka's Herb Cookbook (2010)
- Jekka's Pocketful of Herbs (2019)
- 100 Herbs to Grow (2024)
