= The Travelling Band =

English rock band

- Origin: Manchester, England
- Genres: Alternative rock, indie folk
- Years active: 2006–present
- Labels: Sideways Saloon; Cooking Vinyl
- Members: Adam Gorman; Jo Dudderidge; Nick Vaal; Harry Smith; Sam Quinn
- Past members: Snaf Ballinger; Steve Mullen; Chris Spencer
- Website: The Travelling Band

The English indie Travelling Band formed in 2006 and based in Manchester. The band members are Jo Dudderidge (lead vocals, acoustic guitar, hammond organ/piano, electric guitar), Adam P. Gorman (lead vocal, electric guitar, synth) and Nick Vaal (drums, percussion), Harry Fausing Smith (violin, sax, guitars, vocals) and Sam Quinn (bass guitar). Previous full-time members include Steve 'Snaf" Ballinger (vocals, guitars, keys), Steve 'Mugger' Mullen (lead guitar) and Chris 'Spenny' Spencer (bass guitar). Previous touring members include Chris Hillman (electric guitar, pedal steel), Tanah Stevens (viola) and Hannah Nicholson (violin).

The band have released four studio albums Under the Pavement (2008), Screaming is Something (2011) and The Big Defreeze (2014) and SAILS (2017). They have also released two EP's If this is a gag, i'm in. (2007) and The Redemption of Mr Tom (2008) as well as two live albums Arrears Not Careers (2010) and Live at The Met (2014).

== History ==
The Travelling Band formed during a recording project in 2006 in Williamsburg, Brooklyn. The band recorded their debut studio album 'Under The Pavement' with producer (and former Joan Jett and Steve Earle guitarist) Eric 'Roscoe' Ambel, which was later released in the UK in November 2008 to receiving critical acclaim from the UK media. The album featured as BBC Radio 6 Music 'Album of the Day', BBC Radio 2's 'Single of the Week' with the song "Only Waiting", which also featured in the TV series Skins (Series 3, Ep. 8). Album track "Angel of the Morning" also featured in the Ian Dury biopic Sex & Drugs & Rock & Roll.

Although the tracking for Under the Pavement was completed after a second session in NYC in October 2007, the album did not appear for another 12 months and was finally issued on their own 'Sideways Saloon' imprint—also the moniker of their Manchester-based, monthly club night. Two hand-crafted, cloth-packaged EPs helped to create a local buzz in the run up to the album's release, while acclaim came from further afield when the band won the Glastonbury Festival 2008 New Talent award. Festival organiser Michael Eavis personally chose the band as winners and said of the band – "they take me back to my roots... marvellous music to savour and enjoy".

The band toured extensively for two years following their debut's release with appearances at Glastonbury Festival, End of the Road, NXNE (Toronto) and Tbilisi Open Air Festival (Georgia). In 2009, the band became the first British act to visit and perform in Kosovo performing several times in Podujevo and Pristina as part of a peaceful commemoration organised by Manchester Aid to Kosovo (MAK) of a massacre that had taken place in Podujevo in 1999 during the Kosovo War.

In 2010, the band began to record their second album with an initial recording session on the Isle of Mull followed by overdubs in their home studio set ups and at Moolah Rogue Studios in Stockport. They returned to New York City to perform at CMJ Festival and it was during this trip that they were scouted by Cooking Vinyl Publishing. In 2011, The Travelling Band signed with the record label, Cooking Vinyl to release their self-produced second studio album Screaming Is Something, recorded on the Isle of Mull, which received notable reviews. The band toured extensively that year with notable appearances at SXSW Festival, Green Man Festival and Cropredy.

In April 2011, the band performed at two fundraisers for the charity compilation Ten which was curated by lead singer Jo Dudderidge. The album featured Manchester artists and bands such as Elbow, Cherry Ghost, Doves, Josephine Oniyama, Liz Green, Jo Rose and Liam Frost as well as The Travelling Band who performed with Badly Drawn Boy as his band on the launch nights. The album sales and concerts raised over £15,000 for the Manchester Aid to Kosovo charity. Further fundraisers took place at the Eden Project in Cornwall where the band performed alongside Fleet Foxes, The Flaming Lips and The Bees on two separate occasions.

In early 2012, the band took a break from the road and began writing third album. They ran a successful crowd funded Pledge Music campaign which they raised the money to record with producer Iestyn Polson (Patti Smith, David Gray) at The Church Studios in Crouch End, London. The album was released in the UK and Europe in August 2014 on Sideways Saloon via Republic of Music. The band embarked on a UK tour later that year and with notable festival performances including their second appearance at Cropredy.

In late 2015 the band founded Pinhole Sound Studios in Manchester and began writing and recording what would become their fourth album Sails. In 2016 the band met American artist Lissie and became her touring band and opening act for her 2016 UK and European tour.

Sails was released on August 25, 2017. Louder than War said it was "a testament to their individuality, as well as their inventiveness as musicians". AmericanaUK pondered if "this could be the album to take them to the next level". The band continued to hit the road - again accompanying Lissie on her European 'Castle's' tour in 2018 before going on hiatus after 12 years on the road finishing with a Christmas show at YES in Manchester in December 2018.

The band have appeared twice since for charity events - Manchester Aid to Kosovo's - 'Concert for Kosovo' in September 2019, and in August 2021 as part of the 'Concert for John', organised in celebration of the life of John Hall and his contribution to Manchester music's grassroots scene.

In August 2023 the band announced a return to the stage with a comeback performance at the legendary Trades Club in Hebden Bridge.

== Theft of equipment ==
In December 2014, The Travelling Band made headlines in the national press after their van containing £30,000 of equipment was stolen from a street in Levenshulme, Manchester. The band appealed for help on social media and their story was quickly picked up by many local news outlets including the Manchester Evening News and BBC Manchester before being published in the NME and the Daily Mirror. On 12 December, Greater Manchester Police announced that they had recovered both the van and equipment and The Travelling Band later announced a special one-off gig at The Deaf Institute in Manchester to celebrate the return of their van and thank their fans for the help in the recovery of the vehicle.

== Discography ==
=== Albums ===
- Under The Pavement (2008)
- Arrears Not Careers – live album (2010)
- Screaming Is Something (2011)
- Live at The Met (2014)
- The Big Defreeze (2014)
- Sails (2017)

=== Singles and EPs ===
- "If This is a Gag, I'm In" EP (2007)
- "Only Waiting" (2007)
- "The Redemption of Mr Tom" EP (2008)
- "Desolate Icicle" (2008)
- "The Horizon, Me And You" (2009)
- "Sundial" (2010)
- "Fairweather Friends" (2011)
- "Sundial mmxi" (2011)
- "Battlescars" (2011)
- "Hands Up" (2013)
- "Passing Ships" (2014)
- "Pinhole Sounds Volume One" (2016)
- "Into the Water" (2017)
- "Last Night (I Dreamt of Killing You)" (2017)
- "Mopping Forwards" (2017)
