= She Drew the Gun =

Band from Wirral, England

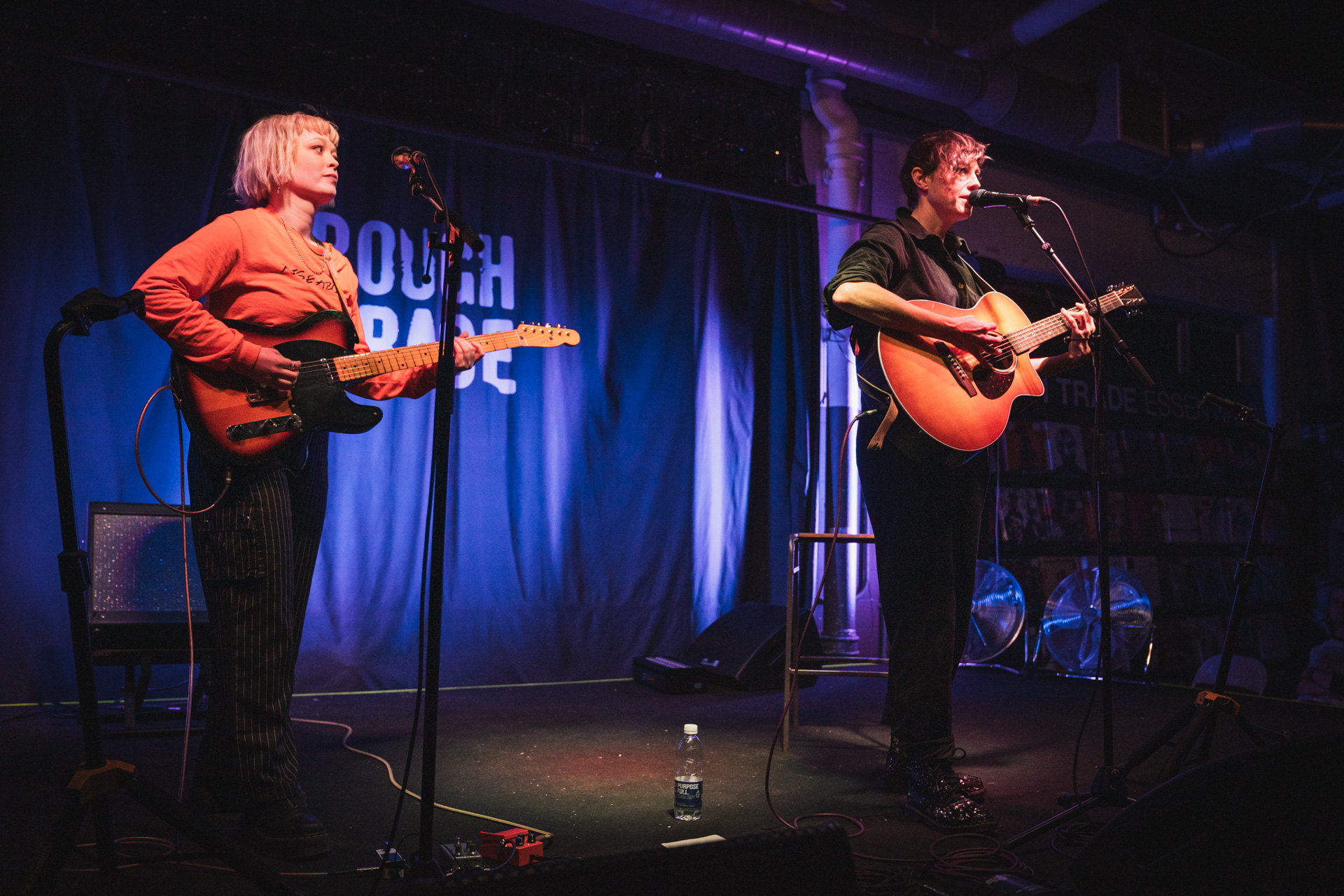
- in November 2024

Background information
- Origin: Wirral, England
- Genres: Psych pop
- Years active: 2013–present
- Label: Submarine Cat
- Members: Jimmy Moon; Louisa Roach; Anna Donigan; Siân Monaghan
- Website: www.shedrewthegun.com

She Drew the Gun is a band from Wirral, England, fronted by singer/songwriter Louisa Roach. They won the Glastonbury Festival Emerging Talent competition in 2016. Their music is described as psych pop and is known for its often political lyrics.

== Background ==
She Drew the Gun started as a solo project for Louisa Roach. Gradually she formed a four-piece live band and toured the UK supporting The Sundowners in early 2015, before signing with Skeleton Key Records. The 2016 incarnation of the band included drummer Sian Monaghan, guitarist Jack Turner and multi-instrumentalist Jenni Kickhefer.

In 2016, the band along with numerous other celebrities, toured the UK to support Jeremy Corbyn's bid to become Prime Minister.

In April 2016, She Drew the Gun was chosen from a long-list of 120 entries to the Glastonbury Festival Emerging Artists competition. After performing with the other seven finalists, they were named as winners with a prize of £5000 and a slot on one of Glastonbury Festival's main stages. They performed on the John Peel Stage on Sunday 26 June.

Singles from their debut album, Memories of Another Future, were playlisted on BBC Radio 6.

In 2017, the band performed at the SXSW festival before going on their own UK tour. In 2018 they went on a UK tour to promote their second album Revolution of Mind, which was released on 5 October. Clash magazine described the album as "a confident, immersive sophomore effort" and "a stellar return from a truly important group".

== Band members ==
- Jimmy Moon – guitarist
- Abbi Phillips – drums, percussion, backing vocals
- Louisa Roach – lead vocals, guitar
- Lucy Styles – keyboards, synthesiser, guitarist, backing vocals
- Jack Turner – bass, lead guitar

== Discography ==
=== Studio albums ===
- Memories of Another Future (original release 22 April 2016, expanded version released 17 March 2017, Skeleton Key)
- Revolution of Mind (released 5 October 2018, Skeleton Key)
- Behave Myself (1 October 2021, Submarine Cat)
- Howl (15 November 2024, Submarine Cat)

=== EPs ===
- Chains (2013)
- Trouble Every Day (2019)

=== Singles ===
- "Since You Were Not Mine" (15 April 2015)
- "If You Could See" (15 January 2015)
- "Where I End and You Begin" (2015)
- "Poem" (8 April 2016)
- "Pit Pony" (2016)
- "No Hole in My Head" (2017)
- "Thank You" (2017)
- "Sweet Harmony" (2017)
- "Resister" (2018)
- "Revolution of the Mind" (2018)
- "Something for the Pain" (2018)
- "Paradise" (2019)
- "Wolf and Bird" (2019)
- "Cut Me Down" (2021)
- "Behave Myself" (2021)
