= Whirl-Y-Gig =

Dance club in London

Whirl-Y-Gig is the longest-running world music dance club in London, England. It was set up by Ros Madden as an experiment of the Association of Humanistic Psychology in 1981, who passed it on to Richard Sutcliffe (also known as DJ Monkey Pilot) and Mary Sutcliffe four years later. Madden died on 20 October 2011 in Luton. Richard Sutcliffe plays a wide range of music genres in the club, primarily world music/dance music fusions.

Whirl-Y-Gig also appears at festivals, featuring both live bands and DJ sessions. Whirl-y-Gig has hosted stages at the first Phoenix festival, seven years at WOMAD in Reading, Guilfest, Beautiful Days, Canterbury Fayre, the Whitby Musicport Festival and at the first Sunrise Celebration. They also run their own record label called Whirl-Y-Music and have organised their own festival, the Whirl-Y-Fayre, which first took place in August 2013, and has taken place every summer since.

Whirl-Y-Gig's have featured artists such as Banco de Gaia, System 7, Dreadzone, Astralasia, Eat Static, Loop Guru, Baka Beyond, Transglobal Underground, Another Green World, Snakestyle, and Kamel Nitrate.

Whirl-Y-Gig celebrated its 21st anniversary in 2002, at which point it was one of the longest-running club nights in the United Kingdom. Whirl-y-Gig were still active at the start of 2025.
