= Helen Gregory =

Professional Historian of Queensland, Australia

- Born: 21 March 1946; Brisbane, Queensland, Australia
- Died: 15 October 2025 (aged 79); Brisbane, Queensland, Australia
- Education: University of Queensland (BA)
- Occupation: Historian
- Known for: Brisbane History Group

Helen Gregory OAM (21 March 1946 – 15 October 2025) was a historian, author and public servant in Brisbane, Queensland, Australia.

She was born in Brisbane in 1946.

She gained a BA (Hons) from the University of Queensland and was a former adjunct professor of that institution.

In 1969, Gregory was the first Queensland woman to be offered a Rotary Overseas Postgraduate Scholarship, but was unable to take up the award.

Gregory taught in the Department of History at the University of Queensland and was an adjunct professor of the university. She also taught and in the School of Built Environment at the Queensland University of Technology.

In the mid 1970s she was a consultant historian to the private and government sectors, and is believed to have been the first graduate historian in Queensland to use her training in this way, demonstrating that privately commissioned histories could be undertaken without sacrificing academic standards or ethical integrity. She was the founder of the Brisbane History Group and the Professional Historians' Association (Queensland), the professional association which promotes the interests of consulting historians in Queensland, and maintains standards of practice.

Gregory was the author or co-author of many academic articles and studies and several entries in the Australian Dictionary of Biography and, with Deborah Witnell, the chapter on the first female Chief Justice of Australia Susan Kiefel in "A woman's place : 100 years of Queensland women lawyers". In 2023 Gregory delivered the Selden Society Australia lecture in the Supreme Court of Queensland on the "Queensland Law Society: serving ‘conscientious, honest lawyers’"

Gregory became the first chair of the Queensland Heritage Council in 1992, and subsequently became director of cultural heritage in the Queensland Government's Environment and Heritage department (later renamed the Environmental Protection Agency, the first woman to be appointed to a senior executive position in that department.

In 2005 and subsequent years, Gregory was a judge of the History Book Award for the Queensland Premier's Literary Awards. In 2006 Gregory was a member of the independent panel that suggested the name for the Eleanor Schonell Bridge to the Lord Mayor of Brisbane and in November 2007 she was appointed to the board of trustees of Newstead House, Brisbane.

Gregory died on 15 October 2025 following a short illness. She was married to Scott Gregory, and had three sons.

In the 2026 King's Birthday Honours, Gregory was posthumously recognised with a Medal of the Order of Australia for her services to community history.

== Children and Grandchildren ==
Helen Gregory had 3 children, Robert Gregory, Peter Gregory and Mike Gregory. Helen had 7 Grandchildren, Piper, Tessa, Cooper, Jim, Liam, Molly, and Anne.

== Publications ==
- Gregory, Helen (2008). Playing For Keeps : C&K's first century, 1907-2007. Newmarket, Queensland: Creche and Kindergarten Association of Queensland. ISBN 978-0-908499-57-1.
- Gregory, Helen (2007). Brisbane Then & Now. Wingfield, South Australia: Bookwise International. ISBN 978-1-74173-011-1.
- Gregory, Helen (2007). Capturing Law And History : One Hundred Years of Queensland Law Reporting. Brisbane, Queensland: Supreme Court of Queensland Library. ISBN 978-0-9803220-2-6.
- Gregory, Helen (2006). Expressions of Mercy : A History of the Mater Hospitals 1906-2006. St Lucia, Queensland: University of Queensland Press. ISBN 0-7022-3539-3.
- Gregory, Helen & Johnston, W. Ross (2004). Women of the West. Rockhampton, Queensland: Central Queensland University Press. ISBN 1-876780-40-1.
- Gregory, Helen (2003). A Century of Sail: The South Brisbane Sailing Club 1903-2003. South Brisbane, Queensland: South Brisbane Sailing Club. ISBN 0-646-42640-0.
- Gregory, Helen (1996). The Brisbane River Story: Meanders Through Time. Brisbane, Queensland: Australian Marine Conservation Society. ISBN 0-646-30132-2.
- Gregory, Helen & Kowald, Margaret (1993). Women on Course: The McLeod Country Golf Club, 1968-1993. Mt. Ommaney, Queensland: Boolarong Publications. ISBN 0-646-15437-0.
- Gregory, Helen & Brazil, Cecilia (1993). Bearers of the Tradition : Nurses of The Royal Brisbane Hospital, 1888-1993. Bowen Hills, Brisbane, Queensland: Boolarong Publications. ISBN 0-646-16196-2.
- Gregory, Helen (1993). UQ Alumni: The First Twenty-Five Years of the Alumni Association of the University of Queensland. Brisbane, Queensland: CopyRight Publishing. ISBN 1-875401-19-9.
- Johnston, W. Ross; Gregory, Helen & Harrison, Jennifer (1992). Managing the Land: Index to the Lands Department Papers, Queensland votes and proceedings, 1880-1899. Brisbane, Queensland: Dept. of History, University of Queensland. ISBN 978-0-8677-6485-7.
- Gregory, Helen (1991). Making Maroochy: A History of the Land, the People and the Shire. Nambour, Queensland: Boolarong Publications. ISBN 0-646-04469-9.
- Gregory, Helen (1991). The Queensland Law Society Inc. 1928-1988: A History. Brisbane, Queensland: Queensland Law Society. ISBN 978-1-8755-3606-1.
- Gregory, Helen, ed. (1990). Arcadian Simplicity: J. B. Fewings memoirs of Toowong. Brisbane, Queensland: Library Board of Queensland. ISBN 0-86439-110-2.
- Gregory, Helen (1988). A Tradition of Care: A History of Nursing at the Royal Brisbane Hospital. Brisbane, Queensland: Boolarong Publications. ISBN 0-86439-064-5.
- Gregory, Helen (1987). Vivant Professores: Distinguished Members of the University of Queensland, 1910-1940. St Lucia, Queensland: University of Queensland Library. ISBN 0-908471-09-2.
- Gregory, Helen & Johnston, Ross (1980–1989). A Register of some Administrative Divisions in Queensland 1850-1891.
- Gregory, Helen & Henricksen, Noel (1977). A Church for its Times: The Story of S. Thomas' Church, Toowong. Toowong, Queensland: Anglican Parish of Toowong. ISBN 978-0-6464-7589-9. With a foreword by The Archbishop of Brisbane, the Most Reverend Felix Arnott.
