= Marsupilami (band) =

English progressive rock band

Marsupilami were an English progressive rock band active in the early 1970s. Their name was taken from a famous Belgian comics character created by Belgian artist André Franquin. In 1969, the band toured with Deep Purple, and played at the opening of the Isle of Wight Festival when King Crimson withdrew. They released two albums, Marsupilami (1970) and Arena (1971), on Transatlantic Records. The albums were reissued on Cherry Red Records in 2007. The band briefly reunited for gigs in 2011.

== Personnel ==
- Mike Fouracre – Drums
- Fred Hasson – Vocals, harmonica, words and music
- Leary Hasson – Keyboards and music
- Richard Lathom Hicks – Bass
- Dave Laverock – Guitar, vocals, words and music
- Jessica Stanley Clarke – Flute and vocals
- Peter Bardens – Percussion and producer of Arena
- Mandi Riedelbauch – Woodwinds on 'Arena'
- Bob West – Vocals and words on 'Arena'
- Paul Dunmall – Tenor and soprano saxes and flute

== Discography ==
- Marsupilami (Transatlantic TRA 213) 1970
- Arena (Transatlantic TRA 230) 1971

== After Marsupilami ==
Singer Jessica Stanley Clarke later became known as Jekka McVicar, who is one of the UK's best-known organic gardening experts, and proprietor of Jekka's Herb Farm near Bristol.

Fred Hasson has followed a career in media industries – TV, dotcom and video games, but can sometimes be seen at jam sessions in London playing harmonica.

Leary Hasson still lives on the farm the band rehearsed in, and still plays in a number of local outfits.

Bob West is now an artist living in France.

Mike Fouracre works at the Arts Council.

Paul Dunmall is still playing on the free jazz circuit with Keith Tippett and others.
