= Manchester Aid to Kosovo =

Manchester Aid to Kosovo (MAK) is a Manchester based charity. It is dedicated to providing aid and support to the peoples of Kosovo.

== History ==
MAK was started by five Manchester men in a pub. Their response to the unfolding reports of ethnic cleansing in Kosovo, caught the imagination of the Greater Manchester people. Within two weeks a convoy of 300 tonnes of aid was on its way from Manchester to Kosovo Albanians in refugee camps in Albania. 850,000 Kosovo Albanians fled the province. Within a year MAK transported a 1,000 tons of crisis aid to the region; MAK is committed to supporting the recovery of the people of Kosovo in both Kosovo and in the United Kingdom. Kosovo is administrated by the United Nations.

MAK has partnered with InterVol, a student-led international volunteering charity, to provide international volunteers for projects in the Podujevo region of Kosovo.
