= Honky (duo) =

British hip-hop duo

- Origin: Doncaster, Yorkshire
- Genres: Hip hop
- Years active: 1993–96
- Labels: ZTT Records, Higher Ground Records

Honky was a duo from Doncaster, England, made up of Kye Wright and Matt Ellis.

== History ==
Producer Ellis and rapper Wright were signed to ZTT Records in 1993, and their first EP, Honky Doodle Day, spent a week in the UK singles charts. The duo had four more hits over the next three years, albeit none making the top 40; "The Whistler" was one place shy in February 1994, pipped to the 40 spot by Coronation Street actor Bill Tarmey.

== Discography ==
Albums

- The Ego Has Landed, 1994
- Kuljit, 1996

Singles

Year	Single	Peak chart positions
Year	Single	UK
1993	Honky Doodle Day EP	61
1994	"Love Thy Neighbour"	–
1994	"The Whistler"	41
1996	"Hip Hop Don't Ya Drop"	70
1996	"What's Goin Down"	49
"—" denotes releases that did not chart.
