= Palace (band) =

British alternative rock band

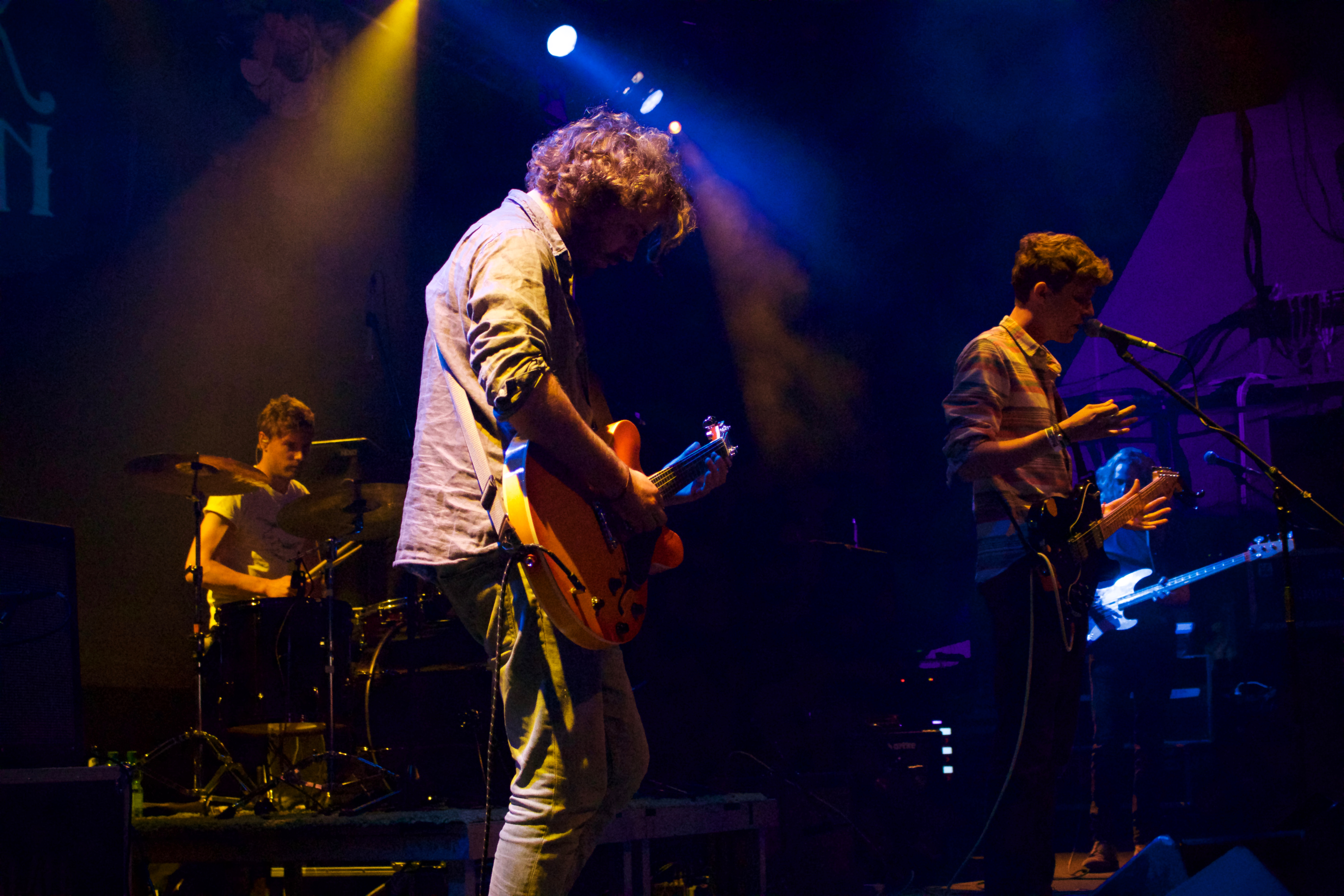
- Hodges, Turner & Wyndham of Palace performing in 2016

Background information
- Origin: London
- Genre: Alternative rock
- Years active: 2012-present
- Members: Leo Wyndham; Rupert Turner; Matt Hodges
- Past members: Will Dorey
- Website: https://www.wearepalace.com

Palace is a British alternative rock band from London. The band has released five full-length studio albums.

== History ==
Palace formed as a 4-piece band on 15 September 2012 and comprised Leo Wyndham, Rupert Turner, Will Dorey, and Matt Hodges. They released their debut EP titled Lost in the Night. In 2015, Palace released their second EP titled Chase The Light. In 2016, Palace released their first full-length album titled So Long Forever. Will Dorey left the band in 2017, now cultivating his new musical project called Skinshape. In 2019, the now newly 3-piece band released their second full-length album titled Life After. On 21 January 2022, Palace released their third full-length album titled Shoals. On 5 April 2024, Palace released their fourth album, Ultrasound, then with just over a two year gap, on 18 September 2026 released their fifth album, Ox.

The band have performed several headlining tours worldwide, in addition to playing at major festivals including Glastonbury (2016, 2019) and Coachella (2024).

== Band members ==
Current members

- Leo Wyndham – lead vocals, guitars (2012–present)
- Rupert Turner – guitars, backing vocals (2012–present)
- Matt Hodges – drums, percussion, backing vocals (2012–present)

Former members

- Will Dorey – bass, backing vocals (2012–2017)

== Discography ==
=== Studio albums ===
- So Long Forever (2016)
- Life After (2019)
- Shoals (2022)
- Ultrasound (2024)
- Ox (2026)

=== EPs ===
- Lost in the Night (2014)
- Chase the Light (2015)
- The Hoxa Sessions (2020)
- Someday, Somewhere (2020)
- Part I – When Everything Was Lost (2023)
- Part II – Nightmares & Ice Cream (2023)
- Greyhound (2025)
- Dream On (2026)
