= Black Cherry (band) =

- Origin: London, United Kingdom
- Genres: Electro, pop
- Years active: 2007–present
- Labels: Black Cherry, Island, Def Jam, Digital Distribution
- Members: Megane Quashie; Guilhem Fraisse
- Past members: Robert Moore

Black Cherry are a British/French electro pop band. The band was formed in London in 2007 by singer/songwriter Megane Quashie, drummer/producer Guilhem Fraisse and guitarist Robert Moore. After performing at Glastonbury 2008 on The Other Stage as well as many other festivals that year, Black Cherry release their first EP 'This is Control' in the beginning of 2009 and embarked on an American Tour. After playing a number of festivals including Hungary's Balaton Sounds the band lost guitarist Robert Moore after he died. The band's second EP "The Preface" was dedicated to his memory.

After playing at Glastonbury Festival again in 2010, festival organiser Michael Eavis called Black Cherry "The best looking band at the festival". In 2011, they played at South by Southwest Festival and toured America. In Summer, the band announced the release of their double A-Side "One Another"/"Lost in the System" on 29 August to be distributed by Island/Def Jam Records and received positive reviews in The Guardian Newspaper. The band are currently working on a full-length album.

== Members ==
- Megane Quashie – lead vocals, guitar, synths
- Guilhem Fraisse – drums

Additional touring members

- Kay Watson – synths, backing vocals
- Jamie McDonald – guitar, backing vocals

== Discography ==
=== EPs ===
"The Preface" track list
No.	Title	Length
1.	"Modern Lover"	3:10
2.	"Fake Blood"	3:29
3.	"Modern Lover (Killer Whale remix)"	5:39
4.	"Fake Blood (Yam Who? remix)"	3:59
5.	"Diamonds & Pearls"	3:18

"This is Control" track list
No.	Title	Length
1.	"Radio"	3:33
2.	"Control"	3:39
3.	"Cops and Robbers"	3:53
4.	"Insecure"	3:35

=== Advertising ===
- 'Modern Lover' off their forthcoming album White Gold was used in a J.C. Penney advertising campaign.
- 'One Another' off their forthcoming album White Gold was used in a Brown Thomas advertising campaign.
