= Atomic Hooligan =

DJ/production duo

Atomic Hooligan are a DJ/production duo from Watford, Hertfordshire, England, consisting of Matt Welch and Terry Ryan.

The duo released their first 12" single, "Servin' it Up", on Botchit & Scarper in 2001. They subsequently released several singles and mix CDs on the label, leading to their debut album, You Are Here, in 2005. The album was later licensed to Village Again/Side Out in Japan. In 2006, it won 'Album of the Year' at the International Breakspoll Awards. Singles from the album include "Just One More," "Head" (featuring Pav), "Seven 10 Split" (featuring Justine Berry from Hey Gravity), and the Aquasky remix of "Wait 'Til Your Sleeping" (featuring Carpet Face).

In 2008, Atomic Hooligan won Best Live Act at the International Breakspoll Awards for their live tour supporting their first album. That same year, they released their second album, Sex, Drugs & Blah Blah Blah.

Atomic Hooligan has produced remixes for Underworld (Born Slippy, Cowgirl), The Egg, Lee Coombes, Tayo, Chris Carter, Aquasky, Ils, Paranoid Jack, and DJ Hal.

In addition to DJing, the duo has performed as a live band. They played in the dance tent at the 2024 edition of Glastonbury Festival. Their DJ sets incorporate breaks, hip-hop, house, drum & bass, techno, and turntablism.

== Discography ==
=== Releases ===
- Serving it up EP/ Botchit Breaks/BBV003/ 2000
- The Showdown w/ Jason Sparks /Botchit and Scarper / bos2030 / 2001
- In it Together / Botchit and Scarper / bos2lp 013 sampler / 2001
- Club Shaker/2001 / Botchit Breaks/BBV006 2001
- Music we Play / 2002 / Botchit Breaks / / 2002
- Larger than Life Feat Cousin Vini / Botchit and Scarper / boslp015lp sampler / 2002
- Dreams of life/Backchat / 2S2/ 2S2 007/ 2002
- The Highs and Lows / Botchit and Scarper / Botchit and scarper / bos2lp 017
- Viper/ Distinctive/ Y4K005EP1 /2002
- SnowBlind w/ LBJ / Botchit and Scarper / bos2cdlp 018 / 2003
- B.T.P.2 / 6am Begel / Botchit & Scarper / bos2044 / 2003
- Left Hand / Trigger – Botchit and Scarper / TRIG 001 / 2003
- Shine a Light Feat Sweet Hustler/ Botchit and Scarper / bos2047 / 2004
- Shine a Light Feat Sweet Hustler (Remix's)/ Botchit and Scarper / bos2047r / 2004
- Head / Just one More / Botchit and Scarper / bos2050 / 2004
- Seven 10 Split / Botchit and Scarper / bos2052 / 2005

=== Remixes ===
- Digital Pimp/Evolutionary Blueprint (A Hooligan Remix) / Collision / COLR001/ 2001
- Chris Carter / Echo Babylon (Atomic Hooligan Remix) / Botchit Breaks/ BBV011 / 2002
- Kraddy / Wiggidi (Atomic Hooligan Remix) / Muti / Muti004 / 2002
- DJ Era / Comedown (Atomic Hooligan Remix) / Unstable / no Cat No. / 2002
- Elizabeth Troy & UK Apache / Forever Young (A Hooligan Remix) / bos2036 / Botchit and scarper/2002
- Aquasky vs Mblaster Ft Ragga Twins/All in Check(A Hooligan Remix)/ Botchit&Scarper / bos2039/2003
- Tayo & Precision Cuts / Fire Good (Atomic Hooligan Remix) / MOB / MOB9002 / 2003
- Underworld / Cowgirl (Atomic Hooligan Remix) / JBO (Internal CD) / 2003
- Underworld / Born Slippy (Atomic Hooligan Remix) / JBO / JBO5024703 / 2003
- Sons of Slough / Real People (A Hooligan Remix) / Bedrock Breaks / BEDMK01CD / 2004
- The Egg / The Wall (Atomic Hooligan Remix) / Square Peg / SQPG12001 / 2004
- Paranoid Jack&Robb G / Disaster (Atomic Hooligan Remix) / Promo records 2005
- Lee Coombs / Obsessional rhythm (Atomic Hooligan Remix) / Finger Lickin / 2005
- JCat / Good times (Atomic Hooligan Remix) / Menu Music / Menu002 / 2005
- Myagi / Dirty Girls (Atomic Hooligan Remix) / Money Shot /money0046 /2005
- Ils / Lovin you (Atomic Hooligan Remix) / Distinctive /DISNT161
- Shafunkas / Man Woman Club (Atomic Hooligan Remix) / Spin Out / ?
- Hey Gravity / Inside Out (Atomic Hooligan Remix) / Riser Records / ?

=== Mix CDS ===
- 4 Vini / Botchit and Scarper / boslp015 / 2002
- Botchit Breaks 5 / Botchit and Scarper /BOSCD017LP / 2003
- DJ Mag International Allstars / DJ 363 / 2004-11-12
- Atomic Hooligan & Jay Cunning / Beatz & Bobz Vol.5/ Functional /fb0092 / 2005

=== Albums ===
- You are Here (CD version) / Botchit and Scarper / BOSCDLP23 / 2005
1. Seven 10 Split
2. Head
3. Shine a light
4. Who stole monkeys clothes
5. The Birch
6. Wait til you're sleeping
7. Spitball
8. Pump friction
9. Dreaming
10. Steal the sun
11. Twelve hundred miles
12. Superstar Junkie
13. Just one more
14. You are here
- Sex, Drugs And Blah Blah Blah / Botchit and Scarper / 2008
1. Dirty
2. I Don't Care
3. Who's Ya Daddy Now?
4. Papercuts
5. Inside The Mind
6. Do Me In
7. Spread Good Vibes
8. Safeguard
9. Weed
10. Blah Blah Blah
11. String Vest
12. Electro Aint Electro
13. Thief
14. Too Late To Be Afraid
