= Tiny Monroe =

- Origin: London, United Kingdom
- Genres: Indie pop
- Years active: 1993–1996
- Labels: Laurel
- Past members: Norma Jean "NJ" Wilow; Alex Culpin; Philip Spalding; Greg Sanford; Richard Davies; Jon Solomon

Tiny Monroe were an English indie pop band of the 1990s.

== History ==
The band was formed in London in 1993 by founder members Norma Jean "NJ" Wilow (vocals), Alex Culpin (bass guitar), Philip Spalding (guitar) and Greg Sanford (drums). The line up was cemented when Richard Davies (guitar) and Jon Solomon (drums) replaced Spalding and Sanford. This was the line up that played at Glastonbury, Reading and T in the Park festivals in 1994, and who recorded the majority of the songs on the album 'Volcanoes'. A final line up appeared post recording of the band's only album 'Volcanoes' comprising NJ Wilow (vocals), Richard Davies (guitar), Garry Becker (bass) and Dan Neumann (drums). The band quickly attracted press attention from the NME and Melody Maker. The band emerged as part of a perceived wave of female fronted bands influenced by the new wave sounds of the late 70s and early 80s. Other bands to emerge at the same time included Elastica, Sleeper, Echobelly and Salad.

The band released their debut single "VHF855V" (the title coming from the number plate of NJ's Ford Escort) on the Laurel record label (run by Howard Gough, Manager of Lush) in March 1994, and released their first album Volcanoes in July 1996. Their most successful release, the Cream EP reached number 7 in the national indie chart in April 1994, and number 100 in the UK Singles Chart.

Early support tours with Cranes and Curve were followed by festival appearances at Glastonbury, Reading and T In The Park in 1994. Other festival appearances included Sweden's Hultsfred Festival and France's RouteRock festival in St. Malo. The band undertook several headline tours and supported the Pretenders, Suede and Radiohead at the invitation of all three groups.

While in the band, NJ played the role of an alien in the BBC television film The Traveller.

== Later Careers ==
Wilow self released three albums, available at the time as CDs & downloads: 'Indian Ocean' (2004), 'Goodbye Rock n Roll' (2005) and 'The Cyber Cafe' (2006)

Davies and Culpin both went on to become members of "The Snakes", a UK based alt country band championed by Bob Harris. Active from 2002, releasing albums on the Holiday Disaster, Red Eye and Bucketfull of Brains labels.

In 2020 Davies released his debut solo record, "Human Traffic", as "Richard Davies and the Dissidents" on Bucketfull of Brains. Followed in 2025 by "High Times & Misdemeanours" on Gare du Nord.

Since 2022 Davies has played lead guitar in Wicked Cool recording artist, Marc Valentine's band. Touring and contributing to the albums "Future Obscure" (2022) and "Basement Sparks" (2024)

== Discography ==
=== Album ===
Volcanoes LP (1996), Laurel

1. "She"
2. "Cream Bun"
3. "Love Of the bottle"
4. "Open Invitation"
5. "Snake In The Grass"
6. "VHF 855V"
7. "Brittle Bones"
8. "Secret Place"
9. "Skin Beach"
10. "Women In Love"
11. "Bubble"

=== Singles ===
- "VHF 855V" (1994), Laurel
- Cream EP (1. Cream Bun 2. Jealousy 3. Brittle Bones 4. Sonic Blue) (1994), Laurel
- "She" (1. She 2. The Party's Over 3. Really Happy) (1996), Laurel
- "Open Invitation" (1. Open Invitation 2. Another Station 3. Mirror) (1996), Laurel
