= Glastonbury Festival 2004 =

Music festival in England

- Locations: Worthy Farm, Pilton, Somerset, England
- Previous event: Glastonbury Festival 2003
- Next event: Glastonbury Festival 2005

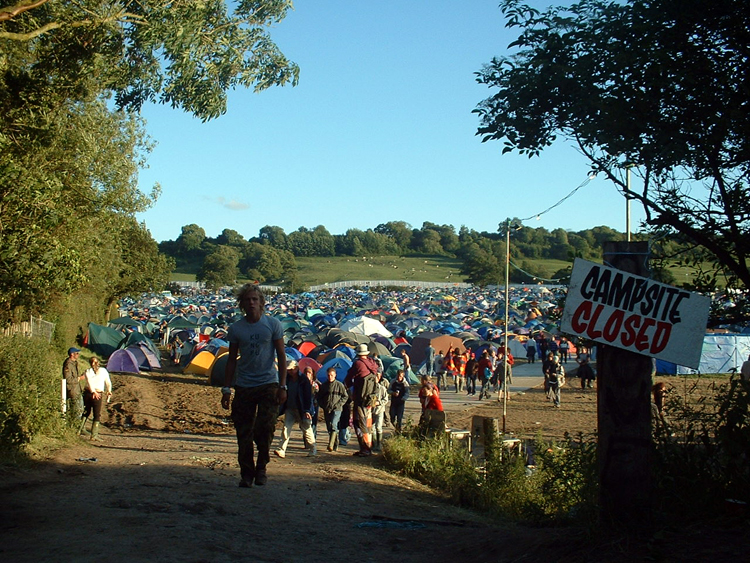
Pennard Hill, 2004

For the Glastonbury Festival of Contemporary Performing Arts 2004, tickets sold out within 24 hours amid much controversy over the ticket ordering process, which left potential festival goers trying for hours to connect to the overloaded telephone and internet sites. The website got two million attempted connections within the first five minutes of the tickets going on sale and an average of 2,500 people on the phone lines every minute.

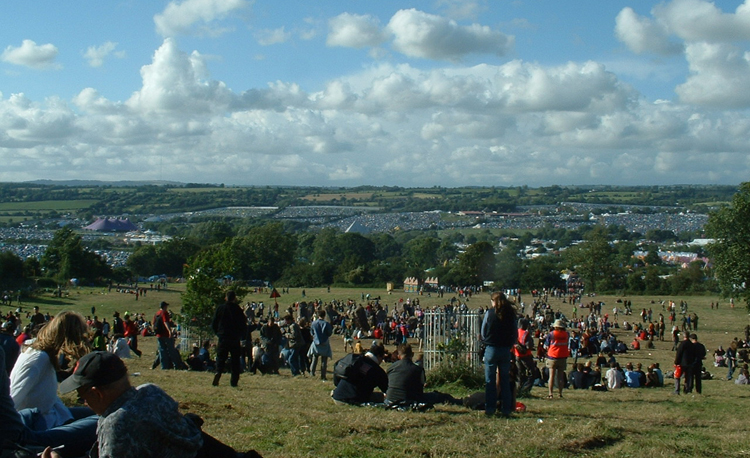
The view from the stone circle on Thursday afternoon, 2004

The festival was not hit by extreme weather, but high winds on the Wednesday delayed entry, and steady rain throughout Saturday turned some areas of the site to mud. The festival ended with Muse headlining the Pyramid Stage on Sunday, after Oasis had headlined on Friday. Franz Ferdinand and Sir Paul McCartney also performed.

== Fallow year announcement ==
After the 2004 festival, Michael Eavis commented that 2006 would be a year off – in keeping with the previous history of taking one "fallow year" in every five to give the villagers and surrounding areas a rest from the yearly disruption. This was confirmed after the licence for 2005 was granted.

== Drug usage ==
In the British press publications appeared about the use of psychedelic drugs by festival visitors. The magazine NME pronounced that 2004 would be "the third summer of love" due to the resurgence of the "shroom" that was praised as a natural alternative to ecstasy, which was said to be declining in popularity (LSD fuelled the first summer of love in 1967; ecstasy and LSD the second in 1988).

== Pyramid stage ==
Friday	Saturday	Sunday
Oasis; Kings of Leon; PJ Harvey; Groove Armada; Elbow; Nelly Furtado; Wilco; Bright Eyes; Ralph Myerz and the Jack Herren Band	Paul McCartney; The Black Eyed Peas; Starsailor; Ben Harper; Lostprophets; Scissor Sisters; Spearhead; Sister Sledge; Taima	Muse; Morrissey; Supergrass (replaced The Libertines); James Brown; Christy Moore; Joss Stone; Dennis Locorriere; English National Opera; Glastonbury Town Band; ENO Rehearsal

== Other stage ==
Friday	Saturday	Sunday
Chemical Brothers; Goldfrapp; Franz Ferdinand; Snow Patrol; Badly Drawn Boy (replaced Jet); The Rapture; I Am Kloot; The Stands; Hal (replaced Billy Talent); Kasabian	Basement Jaxx; Damien Rice; The Von Bondies; British Sea Power; My Morning Jacket; Keane; Simple Kid; 22-20's; The Duke Spirit; Rilo Kiley; The Subways	Orbital; Black Rebel Motorcycle Club; Belle & Sebastian; Gomez; The Eighties Matchbox B-Line Disaster; The Ordinary Boys; Divine Comedy; The Zutons; Razorlight; The Choir

== Dance tent ==
Friday	Saturday	Sunday
Dave Clarke; Kosheen; Fergie; Chicks on Speed; Tim Deluxe; Atomic Hooligan; Mylo; 100% ISIS & Aroma Jockey OD07; The Outlaws; Dark Chunk; DJ Salty; Cakeboy; DJ Miss Minty	Sister Sledge; Fatback Band; DJ Diggz; Scissor Sisters; Soultrain DJs; Soul II Soul Soundsystem; Soultrain DJs; Gwen Dickey's Rose Royce; Soultrain DJs; Earth Wind For Hire; Soultrain DJs; DJ Taylor	Ozomatli; Future World Funk; Goldie Lookin' Chain; Future World Funk (DJ set); Daara J; Future World Funk (DJ set); Ty; Stanton Warriors; The Loose Cannons; DubDadda; Skinnyman & DJ Flip; DJ Parker; Redrama; Plan B

== New tent ==
Friday	Saturday	Sunday
Spiritualized; The Bees; Mark Gardener; Electrelane; Minuteman; Chikinki; Concretes; Grand Transmitter; The Walkmen; South; The Experimental Pop Band; Halima; Once Under	Zero 7; Tim Booth; Hope of the States; The Killers; Chikinki; Longview; Carina Round; Marjorie Fair; Dogs Die in Hot Cars; Gisli; Blackbud; The Others	Television; stellastarr*; Delays; The Raveonettes; Ian McNabb; Buck 65; The Open; Ella Guru; Gonga; The Golden Virgins; Fiction Plane; Broken Dolls; James Blunt

== Jazzworld stage ==
Friday	Saturday	Sunday
Michael Franti & Spearhead; Ojos De Brujo; Lucky Dube; Soulive; The Magic Band; Da Lata; Blurt; Spree; Babyhead	Toots & the Maytals; Jamie Cullum; Joss Stone; Antibalas; Amp Fiddler; Asere; The Angel Brothers; Quantic Soul Orchestra; Mosiamo	Roy Ayers; Bonnie Raitt; Amy Winehouse; Mikey Dread; Trio Mocotó; When Worlds Collide; Tinariwen; Fernanda Porto; Taima

== Acoustic stage ==
Friday	Saturday	Sunday
Tindersticks; Love with Arthur Lee; The Kilfenora Ceili Band; Justin Adams & The Wayward Sheiks; Jerry Fish and the Mudbug Club; Taima; Lisa Mills; Paul Armfield & The Four Good Reasons	Hothouse Flowers; The Rutles; Hot Club of Cowtown; The Long Ryders; Josh Rouse; The Sadies; Michael Weston King; Bodixa	Suzanne Vega; Simon Fowler & Oscar Harrison (OCS); John Cooper Clarke; Cara Dillon; Simple Kid; Jerry Fish and the Mudbug Club; Obi; Waking the Witch

== Avalon stage ==
Friday	Saturday	Sunday
The Levellers (acoustic); Lamb; Jelitara Futa; Baghdaddies; Moksha; Blackbud; Tamra; Oi Va Voi	1 Giant Leap; Slovo; Love Grocer; Hazel O'Connor; Show of Hands; Martin Furey; Loonaloop; Matt Sage; Resonators	Adrian Sherwood; Space Ritual; Ging; Six By Seven; Here & Now; Far Cue; Blue States; The Matzos; Astrid Williamson

== The Glade ==
Thursday	Friday	Saturday	Sunday
Alucid Nation; A Man Called Adam; Hybrid; Hyper; Elite Force; Clever Bunny (Live); Tigger; David Jack (Live); Bitesize; Tom Real; Pete Jordan; Scratchy; High Eight; James Gill	London Dust Explosion; Drunk Soul Brother; Freq Nasty (live); Rennie Pilgrem (DJ); Infusion (live); Meat Katie (DJ); Name: (live); Will White (DJ); Future Funk Squad (live); Krafty Kutz; Modeliser (live); Nick Warren (DJ); LP (live); Capoeira Twins (DJ); Acarine (live)	Flat-E; Bonobo; Plaid (live / DJ); Squarepusher (live); DJ AFX; DJD (DJ); The Egg (live); James Holden; DimnD & Juan Thyme (live); Ned; Toob (live); Matt Herbert; Patthan; Clever Bunny (live); XAN	System 7; Tristan; Eat Static; Eskimo; Ans; Protoculture; Hyrophonic; James Monroe; Hallucinogen in Dub; Grantlee
