= Glastonbury Festival 2007 =

Music festival in England

- Locations: Worthy Farm, Pilton, Somerset, England
- Previous event: Glastonbury Festival 2005
- Next event: Glastonbury Festival 2008

Glastonbury Festival of Contemporary Performing Arts 2007 (20–24 June) was headlined by Arctic Monkeys, The Killers, and The Who on Friday, Saturday and Sunday, respectively. Dame Shirley Bassey was also featured.

== Tickets and attendance ==
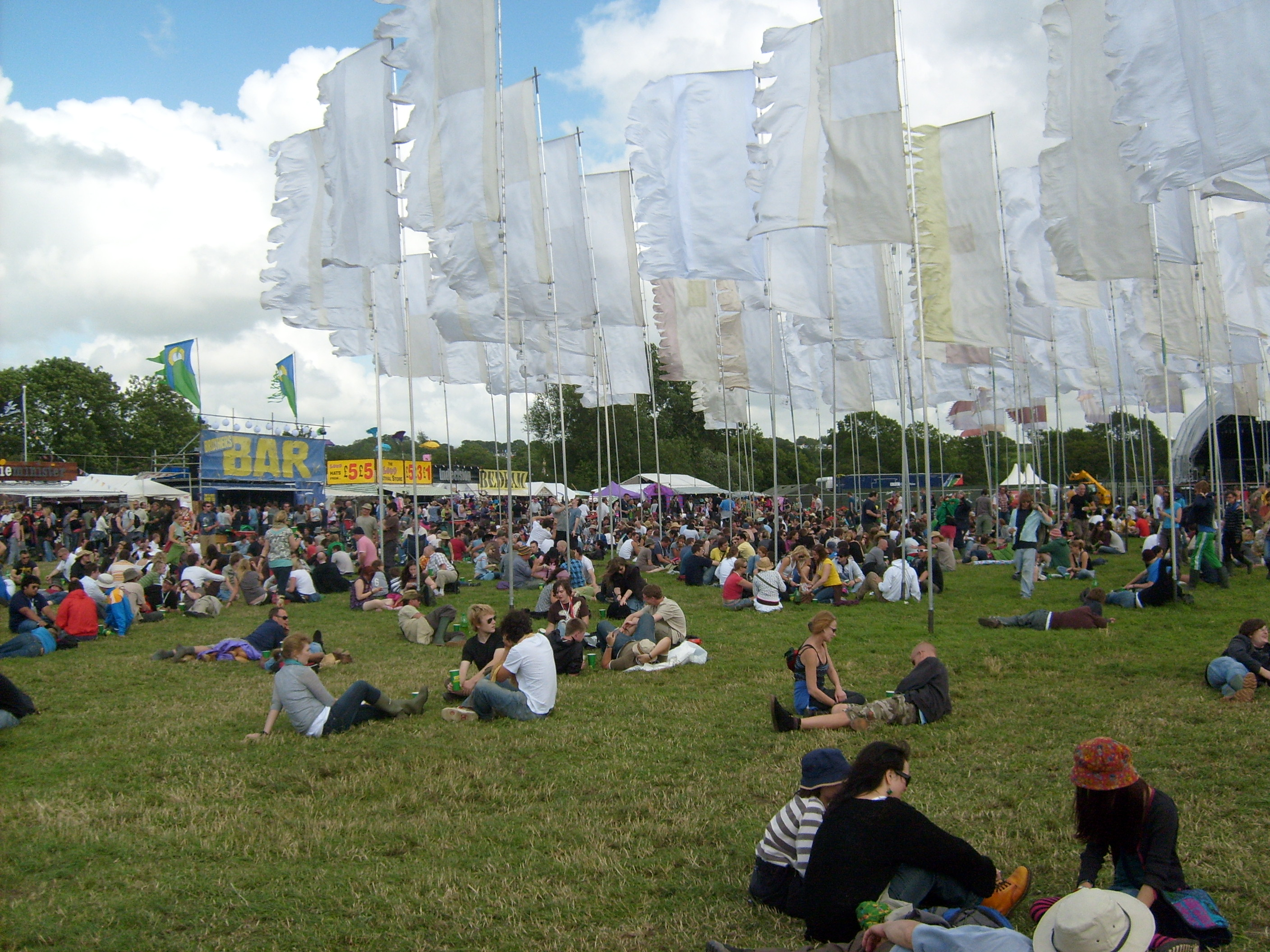
Jazz World field on the opening afternoon of the 2007 festival

In 2007, over 700 acts played on more than 80 stages and the capacity expanded by 20,000 to 177,000. The festival had the largest attendance since the construction of the security fence, and the largest legitimate attendance to date: ticket allocation was raised by 27,500 to 137,500, which were charged at £145 and sold out in 1 hour 45 minutes. As an extra precaution against touts (scalpers), purchasers had to pre-register, including submission of a passport photo which was security printed into the ticket.

Reported crime was down from 2005 but the number of arrests were "well up", after a proactive operation of the police and security on site. There were 236 reported crimes, down from 267 in 2005; of these, 158 were drug related (183 in 2005). 1,200 people required medical aid with 32 hospitalised, most of which were accidents caused by the mud. There was one fatality: a West Midlands man found unconscious early on the Saturday morning died in Yeovil District Hospital of a suspected drugs overdose.

== Weather and traffic issues ==
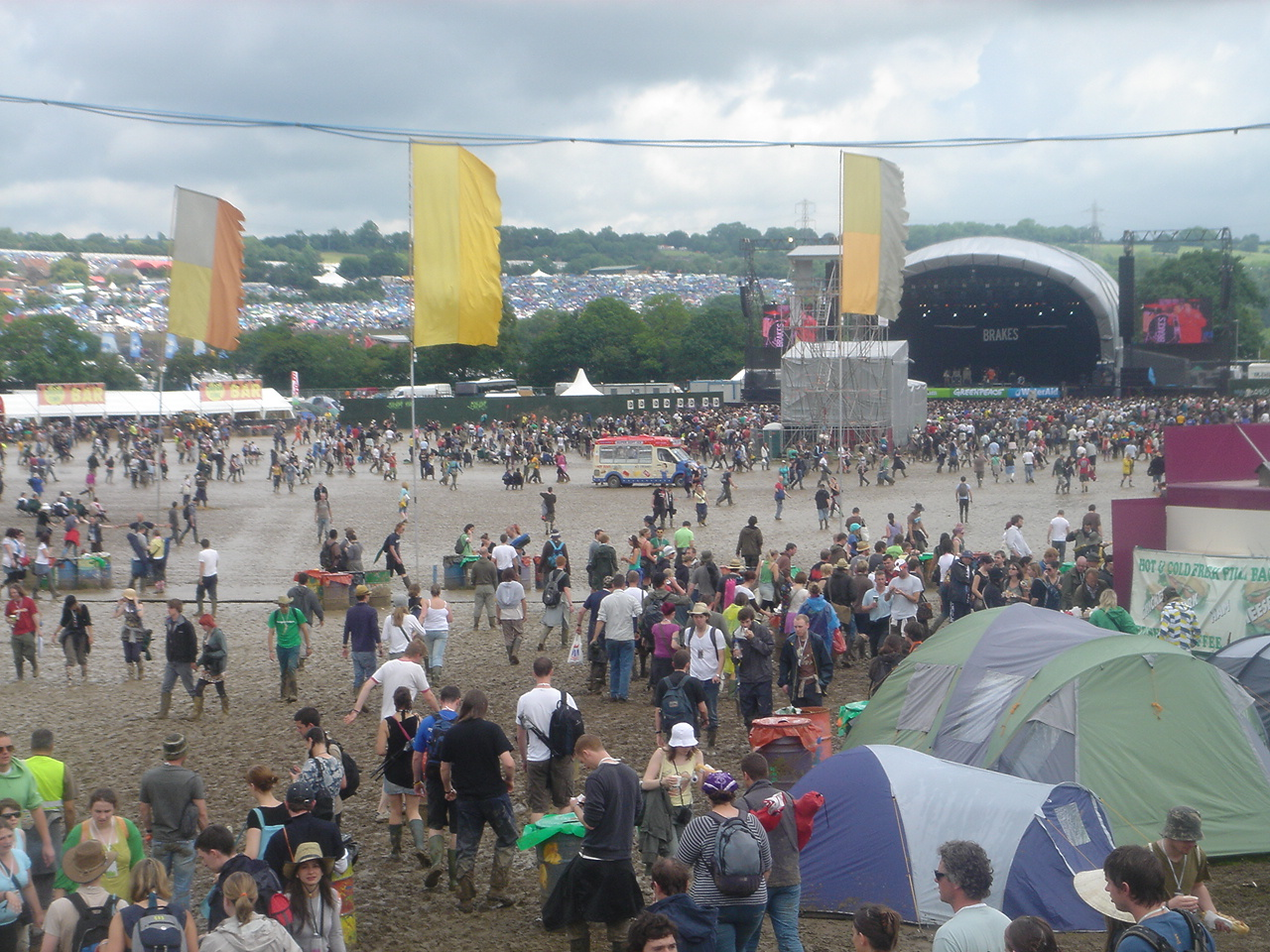
Mud at the "Other Stage" 2007

Continued periods of rain throughout much of the festival caused muddy conditions, though without the flooding of 2005, in part due to the new £750,000 flood defences. However, this constant rain made the general conditions within the site worse than 2 years before and more like the mud plains of 1998. It was difficult to find anywhere to sit down that had not turned to mud and key choke points, such as the thoroughfare at the front right of the Pyramid Stage, turned into a quagmire. Muddy conditions on the temporary roads on the periphery of the site led to delays for people leaving the site.

On 25 June, when the vast majority of festival goers were attempting to leave the festival, cars in the western car parks took more than nine hours to exit the site. There was no stewarding provision in these areas, no information was disseminated regarding the delays, no organised marshalling of traffic was undertaken by the festival organisers, and no provision of drinking water was made to people stranded in their vehicles. Verbal and physical violence was witnessed between festival goers. When cars were finally allowed to leave the site the surrounding roads were found to be clear.

== New features ==
This was the first year that "The Park" area opened. Designed by Emily Eavis, its main stage featured extra sets by several artists playing on the main stages including Spinal Tap, Pete Doherty and Gruff Rhys, whilst the BBC launched their new "Introducing" stage in the area.

== Pyramid stage ==
Friday	Saturday	Sunday
Arctic Monkeys; Kasabian; The Fratellis; Bloc Party; The Magic Numbers; Amy Winehouse; Gogol Bordello; The Earlies; The View; Adjágas	The Killers; The Kooks; Paul Weller; Paolo Nutini; Lily Allen; Dirty Pretty Things; Guillemots; The Pipettes; Seasick Steve; Liz Green	The Who; Kaiser Chiefs; Manic Street Preachers; Dame Shirley Bassey; James Morrison; The Marley Brothers present the 30th anniversary of Exodus; The Waterboys; Corb Lund; National Youth Orchestra

== Other stage ==
Friday	Saturday	Sunday
Björk; Arcade Fire; Rufus Wainwright; The Coral; Super Furry Animals; Bright Eyes; The Automatic; Modest Mouse; The Cribs; Reverend and the Makers; Mr Hudson & The Library	Iggy & The Stooges; Editors; Maxïmo Park; Babyshambles; Klaxons; CSS; Biffy Clyro; The Long Blondes; Brakes; El Presidente; Switches	The Chemical Brothers; The View; The Go! Team; Mika; The Rakes; Get Cape, Wear Cape, Fly; Cold War Kids; The Sunshine Underground; The Enemy; The Holloways; Kharma 45

== John Peel stage ==
Friday	Saturday	Sunday
Hot Chip; The Maccabees; Mumm-Ra; Jack Penate; The Hold Steady; The New Pornographers; Tokyo Police Club; Good Shoes; The Annuals; Disco Ensemble; Fear of Music; Look See Proof	The Twang; Get Cape, Wear Cape, Fly; Patrick Wolf; Bat for Lashes; The Pigeon Detectives; Calvin Harris; You Say Party! We Say Die!; Holy Fuck; The Rushes; The Hours; Grim Northern Social; Blue Bullet	The Gossip; Jamie T; Just Jack; Mark Ronson; Scott Matthews; The Young Knives; The Rumble Strips; The Horrors; The Noisettes; Tiny Dancers; Aqualung; Shoot the Moon

== Jazzworld stage ==
Friday	Saturday	Sunday
Damian "Junior Gong" Marley; Amy Winehouse; Toumani Diabaté's Symmetric Orchestra; AIM; GusGus; Nasio Fontaine; Soweto Kinch; MIDIval Punditz featuring Karsh Kale and special guests; Guilty Pleasures featuring The Tor Dogs and special guests	Rodrigo y Gabriela; John Fogerty; Guillemots; Mr Hudson & The Library; K'Naan; Hiromi's Sonicbloom; The Bees; Soil & "Pimp" Sessions; Ganga Giri; Forty Thieves Orkestar	Corinne Bailey Rae; Fat Freddy’s Drop; Amp Fiddler; Beirut; Tinariwen; Seth Lakeman; Koop; Mahala Rai Banda; Babyhead; Feluka

== Acoustic stage ==
Friday	Saturday	Sunday
Damien Rice; Hothouse Flowers; Sandi Thom; Jack L; Lisa Hannigan; The Dylan Project; Pauline Scanlon; Emmy The Great; Newton Faulkner; Martha Tilston	The Waterboys; Nick Lowe; Eric Bibb; The Men They Couldn't Hang; Liam Ó Maonlaí; The Storys; Catherine Feeny; Liz Green; Hayley Hutchinson	The Bootleg Beatles; KT Tunstall; Moya Brennan; LCG Choir; Steve Forbert; Songs of Nick Drake performed by Keith James; David Saw; The Winding Stair; Hummingbird; The Epstein

== Dance village ==
Stage	Friday	Saturday	Sunday
East Coast Stage	Fatboy Slim; Klaxons; GusGus; Simian Mobile Disco; Max Sedgley; Hyper; Thomas Gandey; !!!; Buraka Som Sistema; Uncle Buck; XX Teens (formerly Xerox Teens)	Mr Scruff; Mika; Mark Ronson; DJ Yoda; Sugadaddy; Infadels; Tim Deluxe; The Black Ghosts; Phil Kieran; Devil’s Gun	Carl Cox; Pendulum; Dave Clarke; Vitalic; The Glimmers; Shitdisco; Kissy Sell Out; Elektrons; Zero dB; Dragonette; Polichinelle
West Coast Stage	Trentemøller live; Danny Howells; System 7; Surgeon AV Show; Eat Static; Jim Masters; A Guy Called Gerald; James Gill; Ralph Myerz and The Jack Herren Band; Alloy Mental; Subgiant; Kava Kava; Marc Vedo; Plump DJs; Rennie Pilgrem and MC Chickaboo; Adam Freeland; General Midi and MC Jakes; D. Ramirez; Dumb Blonde; Tom Real Vs The Rogue Element; Quest; Atomic Hooligan and Jay Cunning; The Breakfastaz; Ben & Lex; Plaza De Funk	Sasha; Hybrid; Mr C; Meat Katie and VJ Anyone; Überzone; DJ Hal; The Bays; Will Saul; Neville Staple Band; Pama International; Kenji Williams; Breakfast with Howard Marks	Krafty Kuts; Coldcut; Steve Lawler; Dreadzone; Bitesize; Crazy P; Stanton Warriors; Phil Hartnoll presents Long Range; Future Funk Squad; DJ Monkey Pilot; The Whip; DJ Monkey Pilot

== Avalon stage ==
Friday	Saturday	Sunday
Mike Scott and Steve Wickham / The Waterboys; The Cat Empire; Show of Hands; Oi Va Voi; Chumbawamba (acoustic set); Ben Waters Band; Flipron; Tarantism	The Saw Doctors; Seth Lakeman; Gruff Rhys; Julie Fowlis; The Broken Family Band; Robin and Bena Williamson; 3 Daft Monkeys; Big Strides; Sheelanagig	Bellowhead; Kíla; Corb Lund and the Hurtin' Albertans; Rise Kagona and Champion Doug Veitch; Billy Bragg; Tunng; Jeff Lang; Emily Barker and the Red Clay Halo; Avalonian Free State Choir

== Orange Tent ==
Friday	Saturday	Sunday
Tiny Dancers; Fear of Music; Mumm-Ra (acoustic set); Dragonette; Mr Hudson (acoustic set); Amy Macdonald (acoustic set)	Mr Scruff (DJ set); Clocks; Just Jack; Peter and the Wolf; Josh Pyke (acoustic set)	Mr Scruff (DJ set); The Hours; The Rumble Strips (acoustic set); The Rushes (acoustic set)
