= Nu skool breaks =

Subgenre of breakbeat

- Stylistic origins: Breakbeat; breakbeat hardcore; electro; drum and bass; UK garage
- Cultural origins: Late 1990s, UK

Nu skool breaks or nu breaks is a subgenre of breakbeat originating during the period between 1998 and 2002. The style is usually characterized by more abstract, more technical sounds, sometimes incorporated from other genres of electronic dance music, including UK garage, electro, and drum and bass. Typically, tracks ranged between 125 and 140 beats per minute (bpm), often featuring a dominant bass line. In contrast with big beat, another subgenre of breakbeat, the sound set consisted less of hip hop samples and acid-type sounds, instead emphasizing dance-friendliness and "new" sounds produced by modern production techniques using synthesizers, effect processors, and computers.

== Origins ==
The term "nu skool breaks" is widely attributed to Rennie Pilgrem and Adam Freeland, who used it to describe the sound at their nightclub Friction, which was launched at Bar Rumba in 1996, with promoter Ian Williams.

The tracks "Renegades" by Uptown Connection and "Double Impact" by Boundarie Hunters are considered to be the earliest produced to formally adopt the genre.

In 1998, the term "Nu Skool Breaks" was used on two compilations, Nu Skool Breakz, Volume 1 and 2, mixed by Rennie Pilgrem and released through UK-based Kickin Records. The first volume of these was recorded live at the aforementioned London club night Friction.

Labels that featured early Nu Skool Breaks releases included Botchit & Scarper, Fuel Records (UK), Hard Hands, Marine Parade Records, TCR, and Ultimatum Breaks.

== Artists ==
- Adam Freeland
- Aquasky
- BLIM
- Dylan Rhymes
- Buckfunk 3000
- Evil Nine
- FatBassLines
- Freq Nasty
- Future Funk Squad
- General Midi
- Hexadecimal
- Hybrid
- Hyper
- Ils
- Koma and Bones
- Lee Coombs
- Meat Katie
- Nubreed
- Plump DJs
- Rennie Pilgrem
- Stanton Warriors
- Tipper
