= Next Life (song) =

2002 single by Meat Katie featuring Ithaka

- "Next Life" 12" vinyl

Single by Meat Katie ft. Ithaka
- Released: 13 January 2002
- Genre: Tech house; Breakbeat; Tech-funk
- Length: 6:52 (Original mix); 8:00 (Elite Force Remix); 7:36 (Phil Kieran Remix); 5:13 (Buddha Bowl original)
- Label: Kingsize (UK)
- Songwriters: Mark Pember; Ithaka Darin Pappas
- Producer: Mark Pember

Music video
- "Next Life" on YouTube

"Next Life" is a 2002 breakbeat, tech-funk song sonically created by Breakspoll Award-winning South London electronic music producer Meat Katie (also known as Mark Pember) and features poetry and vocals by Greek-American artist Ithaka (or Ithaka Darin Pappas).

== Release and chart positions ==
"Next Life" was released in early 2002 by British label Kingsize Music, (owned by Julian Shay). On 30 March 2002, the song debuted on the UK Dance Singles chart at #30, peaking in the #28 position the following week. On the mainstream UK Singles chart during the same week, "Next Life" peaked at #126.

== Reception ==
In a 2024 retrospective article about Meat Katie's career, Audio Lover magazine described him as a true icon and stated, "Next Life" showed a maturation in his production techniques.

In 2026, music journalist Alexandros Plios said of Meat Katie's "Next Life featuring Ithaka as, A proper classic from the golden era of UK breakbeat and tech-funk.

== Remixes ==
- 2002 Next Life (Elite Force Remix by Simon Shackleton)
- 2009 Next Life (Phil Kieran Remix)
- 2016 Next Life (Buddha Bowl original)

== Compilation appearances ==
In 2002, "Next Life" appeared on the compilations "Tribalizm" compiled by Rennie Pilgrem.

In 2005, the song appeared on UNKLE Sounds collection "Essential Music For A Film - Original Motion Picture Soundtrack Reconstruction".

In September 2006 "Next Life" appeared Mo' Wax founder James Lavelle's compilation Global Underground 023: Barcelona mix. The record peaked at #17 on the UK Dance Album charts and at #97 on the UK Compilations chart.

== DJ setlists endorsements (incomplete) ==
- Catalina (15 February 2026) "Goodbyes & friends #2 @ GIMIC - 15 February 2026 Tracklist
- Joe Wink (28 June 2026) Joe Wink's Broken Essence 151 featuring Mista Twist Tracklist
- Gibby (Germany-13 October 2023) @ Kalif Storch AL DENTE 13.10.2023 Tracklist

== Music publishing ==
"Next Life" by Meat Katie featuring Ithaka is published by: BMI, Ravenshark Music, North Music Group, ASCAP and BMG Gold Songs (ISRC#s GBYQF0900061, GBLV62519326)
