= FabricLive.20 =

Compilation album by Joe Ransom
- Released: February 2005
- Genre: Electronic music
- Label: Fabric
- Producer: Joe Ransom

FabricLive chronology
FabricLive.19 (2004)	FabricLive.20 (2005)	FabricLive.21 (2005)

Professional ratings
Review scores
Source	Rating
Tiny Mix Tapes	4/5 stars

FabricLive.20 is a DJ mix compilation album by Joe Ransom, a part of the FabricLive Mix Series.

== Track listing ==
1. Pablo - Turntable Technology - Red Hook Recordings
2. Keith Lawrence And Seanie-T - Muzik-Ed Special - Muzik-Ed Productions
3. Rodney P - The Nice Up - Low Life/Riddim Killa
4. Ty - So U Want More? (Refix) Ft Roots Manuva - Big Dada Recordings
5. Evil Ed Ft Yungun - Nico Suave - Janomi Records
6. Ali B presents Plan B - No New Styles - Air Recordings
7. Luv Lite Massive - Bun De Wikkid (Pressure Drop Bassbeat Version) - One Eye Records
8. M.I.A. - Galang - XL Recordings
9. The Nextmen Ft Dynamite MC - High Score (Stanton Warriors Remix) - Scenario Records
10. Cane Motto - Ain't Nuttin To It (Part Two) - One Eye Records
11. Dizzee Rascal - Stand Up Tall - XL Recordings
12. 5th Suite - Una Funker - Functional Breaks
13. Rennie Pilgrem - Coming Up For Air Ft Sara Whittaker-Gilbey (Koma & Bones Remix) - TCR
14. Tayo Meets Precision Cuts Downtown - Breakbeat Girl - F.U.N Recordings
15. Shut Up And Dance - Reclaim The Streets (Move Ya! And Steve Lavers Remix) - Shut Up And Dance
16. Zinc - Go DJ (Remix) - Bingo Beats
17. Dynamite MC - Industry - Strong Records
