= John Chiti =

Zambian musician

- Born: John Muzuni Chiti; 24 February 1985 (age 41); Ndola, Copperbelt Province, Zambia
- Genres: World Music, Pop Music
- Occupations: Singer, songwriter, guitarist, musician
- Years active: 2008–present
- Label: Digital Jukebox Records
- Website: johnchiti.com

John Muzuni Chiti (born 24 February 1985) is a Zambian guitarist, singer and songwriter. He was born with albinism, a congenital condition of having no pigment in the skin or hair, which appear white.

== Early life and education ==
Chiti is the eldest of six children. At birth, his parents didn't understand how they could have given birth to a white child and he was immediately abandoned by his father at birth who blamed his mother for his condition and thought she may have had an affair with a white man.

In areas of Africa, the body parts of people with albinism are believed to have powers, to make wealth, to cure diseases which has led to the persecution of people with albinism.

Chiti's music became an outlet for his feelings and frustrations.

=== Biographical film ===
In 2021, he was contacted by a Zambian film maker Lawrence Thompson who heard about Chiti and wanted to make a feature film about his life with film director Kenny Mumba. Netflix bought the movie late 2022. The movie Can You See Us? was an instant success when it was released on 27 August 2023. He was played by the female actress Thabo Kaamba as a child and George Sikazwe as a young man. He navigated a childhood of ‘bullying, tragedy and cautious hope’.

=== Music ===
In October 2023, he agreed and signed with UK music executive Mark Duffus owner of Digital Jukebox Records where some songs and albums were released under the Digital_Jukebox_Records label.

== Humanitarian work ==
In 2008, Chiti founded the Albino Foundation of Zambia and won the 230th Commonwealth Points of Light award, signed by Queen Elizabeth II.

In February 2022, Chiti was appointed as Commissioner for Zambia Police service by the republican president. He was awarded the 2018 Mandela Washington Fellowship and holds various humanitarian awards for his contributions towards disability issues.

=== Today ===
Chiti was recently interviewed by the BBC World Service. Harry Graham, Producer at BBC mentioned, "Growing up with albinism, Zambian singer John Chiti faced a lot of stigma. As a boy, he was bullied, and as an adult he faced barriers to his music career. Eventually, he released his music.

== Filmography ==
- Can You See Us? (2022)
