= Balloon Factory =

Balloon Factory may refer to:

- School of Ballooning, a late 19th-century / early 20th-century British military unit
- The Balloon Factory, a 2006 album by British Electropop band Chikinki
