= From the Sky =

From the Sky may refer to:

- From the Sky (film), a 2014 short film featuring drone strikes
- From the Sky (album), a 2006 album by the British rock band Blackbud
