= Blackbud (album) =

Studio album by Blackbud
- Released: June 8, 2009
- Recorded: The Garden, Miloco and The Strongroom, London
- Genre: Rock
- Length: 41:56
- Label: Independiente
- Producer: Mike Crossey

Blackbud chronology
From the Sky (2006)	Blackbud (2009)

Singles from Blackbud
- 1. "You Can Run" Released: May 31, 2009

Blackbud is the second studio album by Blackbud, released on June 8, 2009 on Independiente Records. It was the band's final release before going on an indefinite hiatus in 2010.

Upon release, drummer Sam Nadel stated that the album:

feels fresh – even a year after finishing it. Sometimes you lose that excitement for your own work within a few days! In a way we’ve regressed, but purposely, so in that we tried to capture the essence of what we are as band. We weren’t going for a “big production” this time around: we used less instruments and were stricter on ourselves, on which ideas made the final cut.

== Track listing ==
1. "Left Your Arms Empty" – 3:21
2. "You Can Run" – 3:36
3. "Wandering Song" – 3:29
4. "Love Comes So Easy" – 4:25
5. "So It Seems" – 4:39
6. "Golden Girl" – 2:05
7. "Road to Nowhere" – 3:49
8. "Came Down Easy" – 3:56
9. "Outside Looking In" – 4:06
10. "I'll Be Here" – 4:11
11. "Darkness" – 4:24

== Personnel ==
- Joe Taylor – vocals, guitars
- Sam Nadel – drums, backing vocals
- Adam Newton – electric and double bass
- Mike Crossey – producer, mixing
- Jules Buckley – string arrangements, orchestrations
- Kat Scheld – violin ("You Can Run")
- Kath James – violin ("You Can Run")
- Amy Wilson – viola ("You Can Run", "Road to Nowhere")
- Ben Trigg – cello ("You Can Run", "Road to Nowhere")
- Jennymay Logan – violin ("Road to Nowhere")
- Martin Lissola – violin ("Road to Nowhere")
- Loz Aldridge – recording assistant
- Lee Slater – recording assistant
- John Davis – mastering
- Mark James – artwork
