= Kickin Records =

Kickin Records is an independent record label founded in 1988 by Peter Harris (who died on 6 January 2008). The record label released music by artists including The Scientist, Shut Up and Dance, Blak Prophetz, Messiah, Grant Nelson, DJ Hype, Phil Asher, Matthew Bushwhack B, Dominic B of the Stanton Warriors and Rennie Pilgrem.

The recording company eventually added the Slip 'n' Slide, Pandemonium Records, Hardleaders, Stoned Asia and Slip 'n' Slide Blue labels, "and also had a publishing arm in the form of Haripa Music Publishing in 1990." Meat Machine and Echobelly were signed to Kickin Records' subsidiary label, Pandemonium Records. Haripa Music was sold to independent music publisher Superb Songs, in 2016; administered by Supreme Songs Limited. Other recording artists included Wishdokta and Zero Zero.
