= Glastonbury Festival 2005 =

Music festival in England

- Locations: Worthy Farm, Pilton, Somerset, England
- Previous event: Glastonbury Festival 2004
- Next event: Glastonbury Festival 2007

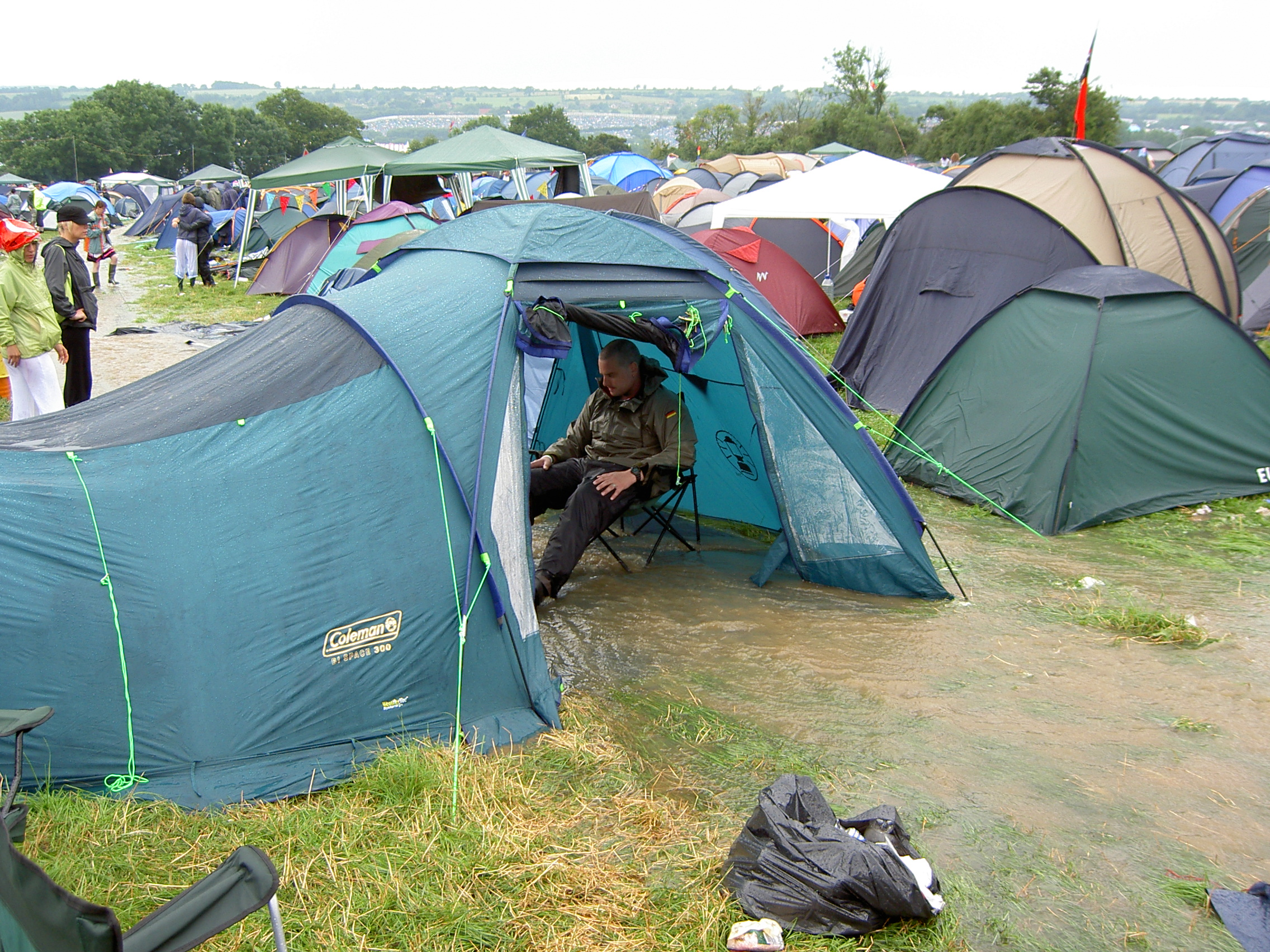
A stream runs through a tent after two inches of rain fell in an hour on Friday morning of the 2005 festival.

For the Glastonbury Festival 2005 the 112,500 ticket quota sold out rapidly – in this case in 3 hours 20 minutes. For 2005, the enclosed area of the festival was over 900 acres (3.6 km^{2}), had over 385 live performances, and was attended by around 150,000 people.

The Sunday headliner was originally scheduled to be Kylie Minogue, but she had to pull out in May after being diagnosed with breast cancer. Basement Jaxx were announced as a replacement on 6 June. Both Coldplay and Basement Jaxx performed a cover of Kylie's "Can't Get You Out Of My Head" during their concert.

There was no festival in 2006. After the 2004 festival, Michael Eavis commented that 2006 would be a year off – in keeping with the previous history of taking one "fallow year" in every five to give the villagers and surrounding areas a rest from the yearly disruption. This was confirmed after the licence for 2005 was granted.

== New features ==
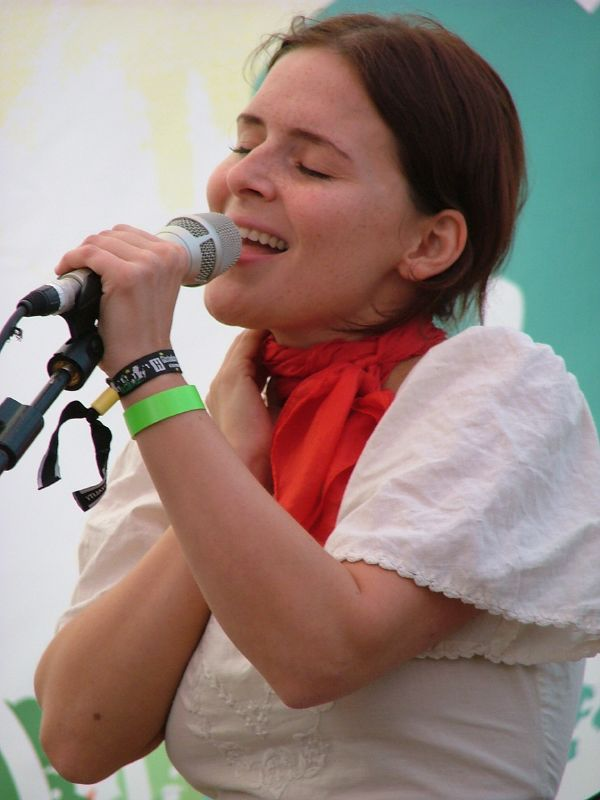
Icelandic singer and songwriter Emilíana Torrini performing in 2005

2005 saw a big increase in the number of dance music attractions, with the multiple tents of the Dance Village replacing the solitary dance tent of previous years. This new area contained the East and West dance tents, the Dance Lounge, Roots Stage, and Pussy Parlour, as well as a relocated G Stage, formerly situated in the Glade. The introduction of the silent disco by festival organiser Emily Eavis allowed revellers to party into the early hours without disturbing the locals – a requirement of the festival's licensing. Following the death of DJ John Peel in the autumn of 2004, the New Tent was renamed the John Peel Tent, in homage to his encouragement and love of new bands at Glastonbury.

== Weather ==
The opening day of the 2005 festival was delayed by heavy rain and thunderstorms: Several stages, including the Acoustic Tent (and one of the bars), were struck by lightning, and the valley was hit with flash floods that left some areas of the site under more than four feet of water. The severity of the weather flooded several campsites, the worst affected being the base of Pennard Hill, and seriously disrupted site services. However, Mendip District Council's review of the festival called it one of the "safest ever" and gives the festival a glowing report in how it dealt with the floods.
