= FabricLive.21 =

Compilation album by Meat Katie
- Released: April 2005
- Genre: Electronic music
- Label: Fabric
- Producer: Meat Katie

Meat Katie chronology
Bedrock Breaks (2004)	FabricLive.21 (2005)	Vibrator (2006)

FabricLive chronology
FabricLive.20 (2005)	FabricLive.21 (2005)	FabricLive.22 (2005)

FabricLive.21 is a DJ mix compilation album by English electronic musician Meat Katie, as part of the FabricLive Mix Series.

== Track listing ==
1. Lee Coombs & David Phillips - Banned Practice - Thrust Recordings
2. Albino Allstars - Can You Hear Me - Tagsta
3. 2 tracks mixed
  1. Ithaka - So Get Up (Acapella) - Kaos Records Portugal
  2. Figures featuring Ithaka - Phat Prick - Kingsize Records
4. Virtualmismo - Mismoplastico (Lee Coombs Back To The Phuture Mix) - Expanded Music
5. Tim Wright - Oxygen (Abe Duque Remix) - Mute
6. Meat Katie & Elite Force - Nu-Tron - Kingsize Records
7. 2 tracks mixed
  1. Unkle Ft. Ian Brown - Reign (Acapella) - Global Underground
  2. Infusion - Better World (Infusion Remix) - BMG
8. Jem Stone & J.C. - Disco Daze - Finger Lickin' Records
9. Elite Force - Shadow Box - Kingsize Records
10. Metric - Stale - Lot 49
11. Force Mass Motion - Out Of it - Lot 49
12. Vigi & Nectarios - 2 C Beat (EK Remix) - Streetwise Records
13. Dylan Rhymes - Salty (Meat Katie Remix) - Kingsize Records
14. Koma & Bones - Get Down - Lot 49
15. Vandal - Mad As Hell - Lot 49
16. Circuit Breaker - Gateway - Lot 49
17. Atomic Hooligan Ft. Sweet Hustler - Shine A Light (Introspective Remix) - Botchit & Scarper
