= Digital Jukebox Records =

British record label

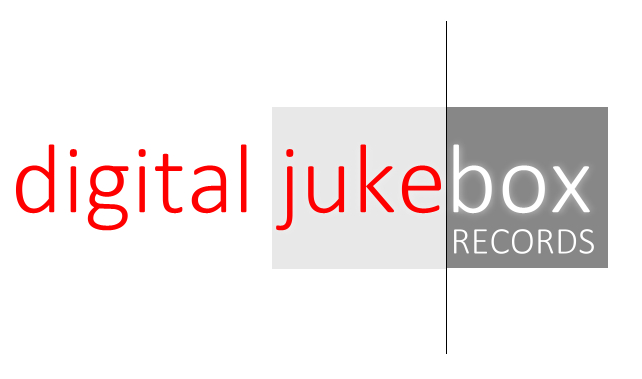
- Parent company: Fatt Jointz Recordings / FJ Entertainment
- Founded: 2007
- Founder: Mark Duffus (Blak Prophetz)
- Distributors: Ioda, Cargo, The Orchard (Sony Music), TRC Distribution
- Genre: Hip hop, soul, reggae, house
- Country of origin: UK, US
- Location: London, United Kingdom
- Official website: Official website

Digital Jukebox Records began as a British hip hop record label under the name of FJ/Fatt Jointz Recordings in the early 1990s which has been an underground source for the success of some recording artists ever since. Label head Mark Duffus had very close musical links with many prominent East Coast / New York record producers and musicians.

== History ==
Fatt Jointz or FJ Entertainment's name was changed to Digital Jukebox later on in 2007 under a complete rebrand when BBC Publishing (under BBC Worldwide) became their publishing partners and the music genres of the label's artists became more diverse. The first official global song release under FJ was "With Fx" which was produced by Mark Duffus (a.k.a. Sure Shot / Blak Prophetz). Over the years, the label had worked with several notable recording artists such as Ced Gee of Ultramagnetic MCs (who featured on the Blak Prophetz album The 2nd Coming), Fonda Rae, Joyce Sims, Yvonne Curtis and Funk Division, among others.

=== Documentary ===
In 2020, the label was involved in a new documentary about the life and career of Yvonne Curtis as mentioned in the Jamaica Gleaner and Future Topic Magazine, due for release sometime in the near future.

== 2021-present ==
In 2021, the label expressed an interest in children's stories and took on board a selected team voice over experts including Mark Anthony, Blak Prophetz who was the voice behind the successful children's game by Hasbro called Crazy Cash Machine and his daughter Alicia Duffus who contributes in script writing. The first recording was released on 24 December 2020 entitled 'No Competition' via Sony Music distribution, The Orchard (company) and was recently reviewed by Mkuu Amani of Toronto Caribbean who said

"The audio-story, which offers a humorous take on a classic tale about an over-confident, fast-running hare, aims to encourage more youngsters to read books and enjoy audio stories. The episode enlists Anthony’s vocal talents, the versatile artist performing all of the character voice overs, including the hare’s role, a character with a distinctly Caribbean personality."

In 2022, Yvonne was featured in Vogue (magazine) for her continuing hard work in Reggae Music since the 1960s, speaking of her life living in Jamaica & London through the past decades for the Black History Month special edition in Vogue. Yvonne is one of the very few original globally recognised female vocalist of the Reggae genre to have been ever selected to be featured in Vogue magazine. She is currently mentored and managed by Mark Duffus (Blak Prophetz), and regularly performs at the nationwide UK Reggae Land festival on a yearly basis where she has been considered to be The hardest working woman in Reggae by Lorna Edwards of Reflector Magazine.

== Artists ==
- D'atra_Hicks - artist/management
- Blak Prophetz - artist/management
- Ced Gee - remix & various productions
- Funk Division - artist/management
- Dee Shy - artist/management
- John Chiti - artist/management
- Fonda Rae - artist/management
- Fuzz Jaxx (Fuzz Jackson) - artist/management
- Joyce Sims - remix & various productions
- Dawn Penn - agent/management
- Pickney Dem - artist/management
- Yvonne Curtis - artist/management
- Rebee - artist/management
- Loose Ends (band) - artist
- Dexter Wansel - artist
- Karlos Edwards - artist

== See also ==
- List of record labels
- List of independent UK record labels
- List of electronic music record labels
