= Blak Prophetz =

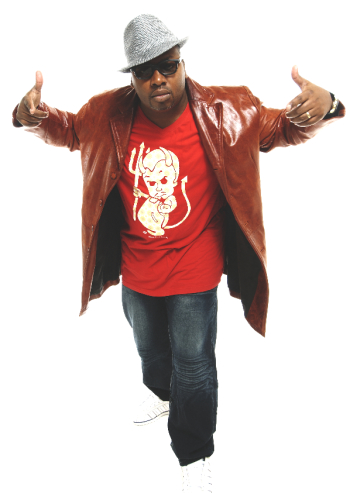

Background information
- Also known as: Blak Prophetz, Audio Kingz, Sure Shot
- Born: Mark Anthony Duffus; Walsall, England
- Genres: Hip hop
- Occupations: Record producer, rapper
- Instruments: Drums, vocals
- Years active: 1979–present
- Labels: Kold Sweat, Digital Jukebox, Demon
- Website: www.blakprophetz.com

Mark Duffus, better known as Blak Prophetz, is a British rapper and producer from the West Midlands in England where he formed the group also known as Blak Prophetz, in the early 1980s.

== History ==
Since 1979, Duffus has been a rapper, songwriter, record producer, drummer and DJ whose inspiration came from his father, who was also a DJ from Jamaica. Other tracks by Duffus under a different name, the Audio Kingz, appear on an album titled The Wheel Project released by Ruff N Ready Records in 1990. The initial song was named "The Sure Shot Dope Tracks Pt 1".

=== Early 1990s ===
Blak Prophetz' first known track was called "Fax on Wax" which was released by the London record label Kickin Records, now considered rare and has fetched up to £30 in auctions.

During the song's verses, Duffus made references to early rap groups like the Sugarhill Gang and Cold Crush Brothers. It achieved a number 9 in the UK Echo's Jazz Chart which was compiled by Steve Chandler in the 18th May edition of Echoes magazine in 1991. John Mayor, a contributing writer for Mixmag, described the song as a "cool jazz attack for Ladbroke Grove's pavement posse."

John Slater, a reviewer for Hip Hop Connection magazine researched Duffus's past and during the review he touched on how his parents travelled from Jamaica in the '50s and how his father, who was a DJ, inspired his love for making music. Slater also went on to describe how Duffus was regularly tasked with "humping massive sound systems around" with his father. These would have been large speakers often carried around when his father was doing a show or was involved in a possible sound clash.

He eventually left Kickin Records to sign a new record deal with London's new hip hop record label Kold Sweat Records based in Ladbroke Grove. Kold Sweat was run by Tony Powell who was also the managing director of Pinnacle Entertainment and was home to some of the UK's prime hip hop acts of that era including the Son of Noise. Their new single titled "Chapter One" was recorded in 1992 and shortly after this release, Duffus decided to relocate to London to pursue his musical career.

Kenny Grogan, another writer for Mixmag, featured the new song in the April edition awarding the song a 4 out of 5 rating. With an ending remark "mooody", Grogan expressed his acknowledgement of the decreasing hip hop vinyl saying "homegrown hip hop is hard to find". He praised the existence of the song and went on to say: "It should help the rest of the world of decreasing hip hop vinyl".

=== Mid-1990s ===
Whilst Blak Prophetz was working on new material, Kold Sweat decided to close their doors for business for good but this did not stop Duffus from pursuing his career. In 1998, he decided to release a new single via his own production outfit called 'Fatt Jointz' or 'FJ Entertainment' called "Money & Guns" which caught the attention of well known DJs including Tim Westwood of BBC Radio 1. Westwood included the single in his favorite 'Top 10 Flava's Singles', describing the Prophetz as "old skool survivors" and praised Duffus's reshuffle of the group and previous relocation to London.

A new article by a reporter called Tee Max from Echoes magazine focused on Duffus's new life in London, his settling into the London life and becoming a father for the first time. "Money and Gunz" grew popular in his hometown back in the Midlands as Max would continuously make reference to the fact that it was a favourite on Birmingham's Choice FM DJ One Step Ahead show. Duffus's extensive record collection would often pop up during the discussion as his huge vinyl stack was the backdrop of the interview photo but he was secretive about which samples he used.

In November that same year, a writer named Mike Lewis of Hip Hop Connection drew on a more serious issue which was affecting British hip hop acts throughout the UK during that period. Lewis knew that many UK acts were finding it almost impossible to gain recognition overseas and that UK hip hop was somewhat struggling for exposure. It was a touchy subject that was not usually openly discussed in the media by UK rap artists but during the interview the Prophetz were not afraid to speak openly about this issue.

=== Collaborations ===
During 2003, Blak Prophetz was somewhat put on hold for a short period so that Duffus could complete other projects with other musicians like the remix project for Kwame Kwaten of D-Influence and Warren Stacey who was managed by Kwaten at that time. He requested Duffus's production skills on a duet track called "Hot for You" which featured Stacey and was released on Brownsugar Records, distributed by Avex Group, Japan. It was called "The WS Project" located on an album called Soul Essentials Vol. 6, released by Avex.

=== Mid-2000s ===
Blak Prophetz were back releasing a 12-inch called "With FX", from their album that year entitled 2nd Coming. It was released in New York and distributed through TRC Distribution, in Los Angeles on vinyl and was a feature in the Blues & Soul magazine by writer Ryan Proctor during October 2005.

During that same period came the cross-collaboration release of the 2nd Coming album which included other rap artists. The album attracted some negative critical attention from Tadah of UrbanSmarts.com magazine who declared:

"As we start with talking about the lyrics, let's end with talking about the lyrics. The potential of what the Blak Prophetz really can do appears on "Still a Kid". This struggle-and-strives tale was done shockingly real and is a hundred times better than the tried and tired battle rhymes on here. Even though the level of the braggadocio only reflects the down earth rap music this is. This is nothing fancy or flashy, but some gritty, grassroots type traditional rap music. Good as such, but in no way spectacular."

Despite lacking positive critical attention from Tadah, the track from the album titled "What Is Rap" was selected by Bartle Bogle Hegarty whose client Mentos chose to use for the global Mentos Fruity 3 High Rider advert campaign.

It also caught the attention of Notion Magazine also known as Notionmag. Notion's writer, Loriann Luckings conducted an insight into the group's progression focusing on how they had travelled and pushed their way through the ranks saying;

"The lads went to the big smoke in 1996 to distribute, sell and promote themselves and their music. They soon got signed to record label Kold Sweat Records and formed as the Blak Prophetz. Sure Shot is regarded highly for his remixing and production skills, having worked with artists including the likes of Justin Timberlake and Jason Jermaine. He is what is known commonly as the background guy – the one who does a lot of the hard work and takes very little commercial credit."

== Critical reception ==
During an interview in the 1 August 1991 edition of Hip Hop Connection, Slater asked Blak Prophetz what they thought of the new emerging success of the US rap group Public Enemy. A response came from a temporary member at that time namely Willie B who responded stating that "Public Enemy stayed where the money was" (meaning that PE remained attached to a record label that was run by a white management). Willie applauded Professor Griff's move to Luke Records, which was run by a team of black individuals. The statement outraged Chuck D, the main member of PE, who later responded directly to Willie in issue 34 stressing that there was no black system and that 'Griff' still has to deal with a white ran system.

== 2009–2012 ==
Duffus managed to earn a publishing deal with 2 Entertain which is now controlled by the BBC and Demon Music Group. Since the album, there have been other releases, including "What Is Rap" which was used in the Global TV commercial for Mentos Fruity 3 Gum. Whilst working on the Blak Prophetz next album, he has also been involved in other productions for Joyce Sims under the name of 'The Soul Garden (Funk Division)' (his personal jazz/funk production band). Duffus is also an A&R Consultant for Tune Tribe's new London music consultancy company, Arising Artists.

== 2013–present ==
A politically themed song called "What the F## Pt. 1" was released towards the end of 2013. During that same period, the song became popular and the author and founder of Hip Hop Foundation magazine, Karl Smith, reviewed and praised the song describing it as "slamming", stating: "It touches on issues amongst today's youth."

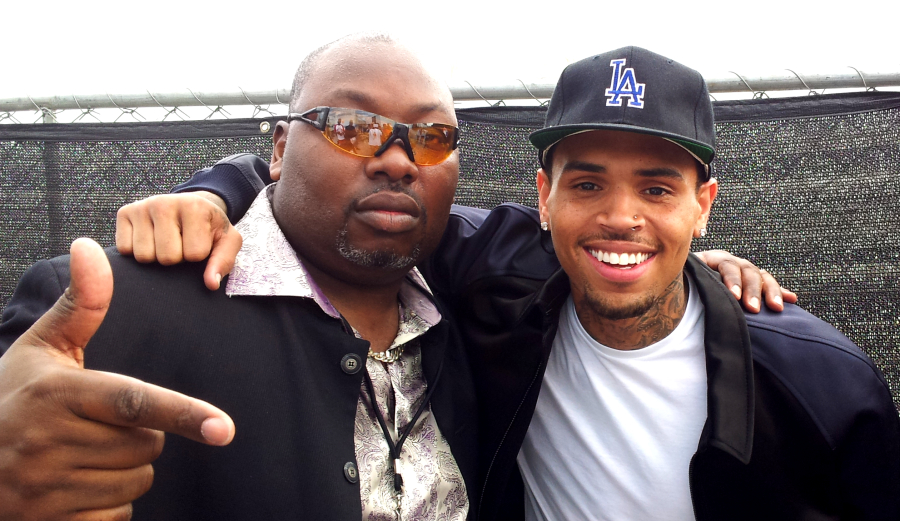
Duffus and Chris Brown - BET Awards, Los Angeles

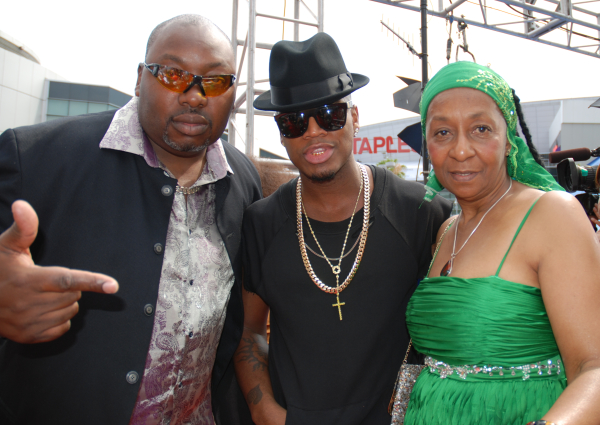
Duffus, Ne-Yo and Dawn Penn on the red carpet at the BET Awards 2013, Los Angeles.

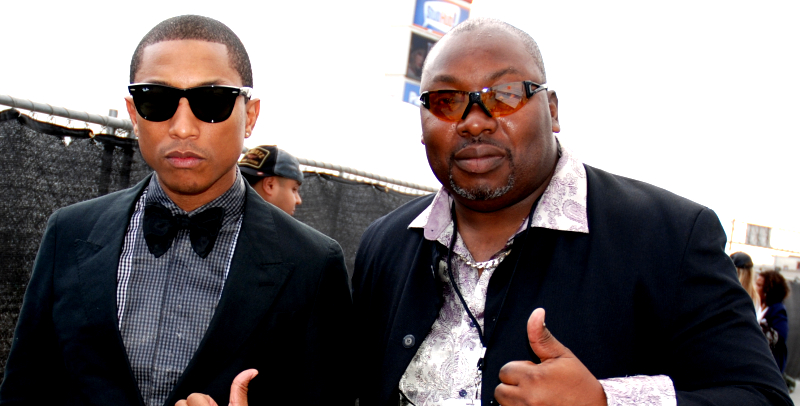
Duffus and Pharrell - BET Awards, Los Angeles

Duffus also runs the record label Digital Jukebox Records where he manages other recording artists such as Yvonne Curtis and also reggae artist Dawn Penn who he attended the BET Awards 2013 ceremony with, after BET Television invited them both as special guests to walk the red carpet along with other A-list celebrities and for a performance which took place at the Nokia Theatre L.A. Live in Los Angeles, California. The event consisted of a "reggae segment" where Penn performed her hit single "You Don't Love Me (No, No, No)" in front of other celebrities including Nicki Minaj, Jamie Foxx, Chris Brown and others. Performing alongside Penn were other international reggae stars including Beenie Man and Chaka Demus & Pliers.

Having previously been involved in voice overs for Hasbro games, Duffus rekindled his interest by getting involved in children's stories and took on board a selected team of voice over experts including his daughter Alicia Duffus who contributes in script writing and released a short story titled No Competition on 24 December 2020 which was reviewed by Mkuu Amani of Toronto Caribbean who said, "The audio-story, which offers a humorous take on a classic tale about an over-confident, fast-running hare, aims to encourage more youngsters to read books and enjoy audio stories. The episode enlists Anthony's vocal talents, the versatile artist performing all of the character voice overs, including the hare's role, a character with a distinctly Caribbean personality."

In March/April 2021, Loose Ends and jazz musician Dexter Wansel was also signed to the label Digital Jukebox Records to release his new album The Story of the Flight Crew to Mars, reviewed by Soul Walking.

In October 2022, recording artist Yvonne Curtis was featured in the "Black History Month" special edition of Vogue magazine where Duffus, her manager, was applauded for his production skills and encouragement towards her career.

== Discography ==
=== Albums ===
- 2005: 2nd Coming (featuring Ced-Gee), Fattjointz
- 2006: Themes Volume One (Actions & Emotions), Digital Jukebox
- 2006: Themes Volume Two (Impact & Adventures), Digital Jukebox
- 2014: Themes Volume Three (Music for TV Adverts), Digital Jukebox
- 2017: Themes Volume Four (The Hip Hop (The 90's), Digital Jukebox

=== Singles ===
- 1991: "Feel the Force (Sure Shot Dope Tracks Pt. 1)" – The Wheel compilation
- 1992: "Fax on Wax", Kickin
- 1992: "Chapter One", Kold Sweat
- 1998: "Money & Gunz", Fatt Jointz
- 2002: "With Fx", Fatt Jointz
- 2006: "What Is Rap", Fatt Jointz/Digital Jukebox
- 2007: "A Time 4u", Fatt Jointz
- 2008: "The Situation", Digital Jukebox
- 2009: "U Gotta Give", Digital Jukebox
- 2010: "How U Like", Digital Jukebox
- 2010: "What Is Rap (featuring Afrika Bambaataa), Digital Jukebox
- 2012: "Closer", Digital Jukebox
- 2013: "What the F## Pt. 1", Digital Jukebox
- 2014: "Butterflies (World Peace)" (featuring Afrika Bambaataa), Digital Jukebox
- 2015: "The Lowdown", Digital Jukebox
- 2016: "With Fx - Re-mastered/Remixed/Live", Fatt Jointz/Digital Jukebox
- 2017: "The Jet Set (A Box Bwoy Story)", Digital Jukebox
- 2024: "Our People", Digital Jukebox

=== Song productions ===
- 2003: "Hot for You" - WS Project featuring Justin Timberlake
- 2012: "Back in Love" - Joyce Sims featuring Afrika Bambaataa
- 2015: "Dreaming" - Joyce Sims (from the album Love Songs)
- 2015: "Want You" - Funk Division, Digital Jukebox
- 2016: "Think About You" - Fonda Rae featuring Blak Prophetz, Digital Jukebox
- 2016: "Tell Me Something" - Funk Division, Digital Jukebox
- 2017: "Got You" - Rebekah Ross featuring Blak Prophetz, Digital Jukebox
- 2017: "Right On" - Funk Division, Digital Jukebox
- 2018: "If You Were Mine" - Funk Division, Digital Jukebox
- 2018: "Search'in" - Blak Prophetz & Fonda Rae, Digital Jukebox
- 2019: "Son of a Preacher Man" - Yvonne Curtis, Digital Jukebox
- 2019: "Things I Said" - Funk Division, Digital Jukebox
- 2020: "Crossroads" - Dee Shy, Digital Jukebox
- 2020: "Everybody's Going Through Something" - Joyce Sims
- 2020: "Love Like That" - Dee Shy, Digital Jukebox
- 2020: "No Competition" - Pickney Dem, Digital Jukebox
- 2021: "Rollin wit' Jesus" - Dee Shy, Digital Jukebox
- 2022: "Witness" - Dee Shy, Digital Jukebox
- 2022: "Symptoms of Love" - Funk Division, Digital Jukebox
- 2024: "Whenever" - Funk Division, Digital Jukebox
- 2024: "Mama Raised" - Dee Shy, Digital Jukebox
