= Meat Machine =

Industrial metal rock band

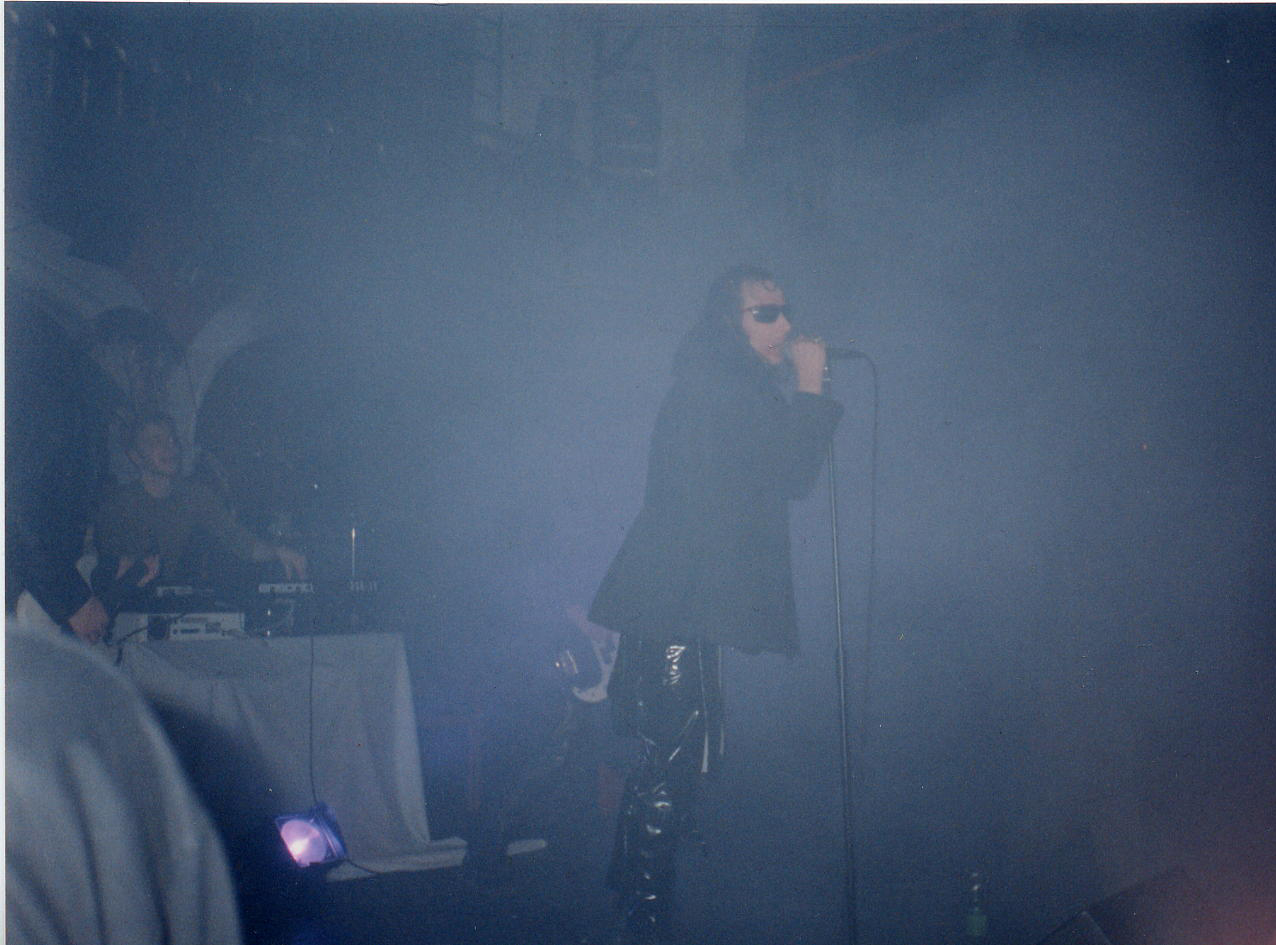
- Meat Machine

Background information
- Genres: Industrial metal; EBM; rock
- Years active: 1990–1995
- Labels: Kickin Records, MM Records Inc.
- Past members: Vincent James aka Vince St. James; Steve Von Kampen aka Steven Von Kampen; Tony Ball aka Tony Stone; Richard Kaltenhauser aka Richard K; Ford Shawcross; Pierre Xavier; John Clarke

Meat Machine was a British industrial rock band active during the first half of the 1990s. The band released two singles and one album, Slug, with independent label Pandemonium Records. Meat Machine was best known for the single "Times Of Addiction" which was played widely in industrial dance clubs and reached No. 7 on the Melody Maker Top Solid Grooves chart in 1992. Their electro rock song "Charles Manson (Rise and Fall)" samples interviews with the murder cult leader and was Kerrang! magazine's Single of the Week in 1993. The members of Meat Machine decided to split up after being approached to open for Nine Inch Nails in the UK and Europe.

== Recordings ==
Meat Machine signed with Pandemonium Records, releasing their debut single, "Times Of Addiction" / "Nightmare" in early 1992. According to the band, "Times Of Addiction" was about desperation and addictions in post-1980s society, ranging from drugs to desire. The flip-side of the single, "Nightmare", was about a controversial war involving Britain that had quickly been forgotten.

The 12-inch single "Charles Manson" was released in 1993. The song opens with a sample of Manson saying, "I'm God and I've killed everybody, now what?" It was followed by the LP Slug.

== Principal members ==
The early members of Meat Machine included:

- Vincent James – Vocalist, bassist
- Ford Shawcross – Keyboardist
- Tony Deville – Guitars
- Steven Von Kampen – Keyboard programmer

== Reception ==
A feature article in Melody Maker in 1991 described their music as "aural violence to shake your sleepy minds awake" and that the members of Meat Machine were "about as subtle as a blowtorch in the face". When "Times Of Addiction" charted in 1992, Melody Maker said the single was "Further proof that the boundary between hardcore dub and rock music is going the way of the Berlin Wall, from a group who look disturbingly like Alien Sex Fiend."

A review of Slug in the zine Impulse said, "After the excellent 'Charles Manson' 12", this is a little disappointing". The review rated the tracks "What's Yours" and "Talking To Blind Mountains" as the "most interesting", while comparing "Slug Ugly" and "Mirror Void" to "a distorted Ministry".

== Influence ==
- In 2003, the Japanese Gothic rock band Buck-Tick used songs from the Meat Machine Slug album as post-concert background music during its "Here we go again!" tour. Buck-Tick guitarist, songwriter and founding member Hisashi Imai named Slug as one of his favourite albums.
