= Phil Kieran =

- Born: 19 August 1978 (age 48)
- Origin: Belfast, Northern Ireland
- Occupations: Disc jockey, record producer, producer, recording artist and remixer
- Years active: 1995–present

Phil Kieran (born in 19 August 1978), is a Northern Irish DJ, electronic music producer, recording artist and remixer. He also composes original music and soundtracks for film and theatre, TV, radio and online media.

== Musical career ==
Phil Kieran's first solo release was RIP on Trama Industries in 2000. According to Discogs Phil has credits or appearances on 436 published musical works. As a solo artist, he has recorded for Cocoon, DMC, EMI, Hot Creations, Maeve, Novamute, Optimo, Skint, Snork, Soma, Virgin, Yoshitoshi and under his own label Phil Kieran Recording (PKR).

=== DJ career ===
Phil Kieran began his DJ career in 1995 aged 19, playing rock, indie, pop-chart music in local, Belfast nightclub the Limelight. The artist recalls 'pretending' to be an experienced DJ, borrowing his brothers CDs which led him to playing further gigs where he was able to 'sneak' techno music into his sets and build a name for himself as an electronic music DJ. In 1998 he became a resident DJ at Shine in his hometown of Belfast. By 2003 he signed to DJ agency Decked Out and began to play in clubs and festivals worldwide throughout the next two decades, playing in well-known clubs including Berghain (Berlin), D-Edge (Brazil) Fabric (London), Crobar (Buenos Aires), Privilege (Ibiza), Tresor (Berlin), Zouk (Singapore); festivals such as ADE (Amsterdam), Glastonbury (UK), Hard (LA), Strawberry Fields (New Zealand) as well as numerous clubs and parties throughout the UK, Ireland and worldwide. In the early 2000s Kieran was consistently ranked as a Top 100 Worldwide DJ. In 2002 he was awarded the Best Dance Act award at the BBC Hot Press awards.

Between 2014 and 2015 Phil presented on BBC Radio 1's dance music show, filling in for DJ Fergie on several occasions. He also produced BBC Essential Mixes including a 2007 session as Alloy Mental.

=== Productions ===
Phil Kieran has been releasing music since 2000. He has been described as a musical chameleon, who works under various guises; most of his dancefloor orientated work is self-named but in the early 2000s he released under pseudonyms Pil Hearin and Plastic Pervert. He uses the alter-ego, Burglar Tom, for creating various bootlegs. He is also the founding member and producer of EBM band Alloy Mental and a 3-player ensemble called Le Carousel.

He has released over 80 solo singles/EPs, three solo studio albums, 2 albums as Alloy Mental and Le Carousel and an album with Douglas J McCarthy of NItzer Ebb. His tracks appear on over 55 other artists albums and compilations by acts including, Patrice Baumel, Maya Jane Coles, Carl Cox, Terence Fixmer, David Holmes Richie Hawtin, DJ Hell, Robert Hood, Judge Jules, Chris Leibing, Ivan Smagghe, Tiga, James Zabiela as well as on numerous compilation albums by dance music labels, brands and nightclubs including Clubbed, DJ Mag, Global Underground and Ministry of Sound. Some of his most credited tracks include 'Vitalian House' (Kingsize 2001), "Next Life" - Meat Katie featuring Ithaka (Phil Kieran remix), 'My House' (Skint 2002), 'I love you' (Yoshitoshi 2003), 'Skyhook' (Novamute 2007), 'Missp' (Cocoon 2008),'I think I'm a monster' (PKR 2013) 'Wasps under a toy boat' (Cocoon 2018), 'Computer Games' (PKR 2014), 'Polyrhytmic' (Optimo 2018) and 'Endless Suspension' (Resist 2020).

In 2005 Phil Kieran formed a band called Alloy Mental, a collaboration with Irish singer-songwriter Martin Corrigan. They released four 12"s and followed this up with the June 2007 release of the album We Have Control. Alloy Mental's EBM sound was likened in the Guardian to 'Nitzer Ebb in a meat blender with the Stooges' which is no coincidence as Phil had remixed Nitzer Ebb track 'Murderous' for Mute in 2004 with Phil citing the band as a lifelong musical influence. He subsequently worked with Nitzer Ebb's Douglas J McCarthy on projects including the 'Fall Rise EP' released 2019 on Optimo. Alloy Mental supported New Order in 2007 and played a live set on Annie Mac's Radio 1 birthday show.

Phil Kieran released his debut solo album 'Shh' on Sven Vath's Cocoon Recordings in 2009. He has subsequently released solo albums 'Blinded by the Sun' on Hot Creations in 2016 and 'Life Cycling' on Mano Le Tough's label Maeve in 2019. In 2012 Phil released an album under the moniker Le Carousel, a studio-based creation incorporating songwriting and lyrics which Phil performed live with fellow Northern Irish musician Roisin Stewart, of the Desert Hearts. Performances of this album were the first time Phil also performed backing vocals. Notable remixes of Le Carousel include 'Lose your Love' by Andrew Weatherall and 'No Life' by Roman Flügel. It's been described as 'a woozy look back into childhood, a blissed out album of reflective songcraft, tinged with time-lapse psychedelia and shot through with hazy fairground ephemera... reimagined for the dancefloor, filtered through Phil's unerring techno sensibility'.

Phil Kieran and Green Velvet released a compilation 'series #001 which included tracks 'Michael Jackson' and 'Birds and Bees' and 'Rocket Yourself' in 2011. Apart from the album, the pair have remixed each other over the years; Phil provided remixes of Green Velvet's 'Preacher Man' in 2012 whilst Green Velvet remixed Phil's 'Skyhook' in 2010 for Phil Kieran Recordings.

In 2011, he created a concept album with Speedy J (aka Jochem Paap) called Workshops Vol.1 which explores the recording techniques used in the middle of the 20th century and dating right back to the mid-1950s.

The producer has an extensive remixing career; reworks include Depeche Mode's track 'Sweetest Perfection', Agoria's 'L'Onzieme Marche', Nitzer Ebb's 'Murderous', Groove Armada's Tripwire Andrew Weatherall/Asphodells' 'Late flowering lust'.

=== Film and TV, Theatre and Media ===
In 2017 Phil became the electronic music ambassador for the Ulster Orchestra. As part of the European Orchestra Laboratory (EOLab II) project Phil, alongside viola player Jonathon Simmance facilitated up and coming Northern Irish musicians at Celtronic studios to create original music. Speaking of the process Kieran has said, 'this collaboration has given us all a chance to share expertise and write pieces from scratch that could be performed with a synthesised sound or its equivalent acoustic instrument...It has both dance-music and classical sensibilities at its heart...I've always felt that classical music and electronica have more in common than what sets them apart, Beethoven knew how to hammer home a phrase. His music's power and ability to release emotion probably made it the techno of its day." Phil has worked with individual members of the orchestra as session recordists for his own solo-productions and in the creation of music for film. During the COVID-19 pandemic lockdown in 2021, Phil recorded with the orchestra at an audience-less Waterfront Hall as part of a special Radio Ulster series.

In 2018 Kieran created the music for the theatrical stage play 'East Belfast Boy' by Prime Cut productions which was later adapted into a film featuring a revised score by the artist. In 2019 Phil created his first original score for film, for a BBC documentary about fellow Northern Irish artist Oliver Jeffers.

Phil created the original score for 'Rough', a short film written and directed by Declan Lawn and Adam Patterson. In 2020, it won Best Irish Short at the Kerry Film Festival. In 2021 the film won an IFTA (Irish Film &TV Awards) for Best short film; a golden dragon for best short fiction film at Krakow Film Festival and a bronze medal at the Manhattan Short Film Festival. It is currently on the long list for a BAFTA nomination in 2022.

Phil scored his first radio documentary in 2021, 'The Northern Bank Job: Unexpected Visitors', produced by Conor Garrett and written and narrated by author Glenn Patterson. The 11-part documentary series was originally aired on BBC Radio 4. It received a special commendation at the Prix Europa and has been widely distributed via BBC sounds and radio 4 podcasts. It was charted as a number one most listened to Apple podcast in drama / fiction in the UK.

In 2021, Phil Kieran scored and soundtracked his first feature film 'Nightride', directed by Stephen Fingleton. It stars Moe Dunford as a small-time drug dealer trying to pull off one last deal before going straight. The dark-humoured thriller was shot, in real time in one take in Belfast during the COVID-19 lockdown. It was chosen for the Industry Selects section of the Toronto International Film Festival.

Phil Kieran's music has been synchronised to various film, TV, computer games and other online media, notably tracks 'I cant help myself', 'Paint and Chemicals department', 'Two Minds' feature on BAFTA winning TV series Killing Eve; 'We have Control' (Alloy Mental) is on the Sony PlayStation 2007 game Gran Turismo 5 Prologue; 'Snakes Crawl' featured on Gucci's Spring/Summer 2015 shows and advertising campaign. Phil co-wrote and engineered music with David Holmes used on Steven Soderbergh's feature film The Girlfriend Experience and his music has seen synchronisation on various TV shows like UK soap opera Hollyoaks and US legal thriller Damages.
