= David Tipper =

British composer and producer

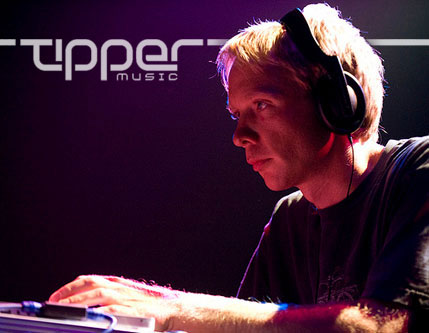
- Dave Tipper performing live in 2010

Background information
- Also known as: Tipper
- Born: David Alexander Tipper c. 1976 (age 49–50); Wimbledon, London
- Genres: Electronic, breakbeat, glitch hop, trip hop, ambient
- Occupations: Producer, composer, DJ
- Years active: 1997–2026
- Labels: Tippermusic, MyUtopia, Higher Ground, Fuel Records (UK)
- Website: tippermusic.net

David Alexander Tipper, also known as Tipper for short (born c. 1976 in Wimbledon, London, England) is a British composer and producer specialising in electronic music that ranges from ambient, through trip hop, to uptempo nu skool breaks. His live performances consist largely of his own unreleased compositions, and he is noted for scratching his own sounds over his music, creating a live element of turntablism stemming from prowess early in his career as a vinyl DJ.

Tipper is widely respected as a surround sound composer, releasing one of the first albums composed, produced, and intended for the DualDisc format, in addition to providing content for multichannel music industry leaders DTS, Inc. His talents at sound design (his work is included in several of the major music making software programs), and in digital audio mastering, are also in great demand. His catalogue has been consistently licensed for use as background in a variety of mainstream television programmes, and also featured in commercials and cable television projects.

== Career ==
Tipper was "discovered" as a teenager DJing in a London nightclub by soon-to-be manager Richie Warren. Their earliest conversations centred on bass frequencies and rhythms underlying beats, and they began researching the science involved in creating the most effective dance music. Richie founded Fuel Records (UK), and Tipper released the first of several vinyl EP's in 1997. Renault licensed one of these, Twister, for a European ad campaign. Soon thereafter, Sony UK signed Tipper to their fledgling dance music label, Higher Ground.

=== Higher Ground ===
In the late 1990s, Tipper completed numerous remix projects of his Higher Ground label mates, and released several singles, each highlighting his penchant for electronic dance music with extreme bass frequencies and intricate polyrhythms; this sound helped usher in a popular new music genre referred to as Nu skool breaks, and Tipper is recognised as one of the pioneering producers of this movement. In 1999 Tipper released his first album, The Critical Path. It was not, however, the breakbeat dance record that the label hoped for. Tipper's vision was decidedly more artistic than anticipated, confusing the label as to how to promote it, and disappointing sales led to an amicable parting of ways with Sony.

=== The Fuel years ===
During the late 1990s while Tipper was busy in the studio, Richie Warren & Co conceptualised the Fuel Sound System. This consisted of 2 identical black 1970s Dodge Challengers, both fitted with 6 x18" subwoofers (replacing where the back seats had previously been) and a Funktion-One mid/tops speaker unit, that could be raised out of the trunk on hydraulics with the flick of a switch from the driver's dashboard. These cars were able to run independently, without the need for an electrical generator, using 6 batteries charged via an alternator salvaged out of a lorry. With a totally discreet and fully mobile sound system, the Fuel crew, assuming the role of sonic pranksters, began a "pilgrimage" of sound that took them on tour to various music festivals, parties & spontaneous gatherings, setting them up outside events and garnering attention for the label and its artists. One of the urban myths surrounding these appearances recounts the incident at the 1997 V Festival, when Richie Warren received complaints from The Prodigy's stage manager, because the band couldn't hear itself due to the excess volume.

With this activity as a backdrop, Tipper released his second album Holding Pattern in early 2001. Many of the individual tracks from this album found their way into DJ boxes internationally, and accordingly Tipper began touring extensively through Europe, the United States and Australia. Reflecting his travels was the DJ Mix album Sound Off which he completed for Fuel later the same year. Tipper focused on the music, and Richie promoted a lifestyle – taking the cars wherever possible to create a happening around both.

=== Crunch ===
Tipper and long time friend Mike Wallis formed Crunch in the late 1990s. The pair released two albums and several EP's together over the following years on labels such as Musik Aus Strom and Mike's own imprint Colony Productions. The Full Moon Gathering 2016 was their first USA performance together in over a decade.

=== MyUtopia ===
Under the guise of “Correctional Facilities” he created his first Surround Sound album called “Cell: Five”.Then later while touring across the United States in 2003 with the Fuel cars, Tipper began composing tracks for what would become his first “Tipper” album intended entirely as a surround sound listening experience. Surrounded was released in 2004 by fledgling 5.1 venture MyUtopia Recordings. Eventually nominated as Best Album Intended for Surround Sound this downtempo album also marked a turn in Tipper's musical output away from the nu skool breaks genre which he was more widely associated with. It was during this period that digital music sales and/or reproduction usurped the music industry, and ultimately Fuel Records (UK) met its demise. As Tipper toured and performed his album in 5.1 wherever possible, Richie re-focused his talents towards advanced automobile parts, and Tipper set off on a non-stop touring schedule for two years, with London only a temporary base between tours. Constantly seen living out of his suitcase, and keeping his "studio" in his backpack, earned him the temporary moniker The Global Nomad.

Late 2004 saw his Surrounded album re-released as a DualDisc title, and this in turn led to the creation of a MP3 Surround Sound Player, by mp3 rights holders Fraunhofer Society. Regarded as one of the foremost composers in the multichannel realm, Tipper continues to provide content for a number of companies who use his highly detailed productions to demonstrate their own advanced technologies.

=== Tippermusic ===
2005 witnessed the establishment of his own imprint Tippermusic, and he embraced the digital music revolution for the freedom it gave musicians to finally determine their own path. No longer constrained by label requirements, Tipper set about releasing his music independently, mostly via online stores. Some investment was made in CDs and vinyl, but ultimately online sales figures showed their declining relevance for his style of output.

Tipper began releasing albums at an accelerated rate. First was the ground breaking Tip Hop, which focused on merging hip hop production with electronic trickery and helped usher in a new genre referred to as glitch hop. He immediately followed up with Relish The Trough, which was material consisting of compositions from his catalogue used primarily for his performances on tour. Both albums found favour in Hollywood, and a number of tracks were used as background in prime-time television shows.

His second full downtempo release The Seamless Unspeakable Something debuted in 2006, with Tipper in full guise as an electronica trip hop artist. Tracks from this album also found favour as background music for TV shows. In 2007, he digitally remastered his old vinyl catalogue and quietly released The Fuel Years and Higher Ground. In early 2008, he made more of his unreleased "performance catalogue" available when he released Tertiary Noise, a production which was rumored to be his final foray into the uptempo breakbeat genre that he helped create, and which also used some earlier releases from the likes of The Seamless Unspeakable Something, Relish The Trough, and Holding Pattern as source material for its production.

His 9th studio album, Wobble Factor would be unveiled later in 2008, and solidified Tipper's influence on the burgeoning glitch hop musical movement, especially in the United States.

Shortly after its release, his health demanded his immediate focus, curtailing his studio time and forcing cancellation of all tour dates. While recuperating over time, he laboured on his new ambient/downtempo LP, Broken Soul Jamboree. This album showcased many facets of Tipper's composition and production style, with striking artwork for the album cover and a limited edition poster accompanying the initial CD run.

After Broken Soul Jamboree, Tipper released a series of EPs. These included Snake Eyes, the Bubble Control/Puzzle Dust/Shatter Box trilogy, and an EP of three remixes from that trilogy, "Dusty Bubble Box", which was released to raise money for his medical expenses. In 2013, Tipper announced he would only participate in two festival appearances for health reasons. On 6 June, he underwent a successful mitral valve repair surgery. Shortly after his recovery, the full-length album Forward Escape was released in 2014. It took on a darker, more electronically-driven tone than its predecessors, and marked the beginning of a new Tipper sound. He has since released an EP with a similar sound, Fathoms, and a more purely electronic EPs, It's Like..., and "Lattice". The most recent full-length album, "Jettison Mind Hatch", continues the pattern of downtempo, atmospheric soundscapes that almost enter the realm of ambient.

His notoriety has risen considerably in these years as well, and he is often featured as a headlining act at electronic music festivals spanning the entire continental US, with an extensive showing on the West Coast and occasional East Coast shows. Often, especially when he plays over multiple evenings, Tipper splits his sets into "uptempo" and "downtempo." His "uptempo" sets feature fast tempos and tend toward being a wild dance party. His downtempo sets feature slow to medium tempos and heavy use of melodies. He has also begun to play occasional ambient sets, which generally have limited seating and sell out quickly.

As of 2015, Tipper continues to play concerts a few times a year, and frequently appears at Burning Man.

In April 2016, Tipper headlined his first ever appearance at the Spirit of the Suwannee Music Park in Live Oak, Florida, USA, during Tipper & Friends - The Full Moon Gathering. He confirmed after the show that he would return in 2017.

In August 2017, Tipper curated his own Tipper & Friends music festival at the Astral Valley Art Park, 45 minutes south of St. Louis, Missouri.^{[17]} The event was called '4321' and was held to commemorate the 2017 Solar Eclipse. The venue itself is located in the path of direct totality, and attendees were provided custom Tipper-themed safety glasses to view the event.

In January 2018, Tipper curated yet another "Tipper & Friends" event, this installment being a "4 Nights in NOLA" event (also known as the "4567" event) located in New Orleans, Louisiana. This event took place from 4 to 7 January and featured two historic New Orleans venues: Tipitina's & the Orpheum Theater. In further homage to New Orleans culture and musical heritage, the event included legendary local acts such as DJ Cochon de Lait and The Madd Wikkid.

Following the conclusion of the "4567" event, it was announced that Tipper is expected to present an "ambient journey" performance on 20 April at the Arlene Schnitzer Concert Hall in Portland, Oregon. The event is also listed to feature legendary kora players Toumani Diabaté and Sidiki Diabaté.

Following the success of 2016's event, April 2019 lead to the historic "Tipper & Friends - The Full Moon Return" back in Spirit of the Suwannee Music Park in Live Oak, Florida, USA.

In January 2020, Tipperfam assembled for another "Tipper & Friends" event with a 3-night run back in NOLA (New Orleans, Louisiana). This event took place from 3 to 5 January, this time around playing at The Saenger Theatre. In continuing to pay homage to New Orleans culture and musical heritage, the theatre was left with a great impression of the community involved, even going as far engaging with the crowd in the spirit of Tipper during the 3rd and final night, as this event was extremely private with very few in attendance. The unofficial after-parties deep within the streets of NOLA continued to further the Tipper-vibes until beyond sunrise. This 3-day event was the 8th, and most recent, installment of the "Tipper & Friends" events to date.

In April 2022, Tipper & Friends was again held for another 3 night run, returning to Spirit of the Suwannee Music Park in Live Oak, Florida. The 3 day event was held from April 1-3rd and featured LTJ Bukem, Mickman, Schmoop, Humandala, Resonant Language, Detox Unit and Entangled Mind (winner of the submission contest)

In February 2024, Tipper announced his intention to retire in 2025, stating "I'm very grateful for all the support over the years." He has since performed at multiple festivals and curated events, including Rendezvous, Lightning in a Bottle, Secret Dreams, Snowta and his own Tipper and Friends events in Alabama (The Orion Amphitheater) and Washington (The Gorge Amphitheater).

On Sunday, September 21st, 2025, Tipper played the presumed last show of his career at Red Rocks Amphitheater in Morrison, Colorado.

== Discography ==
=== Albums ===
Year	Title	Label
1999	The Critical Path	Higher Ground
2001	Holding Pattern	Fuel Records (UK)
2003	Surrounded	Myutopia Recordings
2005	Tip Hop	Tippermusic
2006	Relish the Trough	Tippermusic
2006	The Seamless Unspeakable Something	Tippermusic
2008	Tertiary Noise	Tippermusic
2008	Wobble Factor	Tippermusic
2010	Broken Soul Jamboree	Tippermusic
2014	Forward Escape	Tippermusic
2019	Jettison Mind Hatch	Tippermusic
2022	Marble Hunting	Tippermusic
2026	Cloaked	Tippermusic

=== EPs ===
Year	Title	Label
1997	Six Pak	Fuel Records (UK)
1997	Bassgunner	Fuel Records (UK)
1998	Twister	Fuel Records (UK)
1999	L.E.D. Down	Higher Ground
1999	Supersport	Higher Ground
1999	Supersport (Remixes)	Higher Ground
2000	Dissolve (Out)	Higher Ground
2001	Tug of War	Fuel Records (UK)
2001	Furlong	Fuel Records (UK)
2001	Sound Off	Fuel Records (UK)
2002	Sound Off 2	Fuel Records (UK)
2002	Donut	Fuel Records (UK)
2005	Open The Jowls	Tippermusic
2005	Ruck	Tippermusic
2006	What's Heavy/RE: Am I?	Tippermusic
2006	Unlock The Geometry/Deal With It	Tippermusic
2008	Learning Is Remembering	Tippermusic
2011	Snake Eyes	Tippermusic
2011	Bubble Control	Tippermusic
2012	Puzzle Dust	Tippermusic
2012	Shatter Box	Tippermusic
2013	Algae Bloom In Seven	Tippermusic
2013	Dusty Bubble Box	Tippermusic
2015	Fathoms	Tippermusic
2015	Its Like	Tippermusic
2017	Flunked	Tippermusic
2017	Lattice	Tippermusic
2021	Insolito	Tippermusic
