= Can You See Us? =

2022 drama film directed by Kenny Mumba

- Directed by: Kenny Mumba
- Written by: Andrew Thompson; Lawrence Thompson
- Produced by: Yasmin Dodia; Lawrence Thompson
- Starring: Thabo Kaamba; George Sikazwe; Ruth Jule; Kangwa Chileshe; Kondwani Elliot Zulu
- Cinematography: Chosa Mweemba; Daliso Nyirenda; Brendan Wasserman
- Edited by: Nathan Busumani; Leon Gerber
- Music by: Sam Nyambe; Magnus Mando
- Distributed by: Netflix
- Release date: October 26, 2022
- Running time: 109 minutes
- Country: Zambia
- Languages: English; Chichewa

Can You See Us? is a 2022 Zambian film. It was directed by Kenny Mumba and loosely fictionalised by Andrew Thompson and Lawrence Thompson.

The film is loosely based on the life of the John Chiti, a child born with albinism. It premiered on Netflix on 27 August 2023, becoming the first Zambian film to be released on the platform.

Harry Graham, Producer at BBC mentions, "Growing up with albinism, Zambian singer John Chiti faced a lot of stigma. As a boy, he was bullied, and as an adult he faced barriers to his music."

== Plot ==
Joseph is born with albinism to a family in Zambia and is immediately rejected by his father, who believes the child is a curse. Despite this rejection, Joseph’s mother raises him with love and determination, encouraging him to pursue education and believe in himself. As he grows up, Joseph faces persistent discrimination and bullying from his peers and members of the community because of his condition.

At school, Joseph struggles socially but discovers a passion and talent for music. Encouraged by supportive individuals in his life, he begins to develop confidence through singing and performing. However, he continues to face rejection, including from his father, whose refusal to accept him deeply affects him emotionally.

As Joseph matures, he remains determined to overcome the challenges associated with albinism and social stigma. Through perseverance and the support of his mother and others who believe in him, he continues to pursue his musical ambitions. Eventually, Joseph’s talent gains recognition, helping him build a sense of identity and purpose.

Over time, his success leads to a change in how some people around him view him, including members of his family. Joseph’s journey reflects his resilience in the face of rejection and highlights broader issues surrounding the treatment of people with albinism in society.

== Cast ==
- Thabo Kaamba as Young Joseph
- George Sikazwe as Older Joseph
- Ruth Jule as Chama
- Chileleko T. Kalusa as Baby Joseph
- Kondwani Elliot Zulu as Martin
- Kristin Owen as Neighbor
- Didi Mercy Sakala as Nurse
- Dinga'tse Sendama as Teacher
- Fransisca Muchangwe (Francisca M. Muchangwe) as Jennifer
- Robert Nyirenda as Mad Man
