= Yvonne Curtis =

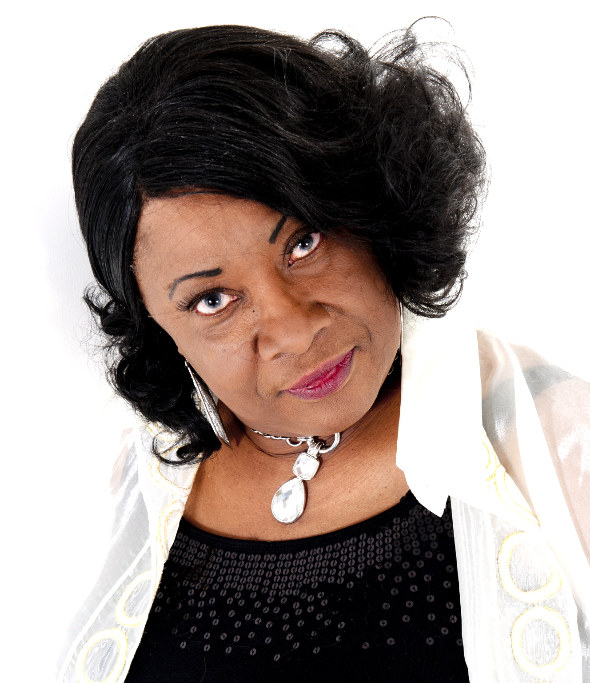
- Yvonne Curtis in 2015

Background information
- Born: Yvonne McIntosh; Steer Town, Saint Ann Parish, Jamaica, West Indies
- Genres: Reggae, roots reggae, calypso, lovers rock, soca
- Occupations: Singer, songwriter
- Years active: 1960–present
- Labels: Digital Jukebox, Third World Music, Empire Records, Browns Music Records
- Website: yvonnecurtis.com

Yvonne Curtis (born Yvonne McIntosh) is a singer of Jamaican descent. She has lived in the United Kingdom since the early 1960s. She became the lead singer of the Serenaders and often travels back and forth from the Caribbean Islands performing as a reggae and soca artist.

== History ==
Born and raised in Jamaica, the young gospel singer Curtis left St. Ann's, Jamaica in the 1960s as a teenager for a better life and education in England. She continued her musical career from her new home in Highbury and Islington, London. Whilst studying in college in the 1970s, Curtis sang in many local bands before she decided it was time to seriously pursue her singing career.

=== 1970s–1990s ===
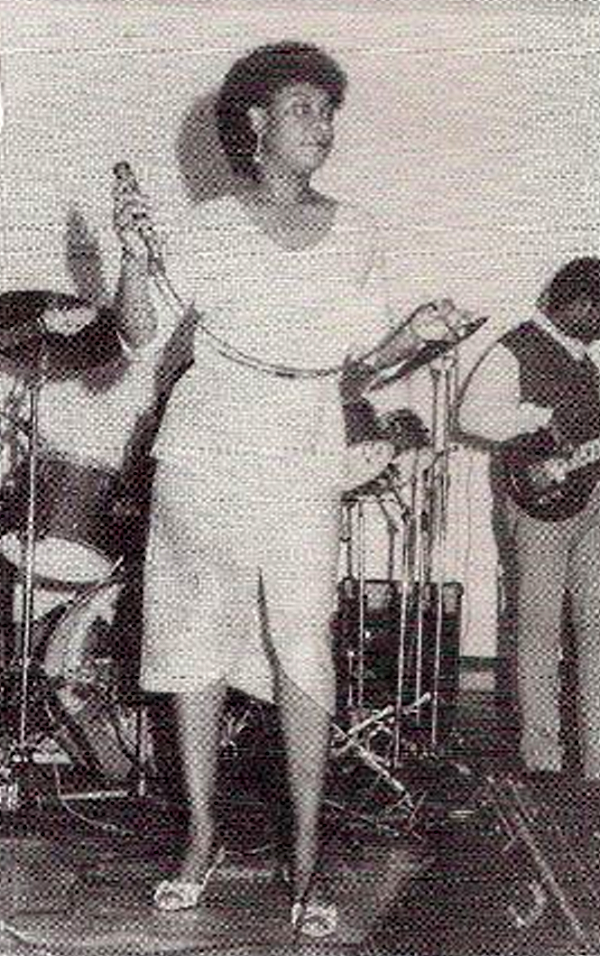
Yvonne Curtis with the Serenaders in 1978

A local recording producer needed a backing vocalist for his musical project and a contest was held in Stockwell, South London. Having been advised to enter, the young Curtis came second in the contest to her best friend. The producer took them both on asking them to conduct vocals session works.

During the mid-1970s, Curtis joined a local band called the Okendoes and Chalis but she found no real success. After many different small projects in 1975 and no real commercial success, she began working with a record label called Third World Music under Shelly Barrett a.k.a. Count Shelly who released Curtis's first song titled "What's Your Name" which was an instant success. Things began moving and she soon left Third World Records to sign with London's Empire Records, a subsidiary of Jamaica's Channel One Studios, with whom she released another self-penned hit song called "Convenient Woman".

After two years, she left Empire Records to release her own single called "No Charge" on World Sounds Records, before joining a successful reggae band called the Serenaders who were signed to Brown's Music Records. The first release by this band was a single titled "Only for Lovers". Soon after came "Sweet Loving" which was another successful hit song written by Curtis. The song did extremely well and caused a huge demand for her tours and performances globally. During 1994, she travelled to Germany, Nicaragua and Brazil, creating a fan base and performed on Warehouse Showcase on London's Carlton Television. In 1998, she appeared with Pete Campbell on The Big Breakfast on Channel 4 and featured in songs by the Reggae Boys. During this time, she was constantly writing and recording songs under Brown's Music & World Sounds Records both as a solo artist and under the band named 'Wavet' which included further performances at the Royal Albert Hall in London.

=== 2000s ===
In the year 2000, the Serenaders fell apart upon the death of three of its members and Curtis went back to World Sound Records to continue recording her new songs. In 2013, in a joint venture with Browns Records, she released an album entitled Lets Unite in Love which was distributed by VP Records in the US. The album was an instant success and caused a notable demand for Curtis' music worldwide. In 2015, Curtis met record producer and label owner Mark Duffus and joined Digital Jukebox Records in 2015. The first release was a three-CD compilation of her greatest hits, followed by a crossover version of the Christmas medley "When a Child Is Born" / "Mary's Boy Child". John Nolan, a journalist and reviewer for Reggae in New York spoke very highly of the album's success in the United States, stating, "Often the most talented artists go for decades without the commercial recognition they deserve. Despite her lack of commercial success Curtis is a driving force in reggae music with an evolving sound that has spanned the entire reggae spectrum. Since 1978 she has released 11 albums, as well as numerous compilations and singles."

=== 2020s ===
Curtis travels back and forth between Jamaica and London. She has found her home with Digital Jukebox Records and is continuing to release and write new songs with her producers. During a radio interview in Gloucester by presenter Perry Jay for the Reggae Time Show, Jay described the show as absolutely fantastic stating how the crowds would continuously sing her songs back to her in appreciation."

In a May 2020 interview by Yasmine Peru for The Gleaner, she spoke of the success of her global hit song "Sweet Sensation" and how she was initially introduced to UK music executive Mark Duffus, owner of Digital Jukebox Records in 2015. Curtis was a regular act on the mid-1980s weekly Carlton Television show The Warehouse, presented by British comedian Miles Crawford, where she was and still is considered one of the hardest-working Jamaican female reggae vocalists in the business. Through her challenges on the road to recognition and her upcoming documentary, Untold Reggae, which traces her life from her roots in Steer Town, Saint Ann Parish to the present, Curtis was very excited about her future and return to performing in South America.

In the following month, she was interviewed by Jerade James for Future Topic magazine and Black British Musicians, reminising her performance at London's Royal Albert Hall for Barbados independence during the mid-1990s, along with other reputable soca music artists like the Mighty Gabby and Grynner.

In October 2022, Curtis was featured in the "Black History Month" special edition of Vogue magazine for her continuing hard work in reggae music since the 1960s, speaking of her life living in Jamaica and London through the past decades. Curtis is one of the very few original globally recognised female vocalists of the reggae genre to have been ever selected to be featured in Vogue magazine. She is currently mentored and managed by Mark Duffus and regularly performs at the nationwide UK Reggae Land festival on a yearly basis where she has been considered to be "The hardest working woman in reggae" by Lorna Edwards of Reflector magazine.

== Discography ==
=== Albums ===
- 1986 In the Country, Brown Records
- 1992 Yvonne Cutis & Wavet – Socca, Brown Records
- 1995 Best of Yvonne Curtis, Brown Records
- 1997 Yvonne Says Hello, World Sound
- 2000 Move On, Brown Records
- 2000 Yvonne Curtis 2000, World Sound
- 2002 Just as I Am-Gospel, World Sound
- 2004 Eternal Love, World Sound
- 2004 Walls of Tears, World Sound
- 2006 Table for Two, World Sound
- 2013 Let's Unite in Love, Brown Records
- 2014 Greatest Hits, Digital Jukebox Records

=== Singles ===
- 1978 "What's Your Name", Third World
- 1979 "Convenient Woman" b/w "Rather Go Blind", Empire Records
- (N/A) "No Charge", BB Records
- (N/A) "Only for Lovers", Brown Music
- 1983 "Road March-Socca", Brown Music
- 1985 "Sweet Loving", Brown Music
- 1986 "Bob Marley Medley", Brown Music
- 1987 "Harder They Come, Brown Music
- 1990 "Welcome Home", Brown Music
- 1993 "This Is a Letter", Brown Music
- 1999 "Don't Let Me Down", Jet Star
- (N/A) "Troubled in Mind", Brown Music
- 2015 Christmas Carols, Digital Jukebox Records
- 2017 "Far Away (From Your Heart)", Digital Jukebox Records
- 2018 "Dedicated to You", Digital Jukebox Records
- 2019 "Son of a Preacher Man", Digital Jukebox Records
- 2020 "Sweet Sensation" (remastered), Digital Jukebox Records
- 2022 "People Get Ready", Digital Jukebox Records
- 2022 "Open the Door to Your Heart" (remixed), Digital Jukebox Records
- 2025 "Dinner (For Jamaica)", Digital Jukebox Records

== See also ==
- List of Jamaicans
- List of reggae musicians
