= Don Armando =

American musician

- Born: August 9, 1946; East Harlem, New York, US
- Died: November 16, 2002; Seattle, Washington, US
- Instrument: drums
- Formerly of: Second Avenue Rhumba Band; Dr. Buzzard's Original Savannah Band

Armando Bonilla Jr. (August 9, 1946 – November 16, 2002), known as Don Armando, was an American musician. He formed the Second Avenue Rhumba Band with vocalist Fonda Rae and scored a #1 hit on the Hot Dance Music/Club Play chart with "Deputy of Love" in 1979. Bonilla was also a percussionist with Dr. Buzzard's Original Savannah Band.

== Biography ==
Armando "Sonny" Bonilla was born and raised in East Harlem, New York City, the eldest sibling of a family composed of five sons of a Puerto Rican father – Roman Armando Bonilla, the leader of the East Harlem Orchestra – and a Colombian mother. After completing a tour of duty with the United States Air Force, he graduated from New York University with a bachelor's degree in Computer Science, and later he acquired a master's degree from Columbia University. One of his younger brothers, Luis Bonilla, played congas on Larry Harlow's breakout album Heavy Smokin'. Another brother, Nestor, is also a professional percussionist.

He worked on Sesame Street, before joining Dr. Buzzard's Original Savannah Band. He left in 1978 to form Don Armando's 2nd Avenue Rhumba Band. He also worked as a session musician in New York. He wrote a treatment for a sitcom called "Cowboy Tito" while living in Hollywood and was producing a musical called "The Love of a Jukebox Hero". He co-wrote "Mambo Queen" with L.A. composer Aaron Loo. The Second Avenue Rhumba Band's song, "Goin' to a Showdown," and "Winter Love " was featured in the 1980 horror film Maniac.

Don Armando died in 2002, in Seattle, from cancer at the age of 56.

== Discography ==
- 1979 Don Armando's Second Avenue Rhumba Band (ZE Records)
  - A1. "Deputy of Love"
  - A2. "Compliment Your Leading Lady"
  - A3. "Winter Love"
  - B1. "Goin' to a Showdown"
  - B2. "How to Handle a Woman"
  - B3. "I'm an Indian Too"
  - B4. "Para Ti" / "This Is Just for You"

== See also ==
- List of Number 1 Dance Hits (United States)
- List of artists who reached number one on the US Dance chart
