= Dee Shy =

Doreen Mason
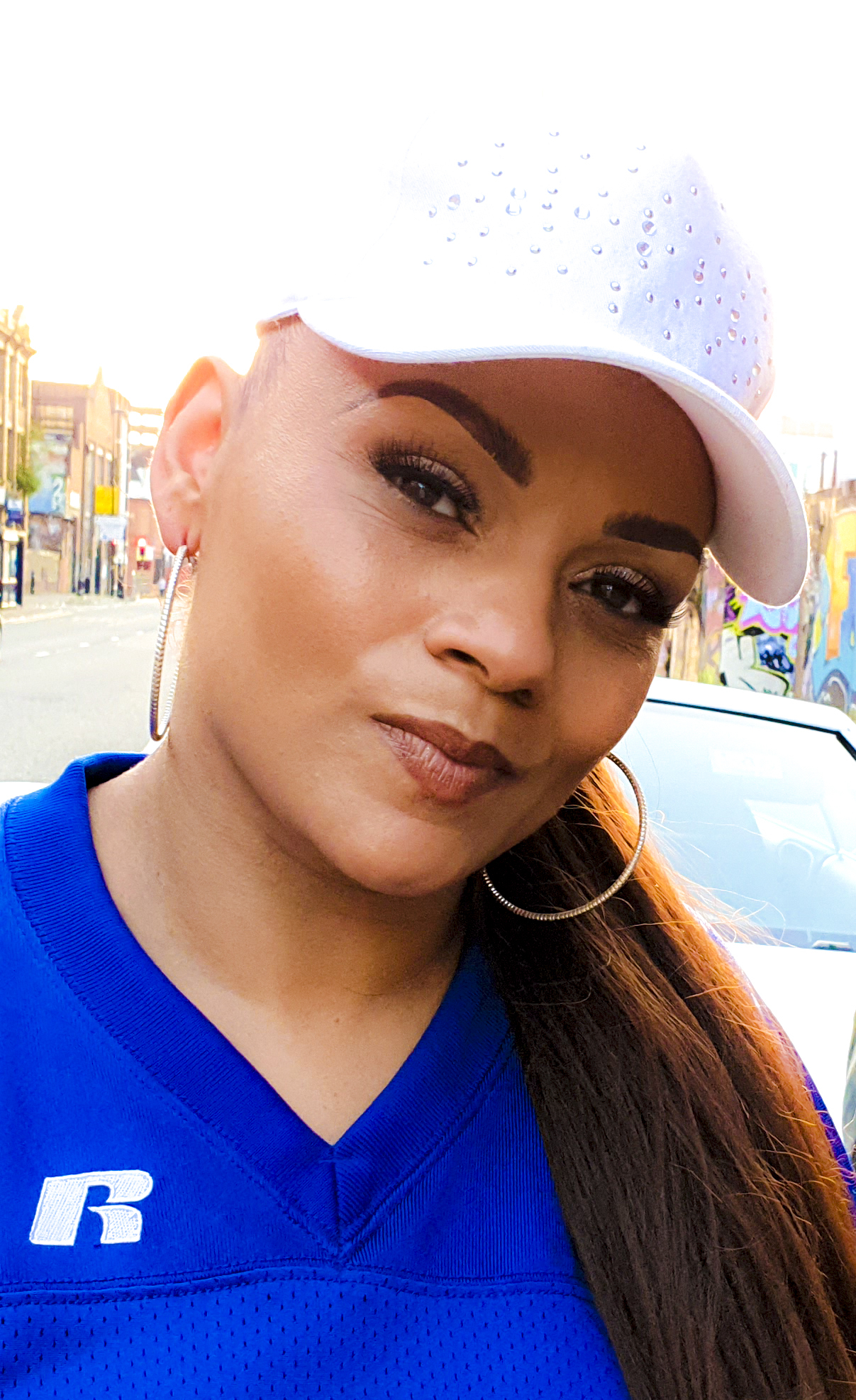

Background information
- Also known as: Dee Shy
- Born: Doreen Samantha Mason; Birmingham, England
- Genre: Hip hop
- Occupation: rapper
- Instrument: vocals
- Years active: 1986–present
- Label: Digital Jukebox
- Website: www.deeshy.com

Dee Shy (born Doreen Samantha Mason in May 1973) is a British rapper. She has been rapping since the mid-1980s alongside her husband Darren Mason from the French band SKO (RME) who were originally a Birmingham-based commercial rap trio from the UK who were signed to Sony BMG France under NRG Music.

== History ==
Shy worked within the beauty industry and was featured in the "Black Hair Magazine", which was an "international bi-monthly magazine for the style-conscious celebrity black women around the world". In 2001 Mason survived a car accident. During an interview with Jerade James Jr for Future Topic and Black British Musicians Magazine, she stated how the incident had changed her perception of life, and she decided to tone down her lyrical content towards Hip Hop. This change caught the attention of the Gospel music genre who mildly associated her with the movement.

== Discography ==
=== Singles ===
- 2020 "Crossroads on Digital Jukebox Records
- 2020 "Love Like That on Digital Jukebox Records
- 2021 "Roll'in on Digital Jukebox Records
- 2022 "Witness on Digital Jukebox Records
- 2024 "Mama Raised on Digital Jukebox Records

== Today ==
Although she's not fully considered a Gospel recording artist it was during an award ceremony in 2019 held in Birmingham where she was introduced to the UK music executive, record producer and rapper, Mark Duffus, (Blak Prophetz), owner of Digital Jukebox Records. She sent him her rap songs and she was later signed to his record label in the same year to release more conscious rap songs including the mentoring of problematic youth within her community.
