= Funk Division =

British soul jazz and funk band

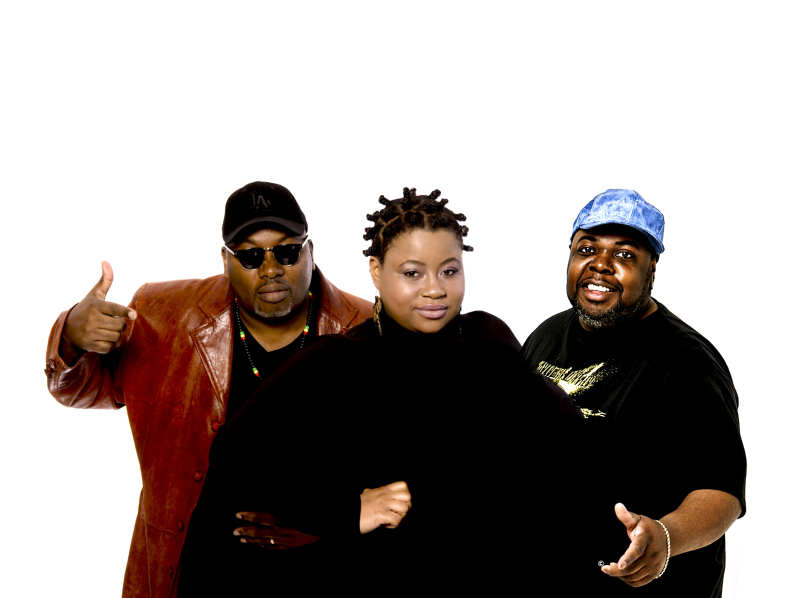

Background information
- Also known as: The Soul Garden
- Origin: Walsall, Staffordshire, England
- Genres: Jazz, funk, soul, acid jazz, electronic
- Instrument(s): Drums, vocals, synths, sampler
- Years active: 1994–present
- Labels: Digital Jukebox Records
- Members: Mark Duffus; Derek King (DJ DK) Xiomara Mukwendi
- Website: www.funkdivision.com

The Funk Division, also known as The Soul Garden earlier from 1994, is a soul jazz and funk group formed in 2005 by Mark Duffus (of Blak Prophetz) in Walsall near Birmingham, United Kingdom.

== History ==
The first release as the Funk Division came out in 2015 with a retro song and music video entitled "Want You", written and produced by Mark Duffus. Ed Potten, music journalist from The Times and Sunday Times newspaper described it as "a soulful, organ-driven funk with a twinkle in its eye" Chris Wells, editor of Echoes described it as "uncluttered, attidinous, energetic funk. DeRobert fans ought to love it."

A similar review came from Camilla Cassidy of The Edge magazine. In her review she said:

"The song starts somewhat 60s, with strong and slick female vocals with power that echoes the song’s statements of independence and self-affirmation. Choruses build to deliver a rich sounding take on modern jazz; power and bluesy instrumentation are layered with quick lyrics to give a smooth, polished sound."

The next song to follow was "Tell Me Something" which contained two individual mixes by the duo. On 18 April 2016, a review by Soul, Jazz & Funk magazine described the song as "hugely insistent, picking up plays in the more discerning soul clubs". An additional review by Andrew Gee of USA's Impact Global magazine described the track as one that "takes you back to the future of black music."

The third release from the duo was "Right On", written and produced by Mark Duffus.

== 2018–present ==
Soon after came "If You Were Mine". The dance and disco mixes were produced by Duffus whereas the house/garage mix versions were produced by Derek King. Chris Wells, editor of Echoes added his preference to this song being that of the Soul Mix version that was also produced by Duffus/Sure Shot describing it as:

"Soft and bouncy maybe what Kindred might have sound like if they had a young Michael Jackson in as a guest vocalist.

During the summer of 2019, a smoother song entitled "The Things I Said" (written and produced by Duffus/Sure Shot) had elements of Roland Corporation affiliations or sponsorship. Its success caught the eye of the Midlands newspaper Express & Star editorial senior sub editor Leigh Sanders who quoted:

"The new single delivers a much more laid back, soulful and emotional vibe which is very different from their previous energetic songs. Yet it's smooth and incredibly jazzy"

Bill B of Soul and Jazz and Funk magazine had similar things to say in his review 'Saying Things' quoting: "A gentle, soulful ballad, 'The Things I Said' which shows Ms Paulwell-Thindell's delicate, quivering vocal to excellent effect. After a few plays it become almost hypotonic."

== Discography ==
=== Singles ===
- 2006: "Butterflies" - The Soul Garden, Digital Jukebox Records
- 2009: "Groovy Day" - The Soul Garden, Digital Jukebox Records
- 2011: "What She Really Needs" - The Soul Garden, Digital Jukebox Records
- 2012: "Missing You" - Andre Espeut & The Soul Garden, Digital Jukebox Records
- 2013: "Don't Stop (The Hustle)" - The Soul Garden, Digital Jukebox Records
- 2013: "Addicted to You" - The Soul Garden, Digital Jukebox Records
- 2014: "Dimensions" - The Soul Garden, Digital Jukebox Records
- 2015: "Want You" - The Funk Division, Digital Jukebox Records
- 2016: "Tell Me Something" - The Funk Division, Digital Jukebox Records
- 2017: "Right On" - The Funk Division, Digital Jukebox Records
- 2018: "If You Were Mine" - The Funk Division, Digital Jukebox Records
- 2019: "The Things I Said" - The Funk Division, Digital Jukebox Records
