= Blackbud =

English indie rock band

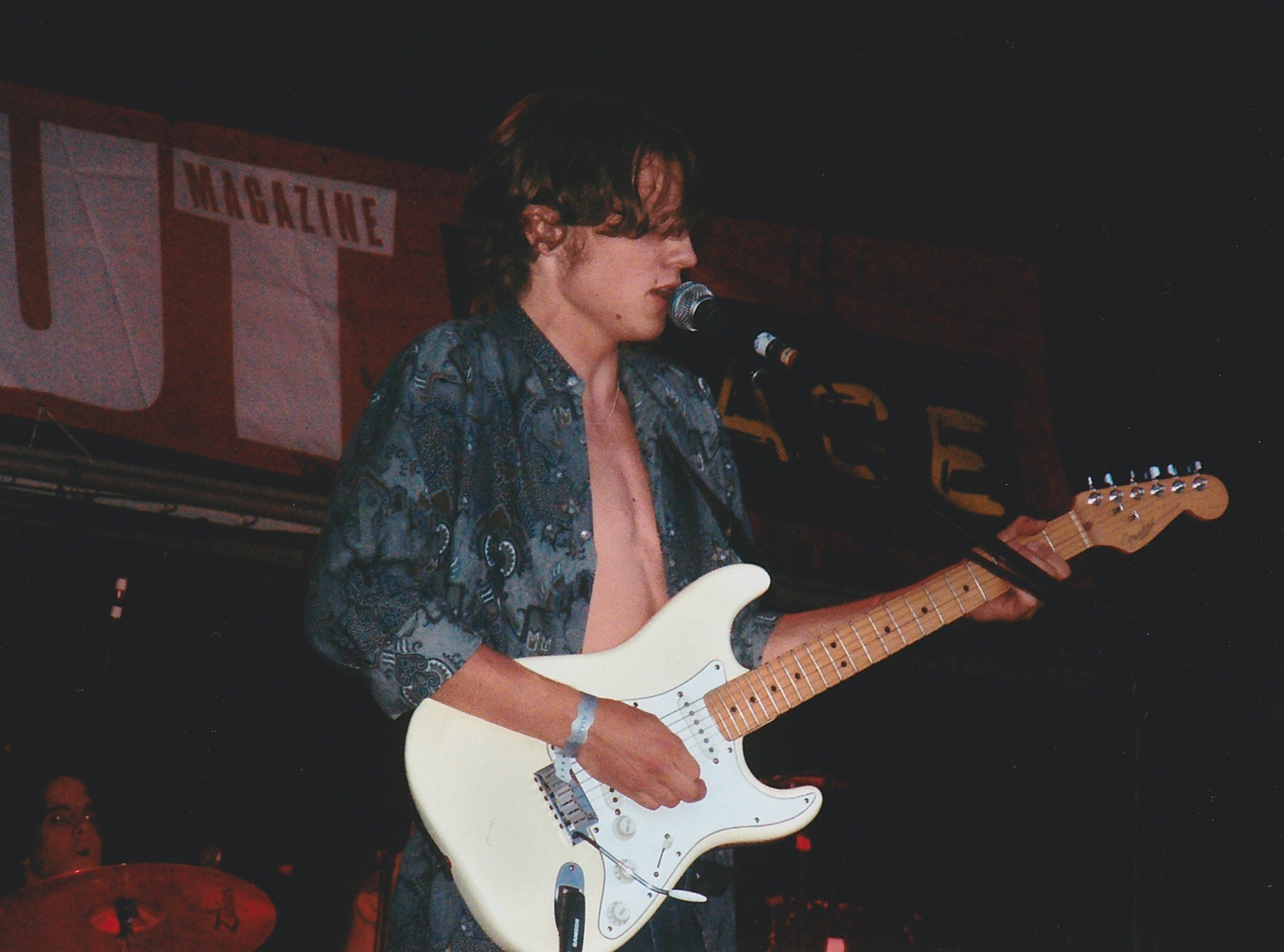

Background information
- Origin: Wiltshire, England
- Genres: Indie rock
- Years active: 2002–2010 (hiatus)
- Label: Independiente
- Members: Joe Taylor; Sam Nadel; Adam Newton

Blackbud are an English indie rock band from Wiltshire, comprising Joe Taylor (guitar, vocals), Adam Newton (bass, backing vocals) and Sam Nadel (drums, backing vocals). Blackbud have been compared to artists such as Jeff Buckley, Radiohead and Led Zeppelin, and have toured extensively, to critical acclaim, having attracted the attention of Jimmy Page, Michael Eavis and Steve Lamacq, amongst other noteworthy people. In January 2010, the band entered an indefinite hiatus.

The band's debut album, From The Sky, was released on 31 July 2006, while their self-titled second album, Blackbud was released on 8 June 2009, with digital-only single "You Can Run" preceding it by one week.

== History ==
=== Formation ===
The band met at St Laurence School in their hometown of Bradford on Avon, Wiltshire. Having discovered they had the same musical interests, Taylor, Nadel, and Newton formed Blackbud in December 2002. The name, amongst many various interpretations, probably being derived from the bud of a plant/flower. Blackbud began as a covers band, and secured a residency at a local pub. They would mainly play sets comprising covers of songs by Jimi Hendrix, Bob Marley and Stevie Ray Vaughan. As time went on, Taylor began writing his own songs and three demo CDs were recorded during the band's first 18 months.

=== Recording contract ===
In 2005, Blackbud signed to Independiente Records, a British independent record label whose roster included Gomez, Travis and Embrace. The deal came after several major labels showed a considerable amount of interest in the band. After much deliberation, the band concluded that an independent would best suit their ethos. This record deal was a result of coming Joint First in the Glastonbury 2004 Unsigned bands competition.

=== Self-titled album (2009) and hiatus ===
In 2009, the band released their second studio album, Blackbud.

In January 2010, the band entered an indefinite hiatus, stating:

After a long period of radio silence it's about time we got you up-to-date. Needles to say the band has been a huge part of our existence for over seven years, but since the end of our tour in June 2009 we've found ourselves concentrating on separate musical projects. We've decided that although we don't feel the band is over, some time off to concentrate on new things is certainly called for. Despite that we still have some guitar amps and an irrepressible love for west country pubs so who knows, maybe sometime in the not so close future we'll get back to what we do be best. [...] Most importantly a big thank you to everyone whose helped us with the immense job of running this band over the years, you know who you are. So not goodbye, but we bid you adieu for the time being at least.

In December 2012, Joe Taylor hinted on the band's YouTube page that they will "hopefully be recording new material soon".

== Discography ==
=== Studio albums ===
- From the Sky (2006)
- Blackbud (2009)

=== EPs and singles ===
- The Livewire EP (2005)
- "Heartbeat" (2005)
- "Barefoot Dancing" (2006)
- "Forever" (2006)
- "You Can Run" (2009)

== Song appearances ==
"Barefoot Dancing" appeared on The Skeleton Key soundtrack.

== Members ==
- Joe Taylor - guitar, vocals
- Sam Nadel - drums, backing vocals
- Adam Newton - bass, backing vocals
