= Alloy Mental =

Electro-punk music group from Belfast

- Origin: Belfast
- Years active: 2005-2008
- Label: Skint
- Members: Martin Corrigan, Danny Todd, Phil Kieran

Alloy Mental is an electro-punk music group from Belfast, Northern Ireland. Signed to Skint Records, the band was mainly active from 2005 to 2008 and achieved hits on the UK dance chart.

== History ==
Martin Corrigan and Danny Todd, from Ulster, had been in the rock group Corrigan, which split up in 2004. They then teamed up with fellow Belfast based techno music producer Phil Kieran in c. 2005 to form the electro punk group Alloy Mental. They released their first single, eponymously titled "Alloy Mental", in 2005 on Skint Records, which peaked at number 13 on the UK dance chart and was reviewed in DMC World magazine as "much peak time dance floor, as it is show stopper in the mosh pit". Follow up single "Gotta Love" peaked at number 27 in the same chart. The band released their debut album, We Have Control, in 2007. Critically well received by the music press, Stuart Bailie of the BBC concluded his review by stating "it's an inspired melding of Ulster rage, global electronics, adventure and fierce humour. Alloy Mental have fetched something unique from the smithy of their soul".

Alloy Mental have appeared on BBC Radio 1, including performing an Essential Mix in 2007, have supported New Order, and played live at festivals including T in the Park and Glastonbury.

== Members ==
- Martin Corrigan (vocals)
- Danny Todd (guitar)
- Phil Kieran (turntable)

== Discography ==
Singles
Title	Year	Peak UK dance
"Alloy Mental"	2005	13
"Gotta Love"	2005	27
"God Is Green"	2007	
"I Am"	2008	

Albums
Title	Year	Peak UK dance
We Have Control (BRASSIC39CD)	2007	9
