= From the Sky (album) =

Studio album by Blackbud
- Released: 31 July 2006
- Genre: Indie rock, blues
- Length: 47:51
- Label: Independiente
- Producer: David Bottrill

Blackbud chronology
From the Sky (2006)	Blackbud (2009)

Professional ratings
Review scores
Source	Rating
Drowned in Sound	5/10
The Guardian	2/5 stars

From The Sky is the debut studio album by British rock band Blackbud, released on 31 July 2006 on Independiente.

== Track listing ==
1. Barefoot Dancing
2. 1:5:8
3. Switch
4. Heartbeat
5. Goodbye Song (Cold Haroundan)
6. Steal Away
7. Sitting By the River
8. Forever
9. Alone
10. Days Passing Away
11. Market Streets (includes hidden track)

== Personnel ==
Blackbud

- Joe Taylor – guitars, vocals, organ
- Sam Nadel – drums, percussion, backing vocals
- Adam Newton – bass, backing vocals, melodica

Additional personnel

- Marie Berard – violin
- Annalee Patipatanakoon – viola
- Steve Dan – viola
- Roman Borys – cello
- Lou Pomanti – keyboards
