= Fonda Rae =

American singer

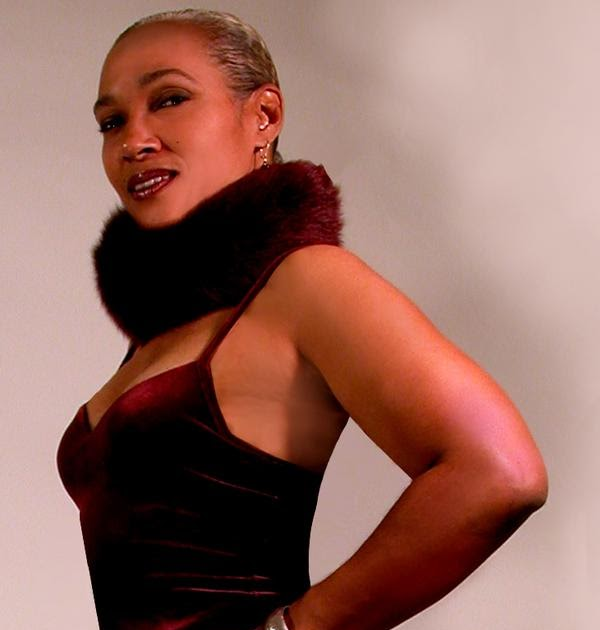

Background information
- Born: Ossining, New York, U.S.
- Origin: United States
- Genres: R&B, jazz, funk, dance
- Occupation: Singer
- Instrument: Vocals
- Years active: 1982–present
- Labels: Posse Records, Streetwave Digital Jukebox Records
- Website: www.fondarae.com

Fonda Rae is an American R&B singer best known for her club hits like "Over Like a Fat Rat" and "Touch Me" (the latter of which was later covered by Cathy Dennis). She has also worked with artists such as Don Armando, Kid Creole and the Coconuts, Taka Boom, The Fat Boys and Debbie Harry.

== Discography ==
=== Singles ===
Year	Title	Chart positions		
Year	Title	US Club Play	US R&B	UK
1982	"Over Like a Fat Rat"	22	75	—
1983	"Heobah"	19	—	—
1984	"Touch Me"	5	70	49
1996	"Living in Ecstasy"	7	—	—
2016	"Think About You"	—	—	—
2018	"Searchin'"	—	—	—
"—" denotes releases that did not chart.

Grand Puba's song "Fat Rat" was based on "Over Like a Fat Rat".
