= General Midi (DJ) =

British DJ

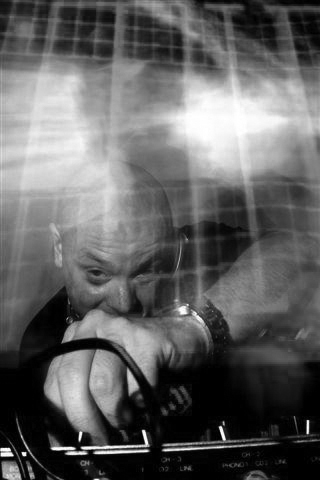

Background information
- Born: Paul Damian Crossman
- Origin: London, England
- Genres: Breakbeat
- Labels: TCR, DJ Hyper
- Members: Paul Crossman; Al Watson
- Past members: Al Jones
- Website: generalmidi.co.uk

General Midi (born Paul Damian Crossman) is an English breakbeat DJ. In an undated online interview, Crossman named Al Watson as a writing partner and engineer, who also works with him in the duo Starecase.

General Midi has released several singles on breaks labels including TCR and DJ Hyper. He released his debut album titled Midi Style on Distinct'ive Records in October 2005, and a follow-up, Operation Overdrive in 2009.

General Midi provided an hour-long guest mix and accompanying interview for Annie Nightingale's late night breaks show during the promotion of Operation Overdrive in 2009. During the interview, Annie and General Midi discussed the use of non-sampled specifically recorded vocals used throughout Operation Overdrive (this being a rare feature in breakbeat music at the time).

General Midi has received considerable play on Pandora Radio, where he is noted as having 31,000 listeners and 16 albums.

Paul Crossman formerly worked as a secondary school computer science teacher at Teddington School after stopping DJing. After working at Teddington School Paul Crossman was also a former secondary teacher at Lampton School.
