= Chikinki =

English electropop band

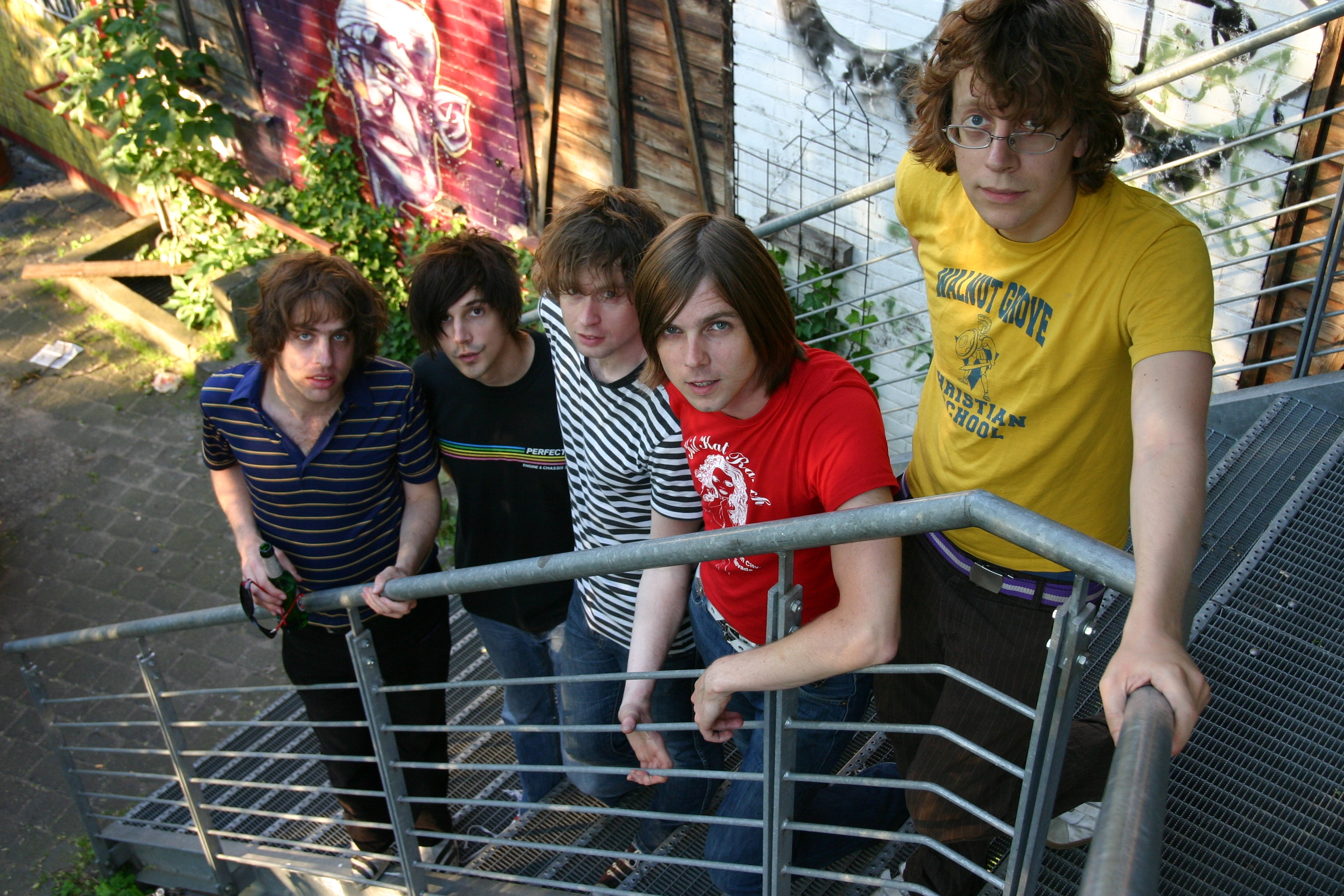
- Chikinki (l–r): Rupert Browne, Steve Bond, Ed East, Trevor Wensley, Boris Exton

Background information
- Origin: Bristol, England
- Genres: Electropop
- Years active: 1996–present
- Labels: Urban Cow
- Members: Rupert Browne; Steve Bond; Ed East; Trevor Wensley; Boris Exton
- Past members: Frank; Luke Sherwood
- Website: Official website

Chikinki are an English electropop band from Bristol, England.

== History ==
The band formed at Hiatt Baker Hall at the University of Bristol in 1996. Originally there were six members: Rupert Browne (vocals), Ed East (rhythm guitar), Steve Bond (drums), Simon (Boris) Exton (keyboards), Luke Sherwood (lead guitar) and Trevor Wensley (saxophone). After Sherwood left the band, Wensley became a second keyboard/synth player. As there was no bass player the two keyboards shared rhythm, bass and melody duties. All five members write the songs. An early EP, Telephone Heroes, was followed by their debut album, Experiment with Mother. Recorded at home, it was released by Bristol Label Sink and Stove Records along with the single "Like It or Leave It". Having gigged regularly for many years around Bristol, they began to play further a-field. This led to them acquiring management and subsequently signing a deal with Island Records. The band recorded the album Lick Your Ticket in 2003 with producer Steve Osborne at Realworld Studios. They released a number of singles from it and toured extensively, playing with bands such as Kasabian (other than in Southampton), the Kaiser Chiefs and The Charlatans as well as at Glastonbury and V festivals. However, they were unable to sell enough records to make a sufficient return on the large investment Island had made in them and their contract was not extended to another album.

Whilst working in Berlin with dance producers Tiefschwarz they were seen performing by Kitty-Yo Records who signed the album up for release in GAS. Their next album, Brace, Brace was licensed by Weekender among other labels. Produced by Bruno Ellingham this album featured the single, "You Said" which enjoyed airplay and allowed the band to play a large number of gigs across Europe. Their most recent album, Bitten (2011), was written and recorded at Studio East in Berlin; a studio run by their guitarist East. Funded by BMG Rights and distributed by Rough Trade it featured the single "Bitte Bitte".

== Discography ==
=== Albums ===
- Experiment with Mother (2001), Sink and Stove Records
- Lick Your Ticket, (2004), Kitty-Yo/Universal, UK #184
- The Balloon Factory (2006), Urban Cow Records
- Brace, Brace (2007), Weekender Records
- Bitten (2011), Urban Cow

=== Singles and EPs ===
- "Telephone Heroes" (Urban Cow Records) - July 2000
- "Like It Or Leave It" (Sink and Stove Records) - March 2002
- "Time" (Fierce Panda Records) - March 2003, UK #194
- "Hate TV" (Island Records) - August 2003, UK #97
- "Assassinator 13" (Island Records) - November 2003, UK #72
- "Like It Or Leave It" (Island Records) - March 2004, UK #65
- "Ether Radio" (Island Records) - June 2004, UK #50
- "All Eyes" (Island Records) - October 2004, UK #74
- "You Said" (Urban Cow Records) - May 2006
- "Bitte Bitte" (Urban Cow Records) - March 2011
