= Simon Shackleton =

- Also known as: Elite Force; Zodiac Cartel; Killer Elite; Futurecore; Double Black; pHrack R; Synchromesh
- Born: 1968 (age 57–58)
- Origin: Dartford, Kent, England
- Genre: Electronic
- Occupations: Music producer, composer, DJ, vocalist
- Instruments: Vocals, guitars, keyboards, piano, synthesizers, samplers, oboe, programming
- Years active: 1990s–present
- Labels: Stereophoenix, U&A Recordings, Fused & Bruised
- Website: www.simonshackleton.org

Simon Shackleton is an English electronic music producer, composer, DJ, and performer. His music has appeared in films such as The Matrix, Arlington Road, Charlie's Angels, Titan A.E. and The Jackal, as well as in video games including MotorStorm, FIFA 2000, and Need for Speed: High Stakes.

Since 1996, Shackleton has produced and performed under aliases including "Elite Force", and received several awards including a 2011 Beatport Award for the highest selling breakbeat track of the year. In the same year, he won two International Breakbeat Awards (Breakspoll Awards) for Best Producer and Best Label (U&A Recordings). He previously ran the Fused & Bruised label (1996–2002), and has been described as a leading proponent of the Tech-Funk movement, which merges elements of house, electro, and breakbeat.

In the 2010s, he gained a reputation for extended DJ sets through his "One Series" events in the US and UK.

== Recent work and The Shadowmaker ==
In 2025, he released the album The Shadowmaker. Drawing on influences such as Radiohead, Portishead, Nine Inch Nails, and Max Richter, the album marked a shift away from club music toward introspective and cinematic compositions.

The Shadowmaker was accompanied by a live multimedia performance co-created with filmmaker Chele Gutek. The show premiered at MCA Denver's Holiday Theater in February 2025 and was described as a "living documentary" blending live music, visual storytelling, archival footage, and cinematic sound design.

== Discography ==
=== As Simon Shackleton ===
- Piece of Me (2016)
- Midnite Sessions EP (2020)
- Sjálf EP (2021)
- Constellations EP (2021)
- The Shadowmaker (2025)

=== As Elite Force ===
- No Turning Back (2003)
- Modern:Primitive (2006)
- Revamped (2010)
- Shockland (2011)
- RVMPD2 (2012)
- RVMPD3 (2013)
- Music For Recers (2021)
- Nipped & Tucked - Volume one (2024)
- Next Life - Meat Katie ft. Ithaka [Elite Force remix] (2002)

=== As Zodiac Cartel ===
- Multiple singles released on U&A Recordings (2007–2013)
- Remixes for Moby, DJ Dan, Franz Ferdinand, Santigold, Lee Coombs, Rennie Pilgrem, Fukkk Offf, Calvertron, Tai, and Elite Force

=== As Lunatic Calm ===
- Metropol (1997, MCA Records)
- Breaking Point (2002, City of Angels)

=== As Flicker Noise ===
- Information is Power EP (1995, Concrete Records)
- Mirrorman EP (1995, MCA Records)

=== Compilation / notable inclusions ===
- "Leave You Far Behind" featured in films including The Matrix, Charlie's Angels, The Jackal, and Titan A.E.
- Tracks featured in video games including FIFA 2000, MotorStorm, and Need for Speed: High Stakes
- Remixes featured on Community Service and Community Service II by The Crystal Method
