= Breakspoll Awards =

Annual music awards in Britain

- Location: London, Manchester
- Country: United Kingdom
- First award: 2001; 25 years ago
- Website: www.breakspoll.com

Breakspoll is an international celebration of breakbeat music. Launched in 2001 as an online poll for breakbeat fans, it grew into an event that honours the scene's leading DJs, producers, events, and more.

The Breakspoll awards ceremony and after-party have been hosted at several prominent UK's nightclubs, including; Electrowerkz, Egg London, Fabric (club), Matter, Herbal, Fire, and Cable.

Additionally, Breakspoll has also toured internationally, with events at the Palacio Municipal de Deportes San Pablo (Seville, Spain), Winter Music Conference (Miami). In addition, it has filled arenas at Glade Festival at Matterley Bowl and Crooked Sounds at Clapham Common.

== 2013 (hosted at Cable, London Bridge) ==
- Best Track - Lady Waks feat MC Manic - 'Round The Globe' [Menu Music]
- Best Remix - Planet Perfecto Knights - 'ResuRection' (Beatman & Ludmilla Remix) [Perfecto Records]
- Best Album - Krafty Kuts - Lets Ride
- Best Label - Ayra Recordings
- Best New Label - Scour Records
- Best Producer - Lady Waks
- Breakthrough Producer - Broken Eye
- Best DJ - A Skillz
- Breakthrough DJ - Se7en Deadly Breaks
- Best Large Event - Boomtown (festival) (UK)
- Best Small Event - Lowdown & Dirty (UK)
- Best Website/Blog - NuSkoolBreaks.co.uk
- Best Radio Station - NSB Radio
- Best Radio Show - Lady Waks Show (Radio Record)
- Best Free Track - The Prodigy - 'Smack My Bitch Up' (REL1 *Re-filth)
- Best Live Act - Dub Pistols
- Outstanding Contribution - Sonia Akow

== 2014 (hosted at Fire, Vauxhall) ==
- Best Track: Marten Hørger - 'LGFU' (Instant Vibes)
- Best Remix: Slamboree - 'Cheeky Peepers (Deekline Remix)' (Rat Records)
- Best Album: Stanton Warriors - 'Stanton Sessions Vol 4' (Grand Central)
- Best Label: Ghetto Funk
- Best New Label: Sub Element Recordings
- Best Producer: Marten Hørger
- Best New Producer: Evan Gamble Lewis
- Best DJ: Lady Waks
- Best New DJ: Breaksjunky
- Best Large Event: Boomtown Festival UK
- Best Small Event: Lowdown & Dirty
- Best Radio Station: NSB Radio
- Best Website/Blog: NuSkoolBreaks.co.uk
- Best Radio Show: Redemption Bass with Breaksjunky (NSB Radio)
- Best Free Track: Uncle Louie - 'Full Tilt Boogie (Slynk & Stickybuds Remix)'
- Best Live Act: Slamboree
- Outstanding Contribution: Deekline
