= Rennie Pilgrem =

English electronic music producer

Rennie Pilgrem is an English electronic music producer. He is often considered responsible for the creation of the nu skool breaks genre. Before moving into breaks, Pilgrem was part of the influential rave group Rhythm Section along with Richie T, Ellis Dee and Nick Newton. Pilgrem is also the boss of Thursday Club Recordings a.k.a. TCR, a label which he founded in 1993, which has released material by B.L.I.M., Koma & Bones, Chris Carter, 2Sinners, Vigi, JDS, General Midi, Arthur Baker, Dopamine, Elite Force, Überzone and Meat Katie.

Since 2010, he switched his focus to visual art. In 2013, he was selected for the Royal Academy Summer exhibition. He now devotes his time making paintings, original prints and uses his previous electronic experience to crest cutting-edge digital work too. He has shown his work with The Other Art Fair in London and is also working with galleries both in England and abroad.
