= Meat Katie =

English electronic musician

- Born: Mark Pember; United Kingdom
- Origin: United Kingdom
- Genres: Breakbeat, tech-funk, techno, tribal, hip hop, breakbeat, House music
- Occupations: Electronic musician, producer
- Years active: 1998–present
- Labels: Kingsize, Lot49

Mark Pember, also known as Meat Katie, is an English electronic musician. He creates music making hybrid sounds by combining several genres of music; tech-funk, techno, tribal, hip hop, breakbeat and house music. Several of his releases appeared on Kingsize Records during the late nineties and early 2000s. He currently owns, manages and records for the label LOT49 along with Dylan Rhymes. The label's artists include Dopamine, Kid Blue, Vandal, Odissi, Elite Force, and Lee Coombs. Meat Katie was awarded the Outstanding Contribution to Breakbeat award at the 2006 Breakspoll Awards.

== Discography ==
- Off the Bone (1998)
- Long to Belong (2001)
- Vibrator (2006)
- Next Life (2016) – featuring Ithaka (lyrics/vocals by: Ithaka Darin Pappas) – Album: Back in the Day / Lowering The Tone Records [UK]

=== Compilations ===
- Destination Australia '02 (2003)
- Bedrock Breaks (2004)
- Beyond the Darkness (2002)
- FabricLive.21 (2005)
- Ministry of Sound Presents Sessions: Vol. 8.1 (2008)
