= Glastonbury Festival 2009 =

Music festival in Somerset, England

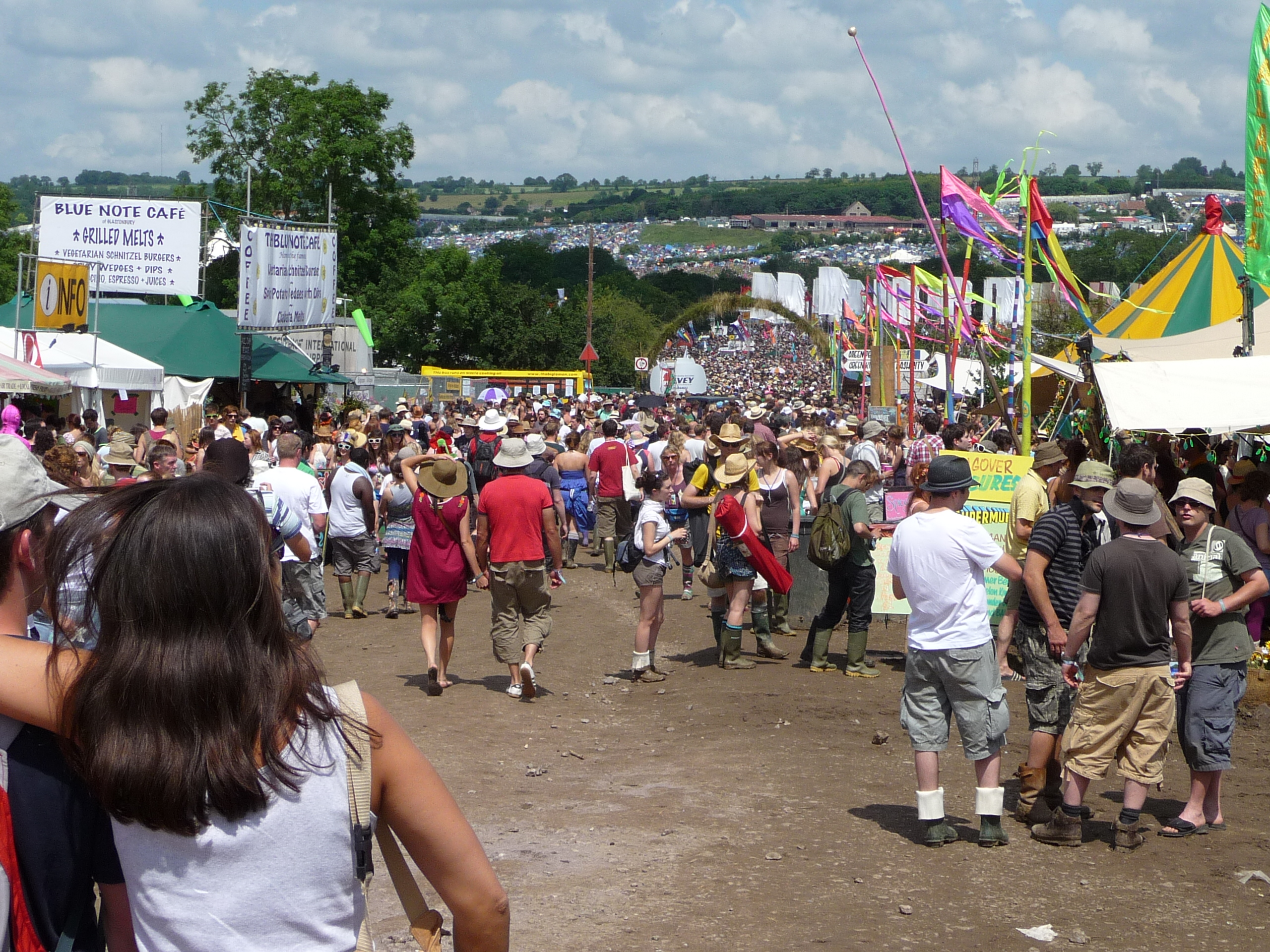
- Crowds heading from the Greenfields to Jazz World
- Date: 24 June 2009 – 29 June 2009
- Locations: Worthy Farm, Pilton, Somerset, England
- Previous event: Glastonbury Festival 2008
- Next event: Glastonbury Festival 2010
- Participants: Neil Young, Bruce Springsteen, Blur

The 2009 Glastonbury Festival/Glastonbury Festival of Contemporary Performing Arts was held from 24 to 29 June 2009.

== Tickets ==
The 2009 wristband

=== Registration ===
In a similar way to previous festivals, tickets for the 2009 event required pre-registration (of a photograph and personal details) through the festival website. Registration opened on 1 September 2008.

=== Sales ===
Tickets were able to be purchased via the See Tickets website or by telephone. A limited number of tickets were available by promotion through the Western Daily Press and competitions run by Greenpeace, eFestivals and The Guardian.

Ticket lines opened on the morning of 5 October 2008, and customers were able to place deposits for tickets (£50) or buy them in full (£175). Tickets required full payment by 1 February 2009.

On 22 January 2009, at Midem 2009, Michael Eavis announced that 90% of the event's 137,500 tickets had been sold. He also stated that although headliners had not been confirmed, he was awaiting confirmation from the acts he had approached.

==== Re-sale ====
Reserved tickets which did not have their remaining balance paid by the deadline were put back on sale on 2 February 2009 and it was announced the next day that the event had sold out, with the majority of reservations being balanced by 1 February deadline. A re-sale of cancelled tickets was held on 5 April 2009 at 9:00 am. These tickets sold out by 10:15 am.

== Festival site ==
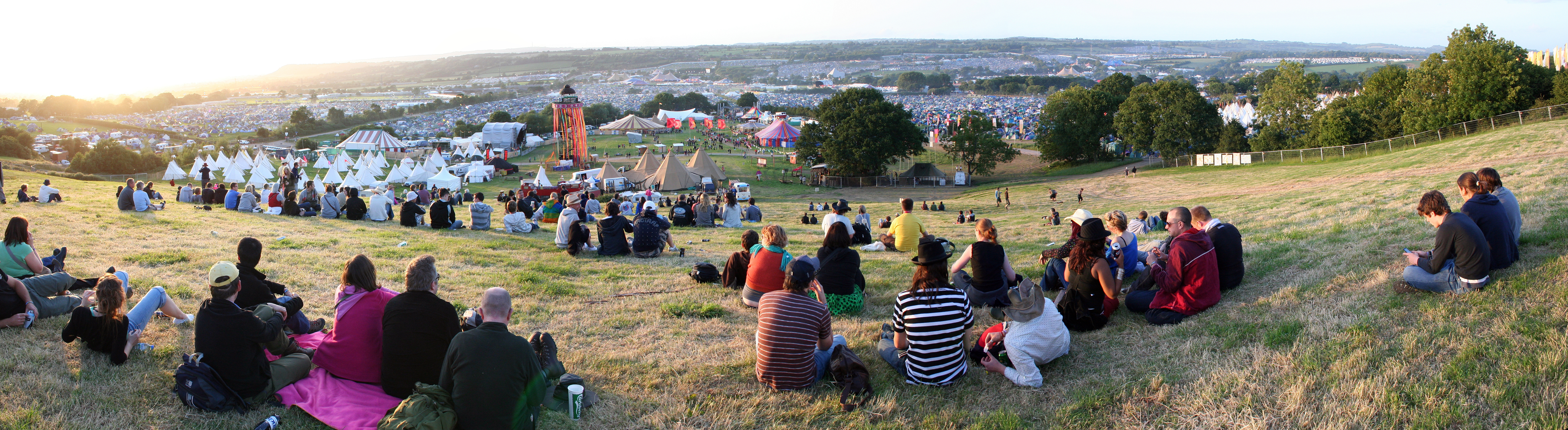
View over the Glastonbury Festival, 2009

=== Arenas ===
In a December 2008 interview, co-organiser Emily Eavis stated that the Trash City arena would be expanded for the 2009 festival. On 5 December 2008, Battersea and Wandsworth TUC announced that the Left Field tent of the site would not be a part of the 2009 event. A new area, named William's Green, occupied the same area.

The 2009 event saw expansion of the Dance Village – including a 3D disco – as well as the return of the G-Stage and the Pussy Parlure. Greenpeace used their area in the Green Fields to create an airport terminal building and miniature replica of the village of Sipson, which is threatened by the expansion of London Heathrow Airport.

=== Camping ===
As with previous events, the festival had a tipi field where six people can accommodate one tipi for the shared price of £800. A new hospitality area, surrounded by a 12 feet (3.7 m) wall, was created on the old cinema field between Lower Mead and Wicker Ground fields. This area included PodPad camping. The positioning of this area restricted pedestrian access to both camping and parking sites; pathways at previous festivals have led through this area.

== Line up ==
The three main headline acts (Neil Young, Bruce Springsteen & the E Street Band and Blur) were announced in March 2009, with the full line up being released on 25 May 2009.

=== Stages 1 to 11 ===
Pyramid Stage
Friday 26 June	Saturday 27 June	Sunday 28 June
Neil Young; The Specials; Lily Allen; Fleet Foxes; N*E*R*D; Regina Spektor; Gabriella Cilmi; Björn Again	Bruce Springsteen & the E Street Band; Kasabian; Crosby, Stills and Nash; Dizzee Rascal; Spinal Tap; Eagles of Death Metal; Tinariwen; V V Brown	Blur; Nick Cave and the Bad Seeds; Madness; Tom Jones; Amadou & Mariam; Tony Christie; Status Quo; Easy Star All-Stars

Other Stage
Friday 26 June	Saturday 27 June	Sunday 28 June
Bloc Party; The Ting Tings; Lady Gaga; Friendly Fires; White Lies; The View; The Maccabees; The Rakes; The Whip; Mr Hudson	Franz Ferdinand; Pendulum; Maxïmo Park; Paolo Nutini; Pete Doherty; The Script; Jason Mraz; Metric; Peter Bjorn and John; The Broken Family Band	The Prodigy; Glasvegas; Bon Iver; Bat for Lashes; Yeah Yeah Yeahs; Enter Shikari; Brand New; Art Brut; The Boxer Rebellion; In Case of Fire

Jazz World
Friday 26 June	Saturday 27 June	Sunday 28 June
Q-Tip; The Streets; Steel Pulse; Lamb; Hot 8 Brass Band; Stephanie McKay	Playing for Change; Baaba Maal; Lonnie Liston Smith; Jamie Cullum; Rokia Traoré; Erik Truffaz; Rolf Harris	The Black Eyed Peas; Manu Dibango; Roots Manuva; Khaled; Orquesta Aragón; Linda Lewis

John Peel Stage
Friday 26 June	Saturday 27 June	Sunday 28 June
Doves; Jamie T Jack Peñate; Little Boots; Metronomy; V V Brown; The Virgins; Fucked Up; The Rumble Strips; Dan Black; General Fiasco	Jarvis Cocker; White Lies; Florence and the Machine; Passion Pit; The Gaslight Anthem; Hockey; The Temper Trap; Esser; The Big Pink; Baddies; The Nightingales	Echo & the Bunnymen; The Wombats; Noisettes; Ladyhawke; The Soft Pack; Just Jack; Emmy the Great; Twisted Wheel; We Have Band; Wave Machines; GoodBooks

Acoustic Stage
Friday 26 June	Saturday 27 June	Sunday 28 June
Ray Davies; Fairport Convention; Jason Mraz; Scott Matthews; No Crows; Hugh Cornwell; Ben Taylor; Sean Taylor; Alyssa Bonagura; John Smith	Kilfenora Céilí Band; Tindersticks; Newton Faulkner; Lisa Hannigan; Gary Louris and Mark Olson; Lúnasa; Bap Kennedy; Hope&Social; Stornoway; Cora Smyth Band	Georgie Fame; Roger McGuinn; Sharon Corr; London Community Gospel Choir; Beth Rowley; Imelda May; Penguin Cafe Orchestra; Kate Walsh; Martin Harley Band; Lucy Wainwright Roche

Park Stage
Friday 26 June	Saturday 27 June	Sunday 28 June
Animal Collective; The Horrors; Noah and the Whale; The Dead Weather; Emilíana Torrini; The Hotrats; James Hunter; Golden Silvers; Bishi; Lay Low; Super Furry Animals(Secret Set)	Bon Iver; M. Ward; Klaxons; Shlomo (and Guests); Horace Andy; Easy Star All-Stars; The Memory Band; Bombay Bicycle Club; The Low Anthem; First Aid Kit	Seun Kuti and Fela's Egypt 80; Cold War Kids; Tunng and Tinariwen; Alela Diane; Terry Reid; The Rockingbirds; Alberta Cross; Chief; Micachu and the Shapes; WaterAid Choir

The Queen's Head
Friday 26 June	Saturday 27 June	Sunday 28 June
The Glitterati; Jason Mraz; The Big Pink; The Rakes; The Rumble Strips; The Virgins dan le sac vs Scroobius Pip; Tommy Sparks; The Low Anthem; Team Waterpolo; Hope&Social; Dead Like Harry; Yr Ods; City Stereo; The Mojo Fins; Maura Kincaid; The Slips; Sub Universe	The Guilty Pleasures; Dan Black; The King Blues; The Shortwave Set; The Wombats; Official Secrets Act; Noah and the Whale; Emmy the Great; Broken Records; Peggy Sue and the Pirates; Marina and the Diamonds; Theoretical Girl; Blue Roses	Motown 50th Birthday; Robyn Hitchcock; The Aliens; The Magic Numbers; Bombay Bicycle Club; Joe Gideon and the Shark; Vagabond; Joe Lean and the Jing Jang Jong; Fight Like Apes; The Capitol Years; Soft Toy Emergency; Priscilla Ahn; Jersey Budd; Two Door Cinema Club; Major Major

East Dance
Friday 26 June	Saturday 27 June	Sunday 28 June
David Guetta; Layo & Bushwacka! Easy Star All-Stars; Iration Steppas ft Mark Iration; Dreadzone; Tom Middleton; The Egg; Paul Woolford; Pama International	2ManyDJs; Deadmau5; Pete Tong; La Roux; Wiley; Tinchy Stryder; Eric Prydz; Heartbreak; We Have Band	Calvin Harris; Mr. Scruff; V V Brown; Rob da Bank; Frankmusik; Wonky Pop DJs; Kissy Sell Out; Wonky Pop DJs; Ou Est; Chris Coco

West Dance
Friday 26 June	Saturday 27 June	Sunday 28 June
Erol Alkan; Crookers; The Whip; Annie Mac; Skream And Benga; WhoMadeWho; Joe Goddard (Hot Chip); DeepGroove; Nathan Detroit	Josh Wink; DJ Yoda; DJ Food; The Qemists; Timo Maas; The Japanese Popstars; Hudson Mohawke; NAPT; Emperors Machine; Jam the Channel	Peaches; Jodie Harsh; Beat Torrent; Freq Nasty; Dirty Vegas; Quiver; Filthy Dukes; Don Diablo; Goldfish; Stuart Wilkinson; Transformer

Avalon
Friday 26 June	Saturday 27 June	Sunday 28 June
The Blockheads; British Sea Power with Orkestra del Sol; Michael McGoldrick, Iain Fletcher & Andy Dinan; The Puppini Sisters; 3 Daft Monkeys; Baskery; The Mandibles	The Wonder Stuff; Edward II; Eliza Carthy; Badly Drawn Boy; Solas; The King Blues; The Lancashire Hotpots; Wheeler Street; The Martin Harley Band	The Peatbog Faeries; Seth Lakeman; Dodgy; Will Young; Glenn Tilbrook; The Mummers; The Destroyers; 6 Day Riot; Stornoway

The Glade
Friday 26 June	Saturday 27 June	Sunday 28 June
Tom Real; Beardyman with The Bays; James Monro; Banco de Gaia; Pathaan; Outmode; Mum Suleiman; Clive Craske	Stereo MCs; Stanton Warriors; DJ Fresh; Dub Pistols; Don Letts; Dr Meaker; Tayo; Rusko; Sancho Panza; Nairobi; Jinx	Gong; Steve Hillage Band; Eat Static; Richard 'Kid' Strange and the Party; Second Class Citizen; Back to the Planet; 3 Daft Monkeys; Hybrid Cinematic Set; Breakfast with Howard Marks

=== Stages 12 to 20 ===
Croissant Neuf
Friday 26 June	Saturday 27 June	Sunday 28 June
The Communicators; The Destroyers; The Travelling Band; Steve Knightley; Paolo Nutini; The Boat Band; King G Mall & The Dhol Blasters	Bliss Club Night feat Chew Lips; Bowjangles; The Mandibles & Mandiblettes; Mankala; The Hit Ups	Gong; Steve Hillage Band; Eatstatic; Richard 'Kid' Strange and the Party; Second Class Citizen; Back to the Planet; 3 Daft Monkeys; Hybrid Cinematic Set; Breakfast with Howard Marks

Club Dada
Friday 26 June	Saturday 27 June	Sunday 28 June
DJ Head Gardener; Warlords Of Pez; Blackberry Wood; The Dynamics; Lady Gaga; The Delegators; DJ Head Gardener; Dj Tall Will; Lazy Habits; Bobby Mcghees; Ruth Theodore; The Long Notes; Katy Carr; Rún	DJ Jason Mayall; Fat 45; DJ Jason Mayall; Africa Express Soundsystem; Aerial Act and Nathan; FluteBox Lee; Hypnotic Brass Ensemble (Chicago); No 1 Station; Killa Dilla; Peyoti For President; Yes Sir Boss!!! Heavy Load; Jamie Renton (Chilli Fried); Al Cool and The Stranger Wines; Spaceships Are Cool; DJ Chinaman & Deaf Rave	DJ Tofowski; Polka Madre; Les Fanfare Petard; Orkestra Del Sol; Trans-Siberian March Band; Le Vagabond Boogaloo Club; Jah Free and friends Monty Casino; Tarantism; Kim Lone; Dj Lee

The Rabbit Hole
Friday 26 June	Saturday 27 June	Sunday 28 June
Secret Open Mic...til 6am Dogshow; Dubblehead; The Mike Strutter Band; Open Mic; Jamie Burke; Open Mic; The Rusticles; Evi Vine; Bryony Fry; Aimee Ballinger; James Watson; Open Mic; Hamish Guerrini and Brothers	Secret Open Mic...til 6am C.C.Q. The Clever Bar-Stewards; Jump Mama; The Lancashire Hotpots; Madelaine Hart; Kev Christmas; Open Mic; Wandering Word Extravaganza & Friends; Open Mic; The Hocky-Smiths	Egstremely Special Supergroup (gleaned from all over site) til 6am The Mad Cows dubious Open Mic; Cromwell's League; The Bad Hatters and Scantily Clad; Jesca Hoop; Tom Hickox; Perhaps Contraption; Eat More Cake; Hana; White Rabbit's Records

Guardian Lounge
Friday 26 June	Saturday 27 June	Sunday 28 June
The Maccabees; DJ - Crazy P DJ or Bonar 2020; Crazy P DJ – Bonar; Little Boots; DJ - Horsemeat Disco; Ebony Bones; DJ - The Unabombers; Slow Club; DJ – Thecocknbull Kid; Bombay Bicycle Club; DJ – Michael Cook; The Memory Band; DJ – Michael Cook	Peter, Bjorn & John; DJ – Richard Norris (Time & Space Machine); Golden Silvers; DJ – Erol Alkin / Beyond The Wizards Sleeve; Micachu & The Shapes; DJ – Johnno Burgess; The Invisible; Totally Enormous Extinct Dinosaurs; DJ – Greco Roman Sound System featuring… Emmy The Great; DJ – Greco Roman Sound System (feat. Joe Hot Chip); Speech Debelle; The Big Pink; Blue Roses; DJ – Michael Cook	Tony Christie; DJ – Coco Disco; Heartbreak; DJ – Red Rack'em; Boy Crisis; DJ – Frank Tope & Dan; We Have Band; Special Guest; DJ – Cosmic Disco; Amadou & Mariam; DJ – Heavenly JukeBox; White Lies; DJ Heavenly JukeBox; Music From The Penguin Cafe; DJ – Cosmic Disco

The Bandstand
Friday 26 June	Saturday 27 June	Sunday 28 June
Rhythmites; Tragic Roundabout; The Cedar; Malarchy; Vladimir Steamboat; Lunaloop; Biggles Wartime Band; The Kays Lavelle; The Gents; Little Musgraves; Master Duncan's Poetry Hour (Not); Will Scott & Jan Bell; Ash Mandrake; Mike Harper	Kava Kava; Gringo Ska; Morph; Carmina; Urusen; Sweet Billy Pilgrim; Who's Afear'd; Bowjangles; Mik Artistik; Poppy & Friends; Master Duncan's Poetry Hour (Not); Ruby Brown; Swamp Donkey; The Cloghoppers	Babel; The Duckworths; RSVP; Loop Force; ShakShak; Polly and the Billets Doux; Tom Kitching & Gren Bartley; Bethia Beadman; Inflatable Buddha; The Gala Band; Master Duncan's Poetry Hour (Not); Adam & Lydia; Spring; Ian Perry; Bashema

Stonebridge Bar
Friday 26 June	Saturday 27 June	Sunday 28 June
Four Tet; Little Boots (DJ set); Tas Elias; Dadrock; Bullion; Hip Hop Karaoke; Justin Steele; The Endeacott Family	Beyond the Wizard's Sleeve; Skream + Benga; Firas; Kwesachu mixtape (ft Micachu, Kwes, Dels, Ghostpoet and more); Caspa; Hip Hop Karaoke; Nash; The Endeacott Family	Broader Than Broadway vs The Revenge; Bridgewater Sound System; Reggae Roast; Set The Tone 67; Hip Hop Karaoke; Lou and Mal; Family Barrett

Arcadia
Friday 26 June	Saturday 27 June	Sunday 28 June
Disco of Doom; Hybrid (DJ); Subsource; Circus Show; Lee Mortimer (DJ); Freefall Collective; Circus Show; Tristan (DJ); Blackout; Dreadzone (DJ); Baby Head; Dub FX	Evil Nine; Far Too Loud (DJ); Adam Freeland; Circus Show; Alex Metric (DJ); Sicknote; Circus Show; Kid Blue (DJ); Smerins Anti Social Club; Dub FC	Freq Nasty (DJ); Zion Train; Circus Show; Jazzsteppa; Baobinga B2B Reso (DJ); Circus Show; The Egg; Powersteppers (DJ); Pronghorn; Dub FX; King Porter Stomp

BBC Introducing
Friday 26 June	Saturday 27 June	Sunday 28 June
Engine-Earz; KOF; Colorama; Louise Golbey; Two Door Cinema Club; Sparrow and the Workshop; Cashier No.9; The Heroes; Man Like Me; The Molotovs; Friendly Fires(Secret Set)	Vienna Ditto; Speech Debelle; King Charles; Goldheart Assembly; The Alfonz; Rogues; Kidbass; 10k Runner; Travelling Band; Bicycle Thieves	Life in Film; States of Emotion; Kobi Onyame; Essay Like Nephew; Fists; Dimbleby & Capper; Andreya Triana; The 1,2,3,4s The Suitables; The Fuels

The Bimble Inn
Friday 26 June	Saturday 27 June	Sunday 28 June
Swiss FX; The Correspondents; Mad Dog Mcray; Special Guest; Martin Harley Band; Daddy Ho! Lonely Schizophrenik	DJ Cindy Pink; Very Special Guests; Big Hand; John Fairhurst; Lovebirds; Douglas James Show; The Lost Brothers; The Carrivick Sisters	Special Guests; Roots Union; Rum Shabeen; Passenger; The Domino State; Wilfredo; Stephen Junior; Bobbie Magees

Poetry&Words 2009
Friday 26 June	Saturday 27 June	Sunday 28 June
Helen Gregory (poet); A Poem in Between People; Hollie McNish; Cat Kidd; Derrick C. Brown; Rosy Carrick; Nathan Filer; Anita Govan; Andy Craven-Griffiths; The Poetry Chicks; Dreadlockalien; Rosemary Harris; Joolz; Mike McGee; Porky the Poet (AKA Phill Jupitus)	DJ Cindy Pink; The Poetry Chicks; Nathan Filer; Open mic (hosted by Sophia Blackwell); Mike McGee; Jude Simpson; Cat Kidd; Mark Mace Smith (2008 Slam Winner); Rosy Carrick; A Poem in Between People; Attila the Stockbroker; Andreattah Chuma; Murray Lachlan Young; Aisle 16	Jude Simpson; Murray Lachlan Young; Steve Tasane; Andreattah Chuma; Adam Horovitz (Website poet in residence); Anita Govan; Pete Hunter; John Hegley; Hollie McNish; Derrick Brown; Helen Gregory; Slam (hosted by Dreadlockalien Middleman Productions)

== Impact of Michael Jackson's death ==
The news of Michael Jackson's death spread during the night of 25 June. Various tributes were made to him by performers throughout 26 June, including Dizzee Rascal leading a crowd rendition of Jackson's hit "Thriller", and N.E.R.D frontman Pharrell Williams paying respects for Jackson in saying "It's the music, the music was so incredible", before adding that Jackson "changed music and the way people looked at music." Other performers to pay tribute to Jackson included The Streets, Hugh Cornwell, Lily Allen, Dan Le Sac Vs Scroobius Pip and Gabriella Cilmi. Within hours of his death, there were T-shirts for sale proclaiming "I was at Glasto 09 when Jacko died" and shops announcing "Michael Jackson has died, 10% off everything."

== Swine flu at Glastonbury 2009 ==
Several cases of swine flu were reported during the festival. Two of these were students and one a 10-year-old child. The three infected festival-goers were isolated when symptoms presented and no further cases have been reported. Festival organisers had reportedly anticipated some cases of the virus with a spokesperson saying "...the figure of three in 177,000 people is regarded as very low."
