= Glastonbury Festival 2010 =

Edition of annual music festival

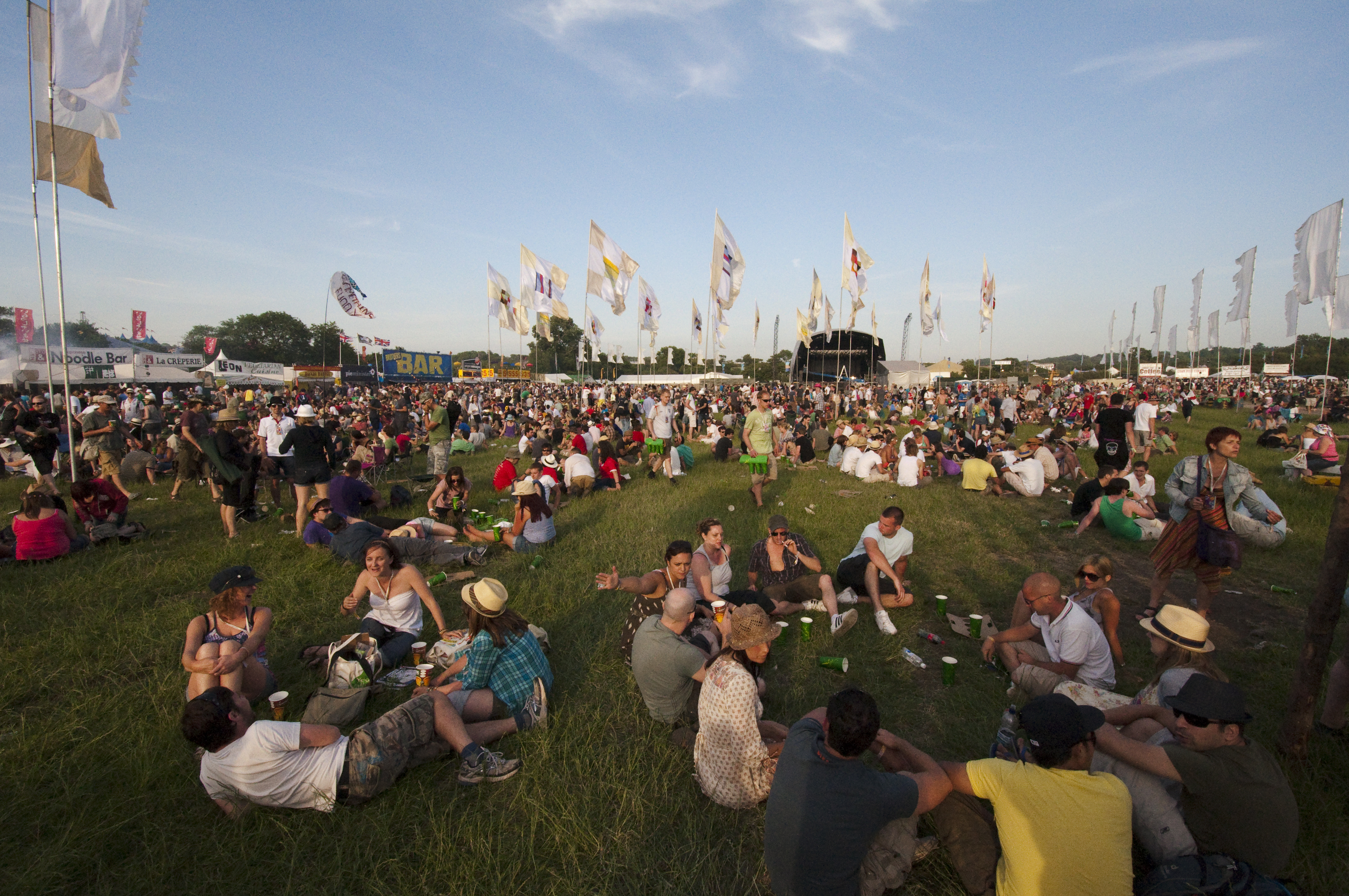
- Audience in front of the West Holts stage
- Date: 23 June 2010 – 28 June 2010
- Locations: Worthy Farm, Pilton, Somerset, England
- Previous event: Glastonbury Festival 2009
- Next event: Glastonbury Festival 2011
- Participants: Gorillaz, Muse, Stevie Wonder

The 2010 Glastonbury Festival of Contemporary Performing Arts took place in Pilton, Somerset, England, in June 2010. The festival was headlined by Gorillaz, Muse, and Stevie Wonder. U2 were initially announced as headliners, but withdrew on 25 May 2010 citing Bono's recent back surgery. Gorillaz were announced as the replacement. A crowd of 177,500 people attended the event, which was totally rain-free for the first time since 2002.

== Tickets ==
Similar to previous years, ticket buyers were required to pre-register to buy tickets with photographic identification, a measure employed to avoid reselling and touting. Tickets went on sale on 4 October and sold out within 12 hours of going on sale; quicker than the past two festivals. The general resale commenced on 11 April at 9:00 am, with all tickets selling out within 2 hours.

== Attendance and weather ==
The total attendance of the event was 177,500. The festival was totally rain-free for the first time since 2002, and experienced the hottest average temperatures since the early 1990s. This would also prove to be the last rain-free Glastonbury Festival until 2019.

== Line-up ==
On 23 November 2009, it was announced that U2 would be headlining the Friday evening of the festival. Other acts confirmed by organisers include Jack Johnson, the early winners of the Emerging Talent Competition, My Luminaries and eventual final winners Ellen and the Escapades.

At the 2010 Event Production Show, Michael Eavis confirmed the booking of Muse and said that a headline appearance by Stevie Wonder was "probable", with the BBC confirming his appearance the following week.

On 14 April 2010, the full lineup of the event was announced.

On 25 May 2010, it was announced that U2 had cancelled their appearance at the festival to allow Bono's recovery from recent back surgery. Bono issued a special message of his heartbreak to the fans - "I'm heartbroken" - and said "we even wrote a song especially for the festival". The following day it was announced that Gorillaz would fill in for U2.

=== Special guest appearances ===
A number of artists made special or unannounced appearances at the festival, including many on smaller stages such as the Park Stage or the Avalon Stage.

In early June, Keane announced a surprise slot at the Avalon stage.

Radiohead singer Thom Yorke and guitarist Jonny Greenwood, billed simply as "Special Guests", performed on the Park Stage on the Friday, introduced by Glastonbury founder Michael Eavis, who called them "two superstars" and "the biggest surprise of the weekend". They played Radiohead hits such as "Karma Police", "Street Spirit (Fade Out)" and "Pyramid Song" as well as some of Yorke's solo material.

The other secret gig on the Park Stage was by Scottish trio Biffy Clyro who announced on Twitter that they would perform at the Park Stage on Saturday. The trio had left a series of visual clues about their performance.

Kylie Minogue performed with the Scissor Sisters on the Pyramid Stage, and Lou Reed, Snoop Dogg, Mark E. Smith and Shaun Ryder joined the Gorillaz for various songs during their headlining set. Florence Welch, from Florence and the Machine, sang "You Got the Love" with The XX and "You Got the Dirtee Love" with Dizzee Rascal during his Pyramid Stage set. On the Pyramid Stage on Friday, during Snoop Dogg's set, Tinie Tempah came on stage and performed "Pass Out".

To make up for U2 cancelling their appearance, The Edge joined Muse during their Saturday headlining slot for a cover of "Where the Streets Have No Name".

Shakira invited to René from Calle 13 to join them and together performed their song "Gordita" at the Pyramid Stage on Saturday.

On the Sunday, Matt Smith, who plays the Eleventh Doctor, performed with Orbital and Michael Eavis appeared on the main stage with Stevie Wonder, to sing the chorus of the latter's "Happy Birthday", marking the festival's 40th year.

=== Stages 1 to 11 ===
Source: Line up poster

Pyramid Stage
| Friday 25 June | Saturday 26 June | Sunday 27 June |
| Gorillaz; Dizzee Rascal; Vampire Weekend; Snoop Dogg; Willie Nelson; Corinne Bailey Rae; Femi Kuti; Rolf Harris | Muse; Scissor Sisters; Shakira; The Dead Weather; Seasick Steve; Jackson Browne; The Lightning Seeds; Tinchy Stryder | Stevie Wonder; Faithless; Jack Johnson; Ray Davies; Slash; Norah Jones; Paloma Faith; Yeovil Town Band |

Other Stage
| Friday 25 June | Saturday 26 June | Sunday 27 June |
| The Flaming Lips; Hot Chip; Florence and the Machine; La Roux; Phoenix; The Courteeners; The Stranglers; Joshua Radin; The Magic Numbers | Pet Shop Boys; Editors; The Cribs; The National; Kate Nash; Imogen Heap; Coheed and Cambria; Reef; Two Door Cinema Club | Orbital; LCD Soundsystem; MGMT; We Are Scientists; Grizzly Bear; The Temper Trap; The Hold Steady; Frightened Rabbit; The Joy Formidable |

John Peel Stage
| Friday 25 June | Saturday 26 June | Sunday 27 June |
| Groove Armada; The Black Keys; Mumford & Sons; Ellie Goulding; Kele Okereke; Bombay Bicycle Club; Tegan and Sara; Miike Snow; De Staat; Detroit Social Club | Jamie T Foals; The xx Marina & The Diamonds; Delphic; Wild Beasts; Field Music; Cymbals Eat Guitars; Sophie Hunger; Let's Buy Happiness | Ash; Julian Casablancas; Broken Social Scene; Gang of Four; The Drums; Holy Fuck; These New Puritans; Everything Everything; Black Cherry; Dan Mangan |

West Holts
| Friday 25 June | Saturday 26 June | Sunday 27 June |
| Mos Def; Femi Kuti; Nouvelle Vague & Guests; Breakestra with Chali 2na Bonobo; Mariachi El Bronx; Tune-Yards; Matthew Herbert Big Band | George Clinton with Parliament-Funkadelic; The Jerry Dammers Spatial AKA Orchestra; Os Mutantes; Devendra Banhart; Bassekou Kouyate & Ngoni Ba; Phenomenal Handclap Band; Brother Ali; Troy Ellis & The Longshots | Rodrigo y Gabriela; Toots & the Maytals; Quantic & Bárbaro; Staff Benda Bilili; Dr John; Tunng; The Bees; Dizraeli and the Small Gods |

Acoustic Stage
| Friday 25 June | Saturday 26 June | Sunday 27 June |
| The Bootleg Beatles; The Alan Price Set; McIntosh Ross; Turin Brakes; Brian Kennedy; Danny & The Champs; Megan Henwood; Cory Chisel; Julie Feeney | Christy Moore; Nick Lowe; Imelda May; Al Stewart; Michael Eavis In Conversation; Gandalf Murphy & The Slambovian Circus; The Leisure Society; Ellen & The Escapades; John Allen & Band | Jackson Browne with David Lindley; Richard Thompson; Loudon Wainwright III; The Blues Band; London Community Gospel Choir; Joel Rafael; Robinson; Fisherman's Friends; Mayhew |

Park Stage
| Friday 25 June | Saturday 26 June | Sunday 27 June |
| The XX; Broken Bells; Thom Yorke & Jonny Greenwood; The Big Pink; Local Natives; Steve Mason; Hypnotic Brass Ensemble; Beth Jeans Houghton; Lissie; Peggy Sue; Steel Harmony | Midlake; Laura Marling; Candi Staton; Biffy Clyro; Stornoway; Beach House; Strange Boys; Frankie & The Heartstrings; The Ballad of Britain; Here We Go Magic; I Blame Coco | Empire of the Sun; Dirty Projectors; Tony Allen; Archie Bronson Outfit; Beak; Portico Quartet; Fionn Regan; Avi Buffalo; Villagers; Travelling Band |

East Dance
| Friday 25 June | Saturday 26 June | Sunday 27 June |
| DJ Fatboy Slim; Live Chase and Status; DJ Zane Lowe; Live Plan B DJ Rob da Bank; Live Example; DJ Roger Sanchez; DJ O Children; Bunny Come; Live Inko Dancers | Live N-Dubz; Live Chipmunk; Live Kelis; DJ MistaJam; Live Tinie Tempah; Live Giggs; DJ Yasmin; Live Chiddy Bang; Live McClean; Live Bashy; Live Donaeo; Live Roll Deep; DJ TBA | DJ Above & Beyond; Live Crystal Castles; DJ Filthy Dukes; Live Professor Green; DJ Reverend Soundsystem; Live Crystal Fighters; Live We Have Band; DJ Yasmin; Live Naive New Beaters; Live Primary 1 Live Inko Dancers |

West Dance
| Friday 25 June | Saturday 26 June | Sunday 27 June |
| DJ Boys Noize; DJ Simian Mobile Disco; Live Delphic; DJ Fake Blood; DJ Rusko; Live Chromeo; DJ Aeroplane; DJ Boy 8-Bit; DJ Hannah Holland | DJ Dubfire; DJ Nick Warren; Live Mix Hell; DJ Sander Kleinenberg; Live Banco de Gaia; DJ Riva Starr; Live Neville Staple; Live Dub Pistols; DJ Parker; Live Foreign Beggars | Live Magnetic Man; DJ Jackbeats; Live Stanton Warriors; DJ Adam F Live Blasted Mechanism; DJ Toddla T Live Alex Metric Live; DJ South Central; DJ Jaguar Skills; DJ A1 Bassline; Live Killaflaw; Live Virus Syndicate |

Avalon
| Friday 25 June | Saturday 26 June | Sunday 27 June |
| New Model Army; Transglobal Underground; Newton Faulkner; The Woodentops; Lou Rhodes; Goldheart Assembly; Gabby Young & The Other Animals; Hobo Jones & The Junkyard Dogs | The Lightning Seeds; Alabama 3 Charlie Winston; Steve Harley & Cockney Rebel; The Unthanks; The Avett Brothers; The Wurzels; Nick Harper; Tom Williams & The Boat | Gomez; The Saw Doctors; Imelda May; Judy Collins; Keane; Teddy Thompson; Adrian Edmondson & The Bad Shepherds; Kirsty Almeida; Ellen & The Escapades |

Croissant Neuf
| Friday 25 June | Saturday 26 June | Sunday 27 June |
| Movits! 6ixtoys Steve Knightley; Julien Tulk Band; Undercover Hippy Band; Seth Lakeman; Biggles Wartime Band | The Beat; Mr. B The Gentleman Rhymer; Hot Feat; The Kevin Brown Trio; The Vagaband; TBA; Dizraeli & The Small Gods | The Baghdaddies; Zen Elephants; Prof Nohair & the Wig Lifters; Corinne Bailey-Rae; Corinne Bailey Rae; The People's String Foundation |

The Queen's Head
| Friday 25 June | Saturday 26 June | Sunday 27 June |
| Sean Rowley; Good Shoes; The Bees; The Magic Numbers; The Mystery Jets; Fanfarlo; Detroit Social Club; Tubelord; Tiffany Page; Frank Turner; Fiction Plane; The Beat | Sean Rowley; Earl Brutus; Cherry Ghost; Phenomenal Handclap Band; Band of Skulls; Holy Fuck; Blood Red Shoes; Here We Go Magic; Cate Le Bon; Lissie; Shouting at Planes | Sean Rowley; Dan Le Sac vs Scroobius Pip; Avi Buffalo; The Middle East; Chief; I Am Kloot; Field Music; Goldhawks; The Middle East; Mountain Man |

=== Stages 12 to 20 ===
WOW
| Friday 25 June | Saturday 26 June | Sunday 27 June |
| Futureboogie; Matt Tolfrey & Geddes; Jamie Jones; Live Crazy P Horsemeat Disco; Live Nneka; Back to Basics; Adam Shelton & Subb-an; PBR Streetgang; El Diablos Social Club; Christophe | Craig Charles Presents the Fantasy Funk Band; Craze; High Contrast; Redlight & MC Dread; L-VIS 1990; Breakage; Live Central Spillz; Live Hot D'Jour; Emalkay; Jakwob; Shortstuff; The Heatwave; Dub Boy ft Redskin | The Ratpack; Live Snap! Tayo; Live Four Tet; Hyperdub with Kode9, Ikonika, Terror Danjah & Dark Star; Live Hudson Mohawke; Live DaM FunK; Roska; Untold; Wedge; Funkineven; Falling Up |

Cubehenge
| Friday 25 June | Saturday 26 June | Sunday 27 June |
| Live The Orb; DJ Zero 7 Will Saul; Spooky; Iain Taylor (rEJEKTS); Pete Gooding; Ruth Flowers aka Mamy Rock; The Magnet | Kissy Sell Out; A Skillz; Bimbo Jones; Pathaan; Paul Lyman; Baobinga; Adam Regan | Norman Jay Good Times ‘Carnival King’ Ashley Beedle; DJ Craig Charles Funk & Soul; Kormac; The Bee Keepers; SledgeHeadBristol; RSD; DJ Flora feat DJ Skylion; 2 Kings |

Pussy Parlure
| Friday 25 June | Saturday 26 June | Sunday 27 June |
| DJ Zorro; Jose Luis & Dancers; Fletcha & Miguel Salsa Magic; Live Robin Del Castillo & his Latin Band; La bomba - Latin Explosion; Eclectic Ballroom; Live Andreya Triana; Bourbon Warfare DJs; Live Incredibly Strange Film Band; Take It 2 The Bridge; Live Secret Cinema Band; Feeling Gloomy; Live Sound of Rum; Lovely Morning with Randy & Earls Old Record Club | Live Swaparama; Jalapeño Sound System; Rock Idol (Live Karaoke); Live Smoove & Turrell; Dr Rubberfunk; Live Taylor McFerrin; Western Soul; Live Reverend Soundsystem; DJ Burns; Randy & Earls Old Record Club | Movits; Live Kormac Big Band; Live Twilight Players; Live The Correspondents; TBA; Live Movits; DJ Nick Hollywood; Live Fat 45; Danny Danger; DJ Joe Worricker; Broken Hearts; Live Top Shelf Jazz; Live Trio Manouche; Randy & Earls Old Record Club |

Magic Bubble
| Friday 25 June | Saturday 26 June | Sunday 27 June |
| Kareem Raihani; Kangaroo Moon; Dansette Junior; Pressplay; Magic Bubble Residents | Stroke '69; Reverend Soundsystem; Sam Taylor & The Tight Trousers; The Scribes; Magic Bubble Residents | Ramses; DubKasm; Sound of Rum; Dougal; United VIbrations; Magic Bubble Residents |

Glade Stage
| Friday 25 June | Saturday 26 June | Sunday 27 June |
| Sasha; Quivver; Hybrid; Way Out West; Afrobeta; Husky Rescue; Nneka; Charles Hazelwood Allstars | Sub Focus Live; Freq Nasty; Dreadzone; Don Letts; The Orb; African Headcharge; The Moody Boys; ON u Sound/Sherwood; Nero; Suns of Arqa; Statement Code; City Calls | Levellers; Alabama 3 Arthur Brown; Quintessence; System 7 (band); FORM (Ans & Allaby); Cassette Boy feat DJ Rubbish; Inverse Gravity Vehicle; The Widowmaker; Somewhere Between Here and The Stereo |

Glade Lounge
| Friday 25 June | Saturday 26 June | Sunday 27 June |
| Tom Real (Disco Of Doom); Ben & Lex; Far Too Loud; DJ Die; Maxxi P, MC Script; Fred V v Grafix; Jinx In Dub; Lewah; UBJ with Mr Woodnote; Pharma | Dave Seaman; Pretty Lights; Charlie May Live; Jody WOW; Zodiac Cartel; Cosmonauts; 808 State DJS; Casanueva | Tristan - Live; Lucas; FORM; Major Clanger; Mirror System; Ali Ji; Merv; HFB; DJ Alex Paterson; Naked Nick |

The Rabbit Hole
| Friday 25 June | Saturday 26 June | Sunday 27 June |
| Bunny Come; Transpersonals; The Mad Cows; 360; Cromwells League; The Soap Dodgers; Bryony Marie Fry; The Tailors; Poppy and Friends; The Ballaghs; Aishling; Rory H Freddie Page; Bert Miller and other animals | The Egg dj Doorly; Dreadzone dj Far Too Loud; Space Ritual; Quintessence; Dj Mad Mick; Special guests. Hazel Sainsbury; Dan Mangan; Gabby Young and Other Animals; Pete Lawrie; Skinny Lister; Jamie Burke | Dubble Head; Special secret guests Bad Hatters Cabaret; The Kleptones; Elvis (The Real one); The Travelling Band; Perhaps Contraption; Rabbit Foot Spasm Band; Babeshadow; Troy Ellis and the Long Shots; Sound of Rum; Lion Child; Josh Thorner; Hot tin Cat; Georgie Pope |

BBC Introducing
| Friday 25 June | Saturday 26 June | Sunday 27 June |
| Kid Adrift; Meursault; Ms Darks (Da Mighty Elementz) DME; The Federals; Out Like A Lion; P Money; Napoleon In Rags; Jesca Hoop; Yr Ods | Roll Deep plus Guests; Pulled Apart by Horses; May 68; Celt Islam; New Islands; Lanterns on the Lake; Lady Leshurr; SPECIAL GUESTS; Dog Is Dead; Fellow Stranger; Two in a Boat; Louis Elliot & The Embers | Chew Lips; Dark Horses; Man Without Country; Seven Summits; Lettie; Dry The River; SPECIAL GUESTS; Broadcast 2000; Patch William; End of Level Baddie; John E Vistic Experience; The Theory of 6 Degrees |

The Bimble Inn
| Friday 25 June | Saturday 26 June | Sunday 27 June |
| Andy Barlow (Lamb); Rum Shebeen; Domino State; Guest DJ Yearner Babies; Special Guests Blackberry Wood; The Little Unsaid; Andrew Morris; Woolley Mammoth; Kate Rose | Papa Dez (DJ); Brass Roots; Meme Narciss & Lily La Rouge; Django Django; Mike Bird (Birds, Orphans & Fools); Hobo Jones; Open Mic 10 Ton Tongue; Martin Harley; Undercover Hippy; Mayhew; Daddy Ho! Bettie Bolan | Special Guest The Amigos; Roots Union; Wilfredo; Guest DJ Open Mic John Smith; Very Special Guest Wille and the Bandits; Dan Mangan; Slightly Offensive Steve; Beans On Toast |

Poetry&Words 2010
| Friday 25 June | Saturday 26 June | Sunday 27 June |
| Dizraeli and The Small Gods - Unplugged; Penny Ashton; Baba Brinkman; Sabrina Mahfouz; Tony Walsh; Aisle 16; Kat Francois; Ventriloquist; Paula Varjack; Andreattah Chuma; Jonny Fluffypunk; Kae Tempest; Pete the Temp; Poeticat; Helen Gregory and Pete Hunter | John Hegley; Paula Varjack; Andreattah Chuma; Attila the Stockbroker; Hollie McNish; Luke Wright; Kae Tempest; Murray Lachlan Young; Sabrina Mahfouz; Bohdan Piasecki; Open mic. (hosted by Julian Ramsey-Wade) Ventriloquist; Jonny Fluffypunk | Glastonbury Festival Poetry Slam (hosted by Kat Francois) Helen Gregory and Benita Johnson; Pete Hunter; Pete the Temp; Jean Binta Breeze; Poeticat; Luke Wright; Jo Bell (Website Poet in Residence); Bohdan Piasecki; Julian Ramsey-Wade; Penny Ashton; Baba Brinkman; Comperes – Dreadlcokalien and Abbey Oliveira |
