= The Collectable Few =

British indie/alternative band

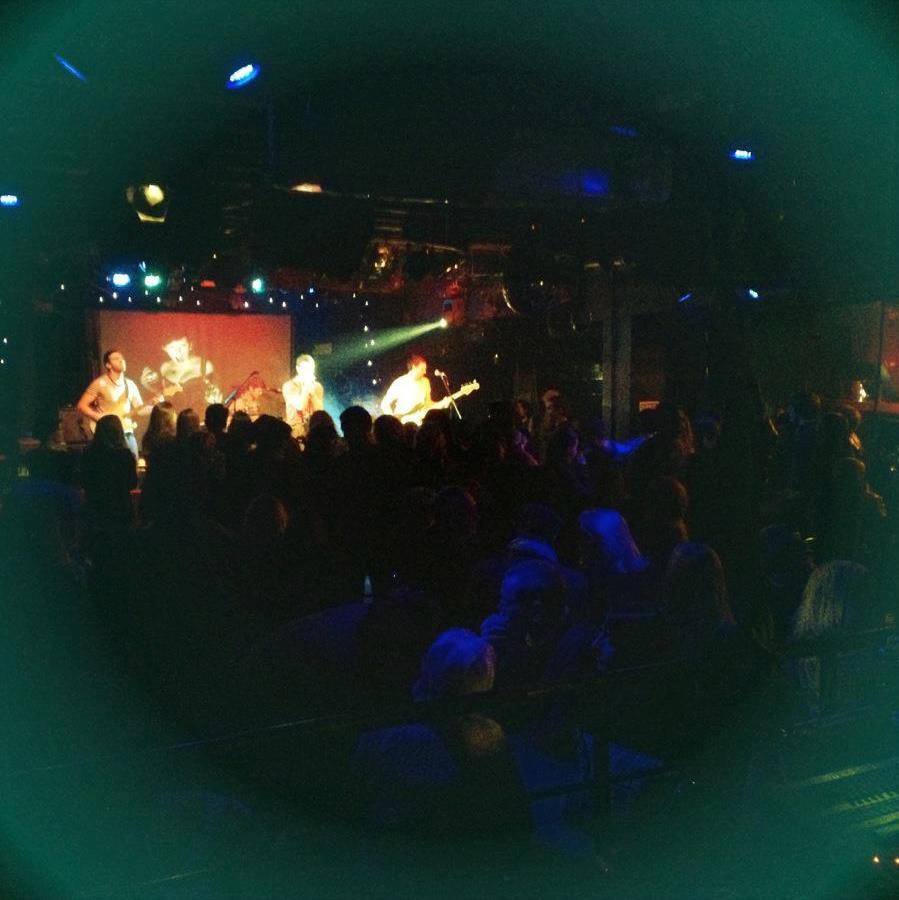
- The Collectable Few playing Dingwalls, London in 2012.

Background information
- Also known as: Diaz
- Origin: West London, England
- Genres: Indie rock, alternative
- Years active: c.2006–2012
- Labels: Laissez Faire Club, Wave Machine, Salvia (XL Recordings), Universal Music Group
- Members: Tarek Al-Shammaa; Nat Cantor; Tom Christensen; Alex Hammond

The Collectable Few are a former British Indie/Alternative band from West London, active between 2006–2012. They released four singles, two EPs and two full-length albums. The band consisted of Tarek Al-Shammaa on lead vocals and synths, Tom Christensen on bass guitar and backing vocals, Nat Cantor on guitars, piano and synths, and Alex Hammond on drums, percussion and backing vocals.

== History ==
Initially formed in 2006, the band began rehearsing in Shepherds Bush, sharing the same studio space as fellow London band The Mystery Jets. They played their first gig at The Enterprise, Camden towards the end of the year.

By 2009, The Collectable Few had built a strong London following thanks to relentless gigging across the capital. In March, the band signed their first record deal with prestigious XL Recordings' imprint Salvia. The "Missing Out" EP was released on the label on 9 August 2009. Towards the end of the year they began a transatlantic working relationship with New York-based, Grammy award-winning mixer/producer Andrew Maury, known for his work with Lizzo, Shawn Mendes, Lewis Del Mar, Ra Ra Riot and Remix Artist Collective (RAC).

In October 2010, they signed to the London-based Laissez Faire Club label. Their first single on the label was "Headstrong" released on 24 January 2011. The B-side featured an RAC remix of the title track, also mixed by Andrew Maury. "Headstrong" gained the band further recognition, getting regular airplay on XFM, BBC Radio 1 and BBC 6 Music. The Collectable Few continued to gig heavily in 2011, joining the NME Radar Tour with Anna Calvi and Grouplove, while also playing shows alongside other notable acts, including Eliza Doolittle, Bastille, Bombay Bicycle Club, The Whigs (band), The Maccabees, We Have Band and The Big Pink. The band released follow up single "Model Behaviour" later that year, which featured a music video starring model and actress Zoe Lister. They also featured as Replay's 'Road Trip to Bestival' band to watch that summer.

The Collectable Few started the first half of 2012 touring across the UK and Europe, including joint headline dates with Dog Is Dead and Let's Buy Happiness. In June, they travelled to the United States to record their debut album with now longstanding collaborator Andrew Maury. Pre-production sessions took place in Brooklyn at Rubber Tracks studio. The album was then recorded and mixed between early June and mid-July at Black Dog studio in Upstate New York. After completing their "Vancouver" LP (later released under the name Diaz), the band played a handful of US dates, which included the renowned Bowery Ballroom in New York City, playing many of the album's tracks live for the first time.

The Collectable Few's final appearances were at The Queen of Hoxton with Tribes (band) and Chapel Club, and two sold out nights at the Borderline on 11 and 12 December 2012. However, they briefly resurfaced in the summer of 2013 to play the Hoxton Square Bar & Kitchen and Carnaby Sound Festival under the name Diaz.

The Collectable Few's second full-length album named "Retrospective" was released on 17 January 2016, featuring unreleased tracks and singles spanning the band's career.

Alex Hammond is now drumming for Pias Recordings' artist Ten Fé, while Tom and Nat went on to play in Karima Francis's live/touring band and start their own production collective, Dance Lessons.

== TV, film & fashion ==
The band's music has been featured in TV, film and fashion. "Headstrong" was used in an official promotional film for then world heavyweight boxing champion Wladimir Klitschko in 2013. Their songs were also selected for Fendi's global spring/summer '18 fashion commercial, Topshop's 2012 in-store playlist, and feature film The Knot starring Mena Suvari and Talulah Riley. Their song "Glamour" served as the theme song for Channel 4's emerging music show: Curated By Lyle and Scott. And in September 2011, the band were invited to play the opening of California fashion brand Patagonia (clothing)'s London flagship store in Covent Garden.

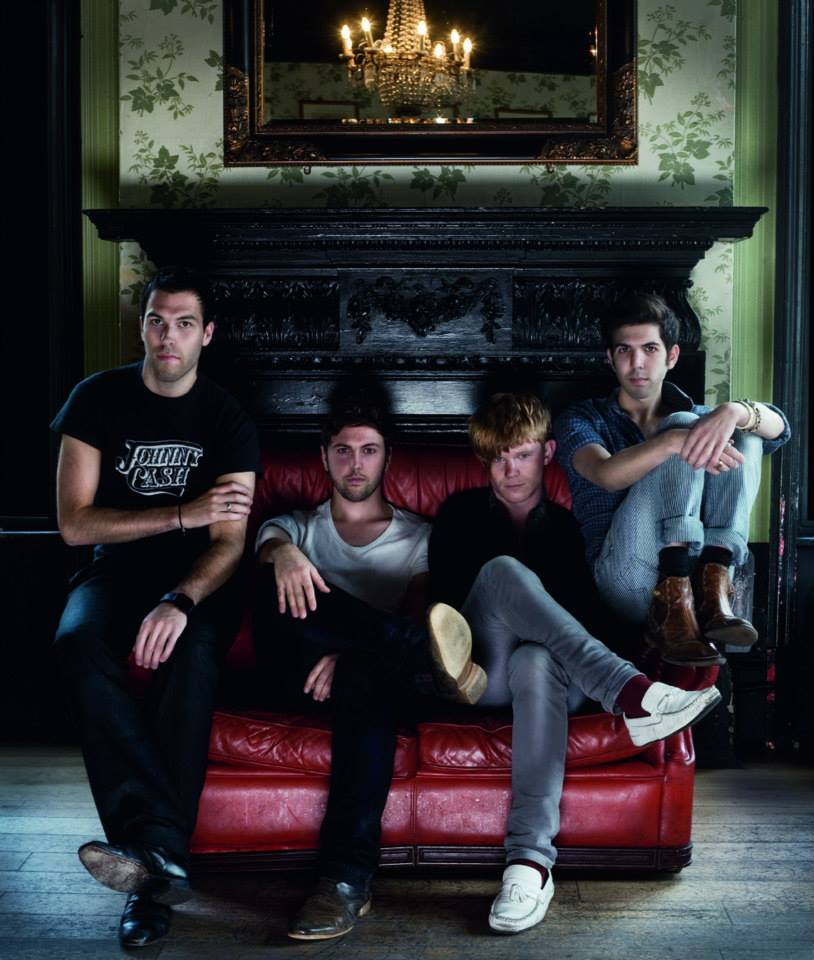
The Collectable Few press shot

=== Discography ===
- "Missing Out" Single (2009), Salvia/XL Recordings
- The "Missing Out" EP (2009), Salvia/XL Recordings
- "Half The Night" EP (2010), Wave Machine/ Universal Music Group (distribution)
- "Headstrong" Single (2011), Laissez Faire Club
- "Model Behaviour" Single (2011), Wave Machine/ Universal Music Group (distribution)
- "Glamour" Single (2012), Wave Machine/ Universal Music Group (distribution)

=== Albums ===
- "Vancouver" (2014) (released under the name of Diaz), Wave Machine
- "Retrospective" (2016), Wave Machine/ Laissez Faire Club/ Salvia/XL Recordings/ Universal Music Group (distribution)
