= Trans-Siberian March Band =

Balkan musical group

The Trans-Siberian March Band
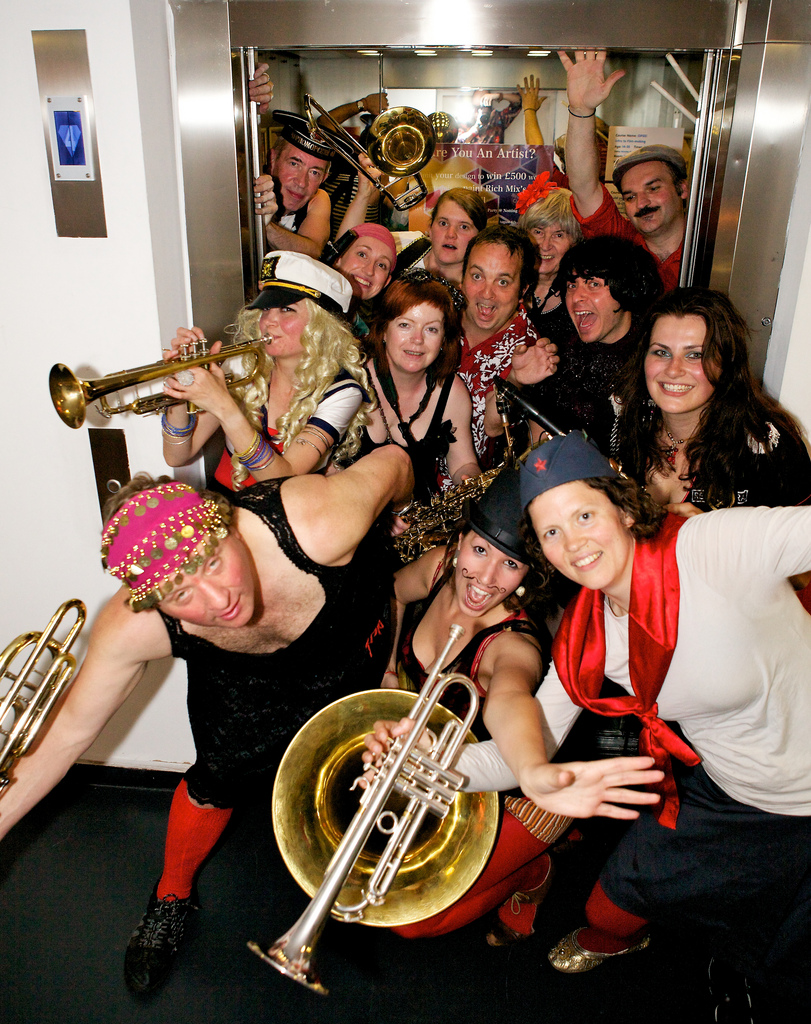
- TSMB at Rich Mix, August 2011. Photo by Traz Rodd

Background information
- Origin: London, England, UK
- Genres: Balkan; Gypsy music World
- Years active: 2007-present
- Label: Kremlin Kitchen Records
- Members: Fotis Begklis, Isabella Fletcher, Patrick Friel, Jenny Greig, Pippa Holmes, Lucy Lester, Emily Lim, Sarah Mann, Becky Millward, Raoul Neumann, Sally Outwin, Bob Payne, Kath Pollard, Donald Ridley, Chris Woodham

The Trans-Siberian March Band (TSMB) is a London-based Balkan music band. They play the music of the Balkans, and also Russian, Turkish and Klezmer tunes. Their repertoire ranges from the well-known, such as Goran Bregović's Mesečina, to the obscure. They also write their own material, described by the band as 'affectionate pastiche’. They are well known on the London Balkan Music scene, and also have an international reputation due to touring in Eastern Europe. They also have a following in Japan after an appearance on Japanese television.

== The band's sound and look ==
They are not purist in their approach to the music, and believe in mixing up styles and influences to create their sound. They mark the similarities between certain Balkan-style rhythms and ska, and include ska versions of Balkan tunes, such as their arrangement of Šaban Bajramović's Buba Maro, from the Emir Kusturica film Black Cat, White Cat, which they have renamed Ska Maro, and of the Klezmer standard Golden Khassene, renamed Kompletely Khassene. They are prominent on London's Balkan scene of bands playing what can be broadly described as Gypsy music. They have a brass-based sound, rather than one featuring violins, cimbalom, accordion or other instruments that could be classed as typical of this kind of music. With this approach, they follow a tradition established by leading Balkan music lights Fanfare Ciocărlia, the Boban Marković Band and the Kočani Orkestar, rather than, for example, violin pioneers Taraf de Haïdouks. A closer comparison is with the 3 Mustaphas 3, the London Balkan band from the 1980s, while a Time Out review described them as 'the Sex Pistols of Balkan Brass'. Their line-up features a front line of 3 trumpets, 2 clarinets, and 1 alto saxophone and a back line of 2 tubas, 1 bass trombone, 1 tenor trombone, 1 guitar and 2 percussionists playing, variously, a darabouka, cymbals, a davoul and a snare drum. They have also included a French horn, a violin and a mandola in their line up. To begin their gigs, the band often march while playing. This spectacle, the band usually playing battle marches from the Ottoman Janissaries' repertoire, draws attention to the event. During the march, one of the trumpeters plays an ancient Greek instrument called a salpinx.

Band members of both genders cross-dress as part of their act. They present a cartoonish Soviet image, though they are not politically affiliated or oriented towards Soviet-style ideologies. The band costumes have included showgirl-type outfits, a Russian sailor, a Yugoslav Pioneer girl scout, a baboushka, a Russian cyclist, outlandish hats, wigs and dresses, and garish make-up.

== Appearances ==
The TSMB play on London's Balkan and burlesque scene, in dedicated venues or one-off Balkan nights, pubs, clubs and masked balls. They also play outside London. They have played many festivals, including Glastonbury (2009), Secret Garden (2009), Lovebox (2009 and 2011), the Henley Festival (2010) and the Thames Festival (2010). They also played in the Royal Festival Hall as part of Bandstand Busking (2010). Other high-profile appearances they have made include the Playgroup Festival, the Out of the Ordinary Festival, Extraordinary Voices at the Barbican, and Bestival and the Chalk Farm Roundhouse, in collaboration with Duncan Beiny, DJ Yoda. As of 2021 TSMB are readdressing their musical and community roots, after the lockdowns of 2020 and 2021. They played at the Bloomsbury Festival in October 2021.

== Residency at Rich Mix Cultural Foundation 2013-2016 ==
In 2013, the band began a residency at the Rich Mix venue in London's Shoreditch area, which continued into 2016. Once a month the band curated a free-entry evening at the venue, which featured other bands – not always limited to the Balkan scene – music and dance workshops and an appearance from the band itself.

== Unusual events ==
They have played at some unusual events, such as the 70th anniversary of the Kindertransport, at London's Liverpool Street Station (2008) in their first collaboration, in this case with actors from Liverpool John Moores University drama department. They played much of their Klezmer repertoire, but also included a Balkanised version of God Rest Ye Merry, Gentlemen. Other non-standard gigs have included a korfball tournament in Hungary, on the bridge in Mostar, in Bosnia, British shopping centres, on the steps of a museum in Mtskheta, in Georgia, and, also in Georgia, at an IDP camp. On 31 December 2011 the band did a full set as part of the Royal Festival Hall's New Year's Eve Party, and did a short marching set to lead guests out to see the fireworks, when they finished with a Balkan ska version of Auld Lang Syne. They played at the Musica alla Strade festival in Mercogliano, Italy in 2013, and in 2015 at the Folies des Fleurs festival, along with many European brass bands, in Paris.

== Tours ==
In addition to playing in many locations in the UK, including Brighton, Bristol, Sheffield, Edinburgh, Glasgow and North and South Wales, the band have done 3 overseas tours. In 2008 they played in Vienna, Austria, in Ráckeve, near Budapest, in Hungary, and, in Bosnia, in Maglaj, Mostar, and Sarajevo. In 2009 they played in Kotor, in Montenegro, and again in Bosnia, once again visiting Maglaj, Mostar and Sarajevo. In August 2011 they toured Georgia, playing in Gori, Mtskheta, Batumi and Tbilisi. The band organise the tours themselves, without management or agents, and finance them out of funds earned at their UK gigs. Band members use existing contacts, but also get in touch with promoters and venue-owners on spec, by e-mail or phone.

== Origins ==
The band was formed in mid-2007 by members of the wind section of the London Gypsy Orchestra, initially as a side-project from the orchestra. They were joined by musicians from a more traditional brass band. They later made the TSMB their primary musical outlet. Their first public performance was in the summer of 2007 at an open mic spot, as part of an evening of Gypsy/Balkan music. Their first booked gig came soon after.

== Collaborations with DJ Yoda and other artists ==
In 2011, the band began a collaboration, with Duncan Beiny, DJ Yoda. DJ Yoda supplied beats and effects from club hits, plus tunes orientated towards the band's usual repertoire, such as the Tetris theme, (Russian tune Korobeiniki) and his trademark visuals, while the band responded, added to them or led them. The collaboration was performed at various London venues and at festivals across the country, including WOMAD in 2013. The band also collaborate on a one-off basis with some of the acts they invite to their residency at Rich Mix, and have shared the stage with Delicatessen, the Green Rock River Band and The Bollywood Brass Band.

== 1st CD: The Tractor-Makers' Ball ==
In September 2010 the band released its first CD, The Tractor-Makers' Ball. It was recorded in three sessions at the Strongroom Studios in Shoreditch. The songs featured on the CD are as follows:

1. Kustino Oro – Serbia
2. Gorky Street – by Nick Sweeney
3. Meşk Havası – Turkey
4. Bublitschki – Klezmer
5. Ska Maro – Serbia
6. Sher – Klezmer
7. Politburo Reggae – a reworking of the song Tradition, from Fiddler on the Roof
8. Şina Nari – Turkey
9. Mesečina – Serbia
10. Petyorshka – Russia

== Petyorshka video release ==
In March 2012 the band released its first official video, entitled Petyorshka. Directed by Kobie Flashman, it showcases the band playing Russian tune Petyorshka at a woodland party into which two dazed, crash-landed cosmonauts have blundered.

== 2nd CD Running Away with the Circus ==
The band recorded most of the material for its second CD at London's Associated Independent Recording Studios in May 2015, with further work done on it at Strongroom Studios. It includes established tunes from Russia, such as Katyusha and Kalinka (song), plus some less well-known Balkan songs. It also includes 3 songs written by band members. It was released on 21 October 2016. The songs featured are as follows:

1. Ljute Rane – Serbia
2. Osman Ağa and Ben Seni Severim – Turkey
3. New Cross Horo – by bandleader Isabella Fletcher
4. Russian Medley – 3 Russian songs: Katyusha, Korobeiniki and Kalinka
5. Usti Usti Baba
6. Baltango – by trumpeter Kath Pollard
7. Der Rebbe Elimelech – Klezmer
8. Gubiţe – Romania
9. Borino Oro – Serbia
10. My War Gone By (I Miss It So) – by Nick Sweeney
11. Gemaparale – Romania
12. Kompletely Khasene – Klezmer

== Band members ==
The band members work in various fields, including musical performance, teaching, scientific enquiry, medicine, events organisation and sound engineering. Their ages range from mid-20s to mid-60s. Current members are:

- Fotis Begklis – percussion
- Jenny Greig – soprano sax
- Lucy Lester – tuba
- Emily Lim – trumpet and musical director
- Sarah Mann – tenor trombone
- Raoul Neumann – French horn
- Sally Outwin – alto sax
- Bob Payne – tuba
- Donald Ridley – bass trombone
- John Hargreaves – percussion
