= Major Major =

Major Major may refer to:

- Major Major (band), an indie rock band from Liverpool, United Kingdom
- Major Major Major Major, a fictional character from Joseph Heller's 1961 novel Catch-22
- A satirical meme associated with Maria Venus Raj, at the Question & Answer portion of the 59th Miss Universe beauty pageant
