= Experiments in Living (disambiguation) =

Experiments in Living may refer to:

- "experiments in living", a concept invoked by philosopher John Stuart Mill
- Among the Bohemians: Experiments in Living 1900–1939, 2002 book by Virginia Nicholson
- Experiments in Living, 2006 album by Four Day Hombre
- Experiments in Living, 2006 album by the band Hope & Social
