= I Am Harlequin =

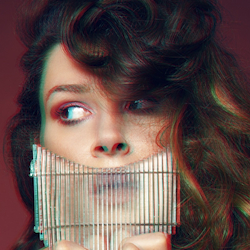
- IAH in 2014

Background information
- Born: Anne Freier
- Genres: Pop
- Instruments: Voice, piano, production
- Years active: 2013–present
- Website: iah.rocks

I Am Harlequin or IAH is the recording and production alias of London-based singer/songwriter and producer Anne Freier.

== Early life and education ==
Anne Freier was born in Dresden, Germany. Her father, who grew up during East Germany's GDR regime, had a big impact on her musical influences, introducing her to musicians such as Kate Bush, Whitney Houston, Chaka Khan, Billy Joel, Ricky Lee Jones, Tori Amos, and Joni Mitchell, as well as classical music such as Prokofiev, Rachmaninoff and later Sondheim.

Freier wrote her first song at the age of seven with the help of a bear-inspired English book for children. She then performed regularly with her sister in front of family and friends. She moved to London to study music.

== Career ==
IAH performed at Liverpool Sound City, Brighton Festival, Boardmasters Festival and LastFm Presents at the Garage and earned the seventeenth spot in the top 20 of the LastFm Discovery Charts.

Her single "Wild One" featured on the BBC drama Skins Season 6, Episode 9 as well as The Client List. In the same year, I Am Harlequin performed in a live session on BBC 4's Loose Ends, alongside the Civil Wars.

In Feb 2014, she wrote and featured on producer duo Hermanos Inglesos' single "The Fastlane", released through Sony Music.

IAH also remixes music and has previously remixed the Queen song "Don't Stop Me Now", turning the song into a symphonic choir piece.

In 2012 The Independent described IAH as “One To Watch […] she’s the beautifully cool pop star we’ve been waiting for” Joining a Wonderland live session, the magazine said: "Anne’s all about the performance, not the polish, not that her voice needs it, but her offhand style only adds to her effortlessly cool aura in her Wonderland Session." Vulture Hound called her latest single "Dance With Anyone" "the kind of groove you want immersed within your ‘Sound of Summer’ playlist"

Anne is a founding and active member of the alt-jazz pop band Dance Lessons.

== Discography ==
Wild One

- Released: May 2013
- Format: CD and Digital
- Label: Oh! Inverted World
- Writer: Anne Freier
- Producer: Anne Freier

The Fastlane feat. I Am Harlequin

- Released: Feb 2014
- Format: CD and Digital
- Label: Sony Music
- Writer: Anne Freier
- Producer: Hermanos Inglesos

I Was in Love

- Released: 03 November 2014
- Format: Digital
- Label: Stop Being Cute
- Writer: Anne Freier
- Producer: I Am Harlequin & Domzilla

Kill the Night

- Released: 23 February 2015
- Format: Digital
- Label: Stop Being Cute
- Writer: Anne Freier
- Producer: I Am Harlequin & Domzilla

Side Effects feat. I Am Harlequin

- Released: May 2015
- Format: Digital
- Label: Sony Music
- Writer: Anne Freier
- Producer: Hermanos Inglesos

Dance with Anyone

- Released: 26 June 2015
- Format: Digital
- Label: Stop Being Cute
- Writer: Anne Freier
- Producer: Domzilla

== See also ==
- Dance Lessons
