= List of NME concert tours =

Logo of the 2008 NME Awards Tour.

The NME Tours consist of a variety of tours organised by British music industry publication NME. Throughout the year, NME sponsors numerous tours of the United Kingdom by various up-and-coming and established bands in a variety of formats. The tours are titled to reflect the genre and type of bands playing on them.

== ShockWaves NME Awards Tours ==
Logo of the 2006 NME Awards Tour.

The ShockWaves NME Awards Tours (known without sponsorship as the NME Awards Tour before 1999, and the Brat Bus Tour before 1998) normally took place in the lead up to the official NME Awards themselves. The tour was known to sell out in just a matter of hours. The tour normally showcast the main protagonists of the independent alternative rock scene, with a number of relatively unheard of bands usually supporting more mainstream acts. A number of previous support acts on the tour went on to become very successful commercially, such as Arctic Monkeys (support act in 2006) and Franz Ferdinand (who played the opening slot in 2004). From 2005, the tour was sponsored by unisex hair product company ShockWaves.

In 2007, the main NME Awards tour was split into two different tours of four bands each. The first tour, the ShockWaves NME Indie Rock Tour was created to reflect the growing indie rock scene in Britain throughout 2006–2007. The second tour, the ShockWaves NME Indie Rave Tour, displays the small number of bands currently associated with the new rave music genre. NME editor Conor McNicholas stated that the reason for the tour split was to allow more fans to gain tickets to the Awards tour, and allow them to display more bands at the one time. The tours were played in a number of intertwined dates at the same time. This format was kept for one year, before reverting to one tour in 2008. In 2017, rather than organise a tour themselves, NME sponsored a series of previously announced headline dates by the band Blossoms. In 2018, for the first time in 23 years, an NME sponsored tour did not take place. Though NME are yet to make a statement about the cancellation of the tour, they have run articles about the demise of the Warped Tour on their website.

- 2017: Blossoms, Cabbage, Rory Wynne
- 2016: Bloc Party, Drenge, Ratboy, Bugzy Malone
- 2015: Palma Violets, Fat White Family, Slaves, The Wytches
- 2014: Interpol, Temples, Royal Blood, Circa Waves
- 2013: Django Django, Miles Kane, Palma Violets, Peace
- 2012: Two Door Cinema Club, Metronomy, Tribes, Azealia Banks
- 2011: Crystal Castles, Magnetic Man, Everything Everything, The Vaccines,
- 2010: The Maccabees, Bombay Bicycle Club, The Big Pink, The Drums
- 2009: Glasvegas, Friendly Fires, White Lies, Florence and the Machine
- 2008: The Cribs, Joe Lean and the Jing Jang Jong, Does It Offend You, Yeah?, The Ting Tings
- 2007:
  - ShockWaves NME Indie Rock Tour: The Automatic, The View, The Horrors, Mumm-Ra
  - ShockWaves NME Indie Rave Tour: Klaxons, CSS, The Sunshine Underground, New Young Pony Club
- 2006: Maxïmo Park, Arctic Monkeys, We Are Scientists, Mystery Jets
- 2005: The Killers, The Futureheads, Bloc Party, Kaiser Chiefs
- 2004: Funeral for a Friend, The Rapture, The Von Bondies, Franz Ferdinand
- 2003: The Datsuns, The Polyphonic Spree, Interpol, The Thrills
- 2002: Andrew W.K., Lostprophets, Black Rebel Motorcycle Club, The Coral
- 2001: Amen, JJ72, Alfie, Starsailor
- 2000: Shack, Les Rythmes Digitales, Campag Velocet, Coldplay
- 1999: UNKLE, Idlewild, Delakota, Llama Farmers
- 1998: Stereophonics, Asian Dub Foundation, The Warm Jets, Theaudience
- 1997: Geneva, Symposium, Tiger, Three Colours Red
- 1996: The Bluetones, The Cardigans, Heavy Stereo, Fluffy
- 1995: Veruca Salt, Marion, Skunk Anansie, 60 Ft. Dolls

== NME Radar Tour ==
The NME Radar Tour (formerly known as the Topman NME New Noise Tour in 2008, and the Topman NME New Music Tour before 2008) has taken place in venues throughout the United Kingdom since 2005. The tour is played by relatively unknown bands to gain them more mainstream exposure. In 2009, a second "Autumn Radar Tour" took place during September and October. In 2014, the event was rebranded the NME New Breed Tour; NME and headliners Superfood handpicked a different support act for each night of the tour. The tour did not return in 2015.

- 2014: Superfood, Honeyblood
- 2013: Cerebral Ballzy, The Amazing Snakeheads, The Bohicas, Fat White Family
- 2012: Howler, The Cast of Cheers, Gross Magic
- 2011 (Spring): Anna Calvi, Grouplove, Big Deal, The Collectable Few, The History of Apple Pie
- 2010 (Autumn): The Joy Formidable, Chapel Club, Flats, Wilder
- 2010: Hurts, Everything Everything, Darwin Deez
- 2009 Autumn Radar Tour: Golden Silvers, Marina and the Diamonds, Local Natives, Yes Giantess
- 2009: La Roux, Magistrates, Heartbreak, The Chapman Family
- 2008: Crystal Castles, Friendly Fires, Team Waterpolo, White Lies
- 2007: The Rumble Strips, The Little Ones, Pull Tiger Tail, Blood Red Shoes
- 2006: Boy Kill Boy, The Automatic, ¡Forward, Russia!, The Long Blondes
- 2005: Maxïmo Park, Nine Black Alps, Boy Kill Boy, The Checks, The Cribs, Battle, The Rakes, Towers of London, The Vega Method

== O2/NME Rock 'N' Roll Riot Tour ==
Logo of the 2007 Rock 'n' Roll Riot Tour.

The NME Rock 'n' Roll Riot Tour (sponsored by O_{2}) started in 2003. The tour usually takes place later in the year compared to the main awards tours, taking place in September–October of each year. Some of the bands have even gone on to play in other NME Tours; The Horrors, following their support slot on the 2006 Riot Tour, would later play on the 2007 NME Awards Indie Rock Tour.

- 2008: Primal Scream, RTX^{1}, Cristine
- 2007: The Enemy, Lethal Bizzle, The Wombats
- 2006: The Fratellis, The Maccabees, The Horrors, The Dykeenies, Sohodolls
- 2005: Kaiser Chiefs, Maxïmo Park, The Cribs
- 2004: Razorlight, The Duke Spirit, Dogs
- 2003: Jet, The Hiss, Mr. David Viner, Miss S. Payne

^{1}Support for the tour was confirmed by Fused Magazine. Official support acts were never announced by NME.

=== NME Rock 'N' Roll Riot Tour (United States) ===
On 20 August 2007, NME announced they would be adding a further Rock 'n' Roll Tour, this time as a tour of the US. The inaugural tour features mainly bands from areas of the US, such as New York City, Brooklyn and Los Angeles.

- 2007: The Hold Steady, Art Brut, Demander, Federale, The Blood Arm, 1990s

== NME Freshers Tour ==
The NME Freshers Tour is taking place around "Freshers week", the week in which Universities in the UK begin their first academic term. 2007 marks the debut of this tour.

- 2007: The Go! Team, Operator Please, The Satin Peaches

== NME New Rave Revolution Tour ==
The NME New Rave Revolution Tour was a tour that took place throughout September to October 2006. The line-up consisted of bands who were closely related to the "new rave" music scene which appeared throughout 2006. Klaxons would go on to headline the Indie Rave leg of the NME Awards Tour in February 2007

It is unknown whether or not another New Rave Revolution Tour will take place, due to the small number of bands and the short-lived nature of the genre.

- 2006: Klaxons, SHITDISCO, Datarock
