= Dance Lessons =

British pop, jazz, soul band

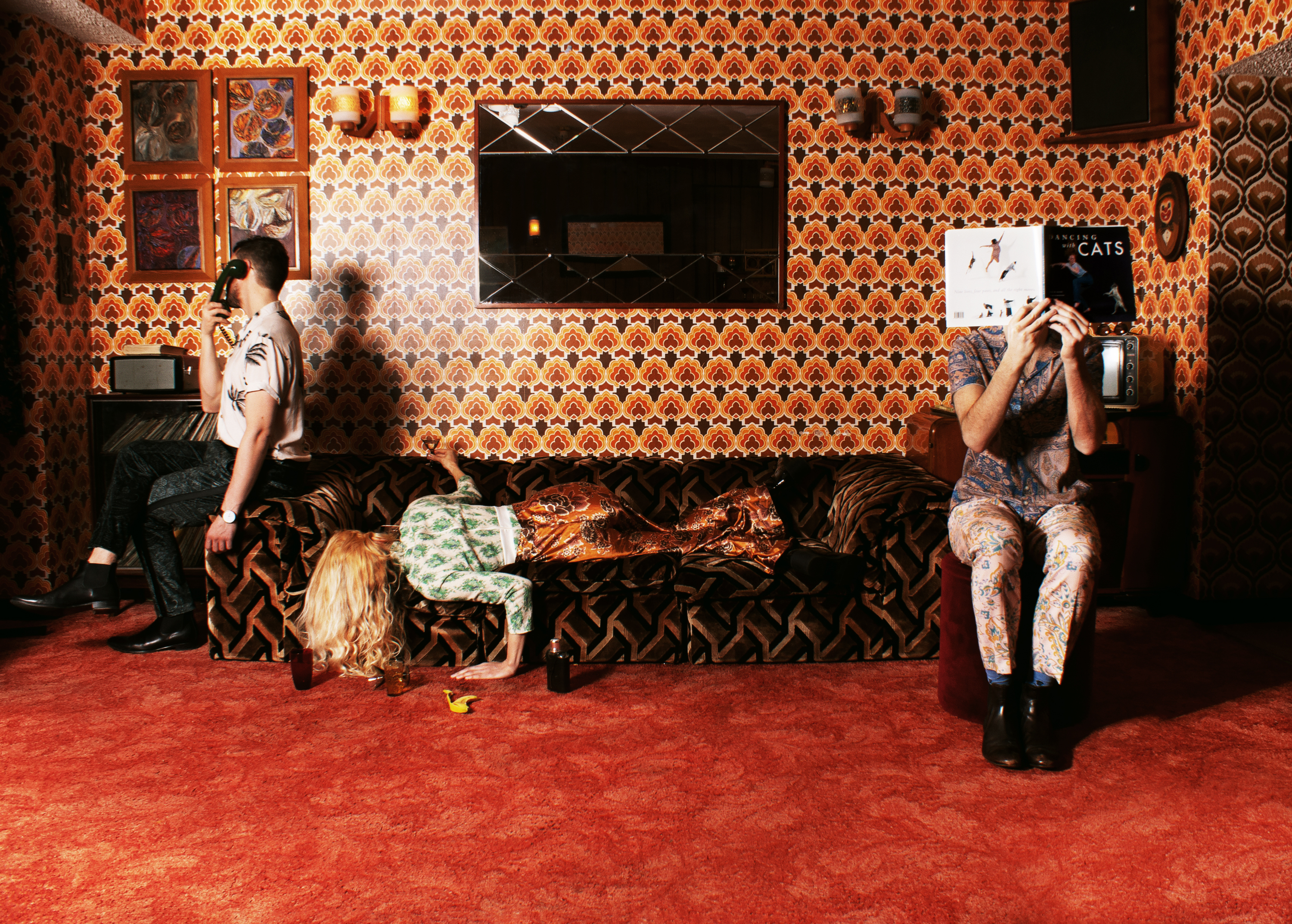

Background information
- Origin: London, England
- Genres: alt-pop; experimental pop; jazz; neo soul
- Labels: Exotic Creatures, Spinnup / Universal Music Group (distribution)

Dance Lessons is an international music collective whose sound combines pop, electro, jazz, indie and neo soul. The project is led by singer and producer Anne Freier, alongside bassist and backing vocalist Tom Christensen and guitarist Nat Cantor. To date, Dance Lessons have released seven singles and one full-length album.

== History ==
Anne, formerly of I Am Harlequin, met Tom Christensen in late 2019 at a house party where they got discussing a mutual love of disco, jazz and an interest to start a new musical project. Christensen and Cantor, who had previously played in the XL Recordings-backed indie band The Collectable Few and toured with Karima Francis as part of her live band for several years, were driven by a desire to create new music that blurred the lines between alt-pop and jazz. This led the three collaborators into the studio to start working on new material.

The trio released their first single 'SMABTO' (Some Mistakes Are Better Than Others), a jazz-infused, dance-pop song in 2020 to positive reviews from The Fader and The Line of Best Fit.

After writing and recording several more tracks in Anne's East London studio, the group began conversations with New York-based mixer-producer Andrew Maury, with Maury later mixing Dance Lessons' new batch of songs. The result was the collective's second single 'New Job'. The music video to the song was shot in Los Angeles during the COVID-19 lockdown by director Sarah Chatfield and premiered in June of 2020 on COMPLEX.

The group's third single 'Just Chemistry', was released in 2021, for which the group was awarded 'Best of 2021' by US music publication Earmilk, which stated, "Despite their newcomer status, Dance Lessons exudes a magnetic, sultry allure that could soundtrack almost any situation." The song was also added to BBC Radio 1's regular rotation, being named Jack Saunders Future Artists 'Tune of The Week' and praised by Jess Iszatt's BBC Music Introducing show as a band who "ooze confidence and sexiness".

In 2021, Anne was featured in Atwood Magazine for Women's History Month, where she discussed being a female producer in a male dominated industry. On July 25th, the band released their debut album Beginners on the Exotic Creatures label; launched with a sold-out show at The Waiting Room in Stoke Newington; a limited 250 LP vinyl pressing also sold out within a week of its release.

== Associated musicians ==
- Anne Freier – vocals, piano, keyboards, synths, drum programming, production, engineering
- Tom Christensen – bass, vocals
- Nat Cantor – guitars, synths, vocals
- Clark Hogan-Taylor – keyboards, vocals
- John Harris – live and recorded drums
- Duncan Eagles – live and recorded saxophone
- Yasmin Ogilvie – live saxophone
- Alex Bone – recorded saxophone
- Ben Grossman – recorded saxophone
- Alex Hammond – recorded drums
