= The Mojo Fins =

British band

- Origin: Brighton, England
- Genres: Rock, pop, indie pop
- Years active: 2004–present
- Label: Amazon Records
- Members: Stephen Brett; Steve Hoile; Dave Russell; Adam Luke Atkins
- Past members: Jon Chandler
- Website: www.themojofins.co.uk

The Mojo Fins are a British band, based in Brighton, who are currently signed to Amazon Records.

== History ==
Their debut single "Piñata Face" was released in September 2007. The song was penned by former bandmate Jon Chandler, who died in a road accident in spring 2007, prompting the band to donate all proceeds of the release to the charity, RoadPeace.

Their debut album, The Sound I Still Hear, was released in 2009 on Amazon Records. The single, "In The Script", was issued in July that year.

The Mojo Fins released their second album, Shake The Darkness in Summer 2011. Recording took place at Rockfield Studios in Wales, with record producer, Dave Eringa. The band released three singles from the album, "The Spell", "Owning My Condition" and "Lighthouse".

The Spirit EP, also recorded at Rockfield Studios and produced and mixed by Eringa, was released on 27 May 2012.

Their third album is Circa (2014).
