= Major Major (band) =

English indie rock band from Liverpool

- Origin: Liverpool, England
- Genre: Indie rock
- Years active: 2006–2011
- Label: Unsigned
- Members: Conor Clarke; Neil Owen; Louis Cooper; James Knight
- Website: majormajor.co.uk

Major Major were an English indie rock band from Liverpool, England, formed in 2006 by Conor Clarke, Neil Owen, Louis Cooper and James Knight.

== History ==
On 4 January 2008, Major Major became the first band to perform at the Liverpool Echo Arena, where they supported The Farm in front of ambassadors for European Capital of Culture 2008.

The group reached the final of Now That's What We Call Culture on 8 August 2008, which was held at the Liverpool Echo Arena. The band reached the final after progressing through heats judged by Phil Redmond and Jennifer Ellison.

=== Glastonbury 2009 ===
Major Major became the first confirmed act for Glastonbury Festival 2009, after winning the Rockstar Bands competition on 5 September 2008. The competition was backed by the Glastonbury Festival organiser Michael Eavis and Peter Gabriel. As winners of the competition, they also played a live set at the Pilton Equinox Party on Friday 18 September – along with Franz Ferdinand and The Ting Tings.

== Band members ==
- Conor Clarke – Vocals and guitar
- Neil Owen – Lead guitar and vocals
- Louis Cooper – Bass guitar and vocals
- James Knight – Drums
- Liam Dobie - Drums

== Track listing ==
Promo CD 1
No.	Title	Length
1.	"Elephant in the Room"	2:39
2.	"Lady Salsa"	2:22
3.	"Now You've Done it"	2:40
4.	"Play the idiot"	3:22
5.	"Colours"	3:08
Total length:		14:34

Promo CD 2
No.	Title	Length
1.	"Window Shopping"	0:00
2.	"Talk in Your Sleep"	0:00
3.	"Heart Attack"	0:00
4.	"Who's Who"	0:00
5.	"Lights Out"	0:00
6.	"Made up my Mind"	0:00
7.	"Poser"	0:00
8.	"Were Coming Alive"	0:00
Total length:		00:00
