= Out of the Ordinary Festival =

Music festival in Hailsham, Sussex, England

Coordinates: 50.8574°N 0.2278°E

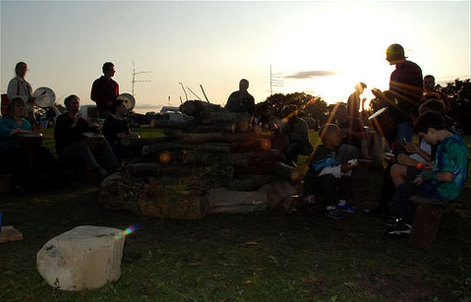
- Genre: Folk music, electronic music, ambient music, techno, house, pop music, dubstep, world music.
- Locations: Knockhatch Park, Hailsham, Sussex, England
- Years active: 2007–2013
- Website: outoftheordinaryfestival.com

The Out of the Ordinary Festival was an annual family- and eco-friendly music festival near Hailsham in the Sussex countryside. From 2007 to 2013 it celebrated the autumn equinox in England with a variety of live music, talks and workshops, performances, activities for children with green and ethical businesses, many powered by solar panels and wind generators. It started as a development of The Antiquarian Society in Brighton. The festival took place for three days in the autumn and had a capacity of 5,000 people. The festival was held at Knockhatch Park, a setting which comprises an ex-landfill site).

== Festival details ==
The Out of the Ordinary business was started by Stuart Mason and his partner Emily in 2007 on the Sussex Downs near the vale of the Long Man of Wilmington.

Workshops and talks included such topics as prehistoric culture, ancient knowledge and earth mysteries. This included yoga, meditation, alternative healing and the chance to use a variety of telescopes, a planetarium and laser guided tours of the constellations. Notable speakers include Professor Gordon Hillman, Jonathan Cainer, Andy Thomas, Edmund Marriage, Leo Rutherford and Robert Bauval.

The festival was divided into seven areas named after each of the seven chakras. The music area was appropriately named the throat chakra with two stages, the Ootopia and Peace Stage, as well as an indoor bar and the Conscious Cabaret. In 2011, the site had a new, simplified layout comprising the four elements, though still paying tribute to the seven chakras that defined its inner workings. The festival has an eclectic mix of music ranging from folk to reggae and electronic and DJs. Sussex Downs College co-sponsored a solar-powered music stage at the festival in 2010.

== Music ==
Out of the Ordinary Festival has featured many acts that are well known in the alternative scene. Notable performers include:

- 2007 (21–23 September): Small White Light, Maya, The Drookit Dogs.
- 2008 (12–14 September): Banco de Gaia, Katharine Blake, The Burlettes
- 2009 (18–20 September): Zub Zub (Zia Geelani, formerly of the Ozric Tentacles), Eat Static, Celt Islam, The Dolmen, Banco de Gaia, DJ Paygan, Turiya.
- 2010 (17–19 September): Dr. Alex Patterson from The Orb, Andy Barlow from Lamb, Seize The Day, Nucleus Roots, King Porta Stomp.
- 2011 (23–25 September): System 7, Fujiya & Miyagi, Zub Zub (Zia Geelani, formerly of the Ozric Tentacles), Orchid Star.

== See also ==
- List of electronic music festivals
