= Ruth Theodore =

British alt-folk singer-songwriter

Ruth Theodore

Ruth Theodore is a British alt-folk singer-songwriter and multi-instrumentalist signed to Ani DiFranco's Righteous Babe Records. She plays guitar, piano and violin. Her music incorporates elements of folk-blues, ragtime and jazz poetry. She released her first three albums through River Rat Records, beginning with Worm Food in 2007. She recorded Cactacus with producer Todd Sickafoose and released I Am I Am through Righteous Babe Records in 2024.

== Early life and musical beginnings ==
Theodore recalled growing up in a household where poetry and visual art were a greater presence than recorded music. Her father introduced her to poetry and literature. She and her sister trained in classical violin, and Theodore reached Grade 8. Her sister introduced her to the music of Tracy Chapman and Sheryl Crow, and later to Balkan music, which helped inspire Theodore's band Victor Menace.

At 14, Theodore began busking in Southampton. She taught herself guitar, experimented with tunings and developed her early songs by ear. She also played in clubs and bars. She recalled that when gigs ended too late for her to get home, she sometimes slept in the same shop doorway where she busked. In a 2017 fRoots profile, she spoke about the help she received from people she met while busking. She worked in a music shop, setting up and demonstrating instruments, and recalled that meeting guitarist Leo Kottke there encouraged her to develop her technique. At 17, she went to Winchester to study sociology, history and performing arts with music, and continued busking there.

In her early twenties, Theodore lived briefly in Edinburgh before moving to London. In Hackney, she and her sister rented an artists' studio where they lived and worked. Her sister painted there, and Theodore used the space to start a band and rehearse. The musician who rented them the studio introduced her to the idea of living on a boat. A friend helped her find one in Newbury, and she took it to Hackney. Theodore later described living on a boat moored on squatted land in East London.

In a 2024 interview with Just Listen To This, Theodore said she had spent much of her life living in squats. Asked which novel she would choose to score for a film, she picked John Steinbeck's Tortilla Flat, saying its characters reminded her of people she had lived among.

== Career ==
In 2007, Theodore formed the instrumental group Victor Menace, playing violin alongside saxophonist Alejandro Toledo. That year she also released her solo debut, Worm Food, through River Rat Records. The 2009 Glastonbury Festival programme listed Victor Menace and Theodore separately on the Shangri-La bill.

Her second album, White Holes of Mole Hills, followed in 2010. Reviewing it for The Guardian, Robin Denselow noted the shifts between cabaret and spoken delivery on “Eris”. Theodore released her third album, Dear Lamp Love Moth, in 2013. Denselow's review discussed its changes in mood and tempo, and Thomas Blake also reviewed the album for KLOF Mag.

In 2013, Theodore founded Live at the Hyde, an independent music venue in Winchester. Her work there included programming concerts and live sound engineering. Artists who have performed at the venue include Martin Carthy, Andy Irvine, Rory McLeod, Chastity Brown, Hamell on Trial and Michele Stodart.

Theodore supported DiFranco at Union Chapel in London. DiFranco recommended Theodore to producer Todd Sickafoose. Encouraged by her mentor Ian Blackaby, Theodore sent Sickafoose demos, and he invited her to the United States to record.

Theodore recorded her fourth album, Cactacus (2016), in Oregon with Sickafoose. Released through Aveline Records, the album featured Rob Burger on organ, Mathias Künzli on percussion and Jenny Scheinman on violin. “You Can’t Help Who You Love” was the first single. Denselow noted the album's Americana elements and the rapid, partly spoken delivery on “Man of the Land”. FATEA discussed the Americana influences in its instrumentation and arrangements.

In October 2016, Tom Robinson selected “You Can’t Help Who You Love” for the BBC Introducing Mixtape.

Theodore appeared as a guest at several of DiFranco's London shows. In July 2017, she and her band opened for DiFranco at the London Palladium, where their set included “You Can’t Help Who You Love” and “Everything Is Temporary”. In May 2019, she shared bills with Hamell on Trial at the Greystones in Sheffield and the Eagle Inn in Greater Manchester.

Theodore studied orchestration in 2020.

In 2023, River Rat Records released Cherry Picker, a compilation of Theodore's earlier recordings. Reviewing it for Americana UK, John Jenkins praised the lyrics while questioning some of the arrangement choices. Also in 2023, Theodore was featured on the single edit of Hamell on Trial's “Jelly”, included on Bring the Kids.

Righteous Babe Records announced Theodore's signing in February 2024 and released I Am I Am on 3 May. Theodore played guitar and piano and co-produced the album with Sickafoose and Künzli. Eli Crews recorded and mixed it at Spillway Sound in New York state. Theodore and Peggy Seeger share a lyric credit on “People People”. Theodore received an Arts Council England grant to develop choral compositions for a gospel choir. She said that working with the choir influenced the vocal arrangement of “Hold On Me”. Three singers from the project, Abdul Shyllon, Jabez Walsh and Melody Brooks, contributed backing vocals to the album. In KLOF Mag, Mike Davies discussed the variety of styles across the album and described “Barbed Wire Fence”, which features a brass arrangement, as a song about the right to roam.

In March 2025, Theodore was billed as the opening act for Peter Mulvey at the Stoughton Opera House in Wisconsin. In April she shared bills with Hamell on Trial at Green Note in London and the Tin at the Coal Vaults in Coventry. In August she appeared at the Purbeck Valley Folk Festival, where she was also listed for the Songwriters Circle. The presenter Passim also lists Rory McLeod and Chastity Brown among the artists Theodore has performed with.

In January 2026, Theodore was an official showcase artist at the Folk Alliance International conference in New Orleans. In March, she was billed with Katie Dahl at the Zero to Fierce Festival in California.

Ruth Live at Seattle's Neptune Theatre, Apr '26

Ruth Performing 'Man of the Land' at The Freight, Berkley

From 2 to 17 April 2026, Theodore opened for Dar Williams on a run of US dates on Williams's Hummingbird Highway tour. The run included the Mount Baker Theatre in Bellingham, the Neptune Theatre in Seattle, the Aladdin Theater in Portland, the Hult Center for the Performing Arts in Eugene, the Center for the Arts in Grass Valley, two nights at The Freight in Berkeley, the Troubadour in West Hollywood, the Arts Campus at Willits in Basalt, and the Armory in Fort Collins. Reviewing the 3 April Seattle concert for Glide Magazine, Gabriel Scheer described Theodore singing from among the audience during her opening set and reported that she joined Williams on “I Am the One Who Will Remember Everything” and “Iowa (Traveling III)”.

In July 2026, Theodore performed on WFMT's Folkstage in Chicago. She was billed for five sets at Mile of Music in Appleton, Wisconsin, including one at Lawrence Memorial Chapel. In August 2026, she was a guest songwriter at Williams's Writing a Song That Matters retreat in Chester, Connecticut.

In October 2026, Theodore performed at the Lotus World Music and Arts Festival in Bloomington, Indiana. During the festival, she recorded a Lotus Live session at WFHB's Firehouse on 3 October.

Theodore was selected as an official showcase artist for the 2027 Folk Alliance International conference in Chicago.

== Musical style ==
Reviewing Theodore's early work, Denselow identified the influence of Leo Kottke's folk-blues guitar playing and of jazz poetry. He noted that her songs combine sung melodies with spoken passages and instrumental breaks, and identified ragtime influences and alternate guitar tunings on Dear Lamp Love Moth. On I Am I Am, Theodore played guitar and piano and worked with Künzli on the string and brass arrangements. Künzli also played drums and percussion on the album.

Theodore has named Ani DiFranco, Paul Simon, David Bowie, Joni Mitchell and Hamell on Trial as influences on her development as a guitarist. She described her approach to piano as improvisational and cited Keith Jarrett, Erik Satie and Nina Simone.

== Discography ==
=== Studio albums ===
- Worm Food (2007)
- White Holes of Mole Hills (2010)
- Dear Lamp Love Moth (2013)
- Cactacus (2016)
- I Am I Am (2024)

=== Compilation albums ===
- Cherry Picker (2023)
