= The Alfonz =

English rock band

- Origin: Swindon, Wiltshire, England, UK
- Genres: Rock
- Years active: 2006 – 2010
- Label: Unsigned
- Past members: Adam Wiltshire; Sam Lee; Charlie Rowe

The Alfonz was a rock band from Swindon, Wiltshire, England. The band consisted of Adam Wiltshire (bass guitar, vocals, occasional keyboard), Sam Lee (guitar, vocals) and Charlie Rowe (drums, vocals).

== Origins, foundation and early career ==
Wiltshire, Lee and Rowe had been playing together in various bands ranging from pop punk to jazz for many years. They came together as Slow Mo and the Armbreakers in the summer of 2006, during learning to GCSE at Commonweal School. Later that year, they changed their name to The Alfonz. At first their set mainly consisted of covers, but before long they began writing their own material.

== The Alfonz EP (2007) ==
On 12 December 2007, The Alfonz released their debut self-titled EP, which included four songs:

1. "Summer Sun"
2. "Light of Day"
3. "Willis"
4. "Give It Up"

== Growing with live performances (2007–2009) ==
The Alfonz played "Summer Sun" in Zane Lowe radio show in BBC Radio 1, on 27 November 2007, before the EP was released. Following the release of the EP, The Alfonz embarked on a mini-tour to promote it, playing at London Water Rats, Bristol, Louisiana, Oxford Port Mahon and The Victoria in Swindon. In the following months they continued to play live across the south of the UK, building up a larger fan base.

After seeing The Alfonz live at the Bull & Gate in London in 2008, Martyn Berg told Colin Lester about them, and soon after The Alfonz were being managed by CLM Entertainment under Lester. In the summer of 2008, The Alfonz went on another mini-tour, this time around the south coast of England. The Alfonz also experimented with recording techniques around this time, with Stuart Rowe and Andy Partridge (XTC) co-producing.

In early 2009, The Alfonz began being played regularly on BBC Radio 1 and BBC 6 Music, by DJs such as Tom Robinson and Huw Stephens. In March Radio 1's Big Weekend came to Swindon. The Alfonz were selected by Radio One DJs, including Huw Stephens, to headline the opening night of the Fringe Festival at Swindon's 12 Bar. A couple of months later The Alfonz were asked by the BBC to play on the BBC Introducing Stage at Glastonbury Festival. Following this, London's Dirty Boots Club asked The Alfonz to play on their stage at Glastonbury as well.

== First two singles (2009–2010) ==
The Alfonz released their debut single, "Sitting on Your Radiator", on 10 August 2009, and went on their first UK tour in September to promote it. The single included the original song, a remix and a life performance on BBC Wiltshire Introducing.

On 12 April 2010 The Alfonz released their second single, "One Minute Longer".

== Breaking up and Jumble Sale ==
On 13 August 2010, The Alfonz officially broke up, playing a final sell out gig as part of the Swindon Shuffle. They produced a free EP, Jumble Sale which was available at their last two gigs.

== One Night Reunion ==
On 3 October 2014, The Alfonz had an impromptu reunion, playing two songs at Adam Wiltshire's wedding.

== Songwriting and recording ==
The Alfonz wrote all of their songs collectively. With a few exceptions, such as "Sitting on your Radiator", which was recorded at Moles Studio in Bath, all tracks are recorded at Lighterthief Studios in Swindon, produced by The Alfonz and Stuart Rowe (father of Charlie Rowe, one of the band members.

== Discography ==
- The Alfonz EP (2007)
- "Sitting on Your Radiator" (2009)
- "One Minute Longer" (2010)
- Jumble Sale (2010)
