= Let's Buy Happiness =

- Origin: Newcastle, England
- Genres: Indie folk, indie pop
- Years active: 2009–2014
- Labels: self released
- Website: letsbuyhappiness.com/

Let's Buy Happiness were a British alternative rock music group. The group consisted of Sarah Hall (vocals), James Hall (guitar/keys), Graeme Martin (guitars), Mark Brown (bass) and James King (drums). They began playing local shows in hometown Newcastle, England. Their first EP No Hot Ashes was self-released and received national success. Following this came singles Six Wolves, Fast Fast and Dirty Lakes. The band have twice been invited to the Maida Vale Studios for both BBC Radio 6 Music and BBC Radio 1. Dirty Lakes has also been included on Spotify's Songs of 2011 list. Their tour manager was Alex King who is the brother of former drummer, James King - their father is Hairy Biker Simon King.

Within a year of playing their debut show in a small Newcastle pub, the band played at the Glastonbury Festival 2010 on the John Peel stage alongside Foals, Florence and the Machine, The xx and Mumford and Sons.

== Touring ==
As well as supporting Primal Scream at Electric Brixton for a one-off show, Let's Buy Happiness toured the UK twice in 2011 with the indie-pop band Frankie and The Heartstrings and We Were Promised Jetpacks. The band has also supported Idlewild, The Temper Trap, Vivian Girls, Health, Sky Larkin and The Futureheads.

== 2012 ==
In 2012 the band returned to the studio to produce new material themselves quoting "With this new EP in the New Year, everyone’s going to see what we’re about. It’s a fresh start."

== 2014 ==
Let's Buy Happiness announced their split in April 2014, playing a final show at The Cluny on 18 July.
