= The Destroyers (band) =

British folk punk band

Background information
- Origin: Birmingham, England
- Genres: Folk punk, Gypsy punk
- Years active: 2006–present
- Labels: Destruction Records, Transition Records
- Website: www.thedestroyers.co.uk

The Destroyers are a 15-strong music collective from Birmingham, England, that plays gypsy and balkan inspired "turbo-folk". The band has released 3 long play albums and regularly plays live gigs and music festivals.

== History ==
The group was founded by Louis Robinson in 2006 in the area of Speedwell Road, Birmingham, and features a line-up that typically includes c. 13-15 members, comprising brass, string, wind, percussion and gong sections. A number of the band members had studied at the Birmingham Conservatoire. From 2006 to 2012 the poet and musician Paul Murphy, who was known for his signature fez and being the founder of the Songwriter's Cafe in Birmingham, was the lead singer of the group. In 2016 Murphy, aged 66 years, died from cancer.

The band have been called "“doom-pah” folk-punk legends", and their sound compared to that of Bellowhead, Gogol Bordello, and Loose Tubes. The Destroyers are known for their live performances, playing c. 20-40 gigs per year, and have played at a number of festivals including Glastonbury, Womad, Wychwood Festival, and the Cambridge Folk Festival. They were featured on BBC West Midlands in 2010. In 2022 they performed at the opening ceremony for the Commonwealth Games in Birmingham.

The Destroyers' first single, "Out of Babel", was written by Murphy and released in 2009. It was called a "riotous celebration of multicultural Birmingham", and one of the songs "least likely to be adopted as an anthem by the BNP". Their similarly named first album, Out of Babel, was released the same year and according to the music website The Line of Best Fit it "positively enlightened the British press with its originality and energy", though in their own review Daniel Offen stated that while the Destroyers are "insane and we love them", the novelty did tend to "wear off".

Their second album, Hole In The Universe was released in 2012 to positive critical reception. Journalist Sid Smith stated that, while an "album probably isn’t the best medium through which to experience their brand of wryly manufactured mayhem", that Paul Murphy's "gravel-voiced insights are both humorous and thought-provoking". The Destroyers' third album, The Massive Gong, has been reported as "critically acclaimed".

== Discography ==
=== Albums ===
- Out of Babel (2009)
- Hole In The Universe (2012)
- The Massive Gong (2017)
- Argonaut (2025)

=== EPs ===
- Vortex (2015)
- Licence to Sing (2016)
- Captain Borglet's Escape to the Hidden Lands (2020)
