= Bandstand Busking =

Bandstand Busking is a project based in London, England showcasing musicians on some of the city's underused bandstands. The sessions are recorded and shown for viewing on the Bandstand Busking website and YouTube channel. The first session was recorded in March 2008 with the artist Stars of Sunday League; dozens of acts have since performed in bandstands for the project, including local bands such as Fanfarlo and Alessi's Ark and some from further afield such as Of Montreal and Black Lips.

Initially the performances were recorded without an audience, but at the beginning of 2009 the time and location of forthcoming gigs started to be announced on the website.

The event developed into a monthly show at the bandstand in the Northampton Square in Islington. It has not taken place since May 2018, and the project has not been active since August of that year.

== Artists (partial list) ==
- Stars of Sunday League
- School of Language
- The Week That Was
- Wet Paint
- Johnny Flynn
- Wild Beasts
- David Karsten Daniels
- Laura Groves
- Frightened Rabbit (solo)
- The Wave Pictures
- Broadcast 2000
- The Acorn
- We Were Promised Jetpacks
- Of Montreal
- The Barker Band
- Tap Tap
- Nat Johnson
- Hatchie
- Chris Bathgate
- Paul Marshall
- Left With Pictures
- Tom Brosseau
- The Twilight Sad
- Asobi Seksu
- Psapp
- Loney Dear
- The Leisure Society
- Emmy the Great
- Esser
- Gregory and the Hawk
- Speech Debelle
- Black Lips
- Alessi's Ark
- The Hours
- Hauschka
- Wildbirds & Peacedrums
- Slow Club
- Brakes
- Theoretical Girl
- Fanfarlo
- Kill It Kid
- Lulu and the Lampshades
