= Murray Lachlan Young =

British poet and performer

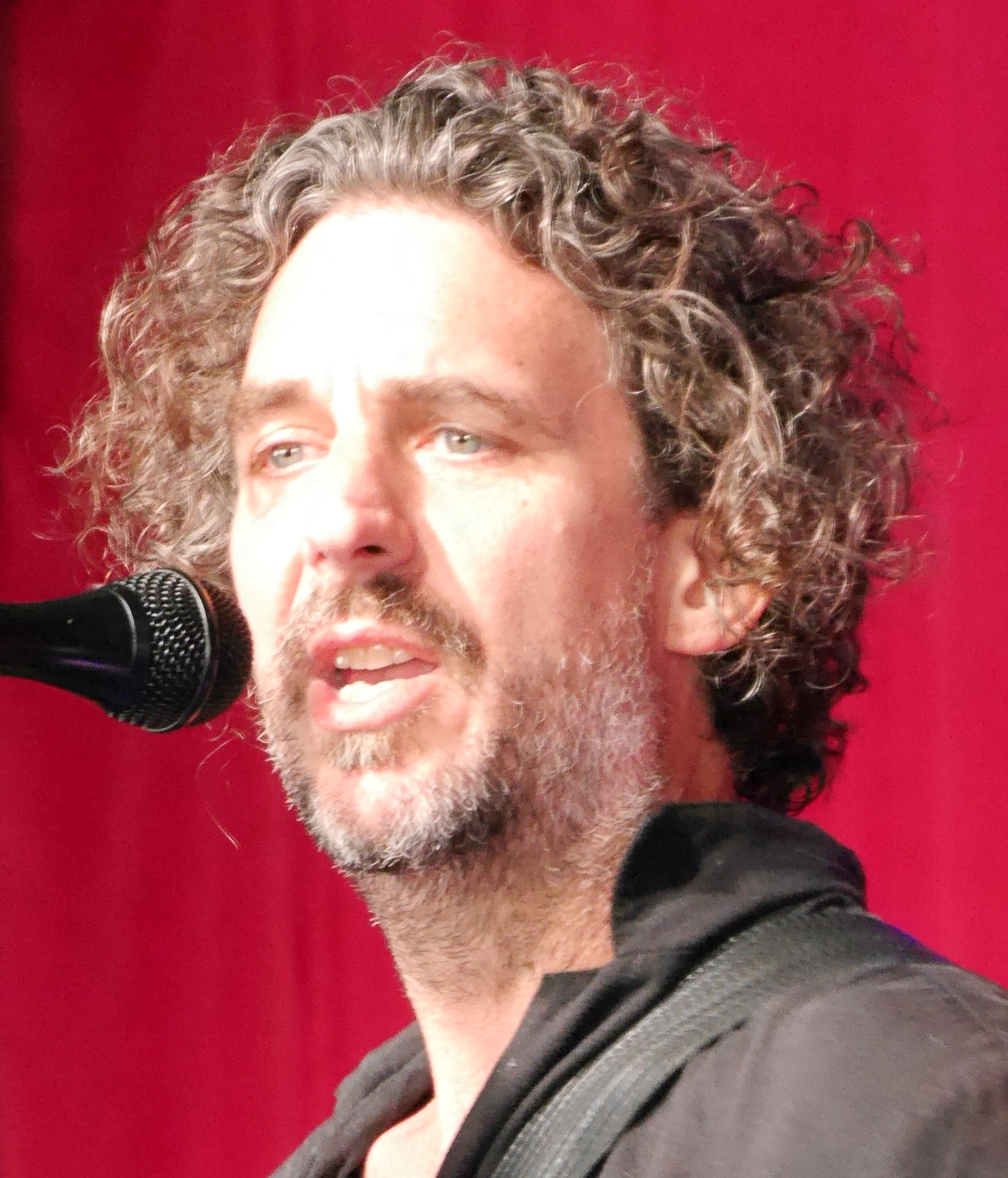
- Murray Lachlan Young, Glastonbury Festival, 2019
- Born: 14 March 1969 (age 57); United States
- Occupation: Poet
- Website: www.murraylachlanyoung.co.uk

Murray Lachlan Young (born 14 March 1969) is a British poet, stand-up performer, broadcaster, playwright and screenwriter, and he is also a children's author who has worked extensively in schools. He came to prominence during the Britpop era of the mid-1990s, when he became the only poet to sign a recording contract worth £1m.

== Personal life ==
Young graduated from University of Salford. In 1998, he married singer Zoë Pollock; they have two children.

== Performances ==
Live solo shows include:

- UK solo headline tours (2014 & 2016)
- Glastonbury Festival of Performing Arts (1996–present, except 2015)
- MTV Music Awards, US (1997)
- T in the Park Festival (1998 & 2001)
- Port Elliot Festival (2005–present)
- Latitude Festival (2006, ’13 & ’15)
- Goodlife Festival (2013, ’14 & ’15)
- Brighton Festival (2014)
- The Wilderness Festival (2014)
- 6 Music Festival (2014–present)
- Festival No 6 (2015–present)
- Poet in residence at The Union Club, Soho, London (1997–present)
- Poet in residence at The Arts Club, Mayfair, London (2014–16)

== Books ==
- Vice & Verse (EMI, 1997) ISBN 978-1-85848-542-3
- Casual Sex and Other Verse (Bantam Books, 1997) ISBN 978-0-553-50693-8
- How Freakin' Zeitgeist Are You? (Unbound, 2017) ISBN 978-1-78352-353-5
- The Nine Dead Williams (publisher unknown, 2014)
- The Mystery of the Raddlesham Mumps (Scotland Street Press, 2018) ISBN 978-1-910895-26-9
- The Chronicles of Atom & Luna. Tales From The Forest. (Switched On Publishing, 2024) ISBN 978-1-3999-9378-4

== Stage, film, dance and audio recordings ==
Stage

- A Captive Audience (1992)
- The Fabulous Twister Brothers (1993)
- Modern Cautionary Tales for Children (2005)
- The Incomers (2013)
- Rehab (2016)

Film

Features:

- Under Milk Wood (co-written, 2015)
- God’s Work (in development)
- The Mystery of the Raddlesham Mumps
- Summerset (writing)

Shorts:

- Desideratum (1992)
- Little Sucker Thumb (adapted, 1993)
- Plunkett and McClean (Gallows poem, 1997)
- Annie McClue (2011)
- The Story of Martin (animation, in production)
- Lycra Dad (in production)

Dance

- Enjoy Your Stay (2010)
- Taste (2015)

Audio recordings

- Live at Ronnie Scotts (1995)
- The Lost Album (1995)
- Simply Everyone’s Taking Cocaine (1997)
- Vice & Verse (1997)
- Casual Sex (1998)
- Murray Lachlan Young - Live (2011)
- The Alien Balladeer (2013)

== Broadcasting ==
Radio

- Poet in residence, The Breakfast Show, LBC (1996)
- Poet in residence, BBC 6 Music (2011–present day)
- Poet in residence, Saturday Live, BBC Radio 4 (2006–14)
- Regular contributor to Loose Ends, BBC Radio 4 (1995–present day)
- Regular contributor to Kaleidescope, BBC Radio 4 (1995)
- Regular contributor to The Arts Show, BBC Radio 2 (2014–present day)
- Regular contributor to BBC Radio 5 Live, including special commissions for Test Match Special, Cheltenham Gold Cup and City v United (2012–15)
- Scotland meet Murray Lachlan Young, BBC Radio 4 (2013)
- Alien Balladeer, BBC Radio 4 series (2014)
- The Symphony of Medinah, Narrator, BBC Radio 5 Live (2014)
- Cern, BBC World Service (2015)

Television

- Murray Lachlan Young, MTV USA, series (1996)
- Vice Versa, BBC 2 television special (1997)
- Regular contributor, The Wright Stuff, Channel (2014–present)
- Contributor, Newsnight, BBC 2, (2014)

== Hartnoll & Young ==
In 2021, Murray Lachlan Young teamed up with Orbital's Paul Hartnoll for a lockdown inspired album called The Virus Diaries under the name Hartnoll & Young. In June 2021, the pair released a single from the album called "Garden Centre (Push the Trolley)" as a follow-up to "I Need a Haircut".
