= The Mad Cows =

British band

The Mad Cows are a folk/funk band formed in Stroud, UK. The band consists of Christian Guerrini (founder and creative director), Hamish Guerrini (vocals and guitar), Guy Guerrini (keyboards and vocals), Miles Guerrini (vocals), Andy Dunn (guitar), Spencer Hawes (bass guitar and double bass) and Caspar Cox (drums and percussion). The band was formed in 2000 by Hamish Guerrini. By 2001, the band had become a top festival act. Their success as a live act is greater than their success as a record-selling act. Free Cow - which was recorded over a 4-year period.

The Mad Cows were featured as special guests on Charles Hazlewood's show on BBC Radio 2 in 2007. He invited the band after being impressed by one of their performances at Glastonbury Festival.
