= Chief (band) =

American rock and folk band

- Origin: New York, New York
- Genres: Folk rock, rock, folk
- Years active: 2008-2013
- Labels: Chieftheband, Domino
- Past members: Evan Koga; Mike Moonves; Danny Fujikawa; Michael Fujikawa
- Website: chieftheband.com

Chief was a band from Santa Monica and Los Angeles, California, based in New York City. Chief has released three singles entitled "Mighty Proud," "Breaking Walls", and "Night and Day," as well as an EP called "The Castle Is Gone" and their debut and only full album, Modern Rituals. All of these releases (except for the EP which was released under their own record label) have been via Domino Records. They have been compared to bands such as Coldplay and Local Natives by The New York Times. The Times goes on to say "Mr. Koga can sound like the young Tom Petty." Other reviews of Chief have similarly been generally good. On June 14, 2011, they played their farewell show at The Troubadour but began performing together again one year later.

== History ==
=== Beginning: 2008–2009 ===
All four band members grew up in Los Angeles and attended school at New York University. When they first got to know each other, they were all working on various projects.

Before releasing any albums as Chief, they toured extensively. Their first EP, The Castle Is Gone, was self-released in 2008. The EP was reviewed positively by HearYa, who stated, "I am loving this band."

Their first single as well as first piece to be signed to Domino Records, "Mighty Proud", was released on November 17, 2009. The Fader stated, "they’ve earned their stripes (or patterns), with smoky hooks and group singalongs of tracks tailor-made for union rallies."

=== 2010 ===
In 2010, Chief continued to tour extensively, and released two singles and a full album. "Night And Day" was released on June 22, 2010, by Domino Records. Listen Before You Buy compares the "rich, layered" vocals to that of Band Of Horses.

"Breaking Walls" was released on June 29, again by Domino Records. This single was described by Contactmusic.com as "very melodic, has a lovely light jangly guitar loop paired with the occasionally subdued use of power chords backed by some very pert percussion," the vocals being "Verve like."

Their only album, Modern Rituals, was released on August 17, 2010, on Domino Records. Modern Rituals received average reviews. Rolling Stone gave the album 3 stars, and Spin gave them a 5 out of 10. Pitchfork Media gave the album a 5.2, stating, "Chief seem more or less like a bunch of hippies", and "Chief are rarely better than competent at anything they try to do here". The album also received positive reviews. Filter stated, "Considering how they got signed to Domino Records without even having a full length album makes you think, “Hey, these guys must be good.” In Modern Rituals, they prove exactly that." Paste gave the album a 7.2.

=== Break-up and reunion ===
On June 14, 2011, they played their farewell show at The Troubadour, shortly after announcing their breakup, which they said was "due to creative and personal differences."

In July 2012, Evan Koga announced via Twitter that Chief had reunited. They have resumed performing, mostly in the Los Angeles area.

== Members ==
- Evan Koga – lead vocals
- Mike Moonves – bass guitar
- Danny Fujikawa – guitar
- Michael Fujikawa – drums

== Discography ==
=== Studio albums ===
- Modern Rituals (August 17, 2010) (Domino Records)

=== Extended plays ===
- "The Castle Is Gone" (2008) (self-released)

=== Singles ===
- "Mighty Proud" (2009) (Domino Records)
- "Night and Day" (2010) (Domino Records)
- "Breaking Walls" (2010) (Domino Records)
