= Hope & Social =

English rock band

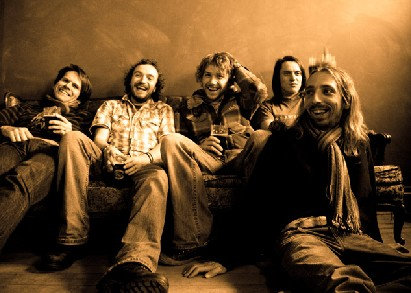

Background information
- Origin: Leeds, England
- Genres: Alternative rock
- Label: Alamo Music
- Members: Simon Wainwright; Rich Huxley; Ed Waring; Simon Fletcher; Gary Stewart; James Hamilton
- Past members: Mark Ashwell; Jason Miller; Simon Goff

Hope & Social (stylised as Hope&Social and formerly known as Four Day Hombre) are a rock band based in Leeds, England. Formed in 2008, they have released 3 albums in under three years and have toured extensively. Hope and Social are characterised by their "Pay What You Want" approach to their music.

== History ==
13 March 2006 saw the nationwide release of their debut album, Experiments in Living, as Four Day Hombre and through their own record label, Alamo Music.

The publicity activities accompanying the release of this album, along with the unusual history of Alamo Music, raised the profile of the band considerably during 2006. On 7 February 2006 they played a half-hour session on the Janice Long show on BBC Radio 2, which featured a number of live acoustic performances as well as a discussion with the band. The album release was followed by a tour of Barfly venues around Britain.

In the autumn of 2006 they toured the UK supporting Embrace and released the mini-album Fight Death. A tour of Canada was completed in March 2007, to support the release of Experiments in Living in that country. The tour included support slots for Canadian bands The Marble Index and The Miniatures.

On 15 May 2008, it was announced by the band that they were changing their name to Hope & Social, stating "same line-up, but with a different approach and sound". In July 2008, Hope & Social released their first EP with a full-length album to follow. On 7 October 2008, the band appeared on Channel M, a TV station based in Manchester. On 3 June 2009, the band released their new album, Architect of this Church. The album was in the making for 2 years and took over 16000 man hours to record. It was made available to purchase on their website, for however much the purchaser thinks it is worth.

In 2009, the band performed twice at Glastonbury as finalists in Glastonbury's Emerging Talent Competition. In April 2010, Hope and Social released April, their second full-length album and the first to feature fully the new line-up of the band. In May 2011, Hope and Social's third studio album Sleep Sound was released and immediately rose to No.1 on bandcamp.com.

In March 2012, the band released an album Cotton Wool & Knotted Wood, recorded live, and their fourth studio album All Our Dancing Days was released on 13 November 2012. The band kicked off the opening ceremony for the 2014 Tour de France at Leeds Arena, performing with The Band Anyone Can Join, consisting of 100 local people.

== Members ==
Current members:

- Simon Wainwright – vocals, guitar, piano
- Rich Huxley – guitar, cello, banjo, vocals, glockenspiel, piano
- Ed Waring – Rhodes, organ
- Gary Stewart – drums, vocals, piano, backing Vocals
- James Hamilton – brass, piano, glockenspiel, backing vocals
- Simon Fletcher – bass, sousaphone, backing vocals

Past members:

- Simon Goff – bass, strings

== Discography ==
- Self-recorded demo, 2000. Available on CD only; no catalogue number.

Track listing

1. "Tenth White Lie"
2. "Crying Shame"
3. "Christina's Song"
4. "Poor Substitute"
5. "Little Ditty"
6. "It's Happening to Me"
7. "Oh Katherine"
- Live 2000

Self-recorded demo, 2000. Available on CD only; no catalogue number.

Track listing

1. "Needed to Know"
2. "Small Talk"
3. "Don't Tell Me Now"
4. "Waiting for the Sun"
5. "Allow Me"
6. "Trace My Way"
7. "Friends Like You"
8. "Children's Shoes"

=== Official Hope & Social releases ===
- 2008: EP (EP)
- 2008: Live at the Blues Bar, Sunday 21 September
- 2009: Architect of This Church
- 2010: April
- 2011: Sleep Sound
- 2012: Cotton Wool & Knotted Wood
- 2012: All Our Dancing Days
- 2016: FEEL
- 2019: Happy Bread (and Cruel Hangovers)
- 2021: Jigsaw
- 2024: The Ride
- 2026: The World's Alright

==== As Four Day Hombre ====
- 2003: "The First Word Is the Hardest" (single)
- 2004: "Mr. M" (single)
- 2005: "1000 Bulbs" (single)
- 2005: Experiments in Living (album)
- 2006: "The First Word Is the Hardest" (single)
- 2006: "Don't Go Gently" (single)
- 2006: A Night at the Theatre (DVD)
- 2006: Fight Death (mini-album)
- 2008: One Foot Louder (album)

== Alamo Music ==
Alamo Music is the first ever fan funded, fan owned record label, created in 2004 as a conduit for Four Day Hombre's music.

A number of fans of the band invested the capital necessary to formalise the label, and to finance the recording and marketing of the Four Day Hombre debut album Experiments in Living. They hence became shareholders in Alamo. This 'fan-funded' approach has produced significant publicity for the band in national and regional press. For example, an article concerning the label and its formation was featured on the front page of the BBC website on 13 March 2006, the day of release of Experiments in Living.

The name Alamo was chosen in reference to the Battle of the Alamo. A quote from William Barret Travis, commander of the Texan forces at this battle, is printed on the inside of Experiments in Living: "I shall have to fight the enemy on his own terms."
