= Blackberry Wood =

Canadian musical group

- Origin: Vancouver, British Columbia, Canada
- Genres: Rock music, Folk Music, Ska
- Years active: 2006–present
- Members: Kris Mitchell; Anessa Marie; Jack Blaue
- Past members: Corinne "Coco" Culbertson; Katheryn Petersen; Justine Fisher; Michael Allyne; Amrit Basi; Jenn Hamer; Tim Sars; DeLisa Lewis; Jack Gortan; Jennifer Groover; Corinne Mundell; Duke Alexander; Coral Mercer; Bryan Davies; Jen Charters; Paul Hendricks
- Website: https://www.blackberrywoodmusic.com

Blackberry Wood is a musical group based in Vancouver, British Columbia, Canada. It consists of guitar, vocals, horn section, marching drum, percussion, and electronics. Depending on the event and their line-up, they will also perform with accordion and fiddle.

== History ==
The band was formed in 2006 as a two-piece, consisting of Kris Wood and Corinne CoCo. In 2007, the group expanded to a three-piece, and by the end of that year had become an eight-piece. In 2013, Blackberry Wood replaced the rhythm section (drums and Bass) with a steampunk instrument they call "The Contraption" and trimmed down to a 4 or 5 piece.

== Albums ==
Blackberry Wood's first album, a self-titled CD, was released in 2007. A remastered version of Travelling Horse Opry, featuring art from Vancouver artist Jordan Bent was released in May 2010. In 2012, the band released the album Strong Man vs Russian Bears. In 2015, a Halloween EP and a Christmas EP were released. In 2017, they released the album Pagan Circus.

== Performances ==
The group plays many festivals and clubs throughout western and northern Canada and the Pacific Northwest of the United States. In 2008, 2009, 2010, 2013, and 2015, Blackberry Wood toured the United Kingdom, including playing at Glastonbury Festival, and other festivals.
