= We Have Band =

British electronic music group

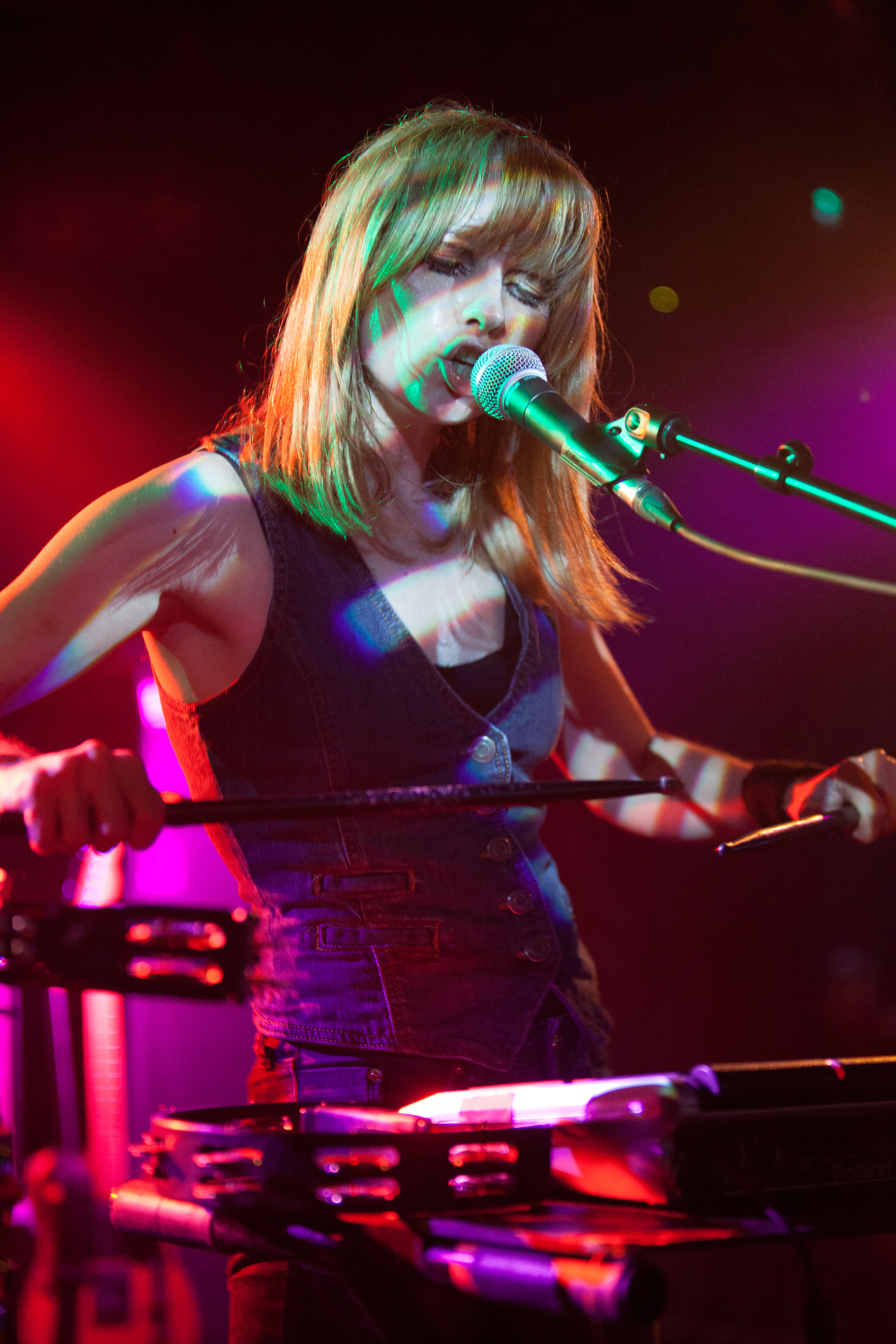
- Performing at the Montreux Jazz Festival, 2012

Background information
- Origin: Manchester/London, England
- Genres: Dance-punk, krautrock, indie rock, new wave
- Years active: 2007–2015
- Label: Naïve
- Spinoffs: Evadney
- Past members: Darren Bancroft; Thomas Wegg-Prosser; Dede Wegg-Prosser

We Have Band, also known as "WHB", was a three-piece electronic music group from Manchester and London consisting of Darren Bancroft (lead vocals, synthesizer, programming) and the husband-and-wife duo of Thomas (bass, guitar, synthesizer, programming, backing vocals) and Dede (synthesizer, percussion, backing vocals) Wegg-Prosser. They released three albums through the French-based Naïve Records. Their first album, WHB, was released on 5 April 2010 and a ten-track second album, Ternion, was released on 29 January 2012. We Have Band also remixed many artists, including Gorillaz, Bloc Party, Micachu, Peter Bjorn and John and M83.

== Career ==
=== 2007–2009: Early performances and singles ===
The band started playing in London in April 2008 at venues such as Club Mother Fucker, Dollop, YoYo, White Heat and Durr. In their early days they also made a number of festival appearances at events like Secret Garden Party, Glastonbury festival, SXSW, La Route du Rock, Rencontres Trans Musicales, Montreux Jazz Festival, CMJ, Berlin Festival and Art Basel Miami. This laid the foundations for the live following which saw the band tour solidly during 2009 and 2010. A highlight of their early live work was victory in the Glastonbury Festival emerging band competition in March 2009.

The band released its first single, "Oh!", in November 2008 on the 50bones records label, notable for releasing early singles by Little Boots, and The Virgins. The single received much critical acclaim. This Is Faked DIY described it as "the most chilled disco-funk ever" and as "Kraftwerk running for the bus". Oh! was remixed by Yo Majesty and Micachu & The Shapes. The video for this release was directed by Tom Ellis. "Oh!" was followed by "You Came Out" which was released on the Kill 'em All label in June 2009. Its video was directed by David Wilson who has also directed videos for Metronomy and Little Boots. There were a number of remixes for "You Came Out", including ones by Stereogamus and Blamma Blamma!. The Kitsuné label were early fans of the band and two tracks were included on the Kitsuné Maison compilations. "Hear It In The Cans" appeared on Maison 6 and "Time After Time" on Maison 7. The band has since played two Kitsuné events in La Maroquinerie, Paris, and Scala, London.

=== 2009–2010: WHB ===
Work on the band's first album was finished in Autumn 2009. It was mixed and co-produced by Gareth Jones who has also worked with Depeche Mode, These New Puritans and Emmy The Great. The recording and mix was finished in Strongrooms and the record was mastered by Nils at The Exchange. It was signed to Naïve Records, a French independent label at the end of 2009 and the album was released on 5 April 2010 on CD, vinyl and download formats. The album received much critical acclaim. The Times described it as "Brooding disco meets slick, new-wave indie". The Fly magazine said the album shows "just what a force they really are", whilst DIY wrote that the band "tipped their collective hat to Talking Heads and OMD to produce an album that married quirkiness with great tunes". The artwork was created by Sam Ashby, an East London art director and designer, who is also responsible for the queer film magazine Little Joe.

"Divisive" was the first single proper from the album. It was iTunes single of the week on its release week of 22 March. It received significant support from Radio 1 DJs Fearne Cotton and Jo Whiley. The video for "Divisive" was made by jul&mat for Solab who have also made videos for Metronomy. "Divisive" was remixed by Tom Starr and the Chicago house legend Carl Craig amongst others. "Divisive" was followed by a re-release of "Oh!". The re-release video was made by Blake Claridge. The final single from WHB was "Love What You Doing?". Released on 6 December 2010, the single was accompanied by remixes by Anoraak, Teenagers and Tokyo, and James Yuill.

From the 2008 London performances and early international festival performances, the band toured fairly constantly. At the Rencontres Trans Musicales in late 2008 in Rennes the band was described as "the revelation of the festival". In 2009 and 2010, the band played 287 shows in 26 countries. They played major festivals all over the UK including Glastonbury Festival, The Big Chill, V Festival, Lovebox Festival, Secret Garden Party, Latitude, Isle of Wight Festival, Parklife, and The Great Escape. Worldwide, they have played at SXSW, Melt! Festival, Berlin Festival, Emmaboda (Sweden), Paleo Festival (Switzerland), Pohoda (Slovakia), La Route du Rock, Exit (Serbia), Montreux Jazz Festival, Printemps de Bourges, Pukkelpop and Calvi on the Rocks among many others. Their energetic live shows earned them numerous plaudits.

=== 2011–2015: Ternion, Movements and dissolution ===
The band had several European dates and festivals throughout 2011, but mainly worked on the follow up to WHB with producer Luke Smith who had recently produced Foals, and the producer mixer Ben Hillier who has worked with Blur, Villagers and Elbow.

Ternion was released on 30 January 2012. The limited-edition version of the record included a bonus disc Ternion Aside, which is a 26-minute reworking of the album by Thomas Wegg-Prosser. The first single, "Where Are Your People?", was released on 5 February 2012, picking up television coverage on Sky's Soccer AM along with radio plays on stations such as XFM, Amazing Radio and fm4. There was significant interest on music blogs, including Clash Music, Disco Naivete and lagasta. This single was accompanied by remixes from the house act eatseverythingmusic and electronic duo Walls. The video for the release was made by Alex Turvey. The second single from Ternion, "Tired Of Running", was released on 4 June 2012. The video was shot in the woods of Marly Le Roi outside Paris and was directed by Arthur Castillon and Fabien Pochez. The single and video attracted coverage from La Gasta, Disco Naivete, Daze Digital, Electronic Beats and ilikemusic. At the end of the year, they released the "What's Mine, What's Yours" single, online only. To accompany the release was a montage style video edited and directed by Kate Bones. Along with this, Ternion Aside was re-released. Previously only available on the Special Edition of Ternion, it is a 26-minute re-work of Side A of "Ternion" by Tom Wegg-Prosser, who said, "It was inspired by The League Unlimited Orchestra’s ‘Love and Dancing’ Album. The idea of taking only the component parts from an original album recording and re-imagining them - creating a new and unique piece of music from what already existed whilst trying not to take a conventional remix approach. The 1st 5 tracks from ‘Ternion’ all worked within this concept and we love the way the music becomes something else." This was available to listen to on soundcloud and "What's Mine, What's Yours", the final track from the mix, was available to download for free.

On Recordstore Day, 21 April 2012, the band released a limited-edition double A-side of a cover of The Horrors' "Still Life" and Washed Out's "Within Without". To promote Ternion, the band performed the following live sessions: All Saints Basement Sessions, Daytrotter, Play NetWork, Nova Radio, le Mouv and The Clash.

The tour to accompany this album started on 15 February 2012 in Cargo London and was followed by an extensive tour of Europe, then on to South America for 16º Festival Cultura Inglesa with Franz Ferdinand and The Horrors. European and UK festivals followed, including Lovebox, Latitude, Montreux Jazz Festival, Berlin Festival and Dockville. A European autumn tour followed in September 2012, including Berlin Festival. In 2013, the band went to Mexico for some dates with Bandtastic and returned to do a German tour. In 2014, the band released their third and final album, Movements. The band played their final show on August 2, 2015, at Standon Calling festival in Standon, Hertfordshire.

=== Post-split activity ===
Thomas Wegg-Prosser ultimately left the music industry following the end of We Have Band, and later became a cognitive behavioral therapist with the BABCP. Through his work as a therapist, he has expressed "particular interest in working with people in the creative industries." Dede Wegg-Prosser has focused primiarly on raising her two children with Thomas, but has also done some modelling for UK clothing label Indoi. In 2019, Darren Bancroft launched a solo project under the moniker of Evadney and released its debut EP Sold Love, Sold. His debut solo album was projected for a 2025 release, and was originally to be titled Ku. The title was later changed to It's Dreaming, and was released on March 13, 2026.

== Instruments and style ==
The band wrote with guitars, bass guitars, synthesizers, soft synthesizers, percussion, drum machines and drum samples. Within a few months of working together they had the collection of songs that formed the backbone of their first album. Many of these songs appeared as single releases and on various compilations, including the Kitsuné Maison compilations. Their style has been variously described as disco revival and depressive disco. They have been lauded as "punk funk standard bearers" and in their early days were described by Paul Lester of The Guardian as being "unsigned and undeniable".

== TV and film ==
Several of the band's songs have been used in television advertisements. In 2010, the track "Honey Trap" was chosen for the global Diesel 'Be Stupid' campaign. In 2015, "Honey Trap" was also used by Coca-Cola in its 'Choose Coca-Cola' campaign. "Divisive" was used in the TV series Mercy and the Tom Starr remix was used on EA Games Need for Speed: Hot Pursuit. The band's third single, "Love What You Doing", was chosen for Stella McCartney's Print Collection Fragrances adverts. and twice in the TV show Made in Chelsea. The band also appeared on the Channel 4 Top Shop ctrl event broadcast in April 2010 and was featured on the MTV live sessions.

== Discography ==
=== Studio albums ===
Album title	Album details
WHB	Released: 5 April 2010; Label: Naïve Records; Formats: Vinyl, Download, CD
Ternion	Released: 30 January 2012; Label: Naïve Records; Formats: Vinyl, Download, CD
Movements	Released: 28 April 2014; Label: Naïve Records; Formats: Vinyl, Download, CD

=== Singles ===
Release details	Release date	Label
"Oh!"	November 2008	50 Bones
"You Came Out"	June 2009	Kill 'em All
"Divisive"	March 2010	Naïve Records
"Oh!"	June 2010	Naïve Records
"Love, What You Doing?"	December 2010	Naïve Records
"Where Are Your People?"	February 2012	Naïve Records
"Tired Of Running"	June 2012	Naïve Records
"What's Mine, What's Yours"	November 2012	Naïve Records

=== Remixing ===
- M83 - Reunion
- Gorillaz - On Melancholy Hill
- Peter Bjorn & John - It Don't Move Me
- Bloc Party - Halo
- Micachu - Lips
- James Yuill - This Sweet Love
- Monarchy - Gold in the Fire
- Natalia Kills - Wonderland,
- Wave Machine - Keep The Light On
- Anoraak - Try Me,
- Teenagers In Tokyo - Nightschool
- Filthy Dukes - Messages
- Brisa Roché - Sweat King

=== Cover versions ===
- "Let's Dance" (David Bowie) - We Were So Turned On: A Tribute To David Bowie
- "Still Life" (The Horrors) - Record Store Day
- "Within Without (Washed Out)" - Record Store Day
- "West End Girls" (Pet Shop Boys) for Uncovered Compilation

=== Mixtapes ===
- SoundCloud - We Have Band - Free Mixtape
- Spotify - We Have Band - Mixtape
- Digital Hunter - We Have Band - Mixtape
- Allez Allez - We Have Band - Mixtape
- Dummy Magazine Mixtape
