= Tom at Tut's =

Live album by Tom McRae
- Released: 2011
- Recorded: November 2004
- Genre: Rock
- Label: none

Tom McRae chronology
The Alphabet of Hurricanes (2007)	Tom at Tut's (2011)

Tom at Tut's is the third live album from British singer-songwriter Tom McRae. It was released in 2011 and includes songs and banter from two gigs on consecutive nights – 25 and 26 November 2004 – at King Tut's Wah Wah Hut in Glasgow where McRae performed with a full band. Recorded by Johnny Laing and mixed by Tom McRae. The band consisted of Tom McRae, Oliver Kraus, Olli Cunningham, Ash Soan and Steve Reynolds.

== Track listing ==
1. You Only Disappear
2. Karaoke Soul
3. back at Tut's
4. How the West was Won
5. if you need a moment
6. End of the World News (Dose Me Up)
7. that was pretty good
8. Hummingbird Song
9. São Paulo Rain
10. Border Song
11. A&B Song
12. Human remains
13. Silent Boulevard
14. Bloodless
15. My Vampire Heart
16. The Boy with the Bubblegun
17. run to the hills
18. Language of Fools
