= The Edge Festival =

Music festival in Edinburgh, Scotland

- The Edge Festival in 2009
- Dates: varies; normally August of each year
- Locations: various venues, Edinburgh, Scotland
- Years active: 2000–2012
- Founders: DF Concerts, Tennent's Lager
- Website: http://www.theedgefestival.com

The Edge Festival was an annual music festival held in Edinburgh, Scotland, during August of each year. Formerly known as T on the Fringe, The Edge was part of the Edinburgh Festival Fringe, the world's largest arts fringe festival (to the larger Edinburgh Festival). Unlike other music festivals, The Edge did not take place at one location, with performers instead playing numerous venues across the city during the month. The festival was founded under the T on the Fringe name by DF Concerts and Tennent's Lager, with DF continuing to promote the festival after the departure of Tennent's from 2008 until 2012.

The festival began in 2000, with fifteen concerts in its first year. It was founded by Dave Corbett, after realising the lack of contemporary music taking place at the Edinburgh Festival. Since 2000, T on the Fringe has played host to some of the most commercially successful artists as well as the best in alternative and emerging talent. Over the years the event has seen performances by the likes of Pixies, Muse, Morrissey, Nancy Sinatra, Franz Ferdinand and Arcade Fire. The 2007 festival featured three concerts taking place at the 25,000 capacity Meadowbank Stadium, a record for the festival at the time.

== History ==
=== 2004 festival ===
Date	Artist(s)	Venue
10 August	The 5.6.7.8's	Liquid Room
13 August	Zero 7	Corn Exchange
13 August	Dido; Aqualung	Usher Hall
15 August	Best of T Break	Liquid Room
15 August	John Power	The Venue
16 August	Laura Veirs	The Venue
19 August	Massive Attack	Corn Exchange
19 August	Ed Harcourt	Liquid Room
19 August	James Yorkston	The Venue
20 August	Mull Historical Society	Liquid Room
20 August	Josh Ritter; A Girl Called Eddy	The Venue

Date	Artist(s)	Venue
23 August	The Charlatans	Corn Exchange
23 August	Hope of the States	Liquid Room
23 August	Kinky	The Venue
24 August	The Zutons	Liquid Room
24 August	Sons and Daughters; The Fiery Furnaces	The Venue
25 August	2manydjs Black Rebel Motorcycle Club; Soulwax; LCD Soundsystem; Twitch	Corn Exchange
25 August	Kelis	Liquid Room
25 August	Yourcodenameis:milo	The Venue

Date	Artist(s)	Venue
26 August	Radio 4 The Futureheads	The Venue
27 August	Dashboard Confessional	Liquid Room
28 August	The Streets	Corn Exchange
28 August	Deus	Liquid Room
29 August	The Hives	Corn Exchange
29 August	Goldie Lookin' Chain	Liquid Room
30 August	Embrace	Liquid Room
30 August	TV on the Radio	The Venue
31 August	Morrissey	Corn Exchange
1 September	Jurassic 5	Corn Exchange
1 September	Edwyn Collins	The Venue

Embrace's performance at the Liquid Room was named "Best Gig of T on the Fringe 2004" by a judging panel consisting of the Sunday Mail, DF Concerts and Tennent's.

=== 2005 festival ===
The 2005 festival took place between 5–31 August, with more than forty acts performing across five venues. The festival's main highlight was a performance by Pixies on 28 August 2005, playing as part of their reunion tour following a 12-year hiatus. The band performed at the city's Meadowbank Stadium, the first outdoor performance for the T on the Fringe festival, with support from Idlewild and Teenage Fanclub. The festival's other main draw was two homecoming performances by Franz Ferdinand in Princes Street Gardens on 30–31 August 2005, supported by Arcade Fire. The dates were the band's first performances in the country since December the previous year. Other headline T on the Fringe shows included The Prodigy, Alabama 3, The Zutons, Weezer, Basement Jaxx and Razorlight. During August, Edinburgh's Cabaret Voltaire venue hosted a number of free concerts, featuring former Squeeze lead vocalist Glenn Tilbrook, Michael Franti, Saul Williams, Trashcan Sinatras and Rachel Fuller performing acoustic sets between the 15—26 August. Idlewild would also play acoustically at the venue, appearing on 27 August prior to supporting Pixies. Idlewild's concert was later steamed online for three months following the festival, under the moniker of "T on the Fringe Radio". The broadcast also included a feature on the Best of T Break.

The festival was deemed a success by critics, with Lynsey Hanley of The Observer stating that "..[the festival's line-up] encompassed the past, present and future of alternative rock".

=== 2006 festival ===
2006 saw 100,000 tickets sold for almost 60 gigs featuring 134 artists. Snow Patrol rocked the 22,000 Meadowbank Stadium crowd in what was their biggest headline gig yet, while at the same time breaking a record already held by T on the Fringe for the biggest show at the Edinburgh Fringe. Radiohead performed at the same venue supported by Beck and Muse played the following night supported by My Chemical Romance.

=== 2007 festival ===
The 2007 festival took place on 4—28 August across four venues, with more than 60 events taking place. The festival was marked by the announcement of three large outdoor concerts taking place at Meadowbank Stadium, which had increased in capacity to 25,000 for the event. Two of the headlining acts were announced as Foo Fighters and Kaiser Chiefs, with Razorlight later confirmed to play the stadium. The three concerts marked the biggest performances in the festival's history. Support acts for Foo Fighters and Razorlight were later confirmed as Nine Inch Nails and Silversun Pickups, and Editors, respectively. As well as this, independent record label Chemikal Underground announced a showcase at the Liquid Room featuring Mother and the Addicts, Aidan Moffat and De Rosa, in honor of the record label's 100th release. The festival's full line-up, announced on 7 June 2007, was as follows:

Date	Artist(s)	Venue
4 August	Tom Baxter; Stephen Dosen	Cabaret Voltaire
5 August	The Law; Luva Anna	Cabaret Voltaire
6 August	Isobel Campbell & Mark Lanegan	Liquid Rooms
8 August	Angus & Julia Stone	Cabaret Voltaire
9 August	The Magic Numbers	Liquid Rooms
9 August	Candie Payne	Cabaret Voltaire
10 August	Emma Pollock	Cabaret Voltaire
10 August	James; My Federation	Corn Exchange
11 August	Silverchair; Forever Like Red	Corn Exchange
12 August	Calvin Harris	Liquid Rooms
13 August	Duke Special; The Ghost Frequency	Liquid Rooms
13 August	Pete & the Pirates; The Dials	Cabaret Voltaire
14 August	Seasick Steve; Dave Arcari	Liquid Rooms
15 August	Amy Macdonald	Cabaret Voltaire
16 August	Kanye West	Corn Exchange

Date	Artist(s)	Venue
16 August	Kharma 45; Penny Blacks	Cabaret Voltaire
17 August	Paul Steel	Cabaret Voltaire
17 August	Stephen Fretwell; Evan Crichton	Liquid Rooms
18 August	Broken Records	Liquid Rooms
18 August	Union of Knives	Cabaret Voltaire
19 August	Crash My Model Car; The Orange Lights	Cabaret Voltaire
19 August	Jamie T	Liquid Rooms
20 August	Guillemots	The City Cafe
20 August	Guillemots	Liquid Rooms
20 August	Figure 5 Sergeant	Cabaret Voltaire
21 August	Foo Fighters; Nine Inch Nails; Silversun Pickups	Meadowbank Stadium
21 August	Willy Mason	Liquid Rooms
22 August	Mother and the Addicts; Aidan Moffat; De Rosa	Liquid Rooms
22 August	Interpol; The Maccabees	Corn Exchange

Date	Artist(s)	Venue
22 August	Scouting for Girls; The Hussy's	Cabaret Voltaire
23 August	Hot Club de Paris	Cabaret Voltaire
23 August	Kate Nash	Liquid Rooms
23 August	The Shins; Eugene McGuinness	Corn Exchange
24 August	Happy Mondays; Castaway	Corn Exchange
24 August	Kaiser Chiefs; The View; The Pigeon Detectives	Meadowbank Stadium
24 August	Soma Records showcase	Cabaret Voltaire
25 August	Turbonegro	Liquid Rooms
26 August	Razorlight; Editors; The Dykeenies	Meadowbank Stadium
26 August	The Sounds	Liquid Rooms
27 August	Dinosaur Jr.	Liquid Rooms
27 August	The Teenagers; Wild Beasts; Dan Deacon	Cabaret Voltaire
28 August	Jack Peñate	Cabaret Voltaire
28 August	Eagles of Death Metal	Liquid Rooms

Guillemots were originally scheduled to perform at the Corn Exchange, but chose instead to play two separate smaller performances, at the City Cafe and later in the Liquid Rooms. Greg Forbes of festival website eFestivals said that Editors' supporting concert at Meadowbank Stadium "blew them away", outperforming headliners Razorlight. In 2008, The Independent reported the 2007 event had sold 130,000 tickets, highlighting that the total number of events taking place had now quadrupled from the festival's inaugural year.

=== 2008 festival ===
In 2008, it was announced that T on the Fringe would be rebranded as The Edge Festival, following the end of DF Concerts' partnership with Tennent's.

=== 2009 festival ===
The 2009 event took place between 1–31 August, with more than fifty artists performing across seven venues. Organisers secured a number of high-profile revival acts, including David Byrne, Magazine and Faith No More, the band's first Scottish performance in over a decade. As well as this, performers included ex-Lightning Seeds frontman Ian Broudie, The Bluetones, Mumford & Sons, Biffy Clyro, Frightened Rabbit, Andrew Bird, Unicorn Kid and Young Fathers, The Streets, Amanda Palmer, múm, Broken Records and Calvin Harris. The List named Unicorn Kid and Young Fathers in their Top 20 Festival Shows list for 2009, the only appearance by an Edge Festival performance.

=== 2010 festival ===
The 2010 event took place between 5—31 August. It marked the return of the Cabaret Voltaire venue, which had suffered fire damage the previous year. The first acts were announced in June 2010, with Dizzee Rascal confirmed to play the Corn Exchange. Further acts announced included Mika, Professor Green, Tinchy Stryder, Eels, Modest Mouse, Beirut, The Coral, The Divine Comedy, Doves, Steve Mason and Colin MacIntyre, The Phantom Band, Pearl and the Puppets, We Were Promised Jetpacks, Kassidy, Broken Records, The Low Anthem, Little Feat, General Fiasco, Gomez, Tom Gray, Phoenix, Get Cape. Wear Cape. Fly, Stornoway and dan le sac vs Scroobius Pip. The festival featured a performance by Michael Rother, formerly of Neu!.
