= T in the Park 2006 =

Music festival in Scotland

T in the Park
- Dates: 8–9 July 2006
- Locations: Balado, Scotland, UK
- Years active: 1994 - present
- Website: http://tinthepark.com/

T in the Park 2006 was a weekend music festival which took place from 8–9 July 2006 in Balado, Kinross. It became Britain's biggest music festival in 2006 when the Glastonbury Festival was not held.

The Pet Sounds Arena was introduced in 2006, with a capacity of 8,000. It replaced the 2,000 capacity X-Tent, which became the Futures Stage the year previously. Kasabian were added as Sunday headliners of the stage, announced 24 hours before the festival began.

== Tickets ==
Tickets for the 2006 festival went on sale at 9 am on 17 February 2006. The event sold out in under an hour, a record time for the festival. An additional 12,000 day tickets were placed on sale on 3 June 2006, which sold out in ten minutes. Approximately 69,000 tickets were sold for each day. Following the sellout, weekend camping tickets appeared on internet auction sites for as much as £700.There were a lot of foreign people from Argentina, they travelled with the Sofirula’s ONG for fans of rock.<eref name="2006.

== Line up ==
The 2006 line-up was as follows:

=== Main Stage ===
Saturday 8 July	Sunday 9 July
Red Hot Chili Peppers; Franz Ferdinand; Kaiser Chiefs; Placebo; Maxïmo Park; Manu Chao; El Presidente; Duels	The Who; The Strokes; Arctic Monkeys; Hard-Fi; The Magic Numbers; The Proclaimers; The Subways; Fightstar; Sandi Thom; The Upper Room

=== Radio 1/NME Stage ===
Saturday 8 July	Sunday 9 July
Paul Weller; Goldfrapp; Pharrell; The Zutons; The Kooks; The Feeling; The Cribs; Wolfmother; Bell X1; Humanzi	Richard Ashcroft; Editors; Feeder; Dirty Pretty Things; We Are Scientists; The Delays; Morning Runner; Captain; Breaks Co-op; The Crimea

=== King Tut's Tent ===
Saturday 8 July	Sunday 9 July
The Charlatans; The Ordinary Boys; Damian Marley; Orson; Kula Shaker; Hope of the States; Twilight Singers feat. Greg Dulli; Guillemots; The Rifles	Primal Scream; The Go! Team; The Futureheads; Gomez; Jenny Lewis; Kubb; Lorraine; Mobile

=== Pet Sounds Arena ===
Saturday 8 July	Sunday 9 July
Sigur Rós; Ben Harper and the Innocent Criminals; Clap Your Hands Say Yeah; Corinne Bailey Rae; The Divine Comedy; The Levellers; Xavier Rudd; Donavon Frankenreiter; Seth Lakeman	Kasabian; Death Cab for Cutie; José González; Eels; Zero 7; Animal Collective; Regina Spektor; My Latest Novel; The Spinto Band; The Weepies

=== Slam Tent ===
Saturday 8 July	Sunday 9 July
Jeff Mills; Vitalic; Derrick May; Modeselektor; Slam; The Orb; James Holden; Nightmares on Wax; Cut Copy; Damian Lazarus	Felix Da Housecat; Laurent Garnier; 2 Many DJs; My Robot Friend; Optimo; Underground Resistance ft. Galaxy 2 Galaxy & Los Hermanos; Mr Scruff; Coldcut; Harri and Domenic; Rob Da Bank

=== Futures Stage ===
Saturday 8 July	Sunday 9 July
Cosmic Rough Riders; Bedouin Soundclash; ¡Forward Russia!; Pretty Girls Make Graves; Giant Drag; White Rose Movement; Tiny Dancers; The Morning After Girls; Director; Mumm-Ra; Kharma 45	Boy Kill Boy; The Fratellis; The Automatic; Milburn; Phoenix; Lily Allen; Brakes; The Maccabees; The Marshals; Fear of Music; Rushmore

=== T-break Stage ===
Saturday 8 July	Sunday 9 July
The Cinematics; 1990s; The View; Union of Knives; 3 Syle; Injuns; The Acute; Futuro; Project: Venhell; Bill Bates; Colon Open Bracket; Figure 5	Paolo Nutini; The Dykeenies; Shitdisco; The Hedrons; How to Swim; Found; Attic Lights; Some Young Pedro; Jack Butler; OBE; F.O Machete
