= Kissy Sell Out =

British-Canadian DJ (born 1984)

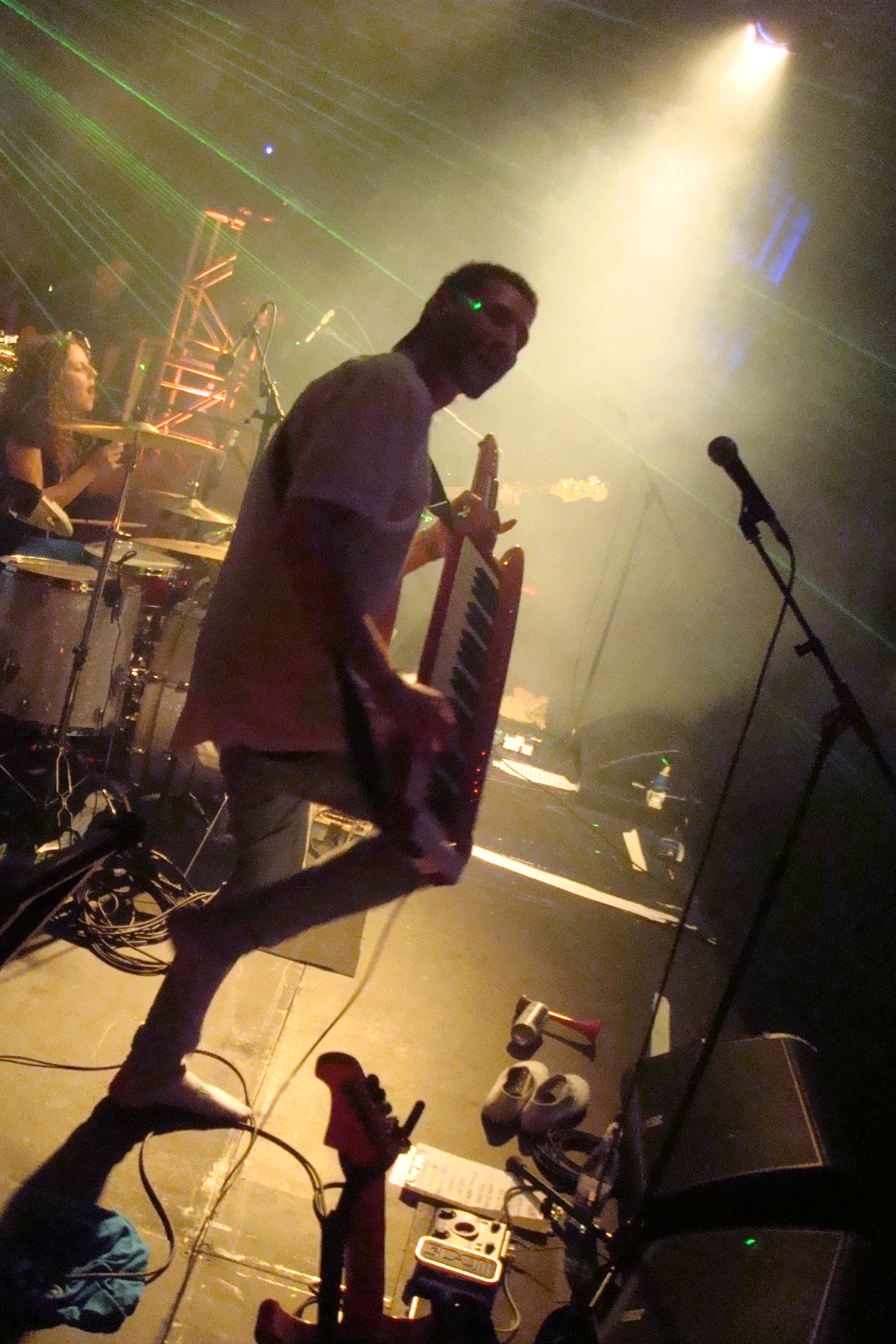
- Kissy live in Jersey

Background information
- Born: Thomas Benjamin Bisdee; 18 June 1984 (age 42); Huntingdon, Cambridgeshire, England
- Origin: Colchester, Essex, England
- Genres: Electronic, breakbeat, speed garage
- Occupations: DJ, producer, graphic designer
- Labels: Stepper Man; San City High; Carrillo Music; Cheap Thrills Records; Lavolta Records; Asylum Records; Ministry of Sound Australia
- Website: facebook.com/kissysellout

Kissy Sell Out (born Thomas Benjamin Bisdee; 18 June 1984 in Huntingdon, Cambridgeshire, England) is a British/Canadian DJ, producer, graphic designer, label manager of San City High Records and Stepper Man, and science columnist for Sick Chirpse. Kissy Sell Out gained notability in 2006 for his electro music productions and energetic DJ style. In 2009 Mixmag described him as "one of the most exciting, charismatic and entertaining DJs of the decade".

In addition to his DJ work, he has released six albums – Youth, Wild Romance, Introducing Kissy Sell Out, San City High All Stars Vol. 1 & 2, Style from the Westside – and composed official music for the 2012 Olympics ceremonies held in London.

== BBC Radio 1 ==
From 2007 to 2012 he hosted a successful BBC Radio 1 show called the Kissy Klub. The show blended classical music, and computer-voiced fictional characters with an exclusive selection of remixes created specifically for the show called "Kissy Klub Versions". Notable artists such as Diplo, Felix Da Housecat, Hervé, Uffie & Erol Alkan made regular appearances alongside exclusive tracks Kissy supported which kick-started careers for a long list of breakthrough producers and DJs across the globe.

Until 2009, the majority of his musical output as a producer was in remixes for other artists such as Mark Ronson, Calvin Harris, The Human League, Sugababes, Groove Armada and All Saints. It was this early production work that caught the attention of executives at BBC Radio 1.

In July 2007, Kissy Sell Out was signed by BBC Radio 1 to present a monthly instalment of a specialist dance music show called In New DJs We Trust. In October 2008 he permanently took over Eddie Halliwell's Thursday night slot to host his own weekly show called the Kissy Klub. His radio show covered a selection of musical styles and genres with the tracks often seamlessly mixed together. His last show with BBC Radio 1 was in 2012.

In 2019, a new podcast called "Long Live The Kissy Klub" was started to make the Kissy Klub DJ mixes and remixes available to fans of the original show, in high quality re-mastered audio format, for the first time since the show's end.

== Background ==
Kissy spent his teenage years growing up in Colchester, Essex. He began practising DJing and teaching himself music production at the age of 13 when a school friend played him a United Dance CD mixed by DJ Hype. His particular interest became very melodically complex post-modern electronic dance music, often around 128 BPM in tempo.

As Kissy's technical abilities blossomed professionally, his live DJ shows began to focus on putting electro beats over classical pieces of music using Pioneer's CDJ decks. This unique element in his approach to mixing led to producing and recording his second album "Wild Romance" almost entirely using classical instruments – something which began to attract media attention when he was invited to speak at a formal debate at the Cambridge Union against Stephen Fry about the relevance of classical music to the youth of today in May 2011. Kissy also appeared with Stephen Fry on the BBC's Look East news programme and BBC Radio 4's Today Show, and wrote a two-page article published in The Independent newspaper about the subject.

Kissy has been the subject of two questions on the game show The Chase, first in the UK and then on the New Zealand version. The question asked on both occasions was:

"Which of these Radio 1 DJs was born Thomas Bisdee? Kissy Sell Out, Kutski, or Mista Jam?"

When not working on his own music, much of his time as a music producer has been spent mentoring fresh names in dance music through his label San City High and also by judging DJ competitions such as the Red Bull Thre3style UK tour.

Kissy has often been described by the press as being a staple of the east London electro scene, and most of his records are produced at his studio in the Shoreditch/Brick Lane area.

Inspired by early recordings of underground drum'n'bass events in the UK, Kissy frequently used an air horn during his DJ sets and in June 2007 was pictured on the front cover of DJ Magazine blasting one into the air.

During his final year studying Graphic Design at Central Saint Martins College of Art and Design in London, Kissy worked full-time as a design assistant at a high-fashion magazine called POP Magazine.

== Pioneer DJ ==
Kissy has worked very closely with Pioneer DJ since 2011, consulting as a brand ambassador and beta tester – alongside James Zabeila and Laidback Luke – during the development of two respective iterations of the CDJ-2000 Nexus and DJM-900 Nexus equipment, and several versions of Pioneer DJ's rekordbox software. Kissy has made many YouTube video demonstration videos for the company, using the 2000 NXS and RMX-1000 products, and personally went to the Pioneer DJ Japan headquarters in Kawasaki to contribute to the blue print designs for the DJM-900 NXS II product line in 2015.

Kissy has appeared on four instalments of the YouTube series Pioneer DJ Sounds since 2011, with the viewing figures approaching a million views in some cases.

== KSO & Stepper Man ==
In 2017, Kissy began releasing music and booking shows as "KSO", in addition to starting a new label called Stepper Man.

After 12 years as a professional music producer, the KSO moniker signalled the start of a new chapter in Kissy's career. A KSO debut album, called "Style From The Westside" released in August 2018, featuring collaborations with DJ Q, Darkzy, Wideboys, Sam Supplier, Dread MC, JG, Tengu, Jaikea, Pavv, J69, Hyperactive MC, Beth Macari and The Melody Men. The album is specifically a bass house and bassline club record, with the second single "Dub For Ya Speaker" described by Mixmag as "masterfully combining bassline house with vintage hip-hop and early jungle", featuring the release as their "tune of the month" in the breaks section.

UKF published an interview feature with KSO about the album claiming the release to be "one of the realest bassline albums you'll hear all year", noting that the rapid creation of the album in nine months coincided with Kissy becoming a father.

== Health and fitness appearances ==
In November 2015, Kissy became an ambassador for Decibel Nutrition, alongside JP from Made in Chelsea, Amy Willerton and Rob Edmond. Since then, he has featured in several photo shoots as a fitness model, and appeared on BESTfitTV as a celebrity contender in their extreme fitness challenge.

In summer 2016, Bear Grylls took Kissy on, alongside Mission Survive winner Vogue Williams, to host the main stage at each of his Survival Race events across the UK. The hosts presented awards to the winners, interviewed inspiring figures in the armed forces and challenged the crowd with various fitness activities.

Kissy's run of appearances was cut short, just shy of the last race in London, due to a last minute opportunity to tour Romania for the first time with MC Cobra.

== Discography ==
=== Albums ===
- Youth (2009)
- Introducing Kissy Sell Out (2010 – North American only release)
- Wild Romance (2011)
- San City High All Stars (2013)
- San City High All Stars, Vol. 2 (Mixed by Kissy Sell Out) (2015)
- Style from the Westside (2018)

=== Singles ===
- "Always (Together Forever)" feat. Robert Owens (released 7 March 2016 on San City High Records / Carrillo Music)
- "Caught Up" feat. Jamie George (released 2 November 2015 on San City High Records / Lifted House / Carrillo Music)
- "Who Walks Alone" (released 2013 on San City High Records / Vicious Bitch Recordings)
- "Ready for the World" feat. Hervé & Elliot Chapman (released 2013 on San City High Records / Vicious Bitch Recordings)
- "Live Wire" feat. Rob Sparx and Jane Thomas (released 2013 on San City High Records / Vicious Bitch Recordings)
- "Early Morning Crew" feat. The Squatters (released 20 November 2012 on What's Your Status?)
- "Turn It On" feat. MC Cobra (released 2011 on San City High Records)
- "Homesick" feat. Oh Snap!! (released 2011 on San City High Records)
- "Wild in the Warehouse / Redrinkulous" (released 4 April 2011 on San City High Records)
- "Joanna" (released 16 August 2010 on San City High Records)
- "Garden Friends" (released 9 April 2010 on Ministry of Sound Australia)
- "Come on Over (This Could Be Love)" feat. Tinashé (released 8 March 2010 on Island Records/San City High Records)
- "This Kiss" (Released 1 June 2009 on San City High Records)
- "Rikkalicious" feat. Hervé (Released 20 October 2008 on Cheap Thrills Records)
- "Her" (Released 23 July 2007 on Lavolta Records)
- "Her / Permanent Record" (Released 9 May 2007 on San City High Records)

=== Compilations ===
- Mixmag Presents Kissy Sell Out's Blowout (mixed by Kissy Sell Out) (released 8 September 2013 on Mixmag)
- Kissy Sell Out's Xmas Blowout (mixed by Kissy Sell Out) (released 1 December 2009 on Mixmag)
- Mashed Four (mixed by Kissy Sell Out and The Aston Shuffle) (released 19 April 2008 on Ministry of Sound Australia)

=== Official remixes ===
Original Artist	Song	Remix Name	Label	Year
Gettoblaster feat. Servante	"Fingerbang"	Kissy Sell Out Remix	We Jack	2017
Run DMC	"Walk This Way"	Kissy Sell Out Remix	TBC	2015
Terri B!	"I'm Coming Back"	Kissy Sell Out Remix	Carrillo Music	2015
Lisa Williams	"Junk"	Kissy Sell Out Remix	Carrillo Music	2015
Nadia Gattas	"The Feeling"	Kissy Sell Out Remix	Carrillo Music	2015
Super Square	"Erase Me"	Kissy Sell Out Remix	Carrillo Music	2015
Eddie Amador	"Awake"	Kissy Sell Out Remix	Carrillo Music	2015
Hybrid Theory feat. Trilla	"That's What It Is"	Kissy Sell Out Remix	Four40 Records	2015
Binary Finary	"1998"	Kissy Sell Out's Trap Mix	Armada	2013
Ali Love	"Love Harder"	Kissy Sell Out Remix	Dim Mak	2013
Steve Aoki feat. Kid Cudi & Travis Barker	"Cudi the Kid"	Kissy Sell Outs Style from the Dark Side	Ultra Records	2012
TAI	"At the Disco"	Kissy Sell Out's Skippin' School	Dim Mak	2012
Spencer & Hill	"Dance"	Kissy Sell Out's 4x4 Moombahton Fix	Dim Mak	2012
Zeds Dead	"Rude Boy"	Kissy Sell Out & MC Cobra's VIP Mix	San City High	2011
Art vs. Science	"Magic Fountain"	Kissy Sell Out's Dark Crystal Version	Ministry of Sound (Australia)	2010
Noisettes	"Wild Young Hearts"	Kissy Sell Out Remix	Vertigo	2010
Frankmusik	"Better Off As Two"	Kissy Sell Out Says Relax	Island	2009
The Human League	"The Things That Dreams Are Made Of"	Kissy Sell Out Mix	Hooj Choons	2009
Shiny Toy Guns	"Ricochet!"	Kissy Sell Out Mix	Ultra Records	2009
Noisettes	"Don't Upset the Rhythm"	Kissy Sell Out in the Black Lodge	Mercury Records	2009
Calvin Harris	"Merrymaking at My Place"	Kissy Sell Out Remix	Fly Eye	2007
Groove Armada	"Song 4 Mutya"	Kissy Sell Out Remix	Columbia	2007
Sugababes	"About You Now"	Kissy Sell Out Remix	Island	2007
Remi Nicole	"Fed Up"	Kissy Sell Out's Rules of Attraction	Island	2007
The Black Ghosts	"Face"	Kissy Sell Out Remix	Southern Fried	2007
Operator Please	"Just a Song About Ping Pong"	Kissy Sell Out's White Stallion	Brille	2007
The Dykeenies	"New Ideas"	Kissy Sell Out's Crude Oasis	Lavolta	2007
Chungking	"Love Is Here to Stay"	Kissy Sell Out's Own Private Idaho	Institute	2007
Acoustic Ladyland	"Cuts & Lies"	Kissy Sell Out Mix	V2	2007
Mark Ronson	"Stop Me"	Kissy Sell Out's True Romance	Columbia	2007
Gwen Stefani	"Wind It Up"	Kissy Sell Out Remix	Interscope	2006
All Saints	"Chick Fit"	Kissy Sell Out's Excellent Adventure / Bogus Journey	Parlophone	2006
GoodBooks	"Leni"	Kissy Sell Out Mix	Columbia	2006
Neat People	"Baby I'm Bored"	Kissy Sell Out Remix	Rekabet	2006

=== Remix EPs ===
Title	Details	Tracklist
Live Wire (Remixes)	Released: 2012; Label: Kissy Sell Out LTD; Formats: Digital download	Live Wire ft. Rob Sparx & Jane Thomas (Sui Generis Remix); Live Wire ft. Rob Sparx & Jane Thomas (Sparx V.I.P Remix); Live Wire ft. Rob Sparx & Jane Thomas (GOLD Remix); Live Wire ft. Rob Sparx & Jane Thomas (The Sneekers Re-step Remix); Live Wire ft. Rob Sparx & Jane Thomas (Stereothieves Remix)
Who Walks Alone (Remixes)	Released: 2013; Label: Vicious; Formats: Digital download	Who Walks Alone (Toyboy & Robin Remix); Who Walks Alone (Suckfake & Daniel Brooks Remix); Who Walks Alone (Disposition Remix); Who Walks Alone (J A S P E R Remix); Who Walks Alone (Indian Summer Remix); Who Walks Alone ft. Holly Lois (Vocal Mix)

== Kissy Klub Versions ==
Kissy Klub Versions were unofficial remixes of songs by artists which are played exclusively on Kissy Sell Out's BBC Radio 1 Show. The idea to remix songs for a radio show is down to the BBC's rules on conflict of interest which restrict the amount of air time producers such as Kissy can fill with their own material. Since Kissy's own re-edits of tracks have been a widely talked about feature of his DJ sets since 2006, Kissy felt it was important to continue this feature in his radio show and thus the Kissy Klub Version concept was started.

During the show's life-span, very few other DJs ever obtained copies of the near 1000 long list of exclusive remixes. Efforts were made to release a BBC Kissy Klub Versions CD but failed due to the incredibly complex licensing paperwork it would have involved to clear permissions for a large amount of highly established artists who were unfamiliar with the unusual concept.

As of 2019, the Long Live The Kissy Klub podcast began publishing some of these exclusive remixes for the first time for fans to stream on iTunes and Spotify.

== Charity work ==
In January 2008, Kissy released a four-track EP of bootleg tracks on limited edition CD and digital downloads so he could donate all proceeds to the British Association for Adoption and Fostering The EP contains a blog-house track called "Get Busy Tropicana" as well as "You're on Fire" which was championed by Zane Lowe on BBC Radio .

Kissy also began supporting the Changing Faces charity in 2010 after meeting a severely facially disfigured young girl in a British airport whilst on his way to DJ in Ibiza. In an interview with Thomas H. Green published in Mixmag he talked of how the brief but poignant moment reduced him to tears and made him realise how lucky he was to be a successful DJ.

== Support for unsigned artists ==
Since Kissy himself claims to owe a lot of his early success to the support he received from DJs such as Simian Mobile Disco, Headman, DJ Touché, The Loose Cannons, Eddy Temple Morris and Tommie Sunshine, Kissy has insisted on championing unsigned artists and new independent producers as much as he can on his radio shows, festival appearances and press interviews.

Some of the faces in music Kissy has shown support for include Ronnie Flex, Foamo, Jo Kira, Metal on Metal, Proxy, 16 Bit, Jack Beats, Last Japan, Norrit, AutoErotique, Cold Blank, Bear Cavalry, Kamikaze Cream Cake, Late of the Pier, MC Cobra, Linda's Nephew, Chew Fu and the Palms Out Sounds blog, Haydn Haydn, Cap'nHarry, Figure, Danny Westcott, Frankmusik, Thoko, Mr. Vega, Matt Sayers, Dynasty, Bro Safari, ETC!ETC!, Hoi!, Black Peter Group, Futuristic Retro Champions, and Andy George and Jaymo who were signed to BBC Radio 1 after Kissy picked them to support him on a BBC Introducing edition of Radio 1's Essential Mix.

Kissy is curator of a music festival in the French Alps called Tignesfest.

== Awards ==
- IDJ Player of the Year 2007
