= New Ideas =

New Ideas may refer to:

- New Ideas (song), a 2006 song by The Dykeenies
- New Ideas (album), a 1961 album by Don Ellis
- Nuevas Ideas (English: New Ideas), a Salvadoran political party
