= Union of Knives =

Scottish electronic rock band

- Origin: Glasgow, Scotland
- Genres: Electronic rock; experimental rock; trip hop; ambient
- Years active: 2004–2009, 2020-present
- Labels: Relentless Records; Stimulus
- Members: Chris Gordon; Anthony Thomaz; Peter Kelly; Helen Marnie
- Past members: Dave McClean; Craig Grant
- Website: https://www.unionofknives.com/

Union of Knives are a Scottish electronic rock band from Glasgow, a trio consisting of producer and musician Chris Gordon (also known for the band Baby Chaos), programmer Dave McClean and singer Craig Grant.

Described by Time Out magazine as "glacial, epic pop melodies with dark electro detail," the music of Union of Knives blends electronic and rock forms and draws on influences from Massive Attack and Radiohead,

From live shows in dance clubs and rock venues from Iceland to Japan, their music has taken them to the halls of the Tate Modern and studios in LA. Their songs have had both Radio 1 airplay and use in TV soundtracks for the likes of Grey's Anatomy, The Vampire Diaries and Supernatural (American TV series).

Originally active between 2004 and 2009, the band have been on hiatus since but have announced new music is due in 2020..

== Formation ==
Chris Gordon and Dave McLean met in the Glasgow bar Nice 'n' Sleazy where Dave was working as a soundman in the venue downstairs and Chris was working at the bar in between producing and touring with other bands. Chris and Dave started working together as producers and engineers on recordings and remixes for the likes of Snow Patrol out of their own studio in Glasgow.

After a while of working together on original material, they met Craig Grant one night at the bar. Craig, originally from Aberdeen, had recently moved to Glasgow and was playing an acoustic night when Dave was doing sound. Chris and Dave invited him to work with them on some tracks they had started, and the success of those sessions become the early incarnation of Union of Knives in 2004.

The original line-up as a trio saw Chris and Craig both sharing lead vocals and guitar duties, with Dave McClean on keyboards.

== Early releases ==
The first release was a self-titled EP on Stimulus Records in 2005. Soon after the band secured a deal with Relentless Records and released the I Decline EP in April 2006 which picked up favourable reviews in the music press and saw Music Week adding it to their playlist and the NME calling it "Marvellous". DMC described the lead track as "a dance rock hybrid of gigantic proportions."

Shortly afterwards Clash Magazine featured the track "Operated On" in their 'Ones to Watch' CD compilation, describing the band's sound as "melodic dark pop" and likening their music to Radiohead and Fischerspooner.

== Debut album: Violence & Birdsong ==
The album Violence & Birdsong was released on Relentless Records in July 2006, and was described by The Guardian as "dance-rock...a nocturnal rendezvous between Muse and Massive Attack."

Singles from the album picked up regular airplay on XFM, 6Music and BBC Radio One, where they were especially championed by Zane Lowe.

The majority of the album was performed by Chris Gordon, Dave McClean and Craig Grant, with additional drums contributed by Peter Kelly, guitar by Paul Westwater and vocals by guests including Orlaith Prenderghast, a local singer who appears on "Opposite Direction".

Production credits for the album were split between the band and Steve Osborne, known for his work with Suede and remixes with Perfecto. The artwork for the cover of the album featured a mural of three doves painted by Brian Miller on a house in Cumbernauld.

Reviews from the Guardian and The Sunday Times likened the album's sound favourably to contemporaries like Sigur Rós, Massive Attack and Radiohead. Time Out described it as "glacial, epic pop melodies with dark electro detail"

== TV and film airplay, Tate Modern collaboration ==
Starting in 2005 the band had a string of success with tracks being used in TV soundtracks, such as Supernatural. The track "Opposite Direction" was used in the soundtrack for American TV shows The Vampire Diaries and Grey's Anatomy.

Their music also featured as the soundtrack for a short film by award-winning filmmaker Joseph Briffa named The Cut-Up Suite, released in 2006. As well as film soundtracks the band were invited by the Tate Modern to create a new track in response to an artwork. The resulting track 'Circular Breathing' would be played on listening posts in the gallery to accompany the painting "The Four Seasons" by Cy Twombly. The 'Tate Tracks' project won a D&AD advertising award in 2007.

== Touring and festival appearances ==
Early on in their career Union of Knives were invited to play at the Iceland Airwaves festival in Reykjavik Art Museum in 2005. Extensive UK touring supporting the release of the debut album in 2006 culminated in playing the Hogmanay Party at the O2 ABC Glasgow venue.

Festival appearances including playing T in the Park Festival in both 2006 (on the T Break stage) and 2007 (in the King Tut's stage) as well as the Isle of Skye Music Festival and The Edge Festival in 2007.

In Spring 2007 another UK tour was followed by a string of dates in Europe and an XFM showcase gig at the Metro Club in London.

In April 2008 the band played Tokyo, Japan, in a club date at Unit.

== Second album and hiatus ==
A follow-up album called 'The Anti-Fire' was written and recording had started in LA with Nine Inch Nails producer Atticus Ross in 2008, but then encountered delays due to upheaval in the label at the time. The album was put on hold during a period of uncertainty and cost-cutting for the label. After their record label was sold in 2009 the band parted ways with the label and eventually ceased activity. Chris Gordon and Craig Grant continued to work together in Song of Return, but while Chris was involved in the writing he decided to take a back seat from playing live, preferring to focus on his career as a producer for acts including Mónica Naranjo.

== Reactivation ==
In July 2020 Union of Knives announced via their social media channels that they would be reactivating, with a new line up of Chris Gordon, Anthony Thomaz and Peter Kelly returning on drums. The website was updated to mention new music coming soon, with Helen Marnie of Ladytron guesting on vocals for 2 tracks.

== Discography ==
=== Studio albums ===
- Violence & Birdsong (Relentless Records, 2006)
- Endless From The Start (Disco Piñata, 2021)

=== Singles and EPs ===
- Union of Knives EP (Stimulus Records, 2005)
- I Decline EP (Relentless Records, 2006)
- Taste For Harmony (Relentless Records, 2006)
- Operated On EP (Relentless Records, 2006)
- Evil Has Never (Relentless Records, 2007)
