= Tom McRae (album) =

Studio album by Tom McRae
- Released: 2 October 2000
- Genre: Rock
- Length: 45:09
- Label: db Records
- Producer: Chris Hughes

Tom McRae chronology
Tom McRae (2000)	Just Like Blood (2003)

Professional ratings
Review scores
Source	Rating
Allmusic	link
Pitchfork Media	8.1/10 link
Rolling Stone	link

Tom McRae is the debut album from British singer-songwriter Tom McRae. The album was released in 2000 and was nominated for the 2001 Mercury Music Prize.

== Track listing ==
All tracks by Tom McRae

1. "You Cut Her Hair" – 2:46
2. "End of the World News (Dose Me Up)" – 3:48
3. "2nd Law" – 2:50
4. "Bloodless" – 3:38
5. "Draw Down the Stars" – 2:14
6. "One More Mile" – 4:16
7. "Boy With the Bubblegun" – 3:01
8. "Hidden Camera Show" – 4:17
9. "A & B Song" – 4:15
10. "Language of Fools" – 3:57
11. "Untitled" – 3:51
12. "Sao Paulo Rain" – 4:51
13. "I Ain't Scared of Lightning" – 1:25

== Personnel ==
- Tom McRae – vocals, electric guitar (1,12), fx (1,4), string arrangement (1,7), guitar (2,4,6,7,8,10,13), percussion (2,6,9,10), piano (3,10), harmonium (4), acoustic guitar (5,9,12), 12 string (7), harmonica (9), keyboards (13)
- Jo Archard – strings (4)
- Sarah Button – strings (4)
- Anthony Clarke – string arrangement (2,10), piano (8,12)
- Mark Frith – electric guitar (2,6,9), piano (2,10), keyboards (2), bass (2,6,9), hammond (9,10)
- Fiona Griffith – strings (4)
- Tom Havelock – cello (1,7,8)
- Chris Hughes – percussion (2,9,10), drums (9)
- Clive Jenner – drums (2,8,10,12), percussion (8)
- Howard Jones – piano (11)
- Tony Marrison – programming (1,2,3,6,9), piano (1,5), string arrangement (1,7), hammond (3), keyboards (5,12), percussion (5,8), guitar (6), bass (8,12)
- Helen Thomas – strings (4)
