= Baby Chaos =

Scottish rock band

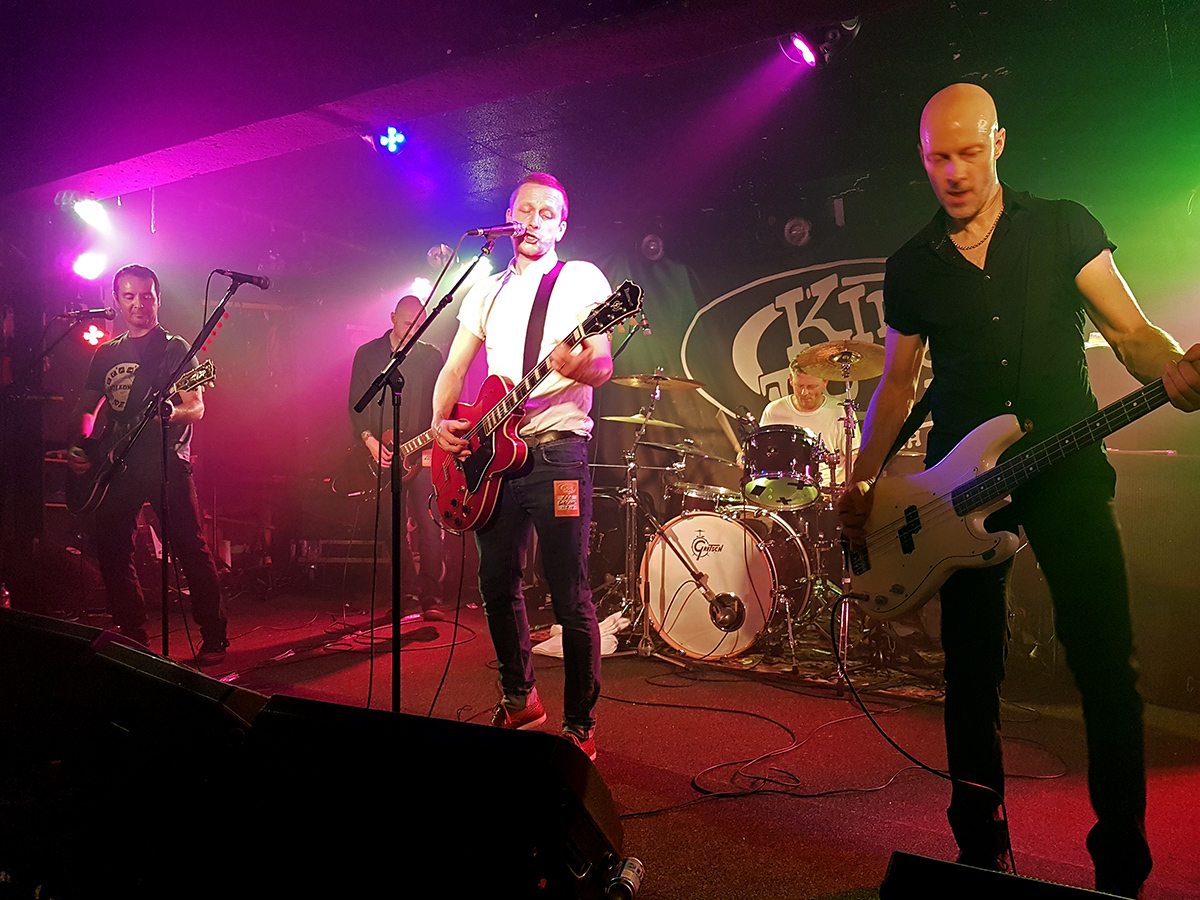
- Baby Chaos playing live at King Tut's in 2017

Background information
- Also known as: Deckard (1998–2004)
- Origin: Stewarton, Ayrshire, Scotland
- Genres: Rock
- Years active: 1993–1998, 2013–present
- Labels: Electric Honey, East West, Atlantic, Elektra, Reprise, Three Hands
- Spinoffs: Union of Knives
- Members: Chris Gordon; Bobby Dunn; Grant McFarlane; Davy Greenwood; Alan Easton
- Past members: Gen Matthews
- Website: Babychaos.com

Baby Chaos are a Scottish rock band based in Glasgow, Scotland, who originally formed in Ayrshire in 1993, then returned in 2015 after a long hiatus. The band consists of Chris Gordon on lead vocals and guitar, Grant McFarlane on guitar and backing vocals, Alan Easton on guitar, Bobby Dunn on bass and Davy Greenwood on drums.

== Formation ==
Baby Chaos formed in 1993 when the band members met at school, in Stewarton, Ayrshire. They relocated to Glasgow and in May 1993 released their first EP, Buzz, on the Electric Honey label. After appearing on TV in a feature on Scottish bands on The Late Show on BBC2 the band were signed to East West Records by Nathan McCough in August 1993. A first single "Sperm" was released by East West before the end of the year and Kerrang! featured the band as one of their "Klass of '94" feature, comparing them to Therapy? and the Smashing Pumpkins.

== 1990s success ==
Their debut album Safe Sex Designer Drugs & the Death of Rock 'N' Roll was released in the UK on 7 November 1994 and in the US in June 1995, after US radio stations such as KROQ took an interest. They toured across the UK and Europe with the likes of Terrorvision and The Wildhearts in 1994 and also the US where they did a tour supporting Elastica in 1995. Kerrang! gave the band 5/5 in their live reviews for the Camden Monarch and Highbury Garage shows.

A second album was recorded in 1995 with Al Scott and Zmago Smon. Love Your Self Abuse was released on 29 April 1996 and earned them a 5K review in Kerrang! magazine who have since cited it as one of Kerrang! readers' 100 best British rock albums. The album was released in the UK on East West and then a year later in the US and Japan on Atlantic Records with a slightly different track listing. The album featured the singles "Hello" and "Ignoramus", which was made Kerrang! 's Single of the Week. Changes at East West led to them being transferred to Atlantic Records for a short time, before their contact there expired and they found themselves without a label in 1998.

== Deckard ==
In 1998, after parting ways with their label the band also underwent a line up change as drummer Gen Matthews (previously of Jesus Jones) joined in place of Davy. The group decided to change name to Deckard and start afresh with a new record deal with Reprise Records in the US. They recorded a new album Stereodreamscene with Nick Launay at Ocean Way Studios in LA which was released in the US in July 2000. A review of the album on Five Miles High website described it as having "choruses with hooks so big you could use them to catch whales." Unfortunately changes at the label again led to a change of strategy and the band and label parted ways soon after without much promotion of the album. Deckard took a break until 2002 when they started work on a second album, Dreams Of Dynamite And Divinity, which was self-recorded and self-released in 2003. The band later issued an extended play, Holy Rolling Extended Player, on 18 October 2004. The EP features a duet between Gordon and Tobey Torres of Snake River Conspiracy on the bonus track "The Truth Will Do", as well as two live tracks recorded at a sell-out show at King Tut's Wah Wah Hut in Glasgow.

== Regency Buck and Union of Knives ==
After Deckard parted way with their label, Gordon went on to make music with Dave McLean and Paul Westwater as Regency Buck, recording an album in 2001 with Mark "Spike" Stent for DreamWorks. This was a short-lived project but did pave the way for forming Union of Knives in 2004, again with Dave McClean and with Craig Grant sharing lead vocals. Union of Knives put out the album Violence & Birdsong on Relentless Records in 2006, which was described by The Guardian as "dance-rock...a nocturnal rendezvous between Muse and Massive Attack." The album included the track "Opposite Direction" which received both BBC Radio 1 airplay and was used on the American TV shows The Vampire Diaries and Grey's Anatomy. Another track "Operated On" appeared on the soundtrack to Supernatural. After their record label was sold in 2009 Union of Knives parted ways with the label and eventually ceased activity. Chris Gordon and Craig Grant continued to work together in Song of Return, for which Chris Gordon was involved in the writing but decided to take a break from playing live, preferring to concentrate on producing for other acts.

== Reunion and new material ==
In 2010, former label mate Ginger Wildheart persuaded Baby Chaos to reform for a one off live date to support him in Glasgow. Following the gig the band felt inspired to work together again, but didn't want to just play their old material so they began to write a new album. In 2014 Baby Chaos returned for some further live dates, encouraged by Ginger who stood in on guitar for Grant at Halloween when he couldn't make the show, and also guested on guitar when they supported him again in Glasgow. 2015 saw the first release of new material with the original line-up, both self-produced and self-released. The single "You Can't Shut Us Up" was accompanied by a handful of live dates in Spring 2015. The album Skulls, Skulls, Skulls, Show Me The Glory was released in April to positive reviews from the rock press, who praised both the strength of the song writing and the production.

In September 2015, the band toured the UK supporting The Wildhearts playing venues such as Nottingham Rock City, Glasgow ABC and Shepherd's Bush Empire. In April 2016 they played three dates in France, touring Paris, Epinal and Strasbourg with Dead Pop Club and Napoleon Solo.

On 1 January 2016, a download-only companion album to Skulls, Skulls, Skulls, Show Me The Glory was released. Entitled Stripped Skulls it featured new recordings of stripped back versions of the album tracks, giving a different take on the songs.

In February 2017, the band played both a headline show at Huddersfield Parish and an extended support slot with Eureka Machines and Chris Catalyst's solo band at the Brudenell Social Club in Leeds. They also confirmed that they had started work on writing and recording a fourth album.

The band's fourth album, Ape Confronts Cosmos, was released on 6 March 2020. The album saw the addition of a fifth member, guitarist Alan Easton, who had previously deputised for McFarlane for a few live shows.

== Discography ==
=== As Baby Chaos ===
==== Singles and EPs ====
Title track	Other tracks	Release
"Buzz"	"Coming Clean", "Ether"	EP, May 1993, Electric Honey Records EHRCD01
"Sperm"	"Superpowered", "Tongue"	1993, East West
"Golden Tooth"	"Resurrected", "No Way", "The Earth is Dying", "But Nevermind"	EP, 1994, East West
"Hello Victim"	"Rotten To The Core", "Skinny"	1994, East West
"Buzz"	"Superpowered"	1994, East West
"Hello"	"Negatively Yours", "Consider Yourself"	1996, East West
"Ignoramus"	"Fetch", "I Don't Want To Be Your Friend"	1996, East West
"Blackbirds"		2015, self-released

==== Albums ====
- Safe Sex Designer Drugs & the Death of Rock 'N' Roll (October 1994, East West)
- Love Your Self Abuse (April 1996, East West)
- Live at The Hultsfred Festival (recorded 1996, released 2008 via website download only)
- Skulls, Skulls, Skulls, Show Me the Glory (2015, Three Hands Records)
- Stripped Skulls (2016, website only download album)
- Ape Confronts Cosmos (2020, Three Hands Records)
- This Is the Moment – Live 2015-2019 (2021)

=== As Deckard ===
==== Singles and EPs ====
- "The Deckard" EP (1999, Reprise Records)
- "Holy Rolling" EP (2004, self-released)

==== Albums ====
- Stereodreamscene (2000, Reprise Records)
- Dreams of Dynamite and Divinity (2003, self-released)
- Live at King Tut's (recorded 2004, released 2009 via website download only)
