= All Maps Welcome =

Studio album by Tom McRae
- Released: 5 May 2005 (UK); 31 May 2005 (US)
- Genre: Folk
- Length: 48:28
- Label: Sony/BMG Records
- Producer: Joe Chiccarelli

Tom McRae chronology
Just Like Blood (2003)	All Maps Welcome (2005)	King of Cards (2007)

Professional ratings
Review scores
Source	Rating
Allmusic	3.5/5 stars

All Maps Welcome is the third studio album from British singer-songwriter Tom McRae.

== Track listing ==
All tracks written by Tom McRae.

1. "For the Restless" – 4:06
2. "Hummingbird Song" – 4:45
3. "The Girl Who Falls Downstairs" – 5:03
4. "How the West Was Won" – 6:16
5. "Packing for the Crash" – 3:49
6. "It Ain't You" – 4:07
7. "Strangest Land" – 3:27
8. "My Vampire Heart" – 3:13
9. "Silent Boulevard" – 5:04
10. "Still Lost" – 3:48
11. "Border Song" – 4:50
