= Just Like Blood =

Studio album by Tom McRae
- Released: 3 February 2003 (UK); 18 February 2003 (US)
- Genre: Rock
- Length: 41:22
- Label: db Records
- Producer: Ben Hillier

Tom McRae chronology
Tom McRae (2000)	Just Like Blood (2003)	All Maps Welcome (2005)

Professional ratings
Review scores
Source	Rating
Allmusic	link

Just Like Blood is the second studio album by British singer-songwriter Tom McRae, released on February 3, 2003, in the United Kingdom.

== Track listing ==
1. "A Day Like Today"
2. "You Only Disappear"
3. "Ghost of a Shark"
4. "Stronger Than Dirt"
5. "Overthrown"
6. "Walking 2 Hawaii"
7. "Mermaid Blues"
8. "Karaoke Soul"
9. "Line of Fire"
10. "Human Remains"
11. "Street Light" (US Bonus Tracks)
12. "Walking 2 Hawaii (live/KCRW session" (US Bonus Tracks)

The album was produced by Ben Hillier, known for his work with artists such as Elbow and Blur. Recording sessions took place at The Dairy, Tom's House, and Fortress studios. The production features a blend of acoustic and electronic elements, complementing McRae's introspective lyrics.

== Personnel ==
- Tom McRae – vocals (1–10), guitars (1–10), keyboards (1), programming (1), organ (3), percussion (3, 4), ARP synthesizers (7), string arrangement (8)
- Oli Kraus – cello (1–5, 7, 9, 10), piano (2, 5, 7), percussion (4), cello madness (6), ARP synthesizers (7), string arrangements (8), strings (8)
- John Hogg – bass (1–4, 7, 9), banjo (4), percussion (4), guitar (7), ARP synthesizers (7), piano (9)
- Ben Hillier – percussion (1, 2, 4, 10), drums (2, 4, 9), organ (2, 7), sitar (4), ARP synthesizers (7), Memory Man effects pedal (7), banjo (8)
- Paul Noonan – drums (3)
- Clive Jenner – drums (5, 10), percussion (10)
- Tony Marrison – bass (5, 10), piano (8), rhodes keyboard (10)
- Becky Doe – violin (5)
- Clive Deamer – drums (6, 8)
- Charlie Jones – bass (6, 8)
- Hossam Ramzy – percussion (8), additional strings (8)
- Lucy Wilkins – strings (8)
- Howard Gott – strings (8)
- Ruth Gotlieb – strings (8)
- Natalia Bonner – strings (8)
