= Nothing Means Everything =

Studio album by The Dykeenies
- Released: 17 September 2007
- Genre: Indie rock
- Length: 35:21
- Label: Lavolta

Singles from Nothing Means Everything
- 1. "New Ideas" Released: 9 April 2007; 2. "Clean Up Your Eyes" Released: 9 July 2007; 3. "Stitches" Released: 10 September 2007

Nothing Means Everything is the debut album from Scottish band The Dykeenies. It was released on the Lavolta Records label on 17 September 2007.

== Track listing ==
No.	Title	Length
1.	"The Panic"	2:47
2.	"Waiting For Go"	2:30
3.	"Stitches"	3:44
4.	"Clean Up Your Eyes"	3:51
5.	"Pick You Up"	3:10
6.	"New Ideas"	3:14
7.	"In & Out"	3:12
8.	"Things You Cannot See"	2:59
9.	"Symptoms"	3:09
10.	"Lose Ourselves"	3:12
11.	"Feels Like Sleep"	3:40
