= New Ideas (song) =

Single by The Dykeenies

from the album Nothing Means Everything
- Released: 17 July 2006
- Genre: New wave, indie rock
- Length: 3:21
- Label: King Tut's Recordings
- Songwriter(s): The Dykeenies
- Producer(s): Dimitri Tikovoi

The Dykeenies singles chronology
"New Ideas" (2006)	"New Ideas" (2007)

The Dykeenies singles chronology
"New Ideas"/"Will It Happen Tonight?" (2006)	"New Ideas" (2007)	"Clean Up Your Eyes" (2007)

"New Ideas"/"Will It Happen Tonight?"
- Original release

"New Ideas" is the debut single by Scottish new wave/indie rock act The Dykeenies. It was first released as a Double A-side with "Will It Happen Tonight?" on 17 July 2006. The band also recorded a video for the track. The song was released on King Tut's Recordings, a minor label created through Glaswegian venue King Tut's Wah Wah Hut in order to expose small unknown artists to more major record labels. The concept worked, and following the release of the single, the band were signed to Lavolta Records.

The track was re-recorded and then re-released on 9 April 2007. A new video for the track was also made. The track was released on CD with new acoustic track "Safe", a remix of "New Ideas" by dance act Kissy Sell Out (another signing of Lavolta) titled "New Ideas [Kissy Sell Out Crude Oasis]" and the video to their previous release, "Waiting For Go". Two 7-inch singles were released, containing B-sides "Layers" and "Simplify", alongside various other remixes. The re-released version peaked at number 54 on the UK Singles Chart for one week and number two in the band's native Scotland. Their next single, "Clean Up Your Eyes", would top the Scottish Singles Chart.

== Track listing ==
=== Original release ===
CD

1. "New Ideas" – 3:21
2. "Will It Happen Tonight?" - 3:22

=== Re-release ===
CD (LAVOLTA012)

1. "New Ideas" – 2:36
2. "Safe" - 2:26
3. "New Ideas [Kissy Sell Out Crude Oasis]"
4. "Waiting For Go" (Video) - 2:31

7" Special Edition Picture Disc (LAVOLTA012X)

1. "New Ideas" – 2:36
2. "Simplify" - 4:20

7" Gatefold

1. "New Ideas" - 2:36
2. "Layers"

== Charts ==
Chart (2007)	Peak position
Scotland (OCC)	2
UK Singles (OCC)	54
