= King of Cards =

Studio album by Tom McRae
- Released: 30 April 2007
- Genre: Rock
- Label: V2

Tom McRae chronology
All Maps Welcome (2005)	King of Cards (2007)	The Alphabet of Hurricanes (2010)

Professional ratings
Review scores
Source	Rating
musicOMH.com	3/5 stars
Q	4/5 stars
This Is Fake DIY	3/5 stars
Uncut	2/5 stars

King of Cards is the fourth studio album from British singer-songwriter Tom McRae, released on 14 May 2007. On 16 February 2007, all the tracks on King of Cards were made available for streaming on McRae's official website.

== Track listing ==
1. "Set the Story Straight"
2. "Bright Lights"
3. "Got a Suitcase, Got Regrets"
4. "Keep Your Picture Clear"
5. "Houdini and the Girl"
6. "Sound of the City"
7. "On and On"
8. "Deliver Me"
9. "One Mississippi"
10. "The Ballad of Amelia Earhart"
11. "Lord, How Long?"
