= Song of Return =

Scottish indie rock band

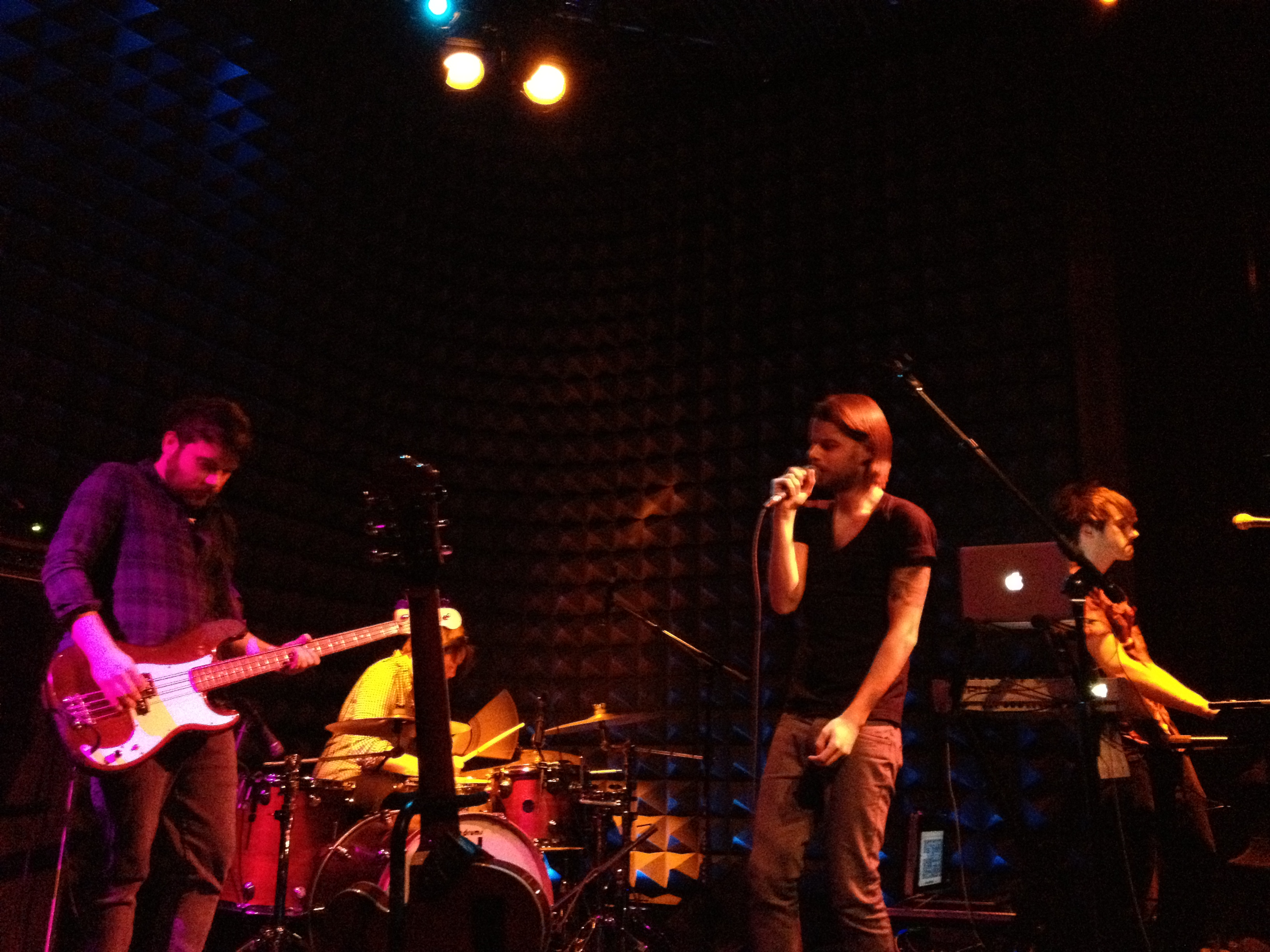
- Song of Return at Joe's Pub in New York City – 11 April 2012.

Background information
- Origin: Glasgow, Scotland
- Genre: Indie rock
- Years active: 2010–present
- Labels: Bloc+ Music; Kittiwake Music
- Members: Craig Grant (vocals/guitar), Louis Abbott (guitar/vocals), Alex McNutt (keyboards), Dave Reekie (bass), Peter Kelly (drums)
- Past members: Chris Gordon
- Website: www.songofreturn.com

Song of Return are a Scottish indie rock band from Glasgow. The band consists of Craig Grant (vocals/guitar), Louis Abbott (guitar/vocals), Dave Reekie (bass), Alex McNutt (programming/keyboards), and Pete Kelly (drums). Song of Return was the winner of the Tartan Clef Big Apple Award on 13 October 2011.

The band's live performances have been well received, with The Scotsman remarking that "the combined vocal prowess of Craig Grant and Louis Abbott, coupled with top drawer musicianship throughout the band, makes for an enthralling prospect."

== History ==
=== Formation and Limits LP (2010–2011) ===
The band was formed by Craig Grant and Chris Gordon (formerly of Baby Chaos) in 2010 after the dissolution of Scottish electronic/indie outfit Union of Knives. Grant and Gordon began writing music together and wanted to continue making music. Soon after forming, Chris Gordon decided he did not want to continue to play live. Afterward, Grant began to recruit other members to participate in writing and studio work, as well as provide a backing band for live shows. Producer, mastering engineer, and programmer Alex McNutt (of Glaswegian bands June and Paige. Louis Abbott (of Scottish indie-folk group Admiral Fallow) came in for guitar and vocals. Dave Reekie (of Scottish alternative pop outfit Otherpeople) was brought in to play bass, and Peter Kelly (of Scottish psychedelic rock trio Moon Unit and formerly of Single Helix ) was brought in to play drums. While Gordon continued to be referenced as a non-live member of the band, he is no longer listed among band members on the group's official Facebook page, while the live band is listed with equal billing to Grant as members.

The group's debut album Limits was released independently on 6 June 2011. The album featured 11 tracks and was released as a digital release as well as a limited CD release.

=== Trajectory EP and The Big Apple Award (2011–2012) ===
Song of Return were crowned victors of the 2011 Big Apple Tartan Clef Award as Best New Band at The Garage in Glasgow on 13 October 2011. The award was a competition between Scottish acts vying for the right to perform at the Scottish Music Awards in November 2011 and perform during Scottish Week 2012 in New York City. The award is a collaborative partnership between Nordoff-Robbins Music Therapy (a Scottish music charity), Creative Scotland, The American-Scottish Foundation, and Clash. Song of Return was selected over Laki Mera, Finding Albert, Wrongnote, and Woodenbox with a Fistful of Fivers.

On 5 December 2011, the band released the digitally distributed Trajectory EP, which featured a single edit of "Trajectory" from Limits, along with three previously unreleased tracks.

In March 2012, the band briefly allowed their fans a preview of a new track called "Trapped Inside The Night".

The band performed in New York City at Joe's Pub on 11 April 2012, and Mercury Lounge on 14 April 2012, with Scottish harpist/pianist/vocalist Phamie Gow opening. While in the United States, the band recorded one of their songs for Balcony TV in Brooklyn, New York.

== Discography ==
- Limits (6 June 2011)
- Trajectory EP (5 December 2011)

== Awards ==
=== Tartan Clef Awards ===
The Tartan Clef Awards are an annual music awards show in Scotland.

| Year | Nominee / work | Award | Result |
|---|---|---|---|
| 2011 | Song of Return | Creative Scotland Big Apple Award | Won |
