= DF Concerts =

Scottish music event promoter

DF Concerts Ltd.
- Founded: 1982
- Headquarters: Glasgow, Scotland, UK
- Area served: United Kingdom
- Products: Event promotion
- Website: dfconcertsandevents.com

DF Concerts & Events (formerly known as Dance Factory Concerts) is a music and event promoter, which is based in and operates across Scotland. The company was founded in 1982 in Dundee, Scotland as Dance Factory Concerts.

DF Concerts promote and manage the TRNSMT festival and owns and manages King Tut's Wah Wah Hut in Glasgow. The company previously organised T in the Park, The Edge Festival and Connect.

In 2010, it organised the Papal Mass in Bellahouston Park as part of Pope Benedict XVI's visit to the United Kingdom.
