= The Alphabet of Hurricanes =

Studio album by Tom McRae
- Released: 22 February 2010
- Genre: Rock
- Label: Cooking Vinyl

Tom McRae chronology
King of Cards (2007)	The Alphabet of Hurricanes (2010)

The Alphabet of Hurricanes is the fifth studio album from British singer-songwriter Tom McRae. It was released on 22 February 2010.

== Track listing ==
Professional ratings
Aggregate scores
Source	Rating
Metacritic	57/100
Review scores
Source	Rating
BBC	(average)
Drowned in Sound	5/10 stars
Uncut	3/5 stars
The Music Fix	8/10 stars
The Guardian	4/5 stars

1. Still Love You
2. A Is For...
3. Won't Lie
4. Summer of John Wayne
5. Told My Troubles to the River
6. American Spirit
7. Please
8. Out of the Walls
9. Me and Stetson
10. Can't Find You
11. Best Winter
12. Fifteen Miles Downriver
13. Opposite of Love (iTunes Bonus Track)
