= The Dials =

- Origin: Brighton, England
- Genres: Psychedelia, country, rock
- Years active: 2002–present
- Labels: Gear Discs
- Members: Dermot Watson; Andy Taylor; Joe Allenby-Byrne; Rich Parrish
- Past members: Martin Johnson; Steve Hanshaw; Andrew Pidgeon; Bob Cooper; Andy Davies; Gordon Russell
- Website: www.thedials.co.uk

The Dials are a British band formed in 2002 in Brighton, England. Their music is a mixture of psychedelia, country and rock.

== Details ==
The Dials released their debut self-titled album in 2007, which Americana UK describes as "A sprawling stylistically diverse work that is almost flawlessly executed ... An excellent debut."

Their second album, The Companions of The Rosy Hours, was released in June 2009. Shindig! magazine said: "A band that never throw themselves wildly on a great idea, but instead nurture and raise it in absolute perfection ... The Dials have made one of the most promising LPs in ages."

Their third album was released in October 2013 preceded by a single, "Rose Marie".

Andy Davies was previously a member of The Jennifers, and Gordon Russell spent six years as guitarist in Dr. Feelgood.

== Discography ==
=== Albums ===
- The Dials (2007)
- Companions Of The Rosy Hours (2009)
- The End Of The Pier (2013)
- That Was The Future (2017)

=== Singles and EPs ===
- The Coracle (EP) (2007)
- "Where Did Our Love Go" (single) (2007)
- "Watch Her Walk Away" (single) (2009)
- "Good Morning Mr Magpie" (single) (2009)
- "Rose Marie" (single) (2013)
- "Mondo Space" (single) (2014)
- "Cuckoo Stone" (single) (2017)
