= The Dykeenies =

Scottish indie rock band

- The Dykeenies playing at Homecoming Live: The Final Fling in Glasgow, Scotland

Background information
- Origin: Cumbernauld, Scotland
- Genres: Post-punk revival, indie rock
- Years active: 2005–2012, 2017
- Labels: King Tut's, Lavolta
- Members: Andrew Henderson; Brian Henderson; John Kerr; Alan Henderson
- Past members: Steven Ramsay; Graeme Hay
- Website: www.thedykeenies.com

The Dykeenies are a Scottish indie rock band from Cumbernauld, formed in 2005. The group consists of brothers Brian Henderson (vocals, synthesizers) and Andrew Henderson (bass guitar, backing vocals), along with Steven Ramsay (lead guitar, backing vocals) and John Kerr (drums, backing vocals). Since their formation, they have released one studio album, Nothing Means Everything, accompanied by three singles. After a worldwide tour, the band began work on their second album, which was released in October 2011. They broke up in January 2012, before re-forming for two performances in 2017. The Dykeenies released their EP 'I Wanted To Show Her All The Beautiful Things in the World' on 11 May 2018. The title of the 2018 EP was taken from Bret Ellis-Easton's 'American Psycho'.

== History ==
=== Beginnings and King Tut's (2005–2006) ===
The band played their first headline gig at the 350-capacity ABC2, a small venue in Glasgow in late 2005. In November 2005, they were named as the inaugural "Artist of the Month" in the Your Sound competition; a scheme run by Glasgow music venue King Tut's Wah Wah Hut along with DF Concerts to project local unsigned talent. A demo version of the song "New Ideas" was included in Have Yourself a Filthy Little Christmas, a compilation album released as a free download by independent record label Filthy Little Angels on 12 December 2005. They progressed to play an even bigger venue in Glasgow when they supported Mystery Jets at Glasgow's Queen Margaret Union (one of two Student unions of Glasgow University) on 3 May 2006.

After winning the Your Sound competition, the band signed to King Tut's Recordings. Again, despite having released little or no material at the time, the band were asked to play the "T Break" stage at T in the Park in Kinross, Scotland, on 9 July 2006. A week later, The Dykeenies released their first single, a double a-side "New Ideas/Will It Happen Tonight?". A video was recorded for the former track, featuring the band playing inside King Tut's Wah Wah Hut. In September 2006, the band signed to independent record label Lavolta Records.

Two months later, the band released their first EP through Lavolta, titled Waiting for Go. The release featured the title track, as well as tracks "Things You Cannot See", "Feels Like Sleep" and "Dark Time". It was produced by Jim Abbiss, who had previously worked with Arctic Monkeys, Kasabian and Bombay Bicycle Club; and mixed by previous New Order and Kaiser Chiefs collaborator Cenzo Townshend. Following the release of the EP, the band were invited by NME to play on the first ever four band O_{2} Rock N Roll Riot Tour, alongside The Horrors, The Fratellis and The Maccabees.

=== Nothing Means Everything (2007–2010) ===
The Dykeenies performing at King Tut's Wah Wah Hut in Glasgow

The band was given another boost into the musical limelight with the help from Xfm Scotland (now Galaxy Scotland). The radio station began by asking them to be a part of Xfm Scotland's first ever "Winter Wonderland" gig, one of three one-day winter music festivals taking place in venues across the United Kingdom. They were then called up again to support Maxïmo Park at Edinburgh's Liquid Room as part of "Xfm Live Sessions" on 31 March 2007.

Following numerous headline and support gigs in and around Glasgow between November 2006 and March 2007, The Dykeenies released a new recording of "New Ideas" on 9 April 2007, with previously unreleased tracks "Safe", "Simplify" and "Layers" featuring alongside various remixes as b-sides. The band marked the release with an extensive UK tour, including playing their first headline gig at Glasgow's QMU, a venue they had previously only played supporting Mystery Jets. This single was the band's first entry into the UK Singles Chart, reaching number 54. The band would release further singles "Clean Up Your Eyes" and "Stitches" between July and September 2007, reaching number 53 and 61, respectively.

The band released their debut album, Nothing Means Everything, on 17 September 2007. They would again play the QMU in support of the album, a concert which was originally booked for Glasgow's ABC, but was moved due to scheduling problems. During the concert, the band covered "Starman" by David Bowie, an artist they have stated as a major musical influence.

On 9 December 2008, The Daily Record announced that guitarist Alan Henderson had left the band, leaving over "musical differences". Vocalist Brian Henderson said that Alan was not seeing eye to eye on musical terms with the rest of the band. On 11 December 2008, the band announced a one-off date at King Tut's on 18 February 2009, their first gig since playing London's Underage Festival on 8 August 2008. The event sold out. A full tour was later announced, playing sixteen dates across the UK. Brian Henderson stated in an interview with The Daily Record that the band are currently experimenting with a number of new instruments, including bongo drums, acoustic guitars, and gospel choirs. Henderson added that the band are seven songs from finishing the album.

During the band's March tour, they included new songs "Awake", "Square Balloons", "Minus One", "Traps" and "Are You With Me Now?". The latter has been released as a free download through the band's website and MySpace. The band's new single "Sounds of the City" was released on 27 April 2009, with an instrumental version of the song as a B-side. As well as this, the band played a number of summer music festivals in 2009, including T in the Park, Summer Sundae, and the Loopallu festival in Ullapool.

=== Canyon of Echoes and split (2011–2012) ===
The band announced on 18 July 2011 via their Myspace and Facebook accounts that their new album Canyon of Echoes was released on 3 October 2011. They undertook a short UK tour to support the release. On 29 August 2011, they premiered the video for new single 'Awake' on their official Facebook and YouTube channel.

In January 2012, the Dykeenies announced their split.

=== Reunion, live shows and new EP (2016–present) ===
In November 2016, The Dykeenies Facebook page announced live shows set for May 2017. They have since confirmed that this is an official reunion and have new songs already written.

On 11 May 2018, The Dykeenies released a new EP titled 'I Wanted To Show Her All The Beautiful Things in the World'; their first new record since 2011.

== Musical style ==
The Dykeenies' musical style has been noted primarily as indie rock, with influences including The Cribs, Bloc Party and The Futureheads. Their musical style has also been compared to art rock and, more prominently, art pop. God Is in the TV Zine described "New Ideas" as sounding "like the first few tracks of Silent Alarm", as well as comparing "Will It Happen Tonight?" to We Are Scientists. Dykeenies have also stated that David Bowie is a major influence of the band, releasing a cover version of Starman as part of their Live at the Apple Store, Glasgow EP. One particular live review even linked the band to the short-lived "New Rave" genre, as well as comparing lead singer Brian Henderson's vocals to that of Brian Molko. Nothing Means Everything has been noted as being a more mature pop album, with "The Panic" in particular noted as having dark lyrical content.

== Discography ==
=== Studio albums ===
- Nothing Means Everything (2007)
- Canyon of Echoes (2011)

=== Extended plays ===
- Waiting for Go (2006)
- Live at the Apple Store, Glasgow (2007)
- I Wanted To Show Her All The Beautiful Things in the World (2018)

=== Singles ===
Year	Song	Album	UK Singles Chart
2006	"New Ideas/Will It Happen Tonight?"	non-album single	—
2007	"New Ideas" (reissue)	Nothing Means Everything	54
2007	"Clean Up Your Eyes"	Nothing Means Everything	53
2007	"Stitches"	Nothing Means Everything	61
2009	"Sounds of the City"	non-album single	—
2011	"Awake"	Canyon of Echoes	—

"—" denotes releases that did not chart.
