= King Tut's Wah Wah Hut =

Music venue in Glasgow, Scotland

Coordinates: 55.863°N 4.265°W

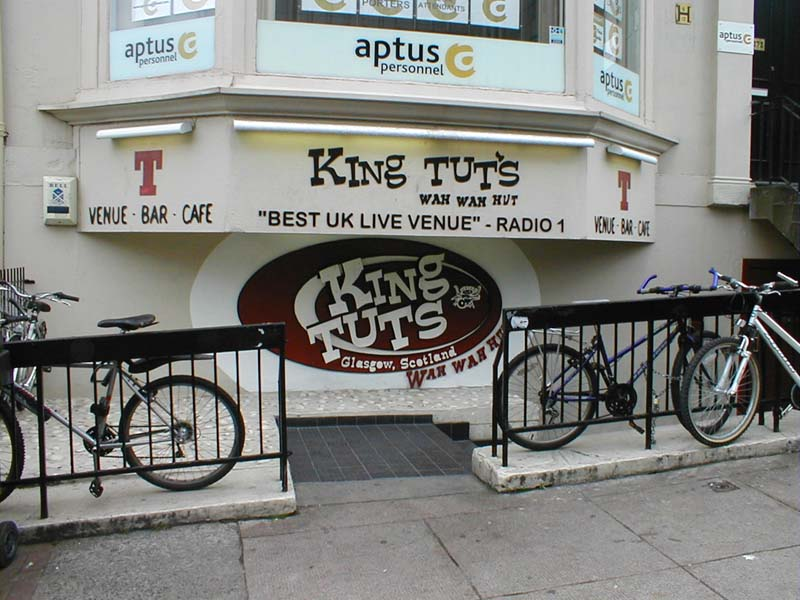
- Glasgow live music venue King Tut's Wah Wah Hut
- Interactive map of King Tut's Wah Wah Hut
- Location: Glasgow, Scotland
- Owner: DF Concerts
- Seating type: Standing
- Capacity: 300
- Type: Live Music Venue
- Events: Rock 'n' roll, indie rock, alternative rock

Construction
- Opened: February 1990
- Renovated: 2002

Website
- King Tut's official website

King Tut's Wah Wah Hut, also known as King Tut's, is a live music venue and bar on St. Vincent Street, Glasgow, Scotland. It is owned and managed by Glasgow-based gig promoters DF Concerts.

The Glasgow live music venue takes its name from a club in New York that hosted music, comedy and performing arts events in the 1980s.

== History ==
King Tut's was founded, in the former Saints and Sinners pub in St Vincent Street in the centre of Glasgow, by the DF Concerts boss Stuart Clumpas, who wanted to create a platform for promoting bands at club level, showcasing them with gigs seven days a week at a reasonable hour, after being unable to find such an establishment in the city centre's nightlife. The venue first opened its doors in February 1990, and has established a reputation for showcasing new talent and hosting many well-known bands' first Scottish appearances. This reputation was acquired early on in 1993 when The Verve, Radiohead and Oasis all played in the Glasgow venue in a two-week period and it was in this time when Oasis were discovered and signed by the record label Creation. According to the venue's manager, Dave McGeachan, the band "bullied their way on stage" after discovering that they would not be allowed to play despite travelling the long distance from Manchester.

Others who have played gigs at King Tut's early in their careers include Fiona Apple, Biffy Clyro, Coldplay, Beck, Blur, Crowded House, White Stripes, The Strokes, Franz Ferdinand, Skunk Anansie, Paramore, Lewis Capaldi and Travis, who played the live music venue regularly under their original name of Glass Onion.

Colin MacIntyre, the singer-songwriter from the Scottish indie band Mull Historical Society was reported as saying "you haven't made it unless you've played Tut's". The appeal and popularity of King Tut's has been credited to "its consistency and dedication to bringing a cross-section of different styles to Glasgow's doorstep"

In 1999 King Tut's decided to branch out with the launch of a monthly comedy night where comedians, including Phil Kay, Lynn Ferguson and Fred MacAulay, have taken to the stage, alongside some of Scotland's rising young comics.

In February 2000, the ten-year anniversary of the Glasgow live music venue was celebrated with a series of one-off concerts, parties and surprise guests running over ten days. Due to the success of the event, a £25,000 refurbishment of the upstairs bar was completed.

In November 2001, King Tut's was named Licensed Music Pub of the Year by the Scottish Licensed Trade News. It successfully applied for a 1am licence, which gave more time for performances.

In 2005, King Tut's held "The Best Scottish Bands of All Time" night, which featured acts such as Snow Patrol, Idlewild, Eugene Kelly and Colin MacIntyre.

From 17 to 21 December 2008, Idlewild performed a series of live shows at the venue, playing each of their albums on consecutive nights.

King Tut's Wah Wah Hut played host to the Homecoming Scotland 2009 Finale Celebrations in conjunction with the Clyde Auditorium.

In November 2017, the venue served as the location of the music video to former Oasis frontman Liam Gallagher's single "Come Back To Me".

== T in the Park and TRNSMT ==
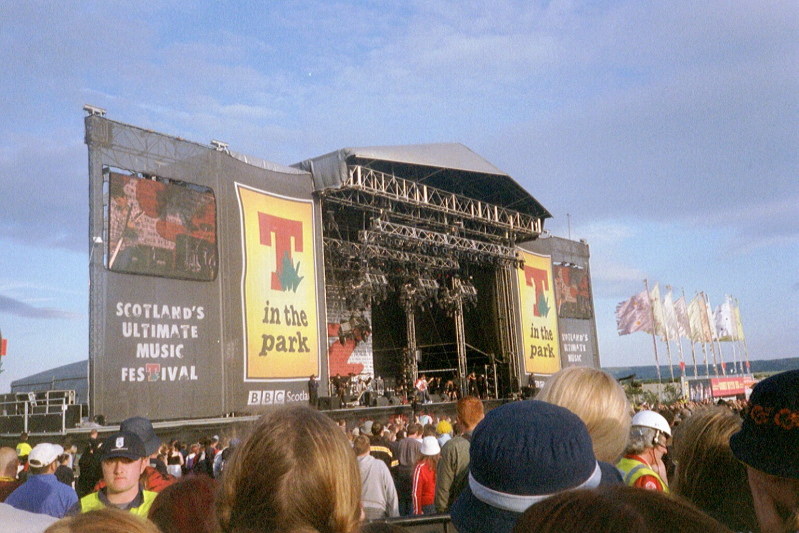
T in the Park 2002

King Tut's also ran King Tut's Wah Wah Tent at what was Scotland's biggest annual music festival, T in the Park, hosting many big acts. Their founder, Stuart Clumpas, now runs the festival. Over the years, acts such as the Manic Street Preachers, Teenage Fanclub, Snow Patrol, Doves, Primal Scream, Queens of the Stone Age, the Futureheads, the View, Jamie T, Dum Dums, Wheatus, Goldfinger, Twin Atlantic and the Pet Shop Boys have all performed on the stage.

Manic Street Preachers dedicated a song on stage to King Tut's after lead guitarist and vocalist James Dean Bradfield stated that "King Tut's was the first venue to treat us properly and give us hot food on tour".

Since the dissolution of T in the Park in 2017, the King Tut's stage has been moved to the successive festival, TRNSMT, where the stage serves as the second biggest at the Glaswegian Festival, hosting acts such as Gerry Cinnamon, Lewis Capaldi, Sam Fender, Example, Fontaines DC, Cavetown, Little Simz, Dylan John Thomas, Beabadoobee, M Huncho, Wet Leg, Jamie Webster, Bob Vylan, and many more

== Notable acts ==
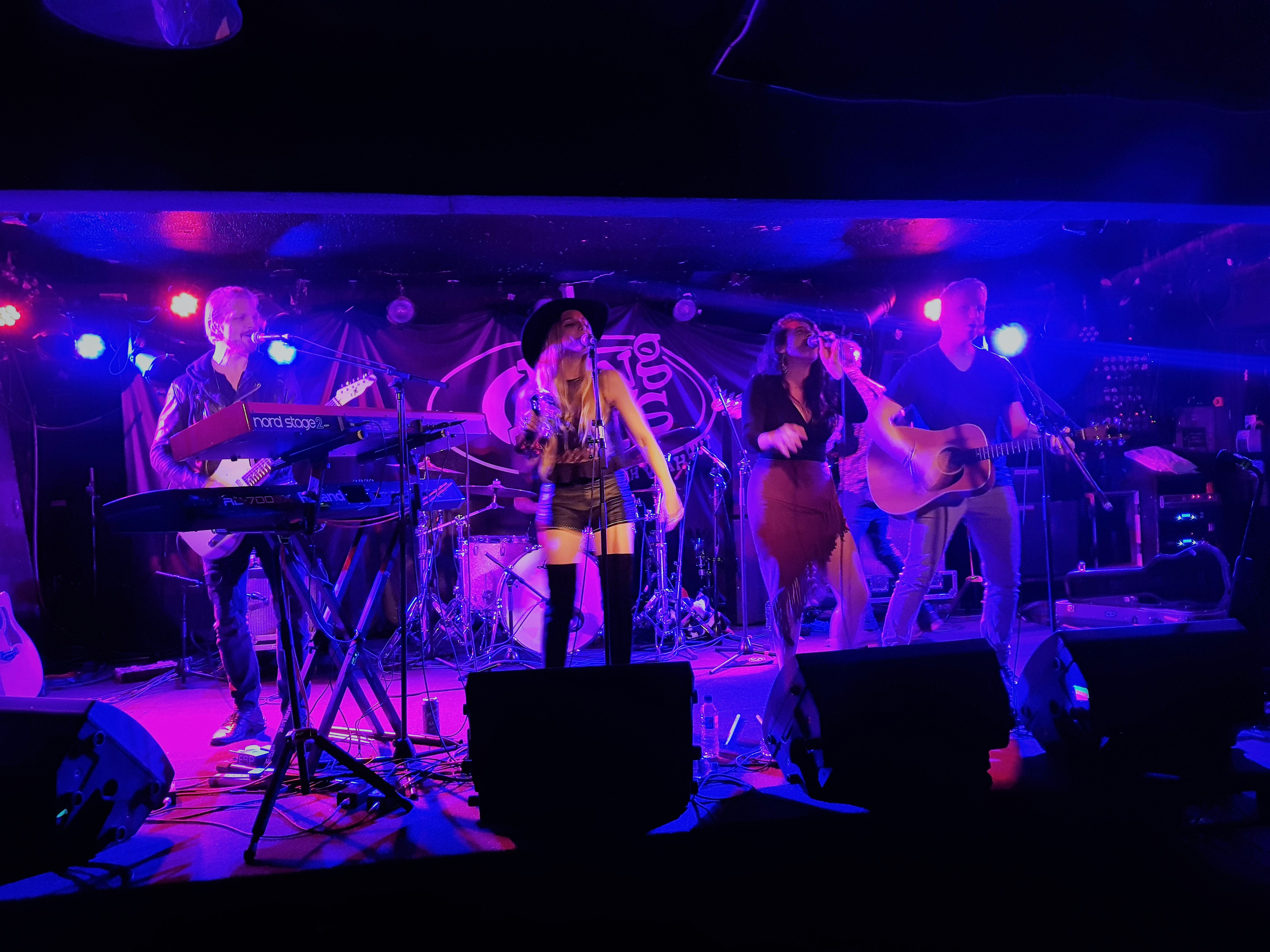
Delta Rae performing in 2018

Many famous acts have performed at King Tut's, including Amy Macdonald, Oasis, Rage Against the Machine, Biffy Clyro, Radiohead, Blur, Redd Kross, Travis, Pulp, The Verve, Crowded House, Wheatus, Average White Band, Goldfinger, Chuck Prophet and Beck. Paolo Nutini praised King Tut's variety: "I've never actually seen a big band at King Tut's, you know that? But it's the kind of place you can see anything. One night they'll have a really great band playing their ass off and the next there'll be a nice acoustic thing on. One gig I remember seeing there is Matt Berry, from The Mighty Boosh and Garth Marenghi. That just shows what a range of stuff you can find in Tut's."

In 2017 The View played a record run of six sold-out shows at the venue.

== Album ==
In 2011, singer-songwriter Tom McRae released an extended live album entitled Tom at Tut's featuring songs and banter from his gigs on two consecutive nights in November 2004.
