= Tom McRae =

English singer-songwriter

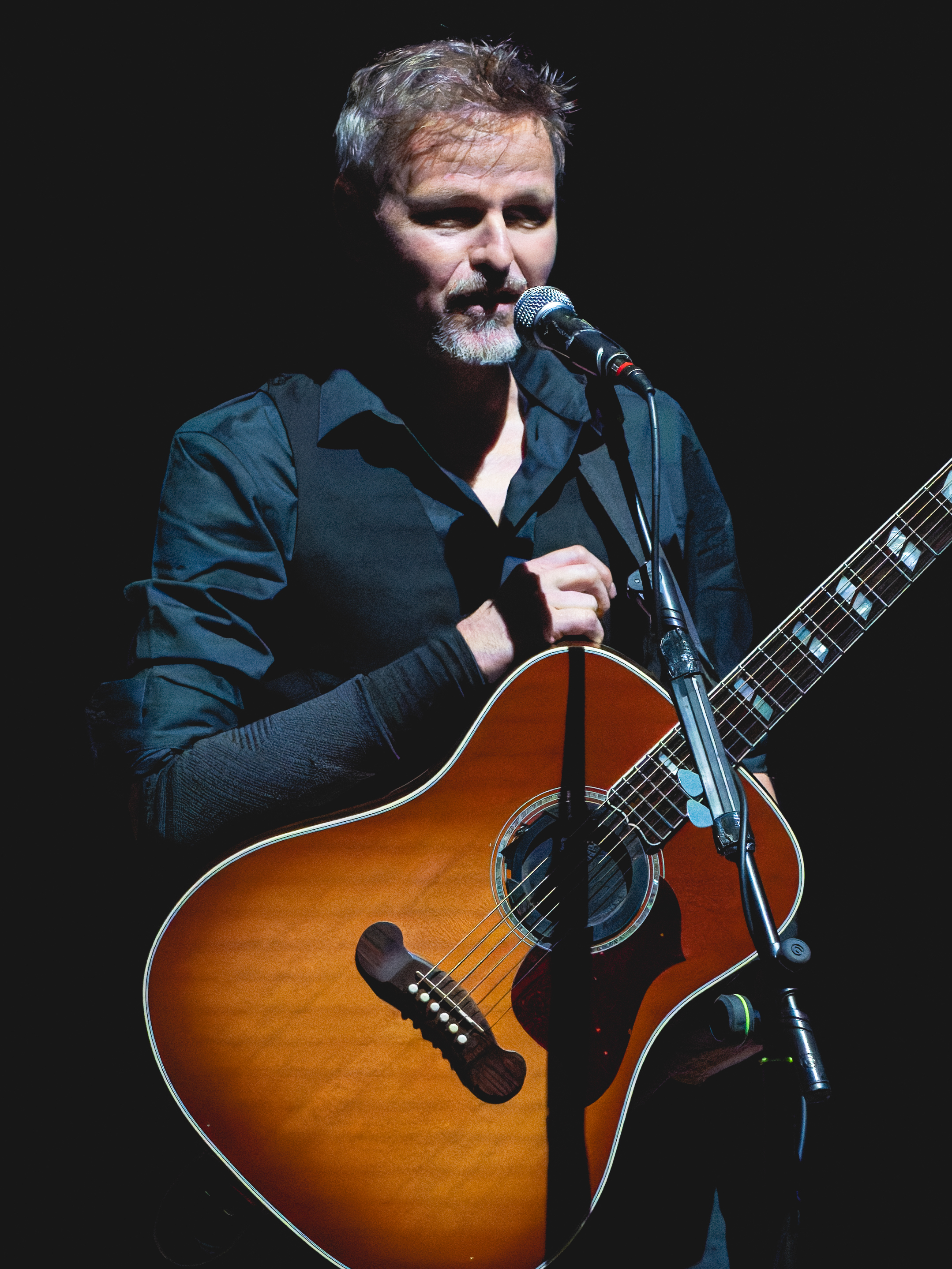
- McRae in 2024

Background information
- Born: Jeremy Thomas McRae Blackall; 19 March 1969 (age 57); Chelmsford, England
- Website: tommcrae.com

Jeremy Thomas McRae Blackall (born 19 March 1969), better known by his stage name Tom McRae, is an English singer-songwriter.

== Career ==
The son of two Church of England vicars, McRae sang in the church choir and as a teen experimented with his mother's guitar. Initially trying to emulate his heroes, Billy Bragg, Bob Dylan, Paul Simon, Neil Young, Kate Bush, U2, he began to write his own songs. At the age of 18, he went to City of London Polytechnic achieving a degree in politics and government, and forming his first band, "The Ministers of Orgasm". Subsequently, McRae was involved in bands "Raising Cain" and "Orchid Lounge". A chance meeting with recording engineer and record producer Roger Bechirian, (Elvis Costello, Squeeze, Carlene Carter, The Undertones), led to a working relationship. Bechirian helped to shape McRae's soft-spoken sound, which later gained McRae a deal with Dave Bates's db Records.

In 2000, director Scott Walker chose McRae to perform at the Meltdown Festival in the Royal Festival Hall. McRae gained nominations for the Mercury Prize, a Q magazine award and the BRIT Award for Best Newcomer.

McRae was working with Oliver ("Oli") Kraus, cellist, and in 2003 was joined by Olli Cunningham on keyboards. McRae's second album, Just Like Blood, was released in the UK in February 2003 produced by Ben Hillier. McRae then moved to California, where he wrote and recorded his next album, All Maps Welcome, which was released in May 2005.

McRae's fourth album, King of Cards, was recorded in Suffolk and released in May 2007.

McRae was a guest vocalist for the band "Wills and the Willing" at a number of festivals in the UK in summer 2008, and had a headline slot at the Offset festival in August. In autumn 2008, he toured the North Eastern states of America and Canada.

McRae's fifth studio album, The Alphabet of Hurricanes, was produced in his own recording studio, Gunpoint, in East London. The album was recorded over three years in varied settings, and, thanks to a deal with Cooking Vinyl was released in February 2010. The "Alphabet of Hurricanes" Tours, which sold-out at a number of venues, were rescheduled to fit in with the album release.

On 7 September 2013, instrumental music composed by McRae was performed as part of a multimedia art installation of video-artist Klaus Verscheure "14 EMOTIONS/Allegoria Via Dolorosa" by the Belgian group Spectra Ensemble at the Transformator/Happening (festival of metamorphosis) in Zwevegem, Belgium.

In 2014, among other writing projects, McRae wrote the song, "Love More or Less" for Marianne Faithfull's album, Give My Love to London and worked on his seventh album, "Did I Sleep and Miss the Border", released on 11 May 2015.

In 2024, McRae launched a podcast and archive section called MacRaetheisms, a nod to previous fan-made definitions of all things McRae-ish.

== Discography ==
=== Albums ===
- Tom McRae 2 October 2000 (db records)
- Tom McRae (Bonus CD Live at Bikini in Toulouse, France On 29 March 2001) 2001 (db records)
- Just Like Blood UK: 18 February 2003, UK #26; US: 21 September 2004 (db records)
- All Maps Welcome UK: 2 May 2005, UK #47; US: 31 May 2005 (RCA)
- King of Cards 14 May 2007 (V2)
- The Alphabet of Hurricanes 22 February 2010 (Cooking Vinyl)
- From The Lowlands (Alphabet of Hurricanes Part 2) 2012
- Did I Sleep And Miss The Border 2015
- Ah, the World! Oh, the World! 2017
- Étrange Hiver 2024

=== Live EPs albums collaborations ===
- Black Session (Live, 25 March 2003), 2005
- Tom McRae (Live 2007), 2007
- The Strongroom Sessions (EP Promo) (Live, 28 February 2007), 2007 (V2)
- Recorded at Gunpoint (EP Promo) 2010
- The Streetlight Collection (B-Sides & Rarities) 2010
- The Prospect Tapes (Original Demos Recorded in LA, 2004), 2010
- Tom at Tut's (Extended Live Album 2004 Full Band Tour), 2011
- Only Skin (collaboration with Lowri Evans) as Evans McRae May 2021

=== Singles and EPs ===
- "Sampler 2 Titres (French Magazine Magic! Promo)" 2000
- "The End of the World News" 2000
- "You Cut Her Hair" 2000
- "Fortress Radio Session (Live Promo)" 2000
- "A&B Song" / "Street Light" 2001
- "Turn On a Friend – Give Them This Disc (Promo)" 2001
- Cover Me. (3-track Promo EP) 2002
  1. "Sadly Beautiful"
  2. "Pale Blue Eyes"
  3. "Oh Yeah (On the Radio)"
- Four Songs from 'The Obscure' Nominee Brits (4-track Sampler) 2002
- "Just Like..." (Promo) 2002
  1. "A Day Like Today"
  2. "Sad Song For The Left Hand Alone"
  3. "You Cut Her Hair"
- "Karaoke Soul" 2002 – UK No. 48
- "A Day Like Today" (Promo) 2003
- "The Girl Who Falls Downstairs" 2005
  1. "The Girl Who Falls Down Stairs (Radio Edit)"
  2. "Lucy In The Sky With Diamonds"
- "Bright Lights" (Promo) 2007
- "Set the Story Straight" (Promo) 2007
- "Lipstick" (featuring Wills & The Willing) (Promo) 2008
- "Please" (Promo) 2010
- "Out of the Walls" (Download Promo) 2010
- "Still Love You" (Promo) 2010

== Other projects ==
McRae was once cast in an independent film as Gram Parson's ghost. Funding for the film fell through and all that remains is his screen test.

He also contributed a cover version of "Wonderful Christmastime" to the 2004 Christmas compilation album Maybe This Christmas Tree.

In August 2005, McRae visited the country of Niger in Africa at the request of The Observer and wrote an article about the famine titled, "This is not just another act of God – this is ingrained poverty".

McRae provided some of the vocals on "Lipstick", a 2008 single by "Wills and the Willing" having written parts of the song after listening to the original material. The song was written in response to the London bombings.

Along with Bob Harris, Guy Clark and others, McRae is one of the commentators on the film We Dreamed America, released as a DVD in 2008. This documentary examines the connections between British and American roots music.

McRae wrote the song, "Love More or Less" for Marianne Faithfull's album, Give My Love to London and worked on his seventh album, "Did I Sleep and Miss the Border" was due for release on 11 May 2015.

== Use of McRae's songs in film and television ==
McRae contributed music to the soundtracks of the movies Uno (2004) and Unsuitable (2005). His music also featured in the film The Bubble.

"São Paulo Rain" was featured in a sixth-season episode of Buffy the Vampire Slayer. The episode is entitled "Entropy."

"Set the Story Straight" was featured in a second-season episode of Kyle xy. "Still Lost" was featured in the third-season episode "Electric Kiss" of Kyle XY.

"I Ain't Scared of Lightning" was featured in the second season of British drama Skins.

"Karaoke Soul" and "Stronger Than Dirt" appear in the American television series Rescue Me and "Karaoke Soul" is featured in its soundtrack.

"2nd Law" and "You Cut Her Hair" were part of the soundtrack for the film Jekyll + Hyde.

"Walking 2 Hawaii" was used in Hollyoaks.

"You Only Disappear" was featured in an episode of the American drama Without a Trace.

"For The Restless" was used in one episode of the German television series Alles was zählt.

"You Only Disappear" was used for a contemporary routine choreographed by Dee Caspary on Season 7 of So You Think You Can Dance.

"Overthrown" was used in the third-season episode "Everyone Leaves" of Six Feet Under.

His cover of Wonderful Christmastime was used in the TV version of film Lost Christmas starring Eddie Izzard but was not used in the DVD version.

In 2018 he collaborated with fashion brand Kenzo for its fragrance Flower by Kenzo. "Sung by Kim Tae-Ri and San Francisco residents, [...] the track What a Way to Win a War is from his latest album. A real collaboration took place in which Tom McRae rewrote and reinterpreted part of the lyrics of his original piece, in order to bring them into resonance with the universe of FLOWER BY KENZO."

In 2020 McRae scored Adam & Eve, the second of a trilogy of art installations with Belgian artist Klaus Verscheure. This was performed in Paris for the Nuits Blanches Festival.

In 2022 "You Cut Her Hair" was featured in episode 4 of The English (TV series)
