= T in the Park =

Music festival in Scotland, 1994 to 2016

T in the Park Festival
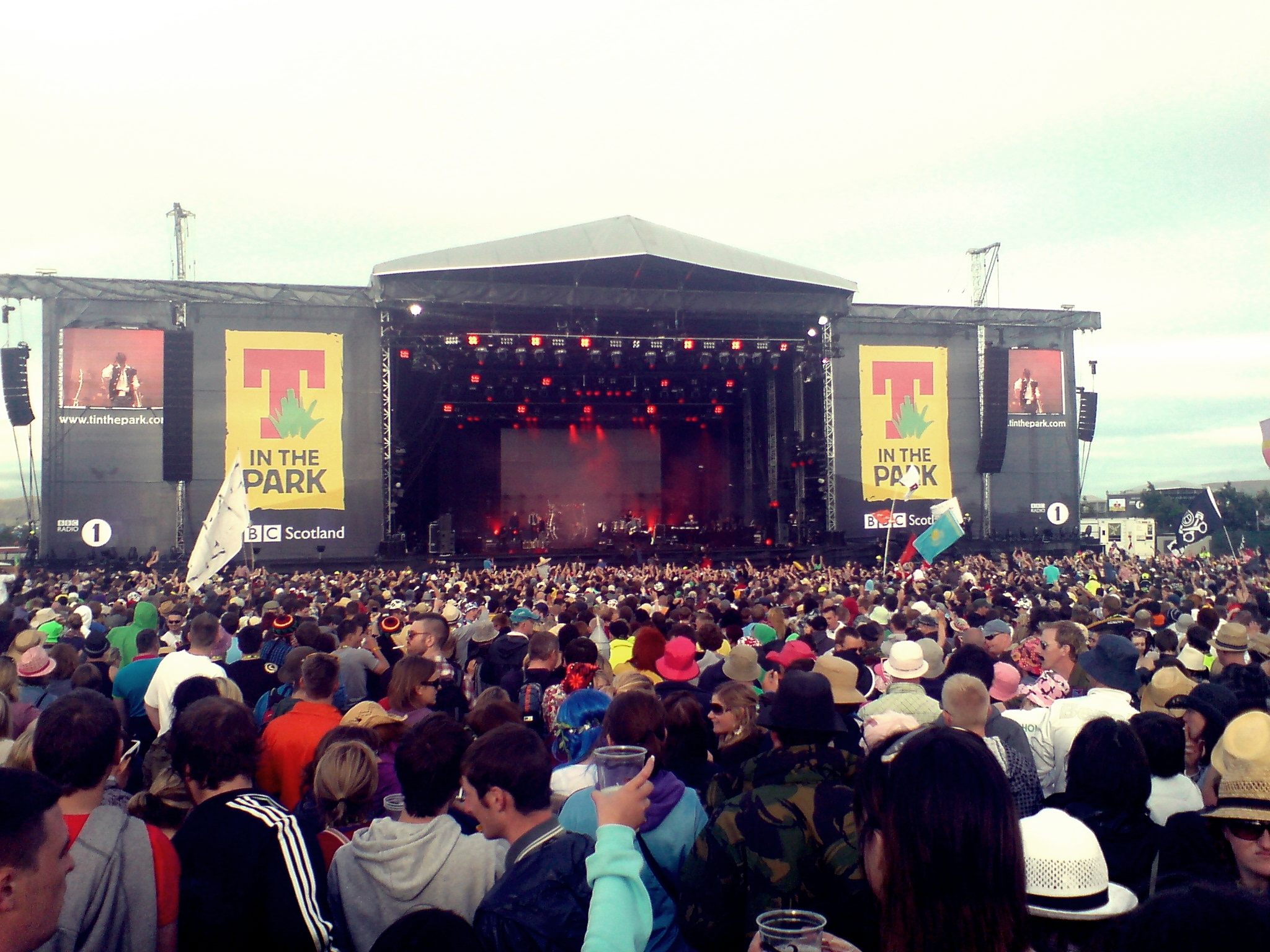
- Genre: Rock; indie; electronic; pop
- Dates: Second weekend of July (3 days)
- Locations: Scotland: Strathclyde Park, Hamilton, South Lanarkshire (1994–1996); Balado, Perth and Kinross (1997–2014); Strathallan Castle, Auchterarder, Perth and Kinross (2015–2016)
- Years active: 1994–2016
- Capacity: 70,000
- Website: www.tinthepark.com

T in the Park festival was a major Scottish music festival that was held annually from 1994 to 2016. It was named after its main sponsor, Tennents. The event was held at Strathclyde Park, Lanarkshire, until 1996. It then moved to the disused Balado airfield, Perth and Kinross, from 1997 to 2014. In 2015 the festival moved to Strathallan Castle. It was originally held over two days, and extended to three days from 2007. In 2016 the daily capacity was 70,000.

The 2017 T in the Park was cancelled due to problems at the 2016 event. It was officially replaced with the TRNSMT festival which takes place on the same weekend at Glasgow Green. The 2017 festival was a success and further editions of TRNSMT followed in 2018 and 2019. In July 2019, the festival organiser, Geoff Ellis, confirmed that T in the Park would not be returning.

== History ==
The festival was founded in 1994 by Stuart Clumpas and Geoff Ellis, as part of a joint venture between DF Concerts and Tennent's Lager with some help from Irish promotions company MCD Productions. Stuart Clumpas left as an organiser in 2001, selling his commercial interests in the concert.

Festival director Geoff Ellis was involved from the start until the end. Ellis came to Scotland in 1992 to manage King Tut's Wah Wah Hut in Glasgow. He organised the first T in the Park festival in 1994 with a smattering of bands playing to 17,000 people at its original site at Strathclyde Park, Lanarkshire. The festival was held there for three years until 1997, where it was held at the disused Balado airfield, Perth and Kinross. After moving to Balado the festival grew larger and by 2003, the festival was attracting up to 255,000 people; 110,000 over the weekend.

The festival was originally a two-day event until 2007, when the Friday became a mainstay event for live music. However, the 2007 festival was criticised by many festival-goers who missed acts on the Friday due to huge traffic jams of 10 miles on the A91 and A977 leading to Kinross. To prevent a repeat of the traffic chaos, in 2008 organisers allowed a limited number of campers to pitch up on the Thursday in order to cut the number of cars on the roads on the Friday. By extending the festival over a full three days, it began to grow rapidly, becoming the second-largest greenfield festival in the United Kingdom, and the fifth-largest in the world in terms of attendance, with over 85,000 people on site every day. In 2013 it attracted up to 255,000 people over three days, drawing fans from across Britain and Europe. According to DF Concerts, 20% of the crowd was made up of visitors from outside Scotland, with about 2% attending from overseas. In later years the festival shared much of its line-up with Oxegen, a festival that takes place on the same weekend in County Kildare, Ireland. Acts usually played T in the Park one day and Oxegen the next, or vice versa. In an attempt to boost ticket sales, the 2014 festival saw an extension of the acts' duration on stage. On the Friday, the acts were scheduled to start around lunchtime as opposed to 5 pm; and the Saturday headliners to finish at 1 am.

=== Move from Balado to Strathallan ===
The 2014 festival was the last to take place at the Balado site. Despite having run on the same site since 1997, safety concerns were expressed about the Forties Pipeline, which runs directly underneath the former Balado airfield.

In 2015 the festival moved 20.54 miles to the Strathallan Castle Estate. The 2016 event was marred by the deaths of three festival-goers and reports of anti-social behaviour problems at the campsite. This led festival bosses to cancel the 2017 event and, ultimately, all future T in the Park festivals.

=== Brewing ===
Tennents Lager for the T in the Park weekend was specially brewed 36 hours before the festival at the Wellpark Brewery in Glasgow, 44 miles from Balado. More than 3 million pints of lager were consumed at the festival during its existence.

A container recycling scheme was introduced in 2006, refunding a 10p deposit on every pint container brought back to a designated recycling point.

== 1994 festival ==
The first T in the Park was held on Saturday 30 July – Sunday 31 July 1994 at Strathclyde Country Park. The site had a capacity for 17,000 people on each of the two days, with just 2000 choosing to camp.

The Caledonia Stage, was introduced to showcase up and coming new bands. A band called Glass Onion played over the weekend who would later become Travis.

=== Main stage ===
| Saturday 30 July | Sunday 31 July |
| Rage Against the Machine; Björk; Levellers; Cypress Hill; Crash Test Dummies; Chumbawamba; Yothu Yindi; Consolidated; Honky; Paul Oakenfold | Primal Scream; Del Amitri; Teenage Fanclub; Crowded House; The Saw Doctors; Gun; Grant Lee Buffalo; Aimee Mann – pulled out; Baby Chaos |

=== King Tut's Tent ===
| Saturday 30 July | Sunday 31 July |
| Blur; Manic Street Preachers; Pulp; James Taylor Quartet; S*M*A*S*H; Headswim; The Grid; Kerbdog; AC Acoustics | D:Ream; House of Pain; One Dove; Whiteout; Oasis; Mike Peters; Thrum; Tiny Monroe |

== 1995 festival ==
Was held on Saturday 5 August – Sunday 6 August 1995 at Strathclyde Country park. This was the first year there was a sell out on one of the days. Noel Gallagher joined Paul Weller on stage, while Kermit from the Black Grape had broken his ankle earlier in the day but refused to go to hospital instead performed with the rest of the band whilst sitting down on the stage.

The Dance Tent was introduced this year, but no official line was used, it became the Slam Tent in 1997.

=== Main stage ===
| Saturday 5 August | Sunday 6 August |
| Paul Weller; Therapy?; Terrorvision; The Prodigy; Black Grape; Gene; Dodgy; The Wildhearts Cancelled, replaced with The Almighty.; Skunk Anansie | M People; The Beautiful South; Kylie Minogue; Tricky; The Charlatans; Shed Seven; Marion; The Radoos |

=== King Tut's Tent ===
| Saturday 5 August | Sunday 6 August |
| Elastica; Supergrass; Echobelly; Menswear; The Bluetones; Ash; Powder; Corduroy; Cast | Salad; The Verve; dEUS; The Shamen; Underworld; Dreadzone; Fluke; Republica |

== 1996 festival ==
Was held on Saturday 13 July – Sunday 14 July 1996, and was the last time at Strathclyde Country park. The Saturday was a sell out for the first time in advance. Radiohead closed the Main Stage on Saturday night and Pulp closing on the Sunday. This was also the year that Keanu Reeves arrived on a shuttle bus to play the festival with his band Dogstar, and Joe Strummer busked in the campsite

Caledonia Stage was renamed the T Break, where unsigned acts from across Scotland were given a platform to showcase their music at T in the Park. Each year, a panel made up of music industry experts hand-picked 16 artists from over a thousand entries to platform.

=== Main stage ===
| Saturday 13 July | Sunday 14 July |
| Radiohead; Alanis Morissette; Prodigy; Foo Fighters; Space; The Jesus Lizard; Honeycrack; The Supernaturals; Cecil | Pulp; Black Grape; Cast; Manic Street Preachers; Ricky Ross; Saw Doctors; Barenaked Ladies; Shakespeare's Sister; Bobbie Bluebell; Whipping Boy; Placebo |

=== NME Stage ===
| Saturday 13 July | Sunday 14 July |
| Bluetones; Beck; Frank Black; Mazzy Star; The Gyres; Northern Uproar; 60 Ft Dolls; Gorky's Zygotic Mynci; Geneva | Cocteau Twins; Teenage Fanclub; Dogstar; Bis; The Wannadies; Mansun; Super Furry Animals; Fluffy; Urusei Yatsura |

=== Dance Tent ===
| Saturday 13 July | Sunday 14 July |
| Leftfield; DJ: David Holmes; Chemical Brothers; Dave Clarke; The Aloof; Definition Of Sound; Rub-A-Dub DJs Wilba & Martin; Lamb; DJ: Harri; Audioweb; DJ: Scott Gibson; 4th Dimension; DJs: Tony Kean & Murray Scott | LTJ Bukem; Goldie; Lionrock; Paul Oakenfold; BT; Nicolette; Earthling; DJ: KMC; Suga Bullit; DJ: KMC; J-Pac |

=== King Tut's Tent ===
| Saturday 13 July | Sunday 14 July |
| The Divine Comedy; The Cardigans; Lush; Heavy Stereo; Drugstore; Rare; Compulsion; Crazy Gods Of Endless Noise; Mundy; The Daisies | Afghan Whigs; Dubstar; Longpigs; Ian Mcnabb & The Afterlife; Nowaysis; No Doubt; Kula Shaker; Octopus; Nut; Nilon Bombers |

== 1997 festival ==
In 1997, T in the Park moved from Strathclyde Park to its home for the next 17 years, Balado near Kinross, on a disused Airfield, and was held on Saturday 12 July – Sunday 13 July 1997. This was The Slam Tent's first year, while The campsite grown to over 25,000.

=== Main stage ===
| Saturday 12 July | Sunday 13 July |
| The Charlatans; Kula Shaker; Dodgy; Reef; G.U.N.; The Divine Comedy; Republica; Apollo 440 | Paul Weller; Ocean Colour Scene; Texas; Bush; Echobelly; Bjorn Again; Fun Lovin' Criminals; Neneh Cherry; The Sirenes |

=== NME Stage ===
| Saturday 12 July | Sunday 13 July |
| Shed Seven; Placebo; Longpigs; Geneva; Sneaker Pimps; Travis; Jimi Tenor; Superstar; Arab Strap; Feeder | The Seahorses; Mansun; Gene; Dreadzone; The Supernaturals; Catatonia; Hurricane # 1; Toaster; Rachel Stamp; Cake Like |

=== Slam Muzik Tent ===
| Saturday 12 July | Sunday 13 July |
| Laurent Garnier; Daft Punk; DJ Sneak; Slam (Live); Andrew Weatherall; Nightmares On Wax; Paul Cawley; Olive; Jon Carter | Carl Cox; Bandulu; Slam: Stuart McMillan & Orde Meikle; Green Velvet; DJ Deep; Death In Vegas; Global Communication; Gilles Peterson |

=== Radio 1 Eve Sesh ===
| Saturday 12 July | Sunday 13 July |
| The Delgados; Symposium; Monaco; Gorky's Zygotic Mynci; Subcircus; Stereophonics; Grass – Show; Mogwai; Arnold; Radish | Beth Orton; Spearhead; Urusei Yatsura; Embrace; Kenickie; AC Acoustics; Speedy; Bennet; Hardbody; Snug; Delta |

== 1998 festival ==
T In The Park 1998 was held on Saturday 11 July 1998 – Sunday 12 July 1998. Large television screens were used to allow football fans to watch the 1998 World cup final.

Line up included;

=== Main stage ===
| Saturday 11 July | Sunday 12 July |
| Prodigy; The Seahorses; Robbie Williams; Space; Travis; Catatonia; JTQ; Headswim; Martyn Bennett | Pulp; Beastie Boys; Garbage; Finley Quaye; James; Stereophonics; Chumbawamba; Alabama 3 |

=== NME Stage ===
| Saturday 11 July | Sunday 12 July |
| Ash; Spiritualized; Super Furry Animals; Audioweb; Ultrasound; Rialto; Theaudience; Young Offenders; Annie Christian | Portishead; Ian Brown; Natalie Imbruglia; Bernard Butler; The Aloof; Asian Dub Foundation; The Smiles; Scott 4; Medal |

=== Slam Tent ===
| Saturday 11 July | Sunday 12 July |
| Darren Emerson; Plastikman; Slam (DJs): Stuart Mcmillan & Orde Meikle; Laurent Garnier (Live); Harri; Carl Craig's Innerzone Orchestra; DJ Crush; DJ Q | A Tribe Called Quest; Fabio & Grooverider; Propellerheads; DJ Touche; Red Snapper; Monkey Mafia; Phar Out DJs; Invisible Armies |

=== Radio 1 Eve Sesh ===
| Saturday 11 July | Sunday 12 July |
| Bentley Rhythm Ace; Lo Fidelity Allstars; Warm Jets; Arab Strap; Montrose Ave; Idlewild; Campag Velocet; Dandys | Cornershop; Fatboy Slim; Symposium; Unbelievable Truth; Money Mark; 60 ft Dolls; Gomez; Carrie; Regular Fries |

== 1999 festival ==
It was held on Saturday 10 July 1999 and Sunday 11 July 1999, with 50,000 people per day. Two days before, it was revealed few tickets were still available for the Sunday performances.

=== Main stage ===
| Saturday 9 July | Sunday 10 July |
| Blur; Stereophonics; The Beautiful South; Fun Lovin' Criminals; Joe Strummer & The Mescaleros; Faithless; 3 Colours Red; The Amphetameanies | Manic Street Preachers; Massive Attack; James; Placebo; Reef; Barenaked Ladies; Eagle Eye Cherry; Remy Zero |

=== Stage 2 ===
| Saturday 9 July | Sunday 10 July |
| Gomez; Shed Seven; Travis; Rae & Christian; Lamb; Regular Fries; Ooberman; The Jengaheads (DJs); Boom Boom Mancini | Happy Mondays; Bjorn Again; Gay Dad; Everlast; The Saw Doctors; Dot Allison; Younger Younger 28's; Muse; Merz |

=== Slam Tent ===
| Saturday 9 July | Sunday 10 July |
| Jeff Mills; Richie Hawtin Aka Plastikman (Dex, Fx And A 909); Luke Slater (Live); Slam's "Pressure Funk"; Basement Jaxx; DJ Sneak; Slam (DJs): Stuart Mcmillan & Orde Meikle; Silicone Soul | Fat Boy Slim (DJ); Carl Cox; Green Velvet (Live); Cassius (Mix); Marco Carola; Ian Pooley (Live); Harri; Roots; Freddy Fresh; Paul Cawley (Fenetik) |

=== King Tut's Tent ===
| Saturday 9 July | Sunday 10 July |
| Mogwai; Death In Vegas; Bis; The High Fidelity; Chicks; Surreal Madrid; Doves; Rico; Witness | Mercury Rev; Idlewild; Delgados; Deus; Darkstar; Indian Ropeman; Stroke; Bellatrix; One Lady Owner |

== 2000 festival ==
This was held on Saturday 8 and Sunday 9 July 2000, with 50,000 people attending. It was Travis' first appearance, as an unsigned band closed the Main Stage. It was All Saints' last Scottish appearance.

== 2001 festival ==
T in the park 2001 was held between Saturday 7 and Sunday 8 July 2001, with approximately 50,000 people attending.

== 2002 festival ==
The 2002 event attracted approximately 50,000 people on both the Saturday and Sunday.

== 2003 festival ==
The 2003 event attracted approximately 55,000 people on both the Saturday and Sunday, with REM and Coldplay.

== 2004 festival ==
The 2004 edition attracted approximately 60,000 people on both the Saturday and Sunday. The two biggest stages being the Main Stage and the NME Stage, along with four tents which included the Slam Tent and the King Tut's Tent.

== 2005 festival ==
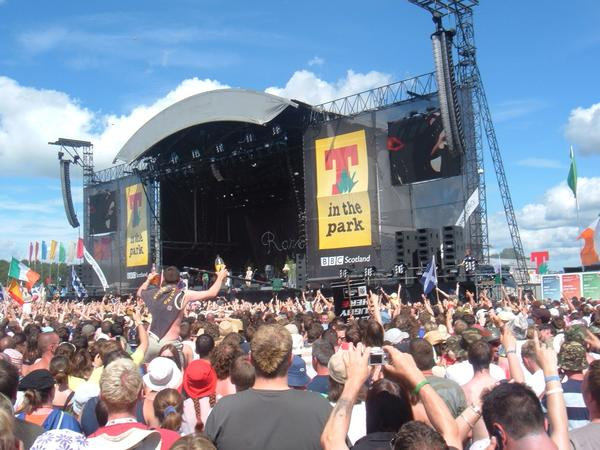
2005 Festival

Tickets for the 2005 event sold out in record time, just four days after going on sale, five months in advance of the festival. The event saw around 69,000 people a day watching more than 170 bands over 10 stages. It was named best festival in that year's UK Festival Awards, beating the Glastonbury Festival for the first time.

== 2006 festival ==
Tickets for the 2006 festival went on sale at 9 am on 17 February 2006. The event sold out in under an hour, a record time for the festival. An additional 12,000 day tickets were placed on sale on 3 June 2006, which sold out in ten minutes. Approximately 69,000 tickets were sold for each day. Following the sellout, weekend camping tickets appeared on internet auction sites for as much as £700.

== 2007 festival ==
The 2007 festival took place on 6, 7 and 8 July 2007 – the first time the festival had been held over three days. The first 35,000 tickets went on sale shortly after the 2006 festival and were sold within 70 minutes. The final batch of tickets, released on 9 March, sold out in less than 20 minutes. The event was overshadowed by traffic chaos on the A91 due to the closure of the main car park following heavy rain.

== 2008 festival ==
The 2008 festival took place on 11, 12 and 13 July 2008. It was announced that the campsite would open on 10 July 2008 to avoid a repeat of the previous year's traffic problems. The bands headlining the 2008 event were Rage Against the Machine, The Verve and R.E.M. on the Main Stage and The Chemical Brothers, Kaiser Chiefs and The Prodigy on the Radio 1 / NME Stage.

== 2009 festival ==
The 2009 festival took place over three days between 10 and 12 July, with over 180 acts performing to a crowd of 85,000 people. As with the 2008 festival, the campsite opened on the Thursday evening to prevent traffic queues forming on the Friday. The first batch of "early bird" tickets sold out in ten hours on 15 July 2008 and on 27 February 2009, NME announced that camping tickets for the event had already sold out.

== 2010 festival ==
Tickets for the 2010 event were made available on 26 February 2010, selling out in 90 minutes. The event was headlined by Muse, Eminem and Kasabian.

== 2011 festival ==
The 2011 festival took place between 7 and 11 July 2011. Arctic Monkeys, Coldplay, Foo Fighters and Beyoncé were the headliners for the weekend. It is the eighteenth festival to take place. The Strokes played on the Radio 1 NME stage on the Saturday. Blink-182 cancelled as they were unable to produce their new album in time for their European tour. On 5 May, Beyoncé was added to the line-up, and played on Saturday the 9th. Other artists such as Deadmau5 and Pendulum played at T in the Park 2011.

== 2012 festival ==
The 2012 festival took place between 6 and 8 July 2012. As usual presale tickets went on sale shortly after the conclusion of the 2011 event, on 12 July 2011, with another allocation of "early bird" tickets going on sale to the general public two days later, on 14 July 2011. The Stone Roses were announced as the first headline act on 8 November, three weeks before the second release tickets went on sale. On 30 November, Vodafone customers who were signed up to the "Vodafone VIP" site were granted access to a pre-sale. The next day, T-Lady subscribers and past festival goers were also given access to the pre-sale. The second release tickets, equivalent to half of the venues capacity, went on sale to the general public on 2 December at 9 am, hours later allocation was exhausted. Festival director, Geoff Ellis said that he was "delighted by the response from fans" and also noted that he "can’t wait to see everyone at Balado next year."

This year introduced the Cabaret Tent (billed as the "Cabaret Club") which ran a programme of cabaret, circus, and comedy (in association with The Stand Comedy Club).

== 2013 'T20' festival ==
The 2013 festival took place between 11 and 14 July 2013 and was advertised as T20 due to the festival's 20th anniversary. 'Early Bird' tickets went on sale Friday 13 July 2012 at 9 am on the Ticketmaster website. The Killers, Rihanna and Mumford and Sons headlined in 2013, alongside other large acts including Emeli Sandé, The Script, Jake Bugg, Alt-J, Of Monsters and Men, Twin Atlantic, Two Door Cinema Club and Azealia Banks. The second batch of tickets went on sale on 7 December at 9 am. The final batch went on sale on 22 February at 9 am. On 13 February 2013, German electronic band Kraftwerk were added to the line-up.

== 2014 festival ==
The 2014 festival took place between 10 and 13 July 2014. The festival was to be the last at the Balado site due to the Forties pipeline system issue involving gas pipes that run underneath the field.

Sheffield rockers, Arctic Monkeys were announced first as headline act and closed the festival on Sunday, with Scotland's Biffy Clyro and Calvin Harris headlining Friday and Saturday. Other acts on the bill include Pixies, Ed Sheeran, Paolo Nutini, Paul Weller, The Human League, Pharrell Williams, Ellie Goulding, Tinie Tempah, Franz Ferdinand, Elbow, James and Charlotte OC.

T in the Park was granted a late music license for 2014 which allows the music to continue until 1 am instead of 12 am like previous years. Music on Friday also started earlier this year, with the arena opening at lunch time instead of the regular 5 pm start

== 2015 festival ==
In 2015 the festival was moved to brand new site, at Strathallan Castle. The first headline act to be announced were The Libertines and shortly after other headliners Kasabian and Noel Gallagher's High Flying Birds, along with other acts including Jessie J, Avicii, Hozier, Sam Smith, The Vaccines, and Twin Atlantic. There has been a lot of negative feedback and media attention regarding the new site, with travel delays being a major issue due to the lack of trackway in grass car parks and drop off areas.

== 2016 festival ==
=== Main Stage ===
| Friday 8 July | Saturday 9 July | Sunday 10 July |
| The Stone Roses; Disclosure; Courteeners; James Morrison; Fun Lovin' Criminals; Alessia Cara; The Temperance Movement | Calvin Harris; Bastille; The Last Shadow Puppets; Jess Glynne; Tinie Tempah; Jack Garratt | Red Hot Chili Peppers; Chase & Status; Faithless; James Bay; Slaves; The Lighting Seeds; Rogue Orchestra – David Bowie Tribute |

=== Radio One Summer Of Dance Stage/Radio 1 Stage ===
| Friday 8 July | Saturday 9 July | Sunday 10 July |
| Alesso; Pete Tong; Oliver Heldens; Danny Howard; Hannah Wants; Annie Mac; Krept & Konan; Oh Wonder; WSTRN | The 1975; Catfish & The Bottlemen; Kaiser Chiefs; Disciples; Rat Boy; DMA's; Spring King | LCD Soundsystem; Major Lazer; Jake Bugg; Maximo Park; Nathaniel Rateliff & The Nigh Sweats; Blossoms; Sunset Sons |

=== King Tut's Wah Wah Tent ===
| Friday 8 July | Saturday 9 July | Sunday 10 July |
| Jamie XX; Frightened Rabbit; Rodrigo y Gabriela; Bear's Den; The Coral; Augustines; Gerry Cinnamon | Travis; Tom Odell; Bay City Rollers; Stiff Little Fingers; Shed Seven; Fatherson; Foy Vance | Diplo; Craig David's TS5; Frank Turner & The Sleeping Souls; John Grant; FIDLAR; Dua Lipa |

=== Slam Tent ===
| Friday 8 July | Saturday 9 July | Sunday 10 July |
| Len Faki; DVS1; Ricardo Villalobos bsb Raresh; Petrichor (live); Silicone Soul | Richie Hawtin; Slam (DJs): Stuart Mcmillan & Orde Meikle; Nina Kraviz; Guy Gerber; Skream; Daniel Avery; B.Traits | Jeff Mills; Chris Leibing; Seth Troxler; Pan-Pot; Speedy J; Marcel Dettmannn; Scuba |

=== T Break Stage ===
| Friday 8 July | Saturday 9 July | Sunday 10 July |
| The Amorettes; Ash; JP Cooper; Izzy Bizu; The Telermen; Bloodlines; Scope; The Ninth Wave; Forever | Maxi Jazz & E-Type Boys; The Struts; Basement; Vant; JR Green; Frances; Miracle Glass Company; The Vegan Leather; Scholesy; Mt. Doubt; Redolent; Domiciles | The Lapelles; The Sherlocks; Hey Hello; BORNS; Sweaty Palms; Declan Welsh; Foreign Fox; Indigo Violet; Edwin Organ; Tongues; Colonel Mustard and the Dijon 5 |

== See also ==
- List of electronic music festivals
- List of music festivals
