= London Calling (festival) =

Music festival in Paradiso, Amsterdam

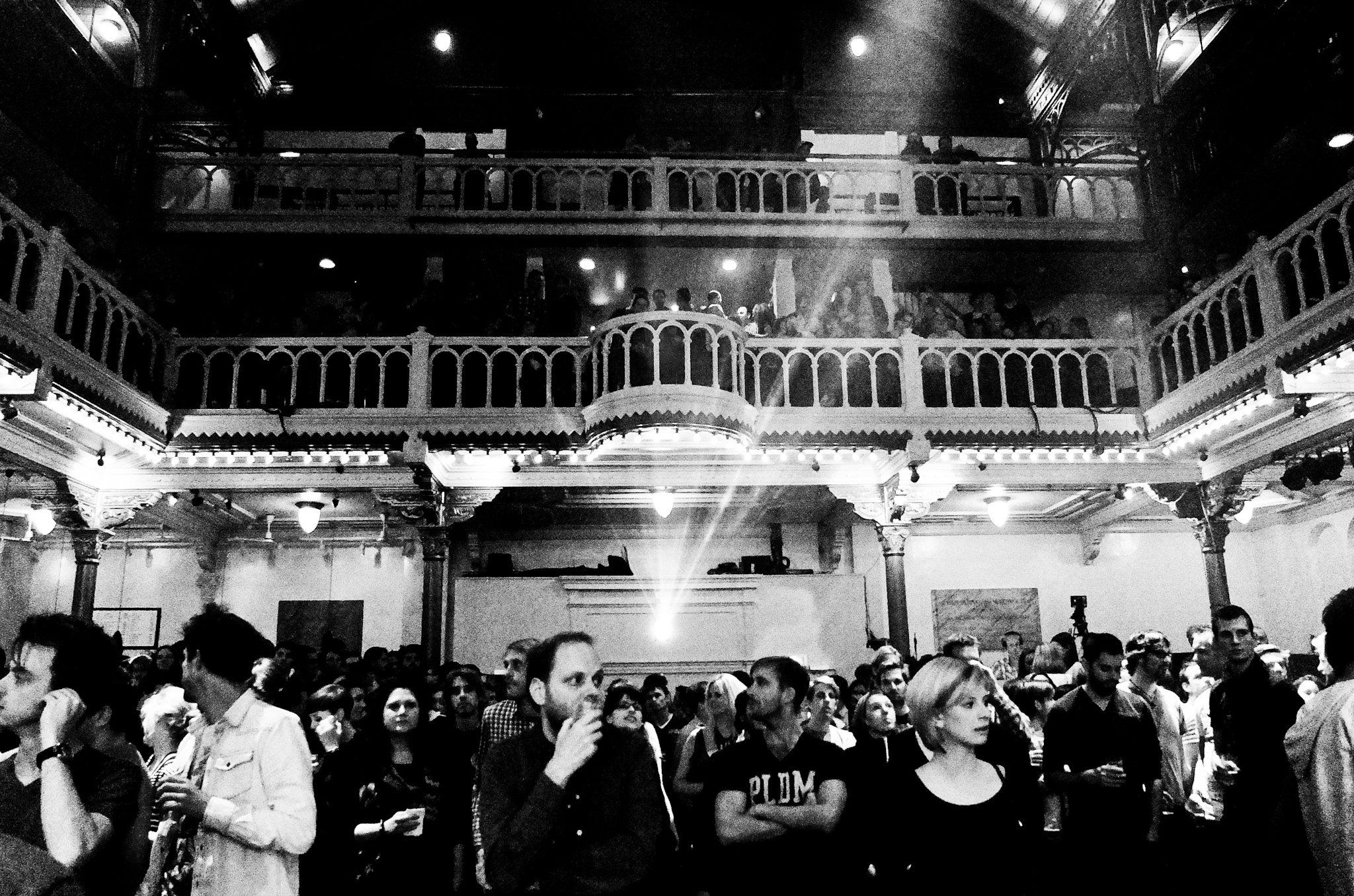
London Calling Festival (2012)

London Calling is a music festival held twice a year in Paradiso, Amsterdam and focuses on the latest trends and bands in music, with the main focus on the UK. Since the festival started in 1992 it has been acknowledged as the main showcase festival of the Netherlands for British music and is therefore seen as the gateway to a breakthrough in the Benelux for promising, new British bands. The name of the festival is taken from the famous third album by English punk band The Clash.

The festival was first held in 1992 with four bands (including the Jennifers, the band that later renamed itself into Supergrass) and was organised yearly ever since. In the first decade and a half the festival focused mainly on the latest British bands with an occasional non-British act and turned into the country's main showcase festival for new British music. Bands like Kaiser Chiefs, The Darkness, Franz Ferdinand, Supergrass, Blur, Editors, Bloc Party, Suede, The Libertines, Placebo, Ash, Skunk Anansie, Snow Patrol and Klaxons among others, played the festival before their breakthrough. For a lot of these bands it was their first gig in Amsterdam or even outside of the UK. Because of the chance to see soon-to-be-big bands play in a relatively small venue (capacity: 1500 for the big room, 300 for the small room) the festival usually sells out quickly.

The last few years the festival has broadened its concept and not only focuses on the latest British bands, but on new bands/acts and trends in general, be it rock or dance music. This has resulted in the festival now boasting about 25 bands over two days, or over 35 acts in 2007 and 2009, when the festival lasted for three days. Various theme nights under the London Calling moniker have been organised at the venue, including 'London Calling Presents Artrocker Artrocker' and 'London Calling Goes Glasgow'. The originator–program director of the festival is Ben Kamsma.

In 2007 the festival won the England Rocks! Award by tourism agency Enjoy England for its continuous support for British music.

== Editions ==
Edition	Line up
25 July 1992	Bardots, Some Have Fins, Jennifers and Swervedriver.
10 April 1993	Dreamscape, Werefrogs, Moonshake and God Machine.
13 October 1993	Sun Dial, Delicious Monster, Chapterhouse, Dodgy, Elevate and Rollerskate Skinny.
22 April 1994	Blur, Slowdive, Jacob’s mouse, Beatnik Filmstars, Big Geraniums and Auratone, Land of Barbara
5 November 1994	Ash, Salad, Powder, Huge Baby, Done Lying Down and Dodgy.
13 May 1995	Skunk Anansie, Delicatessen, Weekenders, Detrimetal, Bandit Queen, Blameless and Sultans of Ping.
17 Februari 1996	Babybird, Catatonia, Elcka, In Aura, The Gyres, Placebo and Thrum.
7 and 8 June 1996	Bis, Jack, Dodgy, 60 Ft. Dolls, Northern Uproar, Gorky’s Zygotic Mynci, Collapsed Lung, Bawl, Super Furry Animals, Strangelove, Compulsion, Babychaos, Bennet and Scarfo.
17 and 18 January 1997	Space, Yatsura, Silver Sun, Beth Orton, These Animal Men, Laika, Mansun, Octopus, Midget, Laxtons Superb, Jocasta, Heavy Stereo, Kenickie, Sterling, Pusherman and Audioweb.
6 and 7 June 1997	The Driven, Elcka, Gold Blade, Hurricane #1, Jesus Jones, The Karelia, Linoleum, My Life Story, Pecadiloes, Salad, Silver Sun, Sophia, Stereophonics, Subcircus, Supernaturals, Three Colours Red, Travis and Warm Jets
18 and 19 June 1998	Carrie, Embrace, Headswim, Jack, Midget, Montrose Avenue, Mover, Nuff Said, Pecadiloes, Sunhouse and Symposium.
2 and 3 October 1998	Sway, Spearmint, Hefner, Imogen Heap, Kent, Sophia, Federation, Bob Sinclar, Lemming, Paradise Motel, Addict, Ballroom, Astrid, The King and Rialto
10 and 11 December 1999	Delakota, Cousteau, Little Mothers, Witness, Astrid, Clint Boon Experience, Velvet Belly, The Prayer Boat, Appliance, Terris, Orange Can, Laika and Sneaker Pimps.
21 and 22 April 2000	Velvet Belly, Ben Christophers, Feeder, Echoboy, Chicks on Speed, Tocotronic, Broadcast, Doves, Terris, Autopulver, Beulah, JJ72 and Bluetones.
18 November 2000	Mount Florida, Mo Solid Gold, Tahiti 80, Lowgold, Brassy, Ac Acoustics, Fuzz Light Years, Birthday and Urusei Yatsura
14 April 2001	South, Lift To Experience, Sandy Dilon, I Am Kloot, Super Heroes, Elf Power, Snow Patrol, Ladytron and Experimental Popband.
15 and 16 March 2002	Simian, St. Thomas, Ikara Colt, Am 60, Desert Hearts, Saybia, British Sea Power, Melys, Trailer Bride, The Bees, Jacob Golden Band, Free Heat and Haven.
9 November 2002	Kournakova, Baxter Dury, Obi, The Frames, The Apples in Stereo and The Libertines
19 April 2003	Delays, Buffseeds, Damien Rice, Hoggboy, Echoboy, Eastern Lane, The Rocks, 22-20s and The Futureheads
7 and 8 November 2003	Joy Zipper, The Mountaineers, Patrick Wolf, Electric Shocks, The Hells, The Barbs, The Veils, Fiery Furnaces, Hawksley Worksman, M.A.S.S., Sluts of Trust, The Darkness, Franz Ferdinand
27 March 2004	The Veils, The Keys, Oceansize, The Zutons, The Boxer Rebellion, Dogs Die In Hot Cars, The Stands, The Blueskins, The Duke Spirit.
12 and 13 November 2004	Future Kings of Spain, 22-20s, Bloc Party, The Bravery, James Yorkston & The Athletes, The Dears, The Departure, The Subways, Art Brut, The Rakes, Sons and Daughters, The Go! Team, Hal, Aberfeldy.
29 and 30 April 2005	Thirteen Senses, Neils Children, The Chalets, Eastern Lane, The Longcut, Editors, Kaiser Chiefs, IAMX, Tunng, New Rhodes, Help She Can't Swim, Nine Black Alps, Black Bud, Engineers, The Others, Tom Vek, The Cribs, Whitey, Do Me Bad Things.
4 and 5 November 2005	The Zutons, White Rose Movement, Kid Carpet, Queen Adreena, Brakes, The Race, Alfie, Field Music, Test Icicles, Duels, ¡Forward, Russia!, Guillemots, Infadels, Clor, Dogs, Battle, Chikinki, Amusement Parks on Fire.
10 February 2006 (Artrocker edition)	Theoretical Girl, Kaito, Ladyfuzz, Shitdisco.
29 March and 1 April 2006	Bromheads Jacket, The Futureheads, My Latest Novel, We Start Fires, The Cinematics, The Sunshine Underground, Good Shoes, Howling Bells, The Long Blondes, The Kooks, Larrikin Love, Mystery Jets, Dirty Pretty Things, Noisettes, Tiny Dancers, Humanzi. Cancelled: Young Knives, Black Wire
29 April 2006 (Queen's Day edition)	Moke, The Immediate, Last Man Standing, Misty's Big Adventure, The Pipettes, Dustin's Bar Mitzvah, The Rifles, Shitdisco.
24 and 25 November 2006	Little Man Tate, The Rifles, Milburn, Boy Kill Boy, Young Knives, Klaxons, Fortune Drive, Metronomy, The Bees Sound Collection, The Holloways, 747's, Five O'Clock Heroes, The Pigeon Detectives, Fields, The Maccabees, Guillemots, Bromheads Jacket, Jamie T, The Automatic, Mumm-Ra, The Oxfam Glamour Models, 1990s, Lotus Lullaby.
31 December 2006 (New Year Edition)	RAT:ATT:AGG, Hot Club de Paris, Misty's Big Adventure, Lo-Fi-Fnk, Metronomy, The Presidents of the USA.
30 and 31 March 2007	The Long Blondes, Kate Nash, My Luminaries, The Pigeon Detectives, The Twang, The Wombats, Solarise, South Central, These New Puritans, Our Lunar Activities, We Are the Physics, The Enemy, Air Traffic, Silvery, Ox.Eagle.Lion.Man, The Strange Death Of Liberal England, The Violets, The Kissaway Trail, The Switches, Victorian English Gentlemen's Club, Moke, GoodBooks, Harrisons. Cancelled: The Maccabees, The Aliens
1 June 2007 (Glasgow edition)	1990s, Bricolage, DeRosa, Malcolm Middleton, Mother And The Addicts, Popup, We Are the Physics.
6 July 2007 (5 Days Off edition)	The Whip, Junior Boys, dan le sac vs Scroobius Pip, The Teenagers, Late of the Pier, Does It Offend You, Yeah?, Goose, Bonde do Rolê, Diplo, Soil & the Pimp Sessions.
2 'till 4 November 2007	New Young Pony Club, Foals, Look See Proof, XX-Teens, Black Affair, Friendly Fires, Scouting for Girls, Clocks, The Maccabees, The Rakes, Assembly Now, Blood Red Shoes, Video Nasties, Sonny J, Dragons, Prinzhorn Dance School, The Wombats, Los Campesinos!, Jack Peñate, Reverend and The Makers, Ihe Displacements, Underground Heroes, The Runners, Noah and the Whale, The Dykeenies, Derek Mein. Cancelled: Dananananaykroyd, The Metros
25 and 26 April 2008	Exile Parade, The Metros, Florence and the Machine, Make Model, Blood Red Shoes, Dead Kids, Ipso Facto, Get Shakes, Mystery Jets, The Ting Tings, Baltic Fleet, The Answering Machine, Cage the Elephant, Joe Lean and the Jing Jang Jong, The Rascals, Let's Wrestle, Broken Records, Late of the Pier, Get Cape. Wear Cape. Fly, Video Nasties, One Night Only, Pete and the Pirates, Johnny Foreigner, Friendly Fires.
30 April 2008 (Queen's Day edition)	¡Forward, Russia!, Bettie Serveert, Cheeky Cheeky and the Nosebleeds, Hatcham Social, Peggy Sue and the Pirates, Scram C. Baby, Silvery, The Stutters, The Courteeners, Young Knives.
12 'till 15 November 2008	Cajun Dance Party, Van She, John & Jehn, Hatcham Social, The Presets, Amazing Baby, Friendly Fires, Wild Beasts, Electricity In Our Homes, The Courteeners, frYars, The Hot Melts, Late of the Pier, The Pan I Am, Ladyhawke, Slow Club, Trouble Andrew, White Lies, White Denim, The Late Greats, Maths Class, Findo Gask, I Blame Coco, Noah and the Whale, Baddies, Bombay Bicycle Club, Bromheads Jacket, Esser, Glasvegas, Magistrates, Twisted Wheel, A Place to Bury Strangers.
30 April 'till 2 May 2009	The Airborne Toxic Event, Fight Like Apes, Filthy Dukes, Golden Silvers, Delphic, Lowline, Pulled Apart by Horses, Jessie Rose Trip, Stricken City, Two Door Cinema Club, James Yuill, The Big Pink, Dananananaykroyd, Flashguns, The Temper Trap, Grampall Jookabox, The xx, Fanfarlo, Marina and the Diamonds, Noisettes, Joy Formidable, Red Light Company, The Asteroids Galaxy Tour, Chew Lips, Chrome Hoof, The Cinematics, Frankmusik, Threatmantics, The Phantom Band, Maps, Eugene McGuinness, Micachu, Team Waterpolo, The Backhanded Compliments, Amazing Baby. Cancelled: Erol Alkan, Little Boots, Passion Pit.
20 and 21 November 2009	We Were Promised Jetpacks, Beth Jeans Houghton, Johnny Foreigner, Little Death, Esser, Four Dead In Ohio, MPHO, The Boxer Rebellion, The Leisure Society, Sad Day for Puppets, The Twilight Sad, Violens, Jack Peñate, Wild Beasts, Alberta Cross, A Place to Bury Strangers, Phenomenal Handclap Band, Pyramiddd, King of Spain, Mirrors, Bombay Bicycle Club, Kid Harpoon.
23 and 24 April 2010	Darwin Deez, Doll & The Kicks, Detroit Social Club, Esben And The Witch, Stornoway, Hudson Mohawke, A Sunny Day in Glasgow, Fool's Gold, And So I Watch You from Afar, We Have Band, Chapel Club, Cosmo Jarvis, Erland and the Carnival, Joe Worricker, Villagers, Everything Everything, Egyptian Hip Hop, Tubelord, Balthazar, Emanuel and the Fear, General Fiasco, Errors. Cancelled: Lonelady, The Hundred In The Hands, the Depreciation Guild, The Features, Holly Miranda
12 and 13 November 2010	We Are Scientists, Villagers, Jaill, Race Horses, North Atlantic Oscillation, The Futureheads, Frankie and the Heartstrings, Ratatat, Is Tropical, Rolo Tomassi, Airship, The Knocks, Linda Farquhar, Lulu & The Lampshades, Warpaint, Good Shoes, The Rumour Said Fire, Yuck, Beach Fossils, Factory Floor, Wavves, Tame Impala, The Hundred in the Hands, Summer Camp en The Neat.
20 and 21 May 2011	Twin Shadow, The Fresh & Onlys, Cat’s Eyes, the Crookes, Wolf People, Wild Beasts, Cloud Nothings, Flash Guns, Holy Ghost!, Ariel Pink’s Haunted Graffiti, The View, Rachel Sermanni, Trophy Wife, 2:54, Foster the People, Cults, Dry The River, Sparrow And The Workshop, Braids, Cloud Control, Ra Ra Riot en Ty Segall
11 and 12 November 2011	Natty, Alex Clare, Rats on Rafts, Hard-Fi, Azealia Banks, All The Young, Caged Animals, Friends, Will and the People, Netherlands, History of Apple Pie, Jamie N Commons, Dog Is Dead, Anothers Blood, Shields, I.R.O.K., Other Lives, Dum Dum Girls, Wolf Gang, The Rapture, Washed Out, Wise Blood, An Horse, Spector, Breton, Veronica Falls, Exitmusic, Big Deal, Spectrals.
18 and 19 May 2012	Grimes, Howler, King Charles, Au Palais, Austra, CITIZENS!, Last Dinosaurs, Zulu Winter, Evian Christ, Trust, Oberhofer, Kassidy, Foe, Breton, Team Me, King Krule, Spector, Hooded Fang, Electric Guest, Willis Earl Beal, Clock Opera, Porcelain Raft, The Big Sleep, Japandroids, DZ Deathrays, China Rats, New Look.
2 and 3 November 2012	Hooded Fang, Cloud Nothings, Twin Shadow, The Joy Formidable, Haim, Gravenhurst, Gross Magic, AlunaGeorge, TOPS, Stubborn Heart, Temples, Bobby Tank, Kodaline, Jessie Ware, Wild Nothing, The Walkmen, Micachu & The Shapes, Exitmusic, Peace, Opossom, Melody’s Echo Chamber, Theme Park, Savages, Chromatics, Ratking.
24 and 25 May 2013	Palma Violets, Echo Lake, METZ, Swim Deep, Mount Kimbie, RDGLDGRN, The Family Rain, Egyptian Hip Hop, Charlie Boyer & The Voyeurs, Guards, Vondelpark, Velociraptor, Unknown Mortal Orchestra, Lord Huron, The Griswolds, Beach Fossils, Two Gallants, Team Ghost, Evans The Death, SOHN, The Phoenix Foundation, Lewis Watson, Drenge, Mykki Blanco, Superfood.
1 and 2 November 2013	The Dodos, Mac DeMarco, Porcelain Raft, Findlay, Circa Waves, Taymir, Ball Park Music, Kid Karate, Wampire, Dan Croll, Younghusband, Koreless, Darkstar, Popstrangers, AUDIOCULTURE AFTERPARTY, Jagwar Ma, MS MR, London Grammar, Fyfe, Outfit, Papa, Nadine Shah, Lulu James, Bleached, Torres, Cub Sport, Rainy Milo, Glass Animals, KILL ALL HIPSTERS AFTERPARTY.
9 and 10 May 2014	Happyness, The Proper Ornaments, San Fermin, Kins, The Trouble with Templeton, Folly and the Hunter, Teleman, Hospitality, Wolf Alice, Menace Beach, Jungle, The John Steele Singers, Ryan Keen, Gambles, Telegram, The Bohicas, Childhood, Desperate Journalists, Royal Blood, Wild Cub, Arthur Beatrice, Public Access TV, The Neighbourhood, Solids, The Fat White Family, The Delta Riggs.
31 Oct 1 Nov 2014	Wild Smiles, Gap Dream, Wild Child, Gengahr, DMA's, Bad Breeding, Lola Colt, The Amazing Snakeheads, Bohicas, Southern, Kate Boy, Saint Motel, Coves, Racing Glaciers, Sebadoh, D.D. Dumbo, The Mispers, Fever the Ghost, Josef Salvat, Nimmo, Spoon, Shura, Fractures.
24 and 25 April 2015	Lusts, Spring King, The Slow Show, SOAK, Happyness, Jagaara, Slaves, Moon Duo, The Districts, Broncho, Fool's Gold, Karin Park, Charlie Cunningham, Hannah Lou Clark, As Elephants Are, Marika Hackman, Jack Garratt, Hooton Tennis Club, The Dø, Jane Weaver, of Montreal, Vaults, Drenge, Cosmo Sheldrake.
30 and 31 October 2015	The Big Moon, INHEAVEN, Mike Krol, Marlon Williams, Charlotte OC, LA Priest, Plastic Mermaids, Pumarosa, Dornik, Chastity Belt, Formation, White, Bully, Låpsley, Holy Holy, Circa Waves, Swim Deep, The Jacques, Spiritualized, Waxahatchee, Lower Dens, Kurt Vile, Howard.
11 and 12 March 2016	Jono McLeery, Fufanu, Amber Arcades, The Vryll Society, Palehound, Plastic Mermaids, Otherkin, The Jacques, Black Honey, Kid Wave, Autobahn, Joan Shelley, Cigarettes After Sex, Vök, Roch, Island, Coasts, Coves, Ultimate Painting, Pumarosa, Miamigo, Nothing But Thieves, Shame
28 and 29 October 2016	Soren Juul, Health and Beauty, Hoops, Silversun Pickups, Vaults, Allah Lahs, Adia Victoria, Wild Beasts, Drowners, Alex Cameron, Nilufer Yanya, Communions, Gold Class, Porches, Isaac Gracie, Flyying Colours, Explosions in the Sky, Scott and Charlene's Wedding, Twin Peaks, Lucy Dacus
26 and 27 May 2017	British Sea Power, The Districts, Black Honey, The Courtneys, Palace, HMLTD, Miya Folick, Gold Class, Ron Gallo, Gabriella Cohen, Fazerdaze, POND, White, Traams, Skegss, Kane Strang, Flyying Colours, Föllakzoid, Priests, Goat Girl, Hazel English
27 and 28 October 2017	Alex G, Alex Lahey, Bec Sandridge, Big Thief, Cabbage, Cameron Avery, Chasity, Diet Cig, Downtown Boys, Frankie Rose, Gold Connections, Harlea, HAUS, Hurray For The Riff Raff, Insecure Men, Japanese Breakfast, Joe Fox, Kolars, Makeness, Marlon Williams, Matt Maltese, Pinegrove, Savoy Motel, Slow Dancer, Starcrawler, Superorganism, Vagabon, Weaves, Yak, Yowl
25 and 26 May 2018	Bodega, Boniface, Boy Azooga, City Calm Down, Didirri, Findlay, Flyte, Frankie Cosmos, Husky Loops, Loma, Mattiel, Melkbelly, Moaning, Now, Now, Palm, Porridge Radio, Rolling Blackouts Coastal Fever, Rosborough, Sinkane (dj-set), Snail Mail, Snapped Ankles, Stella Donnelly, Velvet Volume, Warmduscher, Yungblud
26 and 27 October 2018	The Academic, Kakkmaddafakka, Hookworms, The Garden, Viagra Boys, The Chats, The Parlotones, Phum Viphurit, Avalanche Party, A Giant Dog, The Howl & The Hum, Elias, Heaters, Ancient Shapes, Valley Maker, Hater, Jo Passed, FONTAINES D.C., Laps, Yuno, Crumb, Anemone, Sink Ya Teeth, Jess Williamson, Buzzy Lee, Honey Harper, Sam Evian, ViVii, Mellah, Helena Deland
24 and 25 May 2019	A.A. Bondy, Anemone, Another Sky, Blank Banshee, Body Type, CHAI, Close Talker, Corridor, G Flip, Emerson Snowe, Gently Tender, Hand Habits, Hayden Thorpe, Jesse Mac Cormack, Jonathan Bree, Just Mustard, Muncie Girls, Ohtis, Penelope Isles, Pottery, Priests, Rosborough, Sophie & The Giants, Still Corners, Stonefield, The Howl & The Hum, Tia Gostelow, Tomberlin, Tropical Fuck Storm, Weakened Friends
25 and 26 October 2019	The Twilight Sad, The Murder Capital, Squid, Yak, Khana Bierbood, Heavy Lungs, Night Moves, Bess Atwell, Barrie, Westerman, Sheer Mag, County Line Runner, W.H. Lung, Do Nothing, RVG, Imperial Wax, Automatic, Orville Peck, Far Caspian, Blue Stones, Helado Negro, EUT, Larkins, Disq, Ada Lea, Personal Trainer
29 and 30 October 2021	Chubby & the Gang, Coach Party, George O’Hanlon, Molly Payton, NewDad, Odd Morris, Peeping Drexels, Personal Trainer, PVA, REX, Talk Show, The Chisel, The Lottery Winners, The Lovely Eggs, The Ninth Wave, The Rhythm Method, The Zen Arcade, Tiña, Wodan Boys
20 and 21 May 2022	Aaron Smith, Automotion, Cash Savage And The Last Drinks, CMAT, Courting, Dora Jar, Ducks Ltd., Ethan P. Flynn, Ian Sweet, Illuminati Hotties, Kills Birds, Lime Garden, Lunar Vacation, MICHELLE, Penelope Isles, Pist Idiots, Silverbacks, Surfbort, The Clockworks, The Heavy Heavy, TOPS, Water From Your Eyes, Wet Leg
