= Fantastic Plastic Records =

UK record label

Fantastic Plastic Records is an independent record label based in London and Brighton.

Fantastic Plastic was formed by lifelong music fan Darrin Robson in a County Down attic. Originally specialising in mail-order only rare and collectible records, it soon grew into the opening of two independent local record shops before making the move to release the label's debut vinyl EP by Cork's finest The Sultans Of Ping FC in 1991. Further releases soon followed by bands such as Television Personalities, The Blue Aeroplanes and Ash before the label relocated to London going on to work with bands such as Ikara Colt, Guillemots and The Futureheads.

Aside from the label FP are also an artist management company FP MUSIC representing Villagers who have been shortlisted on two occasions for the Mercury Prize for their first two albums Becoming a Jackal and Awayland. The company also set up a publishing wing and signed Luke Haines; they currently represent the majority of The Auteurs back catalogue.

== Artists ==
- The Auteurs - publishing
- Ash
- Aerial
- Angelica
- Astrid
- Autopop
- Backwater
- Bearsuit
- The Beat Up
- The Black Arts
- The Blue Aeroplanes
- Bricolage
- Buffseeds
- William Campbell & Kevin MacNeil
- Chow Chow
- Fyfe Dangerfield
- The Futureheads
- Guillemots
- Luke Haines
- Help She Can't Swim
- Ikara Colt
- I Like Trains
- The Immediate
- The Kittens
- Kite Monster
- Kubichek!
- Kyte - publishing
- New Cassettes
- The North Sea Scrolls
- Oppenheimer
- Pharmacy
- Race Horses
- The Sinking Citizenship
- The Strange Death of Liberal England
- The Sultans Of Ping FC
- Television Personalities
- You Say Party! We Say Die!
- The Victorian English Gentlemens Club
- Villagers
- The Wannadies

== Discography ==
=== Singles and EPs ===
- [FP001] The Sultans Of Ping (FC) - What About Those Sultans! EP
- [FP002] The Blue Aeroplanes - Up In A Down World EP
- [FP003] Television Personalities - You, Me and Lou Reed EP
- [FP004] Ash - "Get Ready"
- [FP005] Autopop - "Being Seen"
- [FP006] The Wannadies - "Hit"
- [FP007] Kite Monster - "Rubber Doll"
- [FP008] Astrid - "No Reason"
- [FP009] Backwater - "Earthly Faces On Alien Places"
- [FP010] Pharmacy - "Shine"
- [FP7011] Astrid - "What To Say"
- [FPS012/FP7012] Astrid - Hi-Fi Lo-Fi EP
- [FPS013/FP7013] Astrid - "It's True"
- [FPS014/FP7014] Astrid - "High In The Morning"
- [FPS015] Angelica - "Why Did You Let My Kitten Die?"
- [FPS016/FP7016] Astrid - "Redground"
- [FPS017/FP7017] Angelica - "Bring Back Her Head"
- [FP7018] Astrid - "Boy Or Girl"/"Sleighride"
- [FPS019] Aerial - Signal EP
- [FPS020/FP7020] Astrid - "Modes Of Transport"
- [FPS021/FP7021] Angelica - "Take Me I'm Your Disease"
- [FPS022] Aerial - Star Of The Show EP
- [FPS023/FP7023] Astrid - "Tick Tock"
- [FPS024/FP7024] Astrid - "Cherry Cherry"
- [FPS025] Astrid - "It Never Happened"
- [FPS026] Ikara Colt - "Sink Venice"
- [FPS027/FP7027] Ikara Colt - "One Note"
- [FPS028/FP7028] Buffseeds - "Casino"
- [FPS029/FP7029] Ikara Colt - "Rudd"
- [FPS030/FP7030] Buffseeds - "Barricade"
- [FPS031/FPS7031] Ikara Colt - Basic Instructions EP
- [FPCD032/FP7032] The Beatings - "Jailhouse"
- [FPS033/FPS7033] Buffseeds - "Who Stole The Weekend"
- [FPS034/FPS7034] The Beatings - "Bad Feeling"
- [FPS035/FPS7035] The Futureheads - 1-2-3-Nul! EP
- [FPS036/FP7036] The Futureheads - "First Day"
- [FPR001] Buffseeds - Sparkle Me EP
- [FPS037/FP7037] Buffseeds - "Sparkle Me"
- [FPS038/FPS038X/FP7038] Ikara Colt - "Wanna Be That Way"
- [FP7039] Ikara Colt - "Live At The Astoria"
- [FPS040/FPS040X/FP7040] Ikara Colt - "Wake In The City"
- [FPS041/FP7041] Help She Can't Swim - "Bunty vs Beano"
- [FPS042/FP7042/FP7042X] Ikara Colt - "Modern Feeling"
- [FPS043/FP7043/FP7043X] The Beat Up - "Messed Up"
- [FPS045/FP7045/FP7045X] The Beat Up - "Alright"
- [FPS046/FP7046] Help She Can't Swim - "I Don't Need You"
- [FP7047] The Sinking Citizenship - "Shake"
- [FP7048] William Campbell & Kevin MacNeil - "Local Man Ruins Everything"
- [FP7049] Kubichek! - Nightjoy
- [FPS050/FPTEN050] Guillemots - I Saw Such Things in My Sleep EP
- [FP7051] The Victorian English Gentlemens Club - "The Tales Of Hermit Mark"
- [FP7052] Umlaut - "Wintercoat"
- [FP7054] Help She Can't Swim - "Committing Social Suicide"
- [FPS055/FPTEN055] Guillemots - "Trains To Brazil"
- [FP7056] Kubichek! - "Taxi"
- [FPS057/FP7057] The Immediate - "Make Our Devils Flow"
- [FPS058/FP7058] The Victorian English Gentlemens Club - "Amateur Man"/"Ban The Gin"
- [FPS059/FP7059] Bearsuit - "Steven F***ing Spielberg"
- [FPS060/FP7060] Help She Can't Swim - "Midnight Garden"
- [FP7062] The Immediate - "Stop And Remember"
- [FP7063] The Victorian English Gentlemens Club - "Impossible Sightings Over Shelton"
- [FP7064] New Cassettes - "You Won't Stop"
- [FP7065] Chow Chow - Chow Chow Chow Chow Chow Chow Chow Chow Chow EP
- [FPSA066] Guillemots - "Of The Night EP"
- [FP7067] The Victorian English Gentlemens Club/You Say Party We Say Die - "Pedestrian/Apocalypse Meow"
- [FP7068] Fyfe Dangerfield & The Kittens - "Delusia"/"Happy Christmas from The Kittens"
- [FP7069] Help She Can't Swim - "Hospital Drama"
- [FP7070] Chow Chow - "Dear Francis"
- [FP7072] Bricolage - "Looting Takes the Waiting Out of Wanting"
- [FP7073] The Strange Death of Liberal England - "A Day Another Day"
- [FP7076] The Victorian English Gentlemens Club - "La Mer"/"Stupid As Wood"
- [FP7077] Bearsuit - "More Soul than Wigan Casino"
- [FP7078] The Strange Death of Liberal England - "Oh Solitude"
- [FP7080] Bearsuit - "Foxy Boxer"
- [FP7082] The Black Arts - "Christmas Number One"
- [FP7083] Oppenheimer - "Look Up"
- [FP7084] The Strange Death of Liberal England - "Angelou"
- [FPS085] I Like Trains - "The Christmas Tree Ship"
- [FPS086D] Bearsuit - "Pushover"
- [FPS087D] Bearsuit - "Muscle Belt"
- [FPS088] Race Horses - "Cake"
- [FP7089] Race Horses - "Man In My Mind EP"
- [FPS090D] Race Horses - "Glo Ac Oren"
- [FPS091D] Race Horses - "Pony"
- [FPS092D] Luke Haines - "Love Letter To London"
- [FPS093D] Race Horses - "Benidorm"

=== Albums and mini-albums ===
- [FPCD001/FPLP001] Astrid - Strange Weather Lately
- [FPCD002/FPLP002] Angelica - The End of a Beautiful Career
- [FPCD003/FPLP003] Astrid - Play Dead
- [FPCD004D] Aerial - Back Within Reach
- [FPCD005/FPLP005] Ikara Colt - Chat and Business
- [FPCD006/FPLP006] Buffseeds - The Picture Show
- [FPCD007] Ikara Colt - Chat and Business/Basic Instructions
- [FPCD008/FPLP008] The Beat Up - Black Rays Defence
- [FPCD009/FPLP009] Ikara Colt - Modern Apprentice
- [FPCD010/FPLP010] Help She Can't Swim - Fashionista Super Dance Troupe
- [FPCD011] Bearsuit - Team Ping Pong
- [FPCD014] The Immediate - In Towers And Clouds
- [FPCD015] Guillemots - From the Cliffs
- [FPCD016] The Victorian English Gentlemens Club - The Victorian English Gentlemens Club
- [FPCD017/FPLP017] Help She Can't Swim - The Death of Nightlife
- [FPCD018] Chow Chow - Colours and Lines
- [FPCD019] The Strange Death of Liberal England - Forward March!
- [FPCD020] Bearsuit - OH:IO
- [FPCD022] Oppenheimer - Oppenheimer
- [FPCD023] Oppenheimer - Take The Whole Mid-Range and Boost It
- [FPCD024] Race Horses - Goodbye Falkenberg
- [FPCD025] Luke Haines - 21st Century Man
- [FPCD030] Luke Haines - 9 1/2 Psychedelic Meditations On British Wrestling Of The 1970's and Early '80s
- [FPCD032] The North Sea Scrolls - The North Sea Scrolls
- [FPCD033] Luke Haines - Leeds United EP
- [FPCD034] Luke Haines - Off My Rocker At The Art School Bop

== See also ==
- List of record labels
- List of independent UK record labels
