= Scott Lyon =

Scott Lyon may refer to:

- Scott Lyon (curler) in 1990 European Curling Championships
- Scott Lyon (musician)
