= Iko (band) =

English rock band

- Origin: Exeter, Devon, England
- Genres: Rock, Alternative, Progressive
- Years active: 2005–2013
- Members: Darren Harvey-Regan; Rob Maxwell; Beth Porter; Kieran Scragg; Neil Reed
- Website: www.ikomusic.com

Iko were an English rock band from Exeter, Devon, England. Formed in 2005 the band consists of Kieran Scragg (lead vocals and guitar), Neil Reed (keyboards), Rob Maxwell (drums), Darren Harvey-Regan (bass guitar), and Beth Porter (cello).

Scragg and Reed had been members of the just disbanded indie-rock band Buffseeds signed to Fantastic Plastic Records.

In 2007 Iko signed a deal with the Danish record label Copenhagen Records which allowed them to tour the Scandinavian countries.

Iko released two studio albums: I Am Zero (2006), and Ludo Says Hi (2009).

== Discography ==
=== Albums ===
- 2006: I Am Zero
- 2009: Ludo Says Hi

=== EPs ===
- 2009: Ctrl Alt Delete
