= T in the Park 2004 =

Music festival in Scotland

T in the Park
- Dates: 10–11 July 2004
- Locations: Balado, Scotland
- Years active: 1994 - present
- Website: http://tinthepark.com/

The 2004 T in the Park were held on Saturday 10 July and Sunday 11 July 2004. It attracted approximately 60,000 people on both the Saturday and Sunday. The two biggest stages were the Main Stage and the NME Stage, along with four tents which included the Slam Tent and the King Tut's Tent.

Originally David Bowie was supposed to headline the main stage on the Saturday evening, but had to pull out due to illness. The Darkness were promoted to headline the main stage and played to a small crowd. Many music fans went to see Muse on the NME stage instead. The Strokes closed the festival, headlining the main stage on the Sunday night.

== Line up ==
The 2004 line-up was as follows:

=== Main Stage ===
Saturday 10 July	Sunday 11 July
The Darkness; The Charlatans; Starsailor; Faithless; Pink; The Black Eyed Peas; The Beta Band; Big Brovaz	The Strokes; Pixies; Kings of Leon; PJ Harvey; The Thrills; Franz Ferdinand; Scissor Sisters; Goldie Lookin' Chain

=== NME Stage ===
Saturday 10 July	Sunday 11 July
Muse; The Libertines; Wu-Tang Clan; Keane; Funeral for a Friend; British Sea Power; The Zutons; Dogs Die In Hot Cars; Kasabian	Massive Attack; N*E*R*D; Badly Drawn Boy; Goldfrapp; The Rapture; Stellastarr; The Killers; Razorlight; The Cribs

=== King Tut's Tent ===
Saturday 10 July	Sunday 11 July
Ocean Colour Scene; Ash; Katie Melua; Michael Franti and Spearhead; Speedway; The Ordinary Boys; The Glitterati; Blacklight; Mohair; Rodrigo Y Gabriela	Snow Patrol; Orbital; Electric Six; Mull Historical Society; Amy Winehouse; Tim Booth; Complete Stone Roses; Jerry Fish; Terra Diablo

=== X-Tent ===
Saturday 10 July	Sunday 11 July
The Bees; Delays; Ian McNabb; Ben Kweller; Rickie Warwick; Thea Gilmore; Jesse Malin; Republic of Loose; The Crimea; The Departure; Drug of the Nation	The Stands; Hope of the States; Sons and Daughters; 22-20s; Thirteen Senses; The Dead 60s; The Open; Nine Black Alps; The Golden Virgins; Polly Paulusma; Colour of Fire

=== Slam Tent ===
Saturday 10 July	Sunday 11 July
Basement Jaxx; Felix Da Housecat; Carl Craig; Tiga; Tiefschwarz; Mylo; Vector Lovers; Carlos Adolfo Dominguez (live); Jim Hutchinson and Smoke	The Chemical Brothers (live); Groove Armada (live); Jeff Mills; Josh Wink; Slam; Funk D Void (live); Adam Freeland; DJ Yoda; Sidewinder; Salon Boris

=== T Break Stage ===
Saturday 10 July	Sunday 11 July
Dead Fly Buchowki; Josephine; The Needles; Uncle John & Whitelock; Weird Attractors; Unkle Bob; Kain; Mother & The Addicts; Degrassi; Last Great Wilderness; The Casuals; Sporting Hero; Eric & The Bunny Boilers; Palomino	Poor Old Ben; Hiding Place; Eastern Lane; FB Collective; We Rock Like Girls Don't; Red Bee Society; James Orr Complex; Allergo; Certain Death; Cinematics; The Star 69; Ludovico
