= The Victorian English Gentlemens Club (album) =

Studio album by The Victorian English Gentlemens Club
- Released: 28 August 2006
- Genre: Indie rock, art punk, post-punk
- Length: 33:33
- Label: Fantastic Plastic Records
- Producer: Gareth Parton, Dan Swift

Professional ratings
Review scores
Source	Rating
Drowned in Sound	9/10
NME	7/10
Q	3/5 stars
Rolling Stone	3.5/5 stars
Uncut	4/5 stars

The Victorian English Gentlemens Club is the debut album by the Victorian English Gentlemens Club.

== Track listing ==
1. "The Tales of Hermit Mark" – 2:52
2. "Stupid as Wood" – 2:55
3. "My Son Spells Backwards" – 1:55
4. "Impossible Sightings Over Shelton" – 3:27
5. "Such a Chore" – 2:13
6. "Dead Anyway" – 3:27
7. "Ban the Gin" – 2:15
8. "Amateur Man" – 2:39
9. "A Hundred Years of the Street" – 2:13
10. "Under the Yews" – 2:34
11. "Cannonball" – 4:24
