= The Sinking Citizenship =

Australian rock band

- Origin: Melbourne, Victoria, Australia
- Genres: Indie rock, art rock, pop punk
- Years active: 2002–2007
- Label: Sweet Nothing Records (UK)
- Members: Kristian Roberts; John Forbes; Matt Cox
- Website: http://www.myspace.com/thesinkingcitizenship

The Sinking Citizenship were an Australian rock band, formed in 2002 in Melbourne.

== History ==
After forming in 2002 and playing the local scene in Melbourne, Australia, the band began in 2003 to gain an amount of attention, their self-released first EP (The Sinking Citizenship EP) debuting at number 2 in independent radio, with strong support from local and national radio stations (including Xfm London) leading to a sell-out launch. The band recorded their first album, Broadcasting Germs, in the second half of 2003, using mostly equipment 'borrowed' from others without their knowledge. The album was released in 2004 on UXB Recordings, and in April 2005 was released in the UK and much of Europe on Sweet Nothing Records, distributed by Cargo Records. In June, a limited edition (500 only) single, Shake was released in the UK on Fantastic Plastic Records. The band then recorded their second album, Delete then Repeat (partially written in London and Berlin), released in 2006 on UXB Records.

== Discography ==
=== Albums ===
- Broadcasting Germs (2004)
- Delete then Repeat (2006)

=== Singles ===
- "Shake" (2005)

=== EPs ===
- The Sinking Citizenship EP (2003)

=== Compilation appearances ===
- Make Mixtapes Not War – Unstable Ape compilation (2003)
