= Andrew Mueller =

Australian journalist

Andrew Mueller is an Australian-born, London-based journalist and author. He is a contributing editor at Monocle, and also regularly writes for The Independent, The Independent on Sunday, The Financial Times, Esquire, The Guardian, Arena, The Times, Uncut, High Life, Harper's Bazaar, New Humanist, The Quietus, eMusic, and openDemocracy.net. He is the author of Rock & Hard Places, I Wouldn't Start From Here, It's Too Late To Die Young Now, and was a contributing editor to the fifth edition of Robert Young Pelton's The World's Most Dangerous Places. He was Reviews Editor for Melody Maker 1991 to 1993.

In 2005, whilst researching a book on "unrecognised states", he was detained by Cameroonian paramilitary gendarmes along with members of an Anglophone separatist group. He was released after intervention from the Australian consulate and the Committee to Protect Journalists.

Andrew Mueller was quoted in Richard Dawkins' book, The God Delusion:

The journalist Andrew Mueller is of the opinion that pledging yourself to any particular religion 'is no more or less weird than choosing to believe that the world is rhombus-shaped, and borne through the cosmos in the pincers of two enormous green lobsters called Esmerelda and Keith.'

He is also the frontman of UK-based alt-country band The Blazing Zoos, whose debut album, "I'll Leave Quietly", was released in 2010.

He is a patron of Humanists UK.

== Collaborations ==
- The North Sea Scrolls (with Luke Haines and Cathal Coughlan) — 2012

== Publications ==
- I Wouldn't Start From Here: The 21st Century And Where It All Went Wrong (2008)
- Rock & Hard Places: Travels to Backstages, Frontlines and Assorted Sideshows (2012)
- It's Too Late To Die Young Now: Misadventures in Rock And Roll (2014)
- Carn: The Game, and the Country that Plays it (2019)
