= Play Dead (Astrid album) =

Studio album by Astrid
- Released: 2001
- Genre: Indie pop, pop rock
- Length: 46:09
- Label: Fantastic Plastic Records
- Producer: Tony Doogan

Astrid chronology
Strange Weather Lately (1999)	Play Dead (2001)	One in Four (2004)

Play Dead is the second album by Scottish guitar-pop fourpiece Astrid.

== Track listing ==
1. "It Never Happened" – 2:27
2. "Tick Tock" – 3:17
3. "Wrong for You" – 3:36
4. "Crying Boy" – 2:57
5. "Alas" – 3:12
6. "Play Dead" – 2:44
7. "Fat Girl" – 2:37
8. "Just One Name" – 4:21
9. "Hard to Be a Person" – 2:18
10. "Paper" – 3:12
11. "Modes of Transport" – 3:05
12. "What You're Thinking" – 2:21
13. "Taken for Granted" – 3:16
14. "Horror Movies" + "We'll Drive Away" (hidden track) – 6:46
