= Cat Spectacular! =

Studio album by Bearsuit
- Released: May 2004 (Europe); March 2005 (North America)
- Recorded: Sickroom Studios
- Genre: Indie pop
- Length: 29:04
- Label: Fortuna Pop! FPOP53
- Producer: Owen Turner

Bearsuit chronology
| Cat Spectacular! (2004) | Team Ping Pong (2005) |

Professional ratings
Review scores
| Source | Rating |
|---|---|
| Pitchfork Media | (7.5/10) |

Cat Spectacular! is the debut studio album by indie pop band Bearsuit. It was released in 2004 on Fortuna Pop!.

== Track listing ==
1. "Welcome Bearsuit Space hotel" – 2:04
2. "Cookie Oh Jesus" – 2:57
3. "Rodent Disco" – 2:08
4. "Cherryade" – 2:57
5. "I Feel the Heat of the Light from Heaven" – 0:48
6. "Going Steady" – 2:30
7. "Itsuko Got Married" – 2:32
8. "Prove Katie Wrong" – 3:04
9. "TSTM" – 3:11
10. "Diagonal Girl" – 1:26
11. "Kiki Keep Me Company" – 2:00
12. "On Your Special Day" – 3:22
