= Forward March! =

Album by The Strange Death of Liberal England

Studio album by The Strange Death of Liberal England
- Released: 2007
- Recorded: Chapel Studios, Lincolnshire
- Genre: Indie rock
- Length: 31:33
- Label: Fantastic Plastic
- Producer: Rob Kirwan

The Strange Death of Liberal England chronology
Forward March! (2007)	Drown Your Heart Again (2010)

Singles from Forward March
- 1. "A Day Another Day" Released: 2 April 2007; 2. "Oh Solitude" Released: 24 June 2007

Forward March! is the debut mini-album by Portsmouth-based British band, The Strange Death of Liberal England. It was released by Fantastic Plastic in 2007.

Professional ratings
Review scores
Source	Rating
Drowned in Sound	7/10
Gigwise	4.5/5 stars
The Guardian	3/5 stars
NME	7/10

== Track listing ==
1. "Modern Folk Song" – 4:23
2. "Oh Solitude" – 2:48
3. "A Day Another Day" – 4:12
4. "An Old Fashioned War" – 2:50
5. "Mozart on 33" – 3:15
6. "I Saw Evil" – 4:47
7. "God Damn Broke and Broken Hearted" – 3:36
8. "Summer Gave us Sweets but Autumn Wrought Division" – 5:29
