= The Death of Nightlife =

Studio album by Help She Can't Swim
- Released: May 2007
- Recorded: 2006/2007, England
- Genre: Indie rock, dance-punk
- Label: Fantastic Plastic

Help She Can't Swim chronology
Committing Social Suicide (2005)	The Death of Nightlife (2007)

Professional ratings
Review scores
Source	Rating
This Is Fake DIY	3.5/5 stars

The Death of Nightlife is the second album by British indie/art rock band Help She Can't Swim, released in May 2007 on Fantastic Plastic Records. The album is available on 12" vinyl, CD and download formats. The vinyl album includes an extra track, "Why Don't We Just Hurt Ourselves", which is placed between "All the Stars" and "Just Be Social". The CD version came with a bonus disc containing the four track Committing Social Suicide EP, previously unavailable on CD.

== Track listing ==
1. "Pass the Hat Around" – 3:36
2. "Idle Chatter" – 2:47
3. "Kite Eating Tree" – 1:54
4. "Hospital Drama" – 3:09
5. "Apes and Pigs at the Vulture Coliseum" – 3:14
6. "I Think the Record's Stopped" – 2:53
7. "Midnight Garden" – 2:26
8. "Box of Delights" – 2:42
9. "All the Stars" – 3:08
10. "Why Don't We Just Hurt Ourselves" (vinyl only)
11. "Just Be Social" – 2:49
12. "Dragged Under A Wave" – 2:16
13. "Never the Right Time for Us" – 4:26

== Personnel ==
- Tom Denney – vocals, guitar, keyboard
- Leesey Frances – keyboard, vocals
- Tom Baker – bass guitar, keyboard
- Lewis Baker – drums
