= Fashionista Super Dance Troupe =

Studio album by Help She Can't Swim
- Released: December 2004
- Recorded: England
- Genre: Indie rock
- Label: Fantastic Plastic

Help She Can't Swim chronology
Fashionista Super Dance Troupe (2004)	Committing Social Suicide (2007)

Professional ratings
Review scores
Source	Rating
Drowned in Sound	8/10 stars
Visions	6/12
Sound of Violence	4/5

Fashionista Super Dance Troupe is the first album by the indie/art rock band Help She Can't Swim, released on Fantastic Plastic Records in 2004.

== Track listing ==
1. "Fermez La Bouche" – 1:38
2. "I Don't Need You" – 1:51
3. "Bunty vs Beano" – 2:10
4. "My Own Private Disco" – 2:34
5. "Sensitive Youth" – 1:54
6. "What Would Morrissey Say?" – 2:13
7. "Yr the One" – 1:55
8. "Are You Feeling Fashionable?" – 2:45
9. "Boy Toy" – 2:04
10. "The Dance Party Turned Into A Wake" – 1:56
11. "Apples" – 3:56

The Japanese release had two bonus tracks.

1. Drew Barrymore Movie Marathon
2. Bra Burning For Kicks

== Personnel ==
- Tom Denney – vocals, guitar, keyboard
- Leesey Frances – keyboard, vocals
- Tom Baker – bass guitar, keyboard
- Lewis Baker – drums
