= Bearsuit =

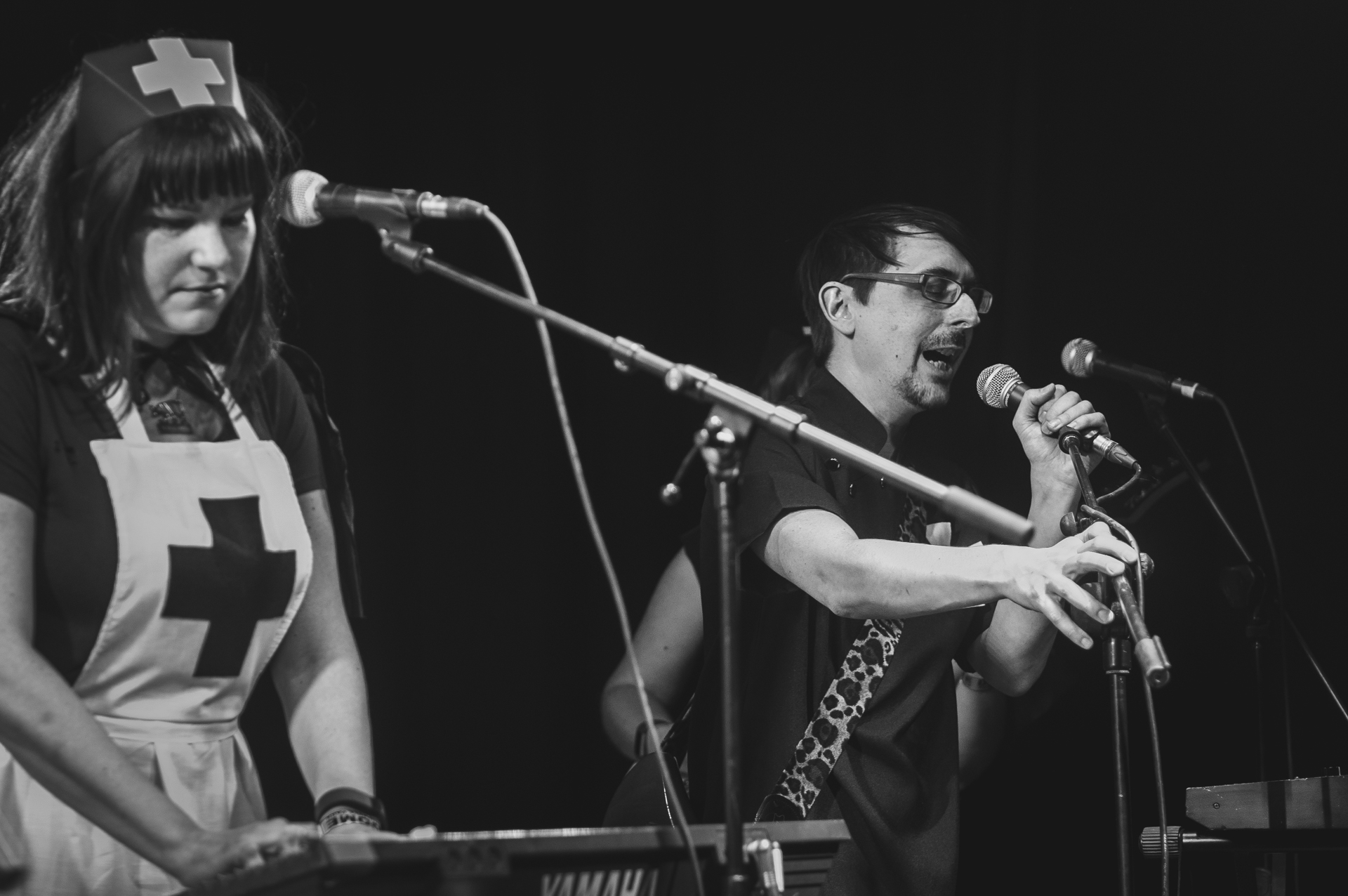
- Bearsuit performing at Fortuna Pop, March 2017

Background information
- Origin: Norwich, England
- Genres: Art rock; indie pop; dance-rock
- Years active: 2001-2012, 2016-2017
- Labels: Fortuna Pop!, Fantastic Plastic
- Past members: Lisa Horton; Jan Robertson; Iain Ross; Emma Belka; Cerian Hutchings; Matt Hutchings; Matt Moss; Richard Squires
- Website: bearsuit.co.uk

Bearsuit are an English art-rock/indie pop band from Norwich, England, active from 2001.

== Biography ==
Bearsuit first came to public attention following their championing by BBC Radio 1 DJ John Peel, and their debut single "Hey Charlie, Hey Chuck" was voted number four in the Peel programme's Festive Fifty of 2001. They recorded four Peel Sessions in 2001 and 2002 and their single "Chargr" was number two in the first Festive Fifty after Peel's death.

After their third album, oh:io, in 2007, the band underwent a line-up change, swapped violins, flutes and horns for synths and guitars, brought in producer Gareth Parton (the Go! Team, Foals, the Breeders) and recorded the more pop-oriented album The Phantom Forest (released in 2011).

First single from the album "Please Don't Take Him Back" was released in October 2010 on the UK label Fortuna Pop!; it was playlisted on BBC6 Music, received airplay on Radio 1 and XFM, and was reviewed in NME, Vice, Artrocker, Clash Magazine, and many more online. A free download single, "A Train Wreck", was released in December 2010 followed by "When Will I Be Queen" in March 2011. The band toured the UK in March and April, followed by a European Tour in July 2011.

As well as touring extensively in the UK, the band toured the US, playing festivals including Latitude, Bestival, The Great Escape and Offset, as well as several abroad including SXSW, Emmaboda (Sweden), Primavera Sound (Spain), Contempopranea (Spain) and CMJ in New York, where they were voted 'Best Breakthrough Act' in a New York Times poll of badge-holders and received positive reviews, including Pitchfork.

The band also supported the likes of Crystal Castles, Melt Banana, You Say Party, Future of the Left, Factory Floor and Hot Chip. In addition to Fantastic Plastic Records and Fortuna Pop, the band released records on Happy Happy Birthday to Me and Micro Indie in the US.

Bearsuit were championed by BBC radio DJs including John Peel, Steve Lamacq, Huw Stephens, Zane Lowe, Rob Da Bank, Phill Jupitus, Marc Riley, Tom Ravenscroft, Tom Robinson, Colin Murray, Gideon Coe and John Kennedy on XFM. Accolades include scooping "Vinyl of the Week" in the NME, "Pick of the Week" in The Guardian, and 'Album of the Fortnight' in Artrocker.

Members have also played in the Polyphonic Spree, Cruiser Chimps, Evader, Keytarded, Hyper Kinako, The Bavarian Rocket Group, Velvia, Tell Me How, the Aprons, Mega Emotion, Lady Di, P0VT3R and Invisible Cities.

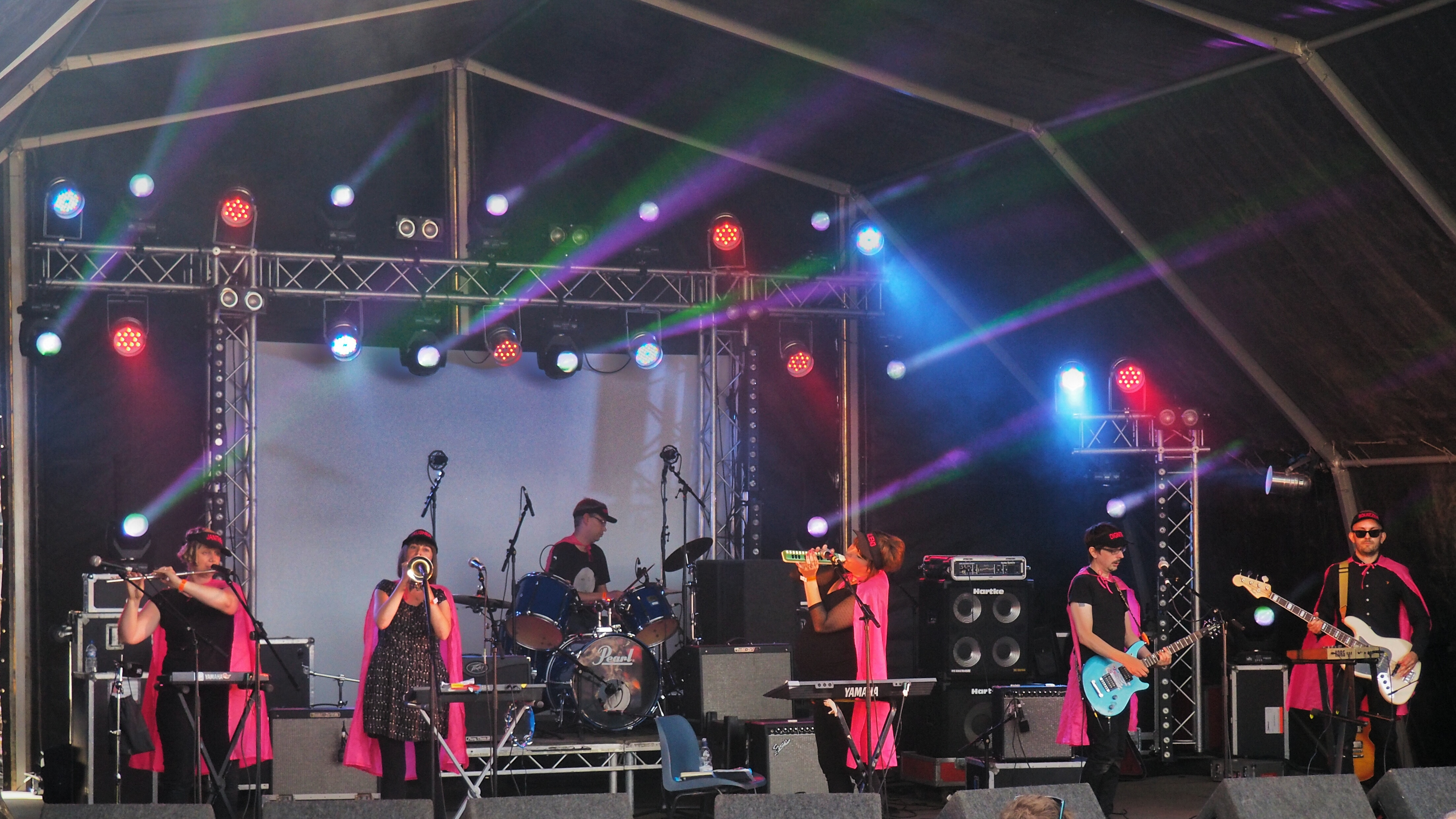
In 2016

Following a hiatus from 2012, Bearsuit reformed to play at Indietracks festival in 2016, and one of Fortuna POP's 'Twenty Years Of Trouble' farewell concerts in 2017.

== Band members ==
- Lisa Horton — keyboards, vocals, accordion
- Jan Robertson — guitar, keyboards, vocals, flute
- Iain Ross — guitar, vocals
- Emma Belka - drums (until 2001)
- Cerian Hutchings (née Hamer) — cornet, violin, keyboards, vocals, piano, percussion
- Matt Hutchings — drums
- Matt Moss — bass (until 2004) (also a member of Lethargic Pigeon and The Rebeccas)
- Richard Squires — bass, guitar, vocals
- Charlene Katuwawala — bass guitar, vocals, keyboards
- Joe Naylor — drums, vocals

== Discography ==
=== Albums ===
- Cat Spectacular! (Fortuna Pop!, Microindie 2004)
- Team Ping Pong (Fantastic Plastic, 2005)
- oh:io (Fantastic Plastic, Happy Happy Birthday To Me Records 2007)
- The Phantom Forest (Fortuna Pop!, 2011)

=== Singles ===
- "Hey Charlie Hey Chuck" (Sickroom GC, 2001)
- "Drinkink" (Sickroom GC, 2002)
- "Stop What You're Doing What You're Doing Is Wrong" (Sickroom GC, 2002)
- "Itsuko Got Married" (Bearslut recordings, 2003)
- "The Bearsuit Jesus Will Spear You Through The Heart" EP (Fortuna Pop!, 2003)
- "Chargr!" (Fortuna POP!, 2004)
- "Steven Fucking Spielberg" (Fantastic Plastic, 2006)
- "More Soul Than Wigan Casino" (Fantastic Plastic, 2007) No. 24 UK Indie
- "Foxy Boxer" (Fantastic Plastic, 2007) No. 13 UK Indie
- "Pushover" (Fantastic Plastic, 2008)
- "Musclebelt" (Fantastic Plastic, 2009)
- "Please Don't Take Him Back" (Fortuna POP!, 2010)
- "A Train Wreck" (free digital download to mailing list, Fortuna Pop!, 2010)
- "When Will I Be Queen" (Fortuna Pop!, 2011)

=== Compilation appearances ===
- The Gazumper (Sickroom GC, 2001)
- "Snowshoe" on Should you be singing Christmas songs? (Happy Capitalist, 2001)
- "Come Around" on GoJonnyGoGoGoGo (2001)
- "Drinkink" on Blip Anomaly (Sickroom GC, 2001)
- "Poor Prince Neal" on GoJonnyGoGoGoGo2 (2002)
- "Little Donkey" on A Christmas Gift from Fortuna Pop! (Fortuna POP!, 2002)
- "On Your Special Day" on I'm With Cupid (WIAIWYA records, 2004)
- "Rodent Disco" on GoJonnyGoGoGoGo Favourites No. 1 (2005)
- "Rodent Disco" (edited version) on Que Viva le Pop! (Elefant Records/Fortuna POP!, 2006)
- "Itsuko Got Married" on Kat's Karavan: The History of John Peel on the Radio (Universal Music, 2009)
