= Chat and Business =

Studio album by Ikara Colt
- Released: March 2002
- Recorded: England
- Genre: Alternative rock
- Label: Fantastic Plastic

Ikara Colt chronology
Chat and Business (2002)	Basic Instructions (2002)

Professional ratings
Review scores
Source	Rating
Pitchfork	7.1/10
Portland Mercury	4/4 stars

Chat and Business is the debut album from British post-punk/art rock band Ikara Colt. It was released on Fantastic Plastic Records on 4 March 2002 (released in Europe and the USA on Epitaph Records, and in Japan by Maximum 10 Records. The record was disqualified from the UK album charts as accompanying stickers, which the purchaser was to match with the captions below spaces on the cover of the album, were deemed to be a free gift.

== Critical reception ==
PopMatters called the album "speedy, volatile, spittle- dripping, and, above all, filled with an energy unique to frustrated and bored college students." Trouser Press dismissed it as "art-rock by the numbers."

== Track listing ==
1. One Note - (2:18)
2. Rudd - (2:59)
3. Bishop's Son - (2:59)
4. City of Glass - (4:03)
5. Pop Group - (1:53)
6. Belgravia - (3:03)
7. Sink Venice - (2:44)
8. After This - (3:08)
9. At the Lodge - (3:50)
10. Here We Go Again - (2:58)
11. May B 1 Day - (4:33)
12. Video Clip Show - (10:25)
13. Memory (Japanese bonus)
14. Your Vain Attempts (Japanese bonus)
15. Escalate (Hidden Track / Japanese bonus)

A hidden track 'Escalate' is included after Video Clip Show, it starts on 8:37. This track was a live favourite, and is a re-recording of the Sink Venice b-side. the album was purposely made to run at 45 minutes long, the length of 1 side of a c90. All songwriting credits on the album are given to Ikara Colt

The European pressing is a double cd, CD2 features the Basic Instructions EP tracks:

1. bring it to me
2. may b 1 day #2
3. don't they know
4. panic
