= Drown Your Heart Again =

Studio album by The Strange Death of Liberal England
- Released: 2010
- Recorded: Old Blacksmiths Studio, Portsmouth
- Genre: Indie rock
- Label: Republic of Music
- Producer: David M. Allen

The Strange Death of Liberal England chronology
| Forward March! (2007) | Drown Your Heart Again (2010) |

Drown Your Heart Again is the first full-length album by British indie rock band The Strange Death of Liberal England. It was released in September 2010 on the Republic of Music label.

The album is not a concept album, but features a number of sea-related themes.

== Critical reception ==
Upon its release, many reviewers commented on the length of time it had taken for this album to arrive, five years since the band first came to prominence, and three since the release of Forward March!, their previous mini-album.

[Sic] Magazine said "Their music is joyful and optimistic, blending folk-driven indie rock with the choral stomp of post-orchestral", comparing them to British Sea Power, I Like Trains and Efterklang.

Dom Gourlay's review in Drowned in Sound said that "the ten pieces that make up Drown Your Heart Again represent a composed transition for a band unfairly forgotten in an ever-changing cyclical musical landscape", rating it 7/10.

== Track listing ==
From the sleeve notes, back cover and Discogs.

1. "Flickering Light"
2. "Flagships"
3. "Rising Sea"
4. "Like a Curtain Falling"
5. "Lighthouse"
6. "Autumn"
7. "Shadows"
8. "Come On You Young Philosophers!"
9. "Yellow Flowers"
10. "Dog Barking at the Moon"
