= The Art of Pretending to Swim =

Studio album by Villagers
- Released: 21 September 2018
- Genre: Indie pop; indie folk
- Length: 41:21
- Label: Domino

Villagers chronology
| Where Have You Been All My Life? (2016) | The Art of Pretending to Swim (2018) | Fever Dreams (2021) |

Singles from The Art of Pretending to Swim
- 1. "A Trick of the Light" Released: 12 June 2018; 2. "Fool" Released: 20 August 2018

The Art of Pretending to Swim is the fourth studio album by Irish band Villagers. It was released on 21 September 2018 under Domino Recording Company.

== Release ==
On 12 June 2018, the band announced the release of their new album, along with the single "A Trick Of The Light".

The second single "Fool" was released on 20 August 2018.

The third single "Again" was released on 10 September 2018.

== Critical reception ==
Professional ratings
Aggregate scores
| Source | Rating |
|---|---|
| Metacritic | 77/100 |
Review scores
| Source | Rating |
| AllMusic | 3.5/5 stars |
| Clash | 8/10 |
| DIY | 4/5 stars |
| Drowned in Sound | 8/10 |
| Exclaim! | 5/10 |
| The Line of Best Fit | 8/10 |
| Loud and Quiet | 6/10 |
| MusicOMH | 4/5 stars |
| NME | 4/5 stars |

The Art of Pretending to Swim was met with "generally favorable" reviews from critics. At Metacritic, which assigns a weighted average rating out of 100 to reviews from mainstream publications, this release received an average score of 77, based on 15 reviews. Aggregator Album of the Year gave the release a 75 out of 100 based on a critical consensus of 15 reviews.

Mark Deming from AllMusic wrote about the album: "This music feels warmer and more naturalistic than his earlier experiments with one-man recording, and there's a gentle swing in the rhythms that suggests he's been listening to some smooth R&B lately. [The album] is a strong example of how one man with an unlimited number of tracks to fill can create a compelling and revealing collection of songs.

=== Accolades ===
| Publication | Accolade | Rank | Ref. |
|---|---|---|---|
| Rough Trade | Top 100 Albums of 2018 | 95 | |

== Track listing ==
| No. | Title | Length |
|---|---|---|
| 1. | "Again" | 4:28 |
| 2. | "A Trick of the Light" | 4:08 |
| 3. | "Sweet Saviour" | 4:36 |
| 4. | "Long Time Waiting" | 5:09 |
| 5. | "Fool" | 3:18 |
| 6. | "Love Came With All That It Brings" | 5:29 |
| 7. | "Real Go-Getter" | 3:25 |
| 8. | "Hold Me Down" | 4:38 |
| 9. | "Ada" | 6:10 |

== Charts ==
| Chart (2018) | Peak position |
|---|---|
| Austrian Albums (Ö3 Austria) | 64 |
| Belgian Albums (Ultratop Flanders) | 31 |
| Belgian Albums (Ultratop Wallonia) | 116 |
| Dutch Albums (Album Top 100) | 76 |
| French Albums (SNEP) | 175 |
| German Albums (Offizielle Top 100) | 55 |
| Irish Albums (OCC) | 2 |
| Scottish Albums (OCC) | 21 |
| Swiss Albums (Schweizer Hitparade) | 48 |
| UK Albums (OCC) | 28 |
| UK Independent Albums (OCC) | 4 |

== Personnel ==
Musicians

- Conor J. O'Brien – vocals
- Cormac Curran – keyboard
- Kate Ellis – cello
- Cormac Ó Haodáin – French horn
- Deirdre O'Leary – clarinet
- Maaike Van Der Linde – flute
- Alan Darcy – sax
- Colm O'Hara – trombone
- Kevin Kelleher – trumpet
- Lisa Dowdall – viola
- Larissa O'Grady – violin
- Siobhán Kane – backing vocals

'Production

- Gavin Glass – engineer
- Peter Ashmore – engineer
