= Upbeat Love =

Studio album by Threatmantics
- Released: 3 November 2008
- Genre: Alternative rock
- Label: Double Six (Domino)

Professional ratings
Review scores
Source	Rating
Contactmusic.com	link
Rocklouder.co.uk	link

Upbeat Love is the debut album by the band Threatmantics. It was released on 3 November 2008 by Domino Records imprint Double Six Records.

== Track listing ==
1. "Big Man"
2. "Buried Alive"
3. "Don't Care"
4. "Get Outta Town"
5. "High Waister"
6. "James Lemain"
7. "Little Bird"
8. "Lonely Heart"
