= New Cassettes =

English indie rock band

- Origin: Northampton, England
- Genres: Indie rock, post-punk revival, alternative dance, alternative rock
- Years active: 2005–present
- Members: Tom Stubbs - Vocals Nikolas Gray - Guitar/Vocals Dan Battison - Bass Owen Reed - Guitar/Vocals Tommy Francis- Drums/Vocals
- Website: http://www.newcassettes.com

New Cassettes were an English five piece indie rock band from Northampton, England, formed in 2005.

== History ==
New Cassettes were a five-piece band formed in 2005. The band's debut album 'The Art of...' was released in 2009, with second album Winterhead, following in March 2012 through N13/MTV. They gained critical acclaim from plays on Radio 1, BBC6 and XFM, and have been MySpace and Radio 1 featured artists. The band toured in support of The Strokes, played Glastonbury Festival, and have been featured on The Inbetweeners Soundtrack along with a headlining tour in Japan.

=== Beginnings ===
The band released their debut single, "You Won't Stop" on Fantastic Plastic-with copies selling out within the first month and landing number at No. 11 in the indie charts in England. Their first single, "You Won't Stop" was issued on Fantastic Plastic, the follow-up, "Recover/Retreat" released on Maps' Last Space Recordings label. Third single 'Hearts Don't Beat Right', was released in 2008.

Two songs ("Carnivals" and "You Won't Stop"), were featured on the Channel 4 comedy, The Inbetweeners. Their debut album The Art Of... was released in 2009 in the UK on New Label, New Danger and in Japan under the Pony Up imprint.

New Cassettes finished the final mixing of their second album, Winterhead, with Grammy Award-winning songwriter and producer Adam Schlesinger of Fountains of Wayne and sound engineer Geoff Sanoff in October 2010. While in the States working on the album the band took a break from the studio to do a special ASCAP-hosted showcase for TV and movie executives at the Gibson Showroom in Los Angeles. The show was a success. MTV became fans of the New Cassettes after their short stop in Los Angeles, and asked them to join the new 'HYPE' venture between MTV and Extreme Music.

=== Members ===
- Tom Stubbs - vocals
- Nikolas Gray - guitar & vocals
- Owen Reed - guitar & vocals
- Dan Battison - bass & vocals

=== Former members ===
- Tommy Francis - Drums
- Ed Hoare - Drums

== Discography ==
=== Studio albums ===
- The Art Of... (June 2010)
- Winterhead (March 2012)

=== EPs ===
- Ep1]] (April 2012)
- Ep2 (August 2012)

=== Singles ===
- "You Wont Stop" / "Yeah" (August 2007)
- "Recover/Retreat" / "I'm Always Right" (March 2008)
- "Hearts Don't Beat Right" (September 2008)
- "Silent Guns" (May 2011)
- "Bite Your Lip" (October 2012)

=== Music videos ===
Year	Song	Album	Director(s)
2008	"Recover/Retreat"	The Art Of...	John Lumgair, Quirky Motion

=== Films ===
Year	Series	Episodes	Director(s)
2007	"BBC Electric Prom'"	1-5	Simeon Lumgair, John Lumgair, Colin Munro, Quirky Motion
