= Strange Weather Lately (album) =

Studio album by Astrid
- Released: 1999
- Genre: Indie pop, pop rock
- Label: Fantastic Plastic
- Producer: Edwyn Collins

Astrid chronology
Strange Weather Lately (1999)	Play Dead (2002)

Strange Weather Lately is the first album by Scottish guitar-pop fourpiece Astrid. The title originated from the comics and graphic novel series Strange Weather Lately (1996–1999) by the creative duo Metaphrog, a.k.a. Sandra Marrs and John Chalmers.

== Critical reception ==
Professional ratings
Review scores
Source	Rating
AllMusic	4.5/5 stars
NME	3/5 stars

The Independent likened the album to "the Undertones covering the Byrds."

== Track listing ==
1. "Kitchen T.V." – 2:39
2. "Plastic Skull" – 2:49
3. "High in the Morning" – 2:39
4. "Zoo" – 2:29
5. "Standing in Line" – 3:07
6. "Bottle" – 2:31
7. "Redground" – 3:15
8. "Like a Baby" – 1:58
9. "Stop" – 3:33
10. "Dusty" – 2:53
11. "Boat Song" – 2:21
12. "Boy or Girl" – 1:56
13. "W.O.P.R.M." – 4:52
