= Darling Arithmetic =

Studio album by Villagers
- Released: April 10, 2015
- Genre: Indie folk
- Length: 36:10
- Label: Domino
- Producer: Conor O'Brien

Villagers chronology
| {Awayland} (2013) | Darling Arithmetic (2015) | Where Have You Been All My Life? (2016) |

Professional ratings
Aggregate scores
| Source | Rating |
|---|---|
| Metacritic | 76/100 |
Review scores
| Source | Rating |
| Paste | 8.2/10 stars |
| The New York Times | favorable |
| Drowned In Sound | 8/10 stars |
| PopMatters | 8/10 stars |
| Pitchfork | (7.0/10) |
| The Last Mixed Tape | 10/10 stars |
| The Irish Times | 5/5 stars |
| The Line of Best Fit | 8.5/10 stars |
| The Guardian | 2/5 stars |

Darling Arithmetic is the third studio album from the twice Mercury Prize-nominated Irish indie folk band Villagers, released on April 10, 2015, via Domino Records. The album reached number one in the Irish album charts in its first week of release. It won the Best Album Award in the 2016 Ivor Novello Awards.

== Recording and release ==
The album was written, recorded, produced and mixed by songwriter Conor O'Brien at his home in Malahide, Dublin as a follow-up to Villagers' Mercury Prize nominated sophomore album {Awayland}.

The first song taken from the album 'Courage' was released on February 2, 2015, with an accompanying music video. This was followed by a second music video for the track 'Everything I Am Is Yours' on April 2.

Darling Arithmetic was eventually released on April 10 via Domino Records and reached number one on its first week of release in O'Brien's native Ireland and number 27 in the UK album charts.

== Critical response ==
The album was received positively by music critics, and currently holds a score of 76 on review aggregator website Metacritic. The album was cited by some reviewers as a departure from the sound of Villagers previous albums, with Pitchfork Media remarking "Darling Arithmetic, by contrast, is a radically subdued affair—nine mostly acoustic-based tracks that O’Brien recorded at home alone, playing every instrument and mixing the record on his own." Music critic with the New York Times, Nate Chinen also remarked on the change in sound stating "For the third Villagers album, “Darling Arithmetic,” Mr. O’Brien has scaled back radically, turning out something that resembles an old-fashioned folk-rock confessional."

Darling Arithmetic was also heralded in O'Brien's home country of Ireland with Tony Clayton-Lea of the Irish Times remarking that the album "proves that O’Brien – stripped back and wilfully solo – is just as potent and pure." The L.P. was also made "Album of the Week' on Nialler9 who said " Darling Arithmetic is the opposite of the Villagers’ second album {Awayland}. Where that album had Conor O’Brien adorning his powerful songwriting with increased sonics and a process which included not just O’Brien but the long-standing members of his band." While music critic Stephen White of the Last Mixed Tape called it "a deeply personal record that connects in a real and unmistakable way".

Not all reviews of the album were positive however, music reviewer Kate Hutchinson of the Guardian stated the record "never manages to be magical" and "never quite matches those artists’ emotional potency".

== Track listing ==
| No. | Title | Length |
|---|---|---|
| 1. | "Courage" | 4:47 |
| 2. | "Everything I Am Is Yours" | 3:30 |
| 3. | "Dawning On Me" | 3:19 |
| 4. | "Hot Scary Summer" | 4:20 |
| 5. | "The Soul Serene" | 4:10 |
| 6. | "Darling Arithmetic" | 3:42 |
| 7. | "Little Bigot" | 3:49 |
| 8. | "No One To Blame" | 3:35 |
| 9. | "So Naïve" | 4:58 |

== Personnel ==
=== Villagers ===
- Conor O'Brien – Composer and primary musician

=== Technical personnel ===
- Conor O'Brien – Producer, Mixer & Engineer
- Guy Davie - Mastering
