= The Jacques =

English Band

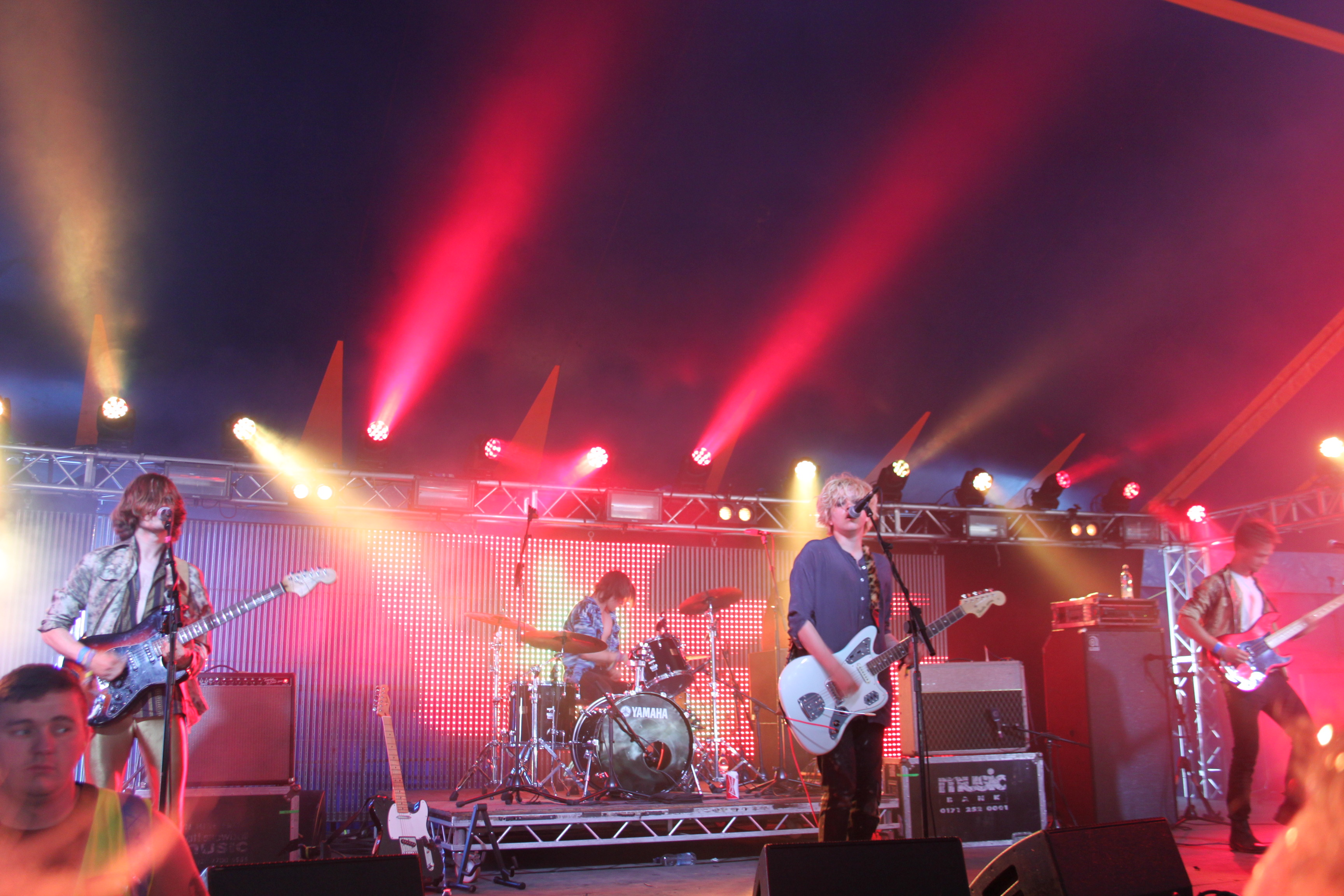
- The Jacques playing William's Green stage at Glastonbury Festival June 2015

Background information
- Origin: Bristol, England
- Genres: Indie rock, Britpop, grunge, post-punk, new wave
- Years active: 2014–present
- Label: Modern Sky UK
- Members: Finn O'Brien; Elliot O'Brien; Harry Thomas; Dexter Dougan
- Past members: Jake Edwards; Oliver Edwards; Clint Trembath; Will J. Hicks; James Lay

The Jacques are a band from the Bristol area and London.

The band was formed in early 2014, played at the Dot to Dot Festival and GuilFest and then shared a bill with The Libertines at Hyde Park. They were briefly signed The Libertines drummer Gary Powell with his 25 Hour Convenience Store label. The band subsequently released music independently before singing with Modern Sky UK in 2019.

They released their first four track EP, "Pretty DJ" in November 2014. It gained airplay on 6 Music by Huey Morgan and subsequently on Radio 2. In 2015 they recorded the track Painkiller for BBC Introducing in the West.
