= The Strange Death of Liberal England (band) =

- Playing live at the Summer Sundae festival, 2007

Background information
- Origin: Portsmouth, England
- Genres: Indie rock, post-rock
- Years active: 2005–2011
- Label: Fantastic Plastic
- Members: Adam Woolway; Andrew Wright; David Lindsay; William Charlton; Kelly Jones
- Website: strangedeath.co.uk

The Strange Death of Liberal England, also known as TSDOLE, were a five-piece English band from Portsmouth, England.

The band took its unusual name from George Dangerfield's 1935 book of the same name, about the early 20th century decline of the Liberal Party.

== History ==
Forming in 2005 the five-piece band began life with mainly instrumental songs; however, as they grew as a band lyrics began to appear in their songs.

As well as a self-produced and distributed EP, Stop/Go Happy/Sad Forward/Forward (2005), The Strange Death of Liberal England have released two singles and one "mini-album". The first single titled "A Day Another Day" was released by Fantastic Plastic early in 2007, with "Oh Solitude" following in June 2007. The band released their first "mini-album" called Forward March! on 9 July 2007.

The Strange Death of Liberal England released their first full-length album, Drown Your Heart Again, in September 2010. The album was preceded by a single, "Rising Sea" in August 2010.

== Members ==
- William Charlton – Guitar, Drums, Backing Vocals
- Kelly Jones – Bass, Backing Vocals
- Andrew Summerly – Drums, Backing Vocals (Summerly left in early 2010 and was replaced on drums by David Lindsay)
- Adam Woolway – Guitar, Main Vocals
- Andrew Wright – Glockenspiel, Percussion, Backing vocals

== Live ==
The Strange Death of Liberal England played many gigs throughout the UK and Europe, notably Latitude Festival 2007, and a live Maida Vale studio set for Steve Lamacq. The band also supported Manic Street Preachers during their 2007 tour.

Whilst the band did not play many dates in 2008 they played gigs in Germany with Mother Tongue & The Animal Five, in Spain at Primavera Sound (Barcelona) and gigs in England at The Freebutt, The Water Rats and at The Offset Festival. The band returned to the stage in April 2009 at The New Theatre Royal Portsmouth and played dates with Editors on their March 2010 tour.

The band played at the Beautiful Days Festival 2011 in Devon.

== Discography ==
=== Albums ===
- Forward March! (2007)
- Drown Your Heart Again (2010)

=== EPs ===
- Stop/Go Happy/Sad Forward/Forward (2005)

=== Singles ===
- "A Day Another Day" (2007)
- "Oh Solitude" (2007)
- "Angelou" (2008) Limited to 500 copies.
- "Rising Sea" (2010)
