= Pumarosa =

Electronic rock band based in North London, England

- Origin: London, England
- Genres: Alternative/Indie Rock; Indie Dance; Pop/Rock
- Years active: 2014–present
- Label: Fiction
- Members: Isabel Munoz-Newsome; Nicholas Owen; Tomoya Suzuki; Neville James
- Past members: Henry Brown
- Website: pumarosamusic.com

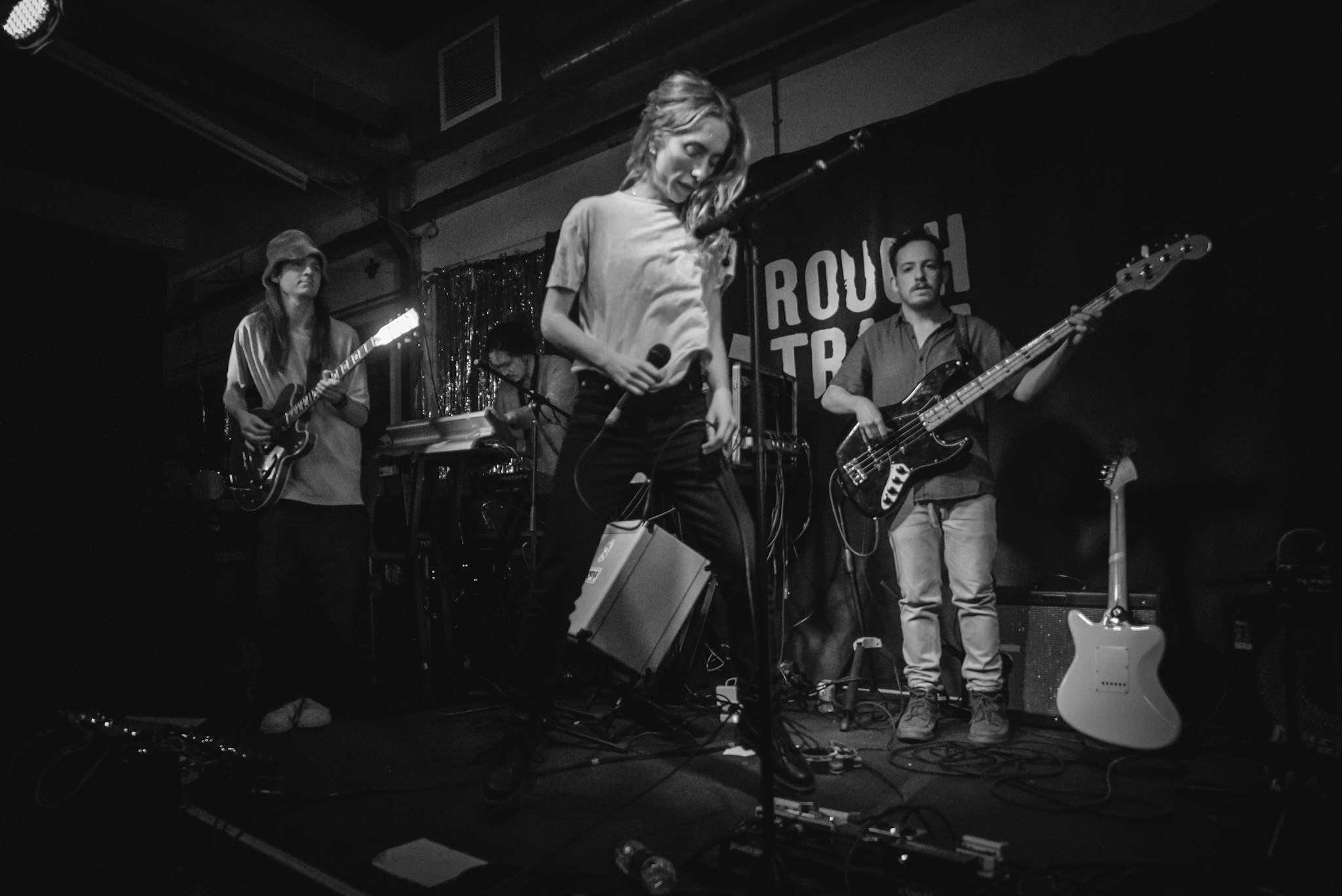
Pumarosa performing in London

Pumarosa is an English electronic rock band formed in North London in 2014. They have described their sound as "industrial spiritual".

In a Guardian review of a live performance in 2016, Pumarosa were called the "missing link between Joy Division and Pendulum".

== History ==
The band was initially started as a duo by Isabel Munoz-Newsome (vocals, guitar) and Nicholas Owen (drums), who had first met in 2011 through mutual friends and become part of a psychedelic punk band called Lion Child; following the group's disbanding, Munoz-Newsome played solo until 2014, when she re-united with Owen to start Pumarosa — whose name stems from the word pomarosa, a colloquial term for rose apple fruits. The band was later expanded to include Henry Brown (bass), Tomoya Suzuki (electronics) and Neville James (lead guitar). Munoz-Newsome, who had studied theatre design and helped create sets for plays in pub theatres and the Royal National Theatre before pursuing a musical career, also took care of the artwork and stage design for the band's projects and videography.

In 2015, Pumarosa signed a record deal with Chess Club Records before releasing their debut single, "Priestess", which was reportedly inspired by the dancing performances of Munoz-Newsome's sister, Fernanda, who also featured in the track's video-clip. The group then released two more singles, "Cecile" and "Honey" — the latter of which was inspired by the 2015 BBC documentary Bitter Lake, by Adam Curtis.

During the last months of 2016, the band were one of the support acts of Glass Animals for the North American and European dates of their promotional tour for the album How to Be a Human Being.

In May 2017, Pumarosa released their debut album, The Witch, under Fiction Records; the concept of the LP, which was produced by Dan Carey, was centered around Munoz-Newsome's reading of Caliban and the Witch by Silvia Federici, a book she described as "an incredible piece of work about the transition from feudalism to capitalism from the female perspective". The album received widespread critical acclaim following its release, and peaked at #72 on the UK Albums Chart. The same week of The Witch's release, Munoz-Newsome was diagnosed with cervical cancer after having a smear test; however, the band decided to fulfill all of their remaining planned events — including their first TV appearance, as they performed their single "Dragonfly" on the BBC Two programme Later... with Jools Holland — before the lead singer underwent a trachelectomy in June of the same year. In the following months, despite Munoz-Newsome still being in the early stages of recovery, the band opened for Interpol in the Mexico City gigs of their Turn On The Bright Lights Anniversary 15 Years Tour, before serving as one of the support acts of Depeche Mode's European dates of their Global Spirit Tour. Also in 2017, they were nominated for Best Breakthrough Act at the 2017 Q Awards.

In June 2018, Pumarosa took part in the Meltdown music festival at Southbank Centre, curated by Robert Smith. Bass player Henry Brown departed before the release of the band's second album, while Jamie MacMillan joined the group.

In 2019, the band released their second album, Devastation, via Fiction; Munoz-Newsome described its themes as "more personal and direct" than the ones explored on The Witch, as several songs reflected her process of recovery from cancer, as well as changes to band members' relationships; the album was produced by John Congleton, while bass patterns were provided by Justin Chancellor of Tool. Devastation peaked at #91 on the UK Albums Chart.

== Discography ==
=== Studio albums ===
| Title | Details | Peak chart positions |
| Title | Details | UK |
|---|---|---|
| The Witch | Released: 19 May 2017; Label: Fiction; Formats: CD, digital download, streaming, vinyl | 72 |
| Devastation | Released: 15 Nov 2019; Label: Fiction; Formats: CD, digital download, streaming, vinyl | 91 |

=== Extended plays ===
| Title | EP details |
|---|---|
| Pumarosa | Released: 28 October 2016; Label: Fiction; Format: CD, streaming, vinyl |

=== Singles ===
| Title | Year | Peak chart positions | Album |
| Title | Year | UK | Album |
|---|---|---|---|
| "Priestess" | 2015 | 37 | Pumarosa |
| "Cecile" | 2016 | 31 | Pumarosa |
| "Honey" | 2016 | 60 | Pumarosa |
| "Dragonfly" | 2017 | — | The Witch |
| "My Gruesome Loving Friend" | 2017 | — | The Witch |
| "La Guarida Del Leon" | 2017 | — | Non-album singles |
| "Sacerdotisa" | 2017 | — | Non-album singles |
| "Fall Apart" | 2019 | — | Devastation |
| "Heaven" | 2019 | — | Devastation |
| "I See You" | 2019 | — | Devastation |
| "Adam's Song" | 2019 | — | Devastation |
| "Into The Woods" | 2019 | — | Devastation |

=== Featured appearances ===
- Sasha – "Just Us" (2022) (with Pumarosa)
