= Husky Loops =

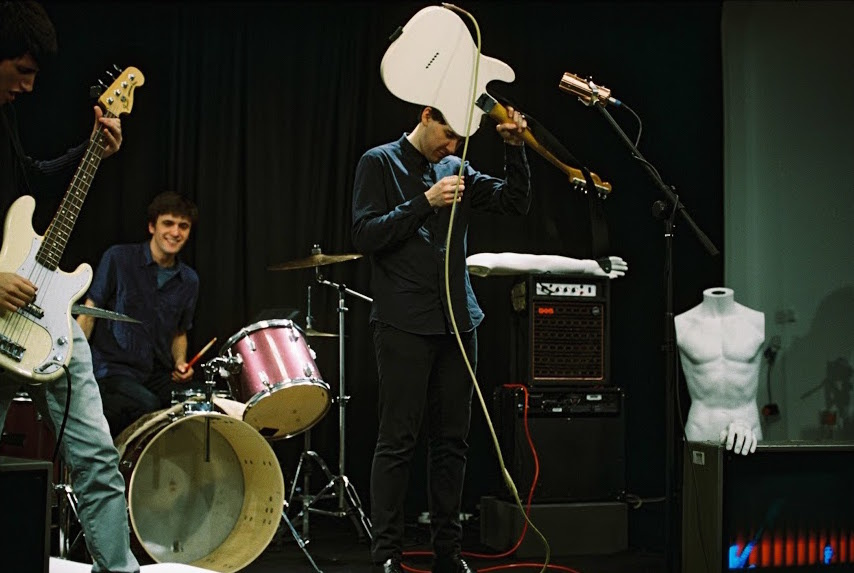
- Husky Loops on the music video set for their first single, "Dead". Photo by Magdalena Siwicka.

Background information
- Origin: London, UK; Bologna, IT
- Genres: Art rock; Alternative rock; Pop rock
- Years active: 2016 - present
- Labels: 30th Century Records; Alcopop! Records
- Members: Pier Danio Forni; Pietro Garrone; Tommaso Medica
- Website: huskyloops.com

Husky Loops is an Italian art rock band based in London, originally from Bologna. The band consists of singer, guitarist and producer Pier Danio Forni, bassist Tommaso Medica and drummer Pietro Garrone. As of September 2019, the group has released one album, three EPs, and one mixtape. They toured the world alongside acts such as Placebo, The Kills, Spoon and David Byrne. They have received critical acclaim from publications including Noisey, Clash and Billboard after being recognised for their ability to cross the boundaries of music genres; their sound stretches from rock to grime, also thanks to crossing paths with Boy Better Know’s Jammer.

== History ==
The band formed in 2015 while the three members were studying in London. Their first single "Dead" and its music video were picked up by Noisey and the exposure gained allowed the band to perform at many music festivals, including Lowlands in the Netherlands, to support The Kills in Germany, and to start their first headline tour across Europe.

In 2017, after having released two EPs, they were invited to support Placebo on their UK tour and Spoon on the European leg of their tour. In between the two tours, the band stopped by Maida Vale Studios in London for a BBC Radio 1 live session hosted by Huw Stephens.

In 2018, the band's third EP, Spool, was released on Danger Mouse’s label 30th Century Records. The EP was co-produced with Grammy award winning Tommaso Colliva and included the single "Everytime I Run", featured on the FIFA 19 soundtrack. The band teamed up with British photographer Rankin and ballet dancer Sergei Polunin to release a choreographed video for their song "Tempo", which was covered by Vogue and Nowness.

The band's debut album, I Can't Even Speak English, was released in 2019, featuring a campaign inviting fans to draw their own artworks on the blank album cover. Some artworks have been published on their social media platforms including the album covers made by iconic musicians Brian Eno and Roger Taylor. The album's lead single, "I Think You’re Wonderful", was Annie Mac’s Hottest Record In The World on BBC Radio 1.

== Discography ==
=== Albums ===
- I Can’t Even Speak English (2019)

=== EPs ===
- ultrarama (2024)
- Spool (2018)
- EP2 (2017)
- EP1 (2017)

=== Mixtapes ===
- Good As Gold (2018)

=== Singles ===
- "neggy" (2024)
- "Acting Stupid" (2024)
- "Project Missing" (2023)
- "You Bore Me" (2020)
- "Who Did You Call" (2019)
- "I Think You're Wonderful" (2019)
- "Everyone Is Having Fun Fun Fun But Me" (2019)
- "Lets Go for Nothing" (2019)
- "Everytime I Run" (2018)
- "Daft" (2018)
- "When I Come Home" (2018)
- "Fading Out" (2017)
- "Girl Who Wants To Travel the World" (2017)
- "Dead" (2016)
