= Buffseeds =

- Origin: Exeter, Devon, England
- Genres: Indie pop
- Years active: 1999–2004
- Label: Fantastic Plastic
- Website: Official (Iko)

The Buffseeds were an English indie pop band formed in Exeter, Devon, England, in 1999, consisting of Kieran Scragg on lead vocals and guitar, with Joel Scragg on bass, Ella Lewis on drums and Neil Reed on keyboards. They were active between 1999 and 2004. They are best known for the song "Sparkle Me", which featured in the ABC series Grey's Anatomy, Season 1, episode 5 - "Shake Your Groove Thing".

They released their one and only album, The Picture Show on 3 March 2003, playing at the Glastonbury Festival that same year. The album charted at 47 on the UK Official Independent Albums Chart. They also had four singles charting on the UK Official Singles Chart.

Lead singer Kieran Scragg and keyboarder Neil Read went on to form Iko.

== Discography ==
=== Studio albums ===
- The Picture Show (2003)
