= Awayland =

{Awayland}

Studio album by Villagers
- Released: 11 January 2013
- Recorded: Attica Audio, Donegal, Ireland
- Genre: Indie folk
- Length: 41:04
- Label: Domino
- Producers: Conor O'Brien & Tommy McLaughlin

Villagers chronology
Becoming a Jackal (2010)	{Awayland} (2013)	Darling Arithmetic (2015)

{Awayland} is the second studio album by Irish indie folk band Villagers, released on 11 January 2013 on Domino Records. Co-produced by band members Conor O'Brien and Tommy McLaughlin, the album was preceded by the single, "Nothing Arrived".

Like its predecessor, Becoming a Jackal (2010), the album has been nominated for the Mercury Prize.

== Background and recording ==
During the writing and process for {Awayland}, primary songwriter Conor O'Brien was influenced by Radiohead, Aphex Twin, Tricky and Björk, noting, "I bought my first synthesizer and learned how to use that and got a drum machine and a sampler and started making terrible techno music. Slowly words started appearing out of all these ambient soundscapes I was making and then I picked up the acoustic again and learnt how to finger pick properly. The whole album is really a by-product of that steep learning curve." At one stage, O'Brien considered recording an instrumental album, inspired by electronica and Krautrock.

O'Brien subsequently spent the next year recording rough demos for the album, before rehearsing them with the rest of the band: guitarist Tommy McLaughlin, pianist Cormac Curran, bass guitarist Daniel Snow, and drummer James Byrne. O'Brien noted, "After a year of working on my own, I spent four days kicking them around with the band, and it just became more visceral and groovier. I got rid of most of the electronic beds that I had made the song on. Stripping things back exposed the lyrics a bit more. Sometimes you can throw too much at something, and it just becomes weaker."

The band spent five weeks recording the album in Donegal, Ireland, at live-in studio, Attica Audio Recording.

== Writing and composition ==
Comparing {Awayland} to the band's predominately acoustic debut album, Becoming a Jackal (2010), primary songwriter Conor O'Brien noted, "After two years of touring, I started feeling like the worst writer in the world. There wasn't enough depth to maintain my interest every night. There’s no way I can sing “My love is selfish” a hundred time and it continue to feel pure and true. I felt, in a very childish way, I had romanticized sadness, and I was using the music to wallow. Even the acoustic guitar started sounding terrible to me."

O'Brien's initial demo recordings for the album ultimately differed from the final full band recordings. The track, "Passing a Message", was initially nine minutes long, with O'Brien describing it as "a big, ambient soundscape that peaked in the middle," which was inspired by astronomer Carl Sagan's writings. The album's first single, "Nothing Arrived", was at first, "a pretty mental, drum and bass electronica [song], [with] lyrics about cities crumbling and people dying, sounds of fire and apocalyptic things." After rehearsing the song with the rest of the band, the track became "a pretty straightforward folk rock song about smiling into the void."

Regarding his band mates contributions, O'Brien stated, "When I am on my own, it’s like an oil painting, I can put that on top of that and build up layers. But with the band, it turned out more watercolour, you’re leaving white bits of paper exposed, so that nothing is too overworked."

== Critical reception ==
Professional ratings
Aggregate scores
Source	Rating
AnyDecentMusic?	7.9/10
Metacritic	80/100
Review scores
Source	Rating
AllMusic	4/5 stars
The Guardian	4/5 stars
The Independent	5/5 stars
The Irish Times	5/5 stars
Mojo	4/5 stars
NME	7/10
The Observer	4/5 stars
Pitchfork	5.5/10
Q	4/5 stars
Uncut	8/10

The album received mostly positive reviews, and holds a Metacritic score of 80 out of 100, based on 27 reviews.

AllMusic's Scott Kerr gave the album a positive review, praising the contributions of the full-band recording: "The songs feel fuller as a result, and without the burden of playing every instrument, the Irishman [Conor O'Brien] has concentrated his efforts into his lyrics. [...] The creative progression O'Brien exhibits here leaves no lingering questions of doubt whether he would succumb to the dreaded second album syndrome, and regardless of awards, {Awayland} sees the Irishman at his best, both musically and lyrically."

Writing for The Guardian, Dave Simpson issued the album with another positive review, stating: "The dazzling imagery comes with a rollercoasting voyage through acoustic soul, brass and – a new development – electronica. Drake's gentle, ghostly hand is most audible in the damaged beauty of the title track and depression-conquering "Rhythm Composer". The soaring "Waves" and joyful, piano-led Waterboysy stomp of "Nothing Arrived" may be the best Villagers tunes to date."

NME's Lucy Jones gave the album a favourable review, paying praise to Conor O'Brien's vocals, stating that "O’Brien’s smiling-through-tears vocal that makes him sound like he’s going to explode with sorrow or joy at any minute is extraordinary."

== Track listing ==
All songs written by Conor O'Brien.

No.	Title	Length
1.	"My Lighthouse"	2:59
2.	"Earthly Pleasure"	4:10
3.	"The Waves"	5:01
4.	"Judgement Call"	3:23
5.	"Nothing Arrived"	3:46
6.	"The Bell"	5:09
7.	"{Awayland}"	2:35
8.	"Passing a Message"	2:59
9.	"Grateful Song"	4:24
10.	"In a Newfound Land You Are Free"	3:31
11.	"Rhythm Composer"	5:07
Total length:		43:06

== Personnel ==
=== Villagers ===
- Conor O'Brien – lead vocals, acoustic guitar, electric guitar (7), percussion, beats & samples, synthesizers
- Tommy McLaughlin – electric guitar, backing vocals, mandolin
- Cormac Curran – piano, organ, synthesizers, backing vocals, string and brass arrangements
- Danny Snow – bass guitar
- James Byrne – drums, percussion, lovely smile

=== Additional musicians ===
- Sean McCarron – saxophone
- Jacqueline McCarthy – French horn
- Rich Hadwen - viola
- Clare Hadwen - violin
- Alys Jackson - violin
- Claire Thatcher - violin
- Fergus Fitzpatrick - cello

=== Recording personnel ===
- Conor O'Brien - producer, mixing
- Tommy McLaughlin - producer, mixing
- Ian McNulty - additional engineering
- Guy Davie - mastering

=== Artwork ===
- Conor O'Brien - artwork, photography
- Matthew Cooper - design
- Rory McGuigan - additional design
- Daniel Snow - photography
- Enda Doran - photography
- Mette Svendsen - photography

== Chart positions ==
Chart (2013)	Peak position
Irish Albums Chart	1
Irish Independent Albums Chart	1

== Certifications ==
Region	Certification	Sales/shipments
Ireland (IRMA)	Gold	7,500^{×}
^{×} unspecified figures based on certification alone
