= Ikara Colt =

- Origin: London, England
- Genres: Indie rock, garage rock, art punk, art rock, lo-fi
- Years active: 1999–2005
- Labels: Epitaph, Fantastic Plastic
- Past members: Claire Ingram; Paul Resende; Dominic Young; Jon Ball; Tracy Bellaries

Ikara Colt were an English four-piece indie rock band, formed by art students at London Guildhall University. They had a five-year career, beginning in 1999 and ending on 17 January 2005. The band had stated in interviews their intention to disband before they "turn into some old, tired and jaded outfit". They broke up after two albums and one EP. In the UK, the band were signed to the London-based independent record label, Fantastic Plastic Records, while Epitaph distributed their records in the US.

The band were not typically associated with any particular music scene, playing on tour with a variety of diverse bands, though influences included bands such as Sonic Youth and The Fall.

In 2003, they undertook a six-week tour of the US, with Sweden's Sahara Hotnights and the US's The Washdown.

Original bass player Jon Ball left the band in 2003, to be replaced by Tracy Bellaries (formerly of Soulbossa), although Ball was still involved for most of the songwriting process and some of the recording of Modern Apprentice, the band's second and final album. Bellaries afterwards joined the group Mystery Meat, and later Part Chimp.

== Band members ==
- Claire Ingram (guitar/vocals)
- Paul Resende (vocals)
- Dominic Young (drums)
- Jon Ball (bass) (1999–2003)
- Tracy Bellaries (bass) (2003–2005)

== Discography ==
=== Albums ===
- Chat and Business – (March 2002)
  - Re-released in December 2003 with Basic Instructions EP
- Modern Apprentice – (June 2004)

Modern Apprentice is the final album released by Ikara Colt before their eventual break-up in January 2005. The album was recorded with Tracy Bellaries playing most of the bass parts, despite the fact she had not been in the band for most of the writing process but had only joined after the departure of Jon Ball. As such, a number of tracks credit both members due to Ball having written (or played) the bass lines in full or part. The album was released in June 2004 on Fantastic Plastic Records with the single Wanna be That Way preceding it. Wake in the City and Modern Feeling were also released as singles later in 2004. The track Automatic is followed by a short period of silence, and then a hidden song. At the end of the extra song, the voice of the band's singer Paul Resende can be heard remarking that "It's a concept".

=== EPs ===
- Basic Instructions EP – (September 2002) #7

=== Singles ===
- "Sink Venice" – May 2001 (b/w "At The Lodge" & "Escalate") #187
- "One Note" – October 2001 (b/w "Surf 2" & "Kite") #109
- "Rudd" – February 2002 (b/w "Your Vain Attempts" & "Memory") – UK #72
- "Live at the Astoria" – November 2003 (b/w "I'm With Stupid" & "At The Lodge")
- "Wanna Be That Way" – February 2004 (b/w "Leave This Country", "The Other" & "Start Up") – UK #49
- "Wake in the City" – May 2004 (b/w "Til The End", "Keep It To Yourself" & "Repetition") – UK #55
- "Modern Feeling" – October 2004 b/w "Seeing Double", "Ring Road" & "Modern Feeling JCB Mix") – UK #61
