= Astrid (band) =

Scottish guitar-pop foursome

Background information
- Origin: Isle of Lewis, Scotland
- Genres: Indie pop, pop rock
- Years active: 1997–2004, 2016-
- Labels: Fantastic Plastic Records; Mushroom Pillow; Muzak Records
- Members: William Campbell; Charles Clark; Neil Payne; Gareth Russell
- Past members: Gary Thom

Astrid is a guitar-pop foursome formed and based in Glasgow in the mid-1990s, but with strong ties to Isle of Lewis in the Hebrides, Scotland. The group released three studio albums, as well as several singles and EPs, before breaking up in 2004.

== History ==
Willie Campbell, Charles Clark and Gareth Russell were childhood friends who moved from the Isle of Lewis, off the West coast of Scotland, to Glasgow in the mid-1990s. There, the three began writing songs together; Campbell on vocals, Clark on acoustic guitar and Russell on bass guitar. They then met up with drummer Gareth Thom and began rehearsing in 1997. The group called themselves "Astrid" and quickly caught the attention of Belle & Sebastian who asked them to be their opening act, initially at a local gig and then on a small tour of the UK.

Astrid signed up with Fantastic Plastic Records, on which they released their first EP in 1998, No Reason. The group then teamed with former Orange Juice singer, Edwyn Collins, who produced their second EP, Hi-Fi Lo-Fi, which was also released in 1998. A single "It's True" was released the same year. Collins went to produce the group's debut album the following year, Strange Weather Lately. The album received positive reviews and sold well in the UK and in Europe, although no American distributor could be found. The band's sound was compared to that of fellow Scottish indie bands The Pastels and Teenage Fanclub.

A further EP called Modes of Transport was released in September 2000. The main single from the EP was made Single of the Week by Radio 1 DJ Simon Mayo, gaining further publicity and airplay for the group. As the band began recording their second full album, Thom left and was replaced by Neil Payne. Play Dead, the group's second album, was released in March 2001.

In 2004, Astrid released their third album - One in Four (named for the statistic that "one in four of us will suffer mental health problems at some time in our lives"). Whilst maintaining the pop sound of their earlier material, the new album featured darker lyrical content. Campbell left the band shortly afterwards, and the band broke up by the end of the year.

Neil Payne has since played drums for fellow Scottish band, Texas, Gareth Russell has played bass for Idlewild, Charlie Clark joined The Zephyrs, for their fourth studio album and went on to form now defunct bands Cold Night Song and Our Lunar Activities, and was involved with Broken Arrow and MJ12 (The Majestic 12). William Campbell formed Our Small Capital and The Open Day Rotation. Both Campbell and Clark continue to work on their solo careers.

Astrid reformed in the summer of 2016 for a series of gigs throughout Scotland, and began recording material for a planned new album.

In 2021, Charlie Clark released a solo album called Late Night Drinking which was the first album release on Alan McGee's relaunched 'It's Creation, Baby' record label and released a single called "Don't Have a Cow, Man!"

== Discography ==
=== Albums ===
- Strange Weather Lately (1999)
- Play Dead (2001)
- One in Four (2004)
- Fall, Stand, Dance (2019)

=== Singles and EPs ===
- Hi-Fi Lo-Fi EP
- "It's True" No. 153
- "No Reason"
- "What to Say"
- "Boy or Girl" / "Sleigh Ride" (2000)
- "Cherry Cherry" (2000)
- "High in the Morning" (2000) No. 156
- "Redground" (2000) No. 167
- Modes of Transport EP (2001)
- "Tick Tock" (2001) No. 103
- "It Never Happened" (2001) No. 112

=== Side projects ===
- The Reindeer Section - Y'All Get Scared Now, Ya Hear! (2001)
- The Reindeer Section - Son of Evil Reindeer (2002)
