= The North Sea Scrolls =

Studio album by Luke Haines, Cathal Coughlan, and Andrew Mueller
- Released: 19 November 2012
- Label: Fantastic Plastic

The North Sea Scrolls is a collaborative project by Luke Haines, Cathal Coughlan and Andrew Mueller which was performed live in 2011, with an album following in 2012.

== Background ==
Depicting an alternative musical history of the British Isles, The North Sea Scrolls was originally performed at the Edge Festival in Edinburgh in August 2011. The premise is that historical documents showing a different version of history were passed to Haines and Coughlan by the actor Tony Allen. The show featured songs based on this alternative history performed by Haines and Coughlan, with narration from Mueller.

Haines described his motivation for the project: "It occurred to me that we understand everything now. I wanted to do something that made people go, 'What the fuck is this?' There comes a time in a man's life, when he must make the ultimate concept album."

An album of the show was released on the Fantastic Plastic label on 19 November 2012. A limited edition two-disc version featured a full performance of the show on a second disc.

The album was described by Simon Price in The Independent as "deeply engrossing" and ringing "resoundingly with cultural and historical truth". Will Hodgkinson, writing in The Times gave the album a four star review. Jude Rogers, writing in The Guardian, described it as "a discombulating listen, but also a daft, enjoyable one". A series of live performances was announced for November and December 2012. It is thought that new work drawn from the Scrolls is unlikely to surface until such time as the social and political news in the English-speaking world ceases being so far-fetched, and emanating from such an implausible and unsympathetic cast of characters.

== Track listing ==
Disc 1

1. "Preamble - Intro"
2. "Broadmoor Blues Delta"
3. "Mr Cynthia"
4. "I'm Not The Man You Think I Am Karen, I'm The Actor Tony Allen"
5. "Witches In The Water"
6. "I Am Falconetti"
7. "The Papal Pagan"
8. "Ayatollah Cornelius"
9. "The Morris Man Cometh"
10. "Tim Hardin MP"
11. "Enoch Powell - Space Poet"
12. "The Australian IRA Show"
13. "My Mother My Dead Mother"
14. "Narration - (outro)"
15. "Anthem Of The Scrolls"

Disc 2

1. "Preamble – intro"
2. "Scroll 1"
3. "Broadmoor Blues Delta"
4. "Scroll 2"
5. "Mr Cynthia"
6. "Scroll 3"
7. "I'm Not The Man You Think I Am Karen, I'm The Actor Tony Allen"
8. "Scroll 4"
9. "Witches In The Water"
10. "Scroll 5"
11. "The Papal Pagan"
12. "Scroll 6"
13. "Ayatollah Cornelius"
14. "Scroll 7"
15. "I Am Falconetti"
16. "Scroll 8"
17. "The Morris Man Cometh"
18. "Scroll 9"
19. "Tim Hardin MP"
20. "Scroll 10"
21. "Enoch Powell Space Poet"
22. "Scroll 11"
23. "The Australian IRA Show"
24. "Scroll 12"
25. "My Mother My Dead Mother"
26. "Narration/outro"
27. "Anthem Of The Scrolls"
