= Aerial (Scottish band) =

Scottish musical group

- Origin: Aberdeen, Scotland
- Genres: Indie / Powerpop
- Years active: 1997-2002, 2013-
- Label: Fantastic Plastic Records / Syft Records / Thistime Records / Kool Kat Records / Flake Sounds
- Members: Colin Cummings; Mackie Mackintosh
- Past members: Paul Farquharson; Dale Potter; Scott Lyon; Andy Philips
- Website: aerial-music.com

Aerial are a power-pop band who formed in the late 1990s in Aberdeen, Scotland.

== History ==
Aerial are a power-pop band formed in Aberdeen, Scotland in the late 1990s. In 1999, the band signed to London-label Fantastic Plastic Records and recorded and released two EPs, Signal and Star of the Show in 2000.

Aerial played live across the UK in 2000 and 2001, making appearances at T in the Park, Glasgow’s Gig on the Green as part of a UK-tour with label-mates Astrid and Angelica. Aerial’s debut album, Back Within Reach, was recorded by Duncan Cameron at Riverside Studios in Glasgow and released by Japanese label Syft Records in 2001.

Aerial announced via their Twitter page that they had returned to the studio to record a new album, to be released in 2014. The resulting album, Why Don't They Teach Heartbreak At School?, was recorded by Ben Phillips at Lightship95 in London and released in September 2014 by Powerpop Academy / Thistime Records in Japan and Kool Kat Records in the US. The album was featured as BBC Radio Scotland's 'Record of Note' on The Roddy Hart Show on 12 September 2014 and was Goldmine Magazine's album of the year in 2014.

In 2022, the band returned to Riverside Studios, some 20 years after the Back Within Reach sessions, to work on a new album with Duncan Cameron once again producing. The album Activities of Daily Living was released in 2024 on limited edition vinyl by Japanese label Flake Sounds and on CD by US label Kool Kat Records.

== Discography ==
=== Albums ===
- Back Within Reach (SYFT-020LP, 2001)
- Why Don't They Teach Heartbreak At School? (XQER-1078, 2014 / PURR2049, 2014)
- Activities of Daily Living (FLAKES279, 2024 / PURR2286, 2024)

=== EPs and Singles ===
- Signal EP (FPS019 / SYFT009, 2000)
- Star of the Show EP (FPS022 / SYFT013, 2000)
- Hollywood Ghosts (2024)
- Pixelated Youth (2024)
