= The Victorian English Gentlemens Club =

Cardiff-based experimental art rock band

- Origin: Cardiff, Wales
- Genres: Indie rock, post-punk, art punk
- Years active: 2004–2016
- Labels: This Is Fake DIY Records, Flowershop Recordings, Fantastic Plastic Records
- Members: Adam Taylor; Louise Mason; James Griffiths; Heddwyn Davies
- Past members: Emma Daman; Dan Lazenby; Steph Jones

The Victorian English Gentlemens Club were a four-piece experimental art rock band based in Cardiff, Wales.

== Name ==
The name of the band is correctly spelt without an apostrophe. On their website, the band acknowledges they are "aware that there should be" an apostrophe. The name originated from style of the artwork of singer Adam.

== Debut album ==
The band was formed when Taylor and Mason met at Art College in Cardiff in 2004. Joined by drummer Daman they made their recording debut in early 2006; with the limited-edition "The Tales of Hermit Mark" / "My Son Spell Backwards" released in the spring and double A-side "Amateur Man" / "Ban the Gin" following that summer, both on Fantastic Plastic Records. Their self-titled debut album was released in Autumn 2006; first single "Impossible Sightings Over Shelton" debuted at number ten on the UK Indie Chart. While writing the next album, the band performed at SXSW festival in Austin, Texas in both 2007 and 2008, released a French language version of the previous single "La Mer" (as a split 7-inch with the Paris-based band, This is Pop), and did several support and headline tours in UK and Europe.

== Love on an Oil Rig ==
Love on an Oil Rig was the band's second full-length album. Like the first album, it was recorded with the original lineup of Taylor, Mason and Daman. It was released on 14 September 2009 on CD and 12-inch Vinyl on This Is Fake DIY Records in the UK, and Flowershop Recordings in Europe. The first single from it was "Parrot", released on Yellow Vinyl. The album was toured across the UK and Europe with Steph Jones and Dan Lazenby joining the band for live performances after drummer Daman's departure. Touring included a performance in the upper galleries of the National Museum of Wales in November 2009 to open SWN festival, after releasing a song written and recorded for an artwork in the current exhibition there. In the same year they also performed in a forest, on a mountain, in a kitchen and a theatre.

== Bag of Meat ==
James Griffiths became the band's drummer in April 2010. The third album, Bag of Meat was released on 11 June 2011 on This Is Fake DIY Records. The album was written by Adam Taylor and Louise Mason and James Griffiths, and produced and mixed in Music Box Studios, Cardiff by Charlie Francis. The sound of the band progressed from their early post punk minimalism, to a darker, heavier and rawer sound. The band toured the album widely across Europe, playing shows in Russia and Slovakia.

== GYTS ==
Heddwyn Davies joined the band in 2011 playing viola and electric mandolin. The fourth album, GYTS, was recorded in Paris over the summer of 2013, and was released in November 2016. It was released after the band had broken up. A very limited run of 100 vinyls were pressed, although a CDr was available on demand from Amazon and it is still available digitally on Bandcamp.

== Discography ==
=== Studio albums ===
- 2006: The Victorian English Gentlemens Club
- 2009: Love on an Oil Rig
- 2011: Bag of Meat
- 2016: GYTS

=== Singles ===
- "The Tales of Hermit Mark/My Son Spells Backwards" (double A-side) (2006), Fantastic Plastic Records
- "Amateur Man/Ban the Gin" (double A-side) (2006), Fantastic Plastic - #170 UK
- "Pedestrian" (2006) (7-inch split single), Fantastic Plastic
- "Impossible Sightings Over Shelton" (2006), Fantastic Plastic - #161 UK
- "Stupid as Wood/La Mer" (7-inch vinyl in wooden sleeve) (2007), Fantastic Plastic
- "La Mer" (French language version) (7-inch split single), LSM Records
- "Parrot" (7-inch yellow vinyl) (2009), This Is Fake DIY Records
- "Watching the Burglars" (2009), This Is Fake DIY
- "Bored in Belgium" (7-inch vinyl) (2010), This Is Fake DIY
- "A Biting Wind Followed by an Occasional Drift of Snow (Was No Way to Cure a Hangover)" (2010), This Is Fake DIY
- "Bag of Meat" (flexi-disc) (2011), This Is Fake DIY
- "A Conversation" (2011), This Is Fake DIY

=== Other releases ===
- "The Victorian English Gentlemens Club" (promo CDr) (2004), no label
- "The Victorian English Gentlemens Club" (promo CDr) (2005), no label
- "Blood Pie" (yellow cassette) (2011), This Is Fake DIY Records
