= Threatmantics =

Welsh alternative rock band

- Origin: Cardiff, Wales
- Genre: Alternative rock
- Years active: 2005 – present
- Label: Double Six (Domino Records)
- Members: Heddwyn Davies; Viola & Vocals (2005 – present) Huw Alun Davies; Drums, Keyboard & Vocals (2005–2010) (2010 – present) Andrew Lewis; Guitar & Vocals (2009 – present) Gareth Middleton; Bass (2010 – present)
- Past members: Taliesyn Källström; Percussion, Keyboard & Vocals (2009–2010) Dan Lazenby; Drums (2010) Ceri Mitchell; Guitar (2006–2009) Mark Thomas; Guitar (2009) Franic Rozycki; Guitar (2005–2006) Luke Mintowt-czyz; Guitar (2005)
- Website: http://www.threatmantics.com

Threatmantics are a Welsh band from Cardiff, Wales. The band's current members are Heddwyn Davies (vocals, viola), Andrew Lewis (guitar), Gareth Middleton (bass) and Huw Alun Davies (drums). Their first album Upbeat Love was recorded whilst the band was still a three-piece (Heddwyn, Ceri & Huw) and was released by Domino Records' subsidiary label Double Six Records on 3 November 2008. Stereogum named Threatmantics a Band To Watch on 13 November 2008. The band's long-awaited second album, Kid McCoy, was released in late 2012. The singles from it got heavy airplay on BBC Radio Wales and BBC Radio Cymru and were also played on BBC Radio 6 Music. DJ Adam Walton included "Esgryn" on his "Best of 2012" list.

== Line-up changes ==
- Heddwyn, Huw & Luke (2005)
- Heddwyn, Huw & Franic (2005–2006)
- Heddwyn, Huw & Ceri (2006–2009)
- Heddwyn, Huw & Mark (2009)
- Heddwyn, Huw, Andrew & Taliesyn (2009–2010)
- Heddwyn, Andrew, Taliesyn, Gareth & Dan (2010)
- Heddwyn, Andrew, Taliesyn, Gareth & Huw (2010)
- Heddwyn, Andrew, Gareth & Huw (2010–present)

== Discography ==
=== Albums ===
- Upbeat Love (3 November 2008)
- Kid McCoy (10 December 2012, though was available online from 29 November)

=== Singles ===
- "Little Bird" – Digital Only (February 2009)
- "Big Man" – 7" (October 2008)
- "Sali Mali" / "Wedi Marw" – 7" (August 2007)
- "Don't Care" – CD (March 2007)
- "Apple Tree" (2012)
- "Esgryn" (2012)
