= Help She Can't Swim =

English band

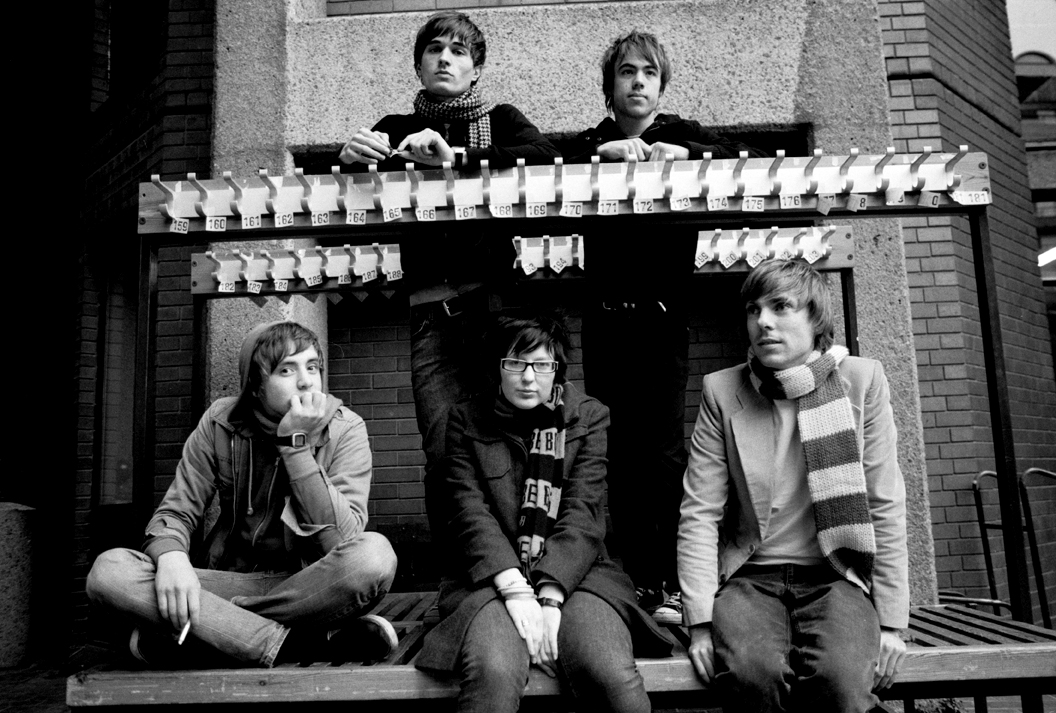

Background information
- Origin: Southampton, Brighton, England
- Genres: Indie rock art rock
- Years active: 2003–2008
- Labels: Fantastic Plastic Records (UK), Vacuous Pop
- Past members: Tom Denney (vocals/guitar/keyboard); Leesey Frances (vocals/keyboard); Tim Palmer (bass/keyboard); Lewis Baker (drums); Tom Baker (guitar/bass/keyboard)

Help She Can't Swim was an English indie/art rock band, formed in Southampton in 2003. The band released a number of singles on Fantastic Plastic Records, along with an EP and two albums. Before signing to Fantastic Plastic, they had released one EP entitled Suck Our Band (a phrase taken from the lyrics of their song "Are You Feeling Fashionable?") on the Vacuous Pop label. While originally recorded as a demo, Vacuous Pop were so taken with the 'Suck Our Band' recordings that they had to be given a proper release. Originally a five-piece, one of the founding members, Tom Baker, left the band in 2006, before the release of the band's second album The Death of Nightlife, though still contributed to the recording which had mostly been completed before his departure. The band announced they had split up on 26 May 2008 on their Myspace blog. Their reasoning behind the breakup, as quoted from their MySpace blog was "There are a lot of things that the four of us need to do personally that being in the band does not allow. We have had an amazing time being in HSCS; we got to release our music, tour, play shows with some great bands and met lots of lovely people."

A compilation album of b-sides was released digitally in 2010 called 'B Sides'.

Following the split members of the band have gone on to form new projects. Tom Denney released solo material under the name Lonely Ghosts and performed in the live band for Nullifier. He then formed the band Soft Arrows in 2011 with ex-members of My Device, as well as Nature Channel in 2013. Leesey Frances contributed vocals and clarinet to tracks on the Lonely Ghosts album and mini-album, as well as performing at live shows. In 2013 she formed a new band, Daskinsey4. Lewis Baker went on to play in Spaghetti Anywhere, Warm Brains and Colours. Tom Baker later joined Colours, changing their name to Great Ytene.

Lewis Baker died in 2021, in 2022 the band announced special one-off reunion gigs in 2023 in tribute to Baker, with all proceeds going to St Joseph's Hospice in London.

== Band members ==
- Tom Denney – vocals, guitar, keyboards
- Leesey Frances – vocals, keyboards
- Tim Palmer – bass guitar, keyboards
- Lewis Baker – drums
- Tom Baker (2003–2006) – guitar, bass, keyboards

== Discography ==
Help She Can't Swim playing The Cluny, Newcastle

=== Albums ===
- Fashionista Super Dance Troupe – (December 2004)
- The Death of Nightlife – (May 2007)
- "B Sides" - (January 2010)

=== Singles ===
- "Bunty vs Beano" – (September 2004)
- "I Don't Need You" – (March 2005)
- "Midnight Garden" – (March 2006)
- "Hospital Drama" – (March 2007)

=== EPs ===
- Suck Our Band – (June 2004)
- Committing Social Suicide – (December 2005)
- Pass The Hat Around – (November 2007)
