= Becoming a Jackal =

Studio album by Villagers
- Released: 24 May 2010
- Length: 44:28
- Label: Domino
- Producer: Conor J. O'Brien

Villagers chronology
Becoming a Jackal (2010)	Awayland (2013)

Becoming a Jackal is the debut album by the Irish rock group Villagers. In 2010 it was nominated for the Mercury Prize. Vinyl editions of the album contain 2 discs, with tracks on the first three sides and an etching on the fourth.

== Critical reception ==
Professional ratings
Aggregate scores
Source	Rating
AnyDecentMusic?	7.7/10
Metacritic	78/100
Review scores
Source	Rating
AllMusic	3.5/5 stars
The Daily Telegraph	5/5 stars
The Guardian	4/5 stars
The Irish Times	4/5 stars
Mojo	4/5 stars
NME	8/10
Pitchfork	6.9/10
Q	4/5 stars
Rolling Stone	3.5/5 stars
Uncut	4/5 stars

The album received positive reviews, and holds a Metacritic score of 78 out of 100, based on 16 reviews.

== Track listing ==
No.	Title	Length
1.	"I Saw the Dead"	5:04
2.	"Becoming a Jackal"	3:19
3.	"Ship of Promises"	4:36
4.	"The Meaning of the Ritual"	3:14
5.	"Home"	4:41
6.	"That Day"	3:10
7.	"The Pact (I'll Be Your Fever)"	3:28
8.	"Set the Tigers Free"	3:22
9.	"Twenty Seven Strangers"	3:24
10.	"Pieces"	5:28
11.	"To Be Counted Among Men"	4:43
Total length:		44:28

== Chart positions ==
Chart (2010)	Peak position
Irish Independent Albums (IRMA)	1
