= Eastern Lane =

- Origin: Berwick-upon-Tweed, England, UK
- Genres: Indie rock
- Years active: 2001–2006
- Label: Rough Trade
- Past members: Derek Meins; Andrew Lawton; Stuart Newlands; Danny Ferguson
- Website: www.easternlane.com

Eastern Lane were an English indie band from Berwick-upon-Tweed, comprising Derek Meins (vocals/guitar), Andrew Lawton (guitar), Stuart Newlands (bass) and Danny Ferguson (drums). Their name was taken from a street in their hometown. The band was formed in 2001.

The band released two albums: Shades of Black in 2003 and The Article in 2005. Both albums are on the Rough Trade label. Their song, "Feed Your Addiction" was featured in an HSBC advertisement.

In late 2006 the band went their separate ways, according to a posting on the band's MySpace site, the split was down to the fact they have been unable to release any new material "due to circumstances with labels and money etc."

Derek Meins is now pursuing a solo career, performing and releasing as The Agitator.

== Discography ==
=== Studio albums ===
Title	Album details	Peak chart positions
Title	Album details	UK Indie
Shades of Black	Released: 18 May 2003; Label: Rough Trade (#RTRADE086); Formats: CD	—
The Article	Released: 7 February 2005; Label: Rough Trade (#RTRAD184); Formats: CD	47
"—" denotes items that did not chart or were not released in that territory.

=== EPs ===
- Last Excerpt (2002)

=== Singles ===
Year	Title	Peak chart positions			Album
Year	Title	UK	UK Indie	SCO	Album
2003	"Feed Your Addiction"	72	10	80	The Article
2004	"Saffron"	55	8	55	The Article
2004	"I Said Pig on Friday"	65	10	47	The Article
"—" denotes items that did not chart or were not released in that territory.
