= Villagers (band) =

Irish indie folk band

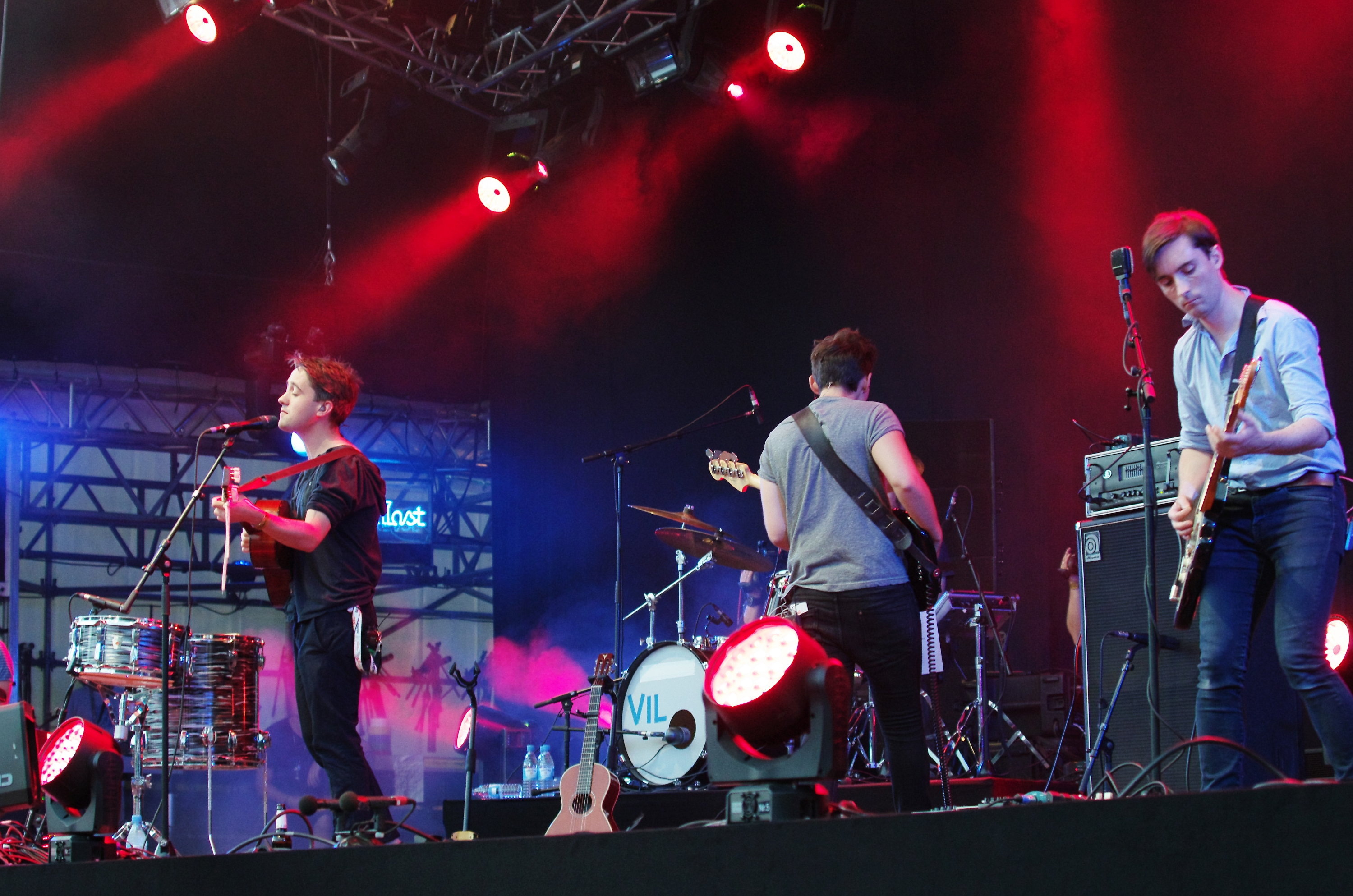

Background information
- Origin: Dún Laoghaire, Dublin, Ireland
- Genres: Alternative
- Years active: 2008–present
- Labels: Domino Records, Any Other City (2008–2009)
- Members: Conor O'Brien; Danny Snow; Brendan Jenkinson; Kenny Corcoran; Brendan Doherty
- Past members: Cormac Curran; Marcus Hamblett; Gwion Llewelyn; Mali Llywelyn; Tommy McLaughlin; James Byrne; Richie Egan; Jack Magner
- Website: www.wearevillagers.com

Villagers are an Irish indie folk band and the musical project of the sole long-term member, Conor J O'Brien who is a singer-songwriter based in Dublin, Ireland.. Widely known for his production, arrangements and thought-provoking lyrics, O'Brien currently releases Villagers material via Domino Recording Co.

Villagers first came to prominence in 2010 with the release of their debut album, Becoming a Jackal. Released to critical acclaim, the album was shortlisted for the 2010 Mercury Prize and the Choice Music Prize. Their second studio album, {Awayland} was released in 2013. It won the Choice Music Prize that year and was also shortlisted for the 2013 Mercury Prize. In 2015 Conor released Villagers' third album, Darling Arithmetic, and the following year Where Have You Been All My Life?—a compilation of live reworkings of some of the band's best-known tracks. In May 2016 Darling Arithmetic won the Ivor Novello Award for Best Album. The Art of Pretending to Swim followed in September 2018. Villagers' fifth studio album Fever Dreams was released on 20 August 2021. Villagers have extensively toured in Ireland, UK and Europe, and have made several visits to play in the United States, Japan, Canada and Australia.

== History ==
Conor O'Brien formed Villagers after the break-up of his previous band The Immediate. The very next day, O'Brien wrote the first song after waking up with a hangover. O'Brien's time as a guitarist in Cathy Davey's band was also critical to the development of his style as he had never before performed alongside anyone outside of The Immediate. Villagers gave their first live performance as a support act with The Chapters at a show in Whelan's in November 2008. At that point the band had previously only rehearsed together on two occasions. They had only seven songs, written by O'Brien and passed on to the rest of the band to learn.

Villagers performed on the seventh series of RTÉ Two's Other Voices television programme in 2009. The band's debut EP, titled Hollow Kind, was released in February 2009. It contained four tracks, all of which were written and performed by O'Brien. The EP brought comparisons with Bright Eyes and Sparklehorse. Villagers then went on tour. They were a support act for Neil Young and toured across Europe with Tracy Chapman.

Villagers appeared at several festivals in 2009. They supported Bell X1 when they performed at Live at the Marquee in Cork on 26 June 2009. They performed at several music festivals in Ireland, including on the Sunday of Oxegen 2009, at Indie-pendence on 2 August and at Electric Picnic 2009, as well as at Latitude Festival in the UK. The Irish Times's Jim Carroll recommended their performance in the Body Soul Arena at Electric Picnic 2009 as "A must-see for those who dig ragged pop, eerie folk and heartfelt, emotional songs and sounds". They headlined Hard Working Class Heroes in 2009, with O'Brien attracting the ire of the audience when he requested some quiet during the performance. They gave a live performance at The Music Show in Dublin's RDS in October 2009.

The debut single of Villagers was "On a Sunlit Stage" and was released in October 2009.

On 15 January 2010, Villagers represented Ireland at the Eurosonic Festival in Groningen, the Netherlands. They were involved in efforts to raise funds in the aftermath of the 2010 Haiti earthquake. They embarked on a tour with Tindersticks in March 2010 and released the single "Becoming a Jackal" on 17 April 2010. A debut album Becoming a Jackal was released in Ireland on 14 May 2010, with a UK release in May and a US release due on 8 June 2010. O'Brien's elder sister died within the same week. The album immediately went to number one on both the Irish Albums Chart and the Irish Indie Albums Chart. It proceeded to continuously top the indie chart.

On 13 April 2010, Villagers appeared on Later... with Jools Holland on BBC Two alongside Paul Weller, Hot Chip, Marina and the Diamonds, Gogol Bordello and Paul Rodgers. Shane Hegarty, writing in The Irish Times, noted in his praise for O’Brien that "Irishness wasn't a factor [...] The pithy introduction to his performance didn't mention it. It didn't need to. Viewers could have thought he was from Northampton or New York or anywhere". His appearance included a performance of the single "Becoming a Jackal", but then found himself stranded in Brussels due to the air travel disruption around Europe in the aftermath of the eruption of Eyjafjallajökull in Iceland and had to miss a live performance on Record Store Day.

Villagers played Meltdown in London in June 2010. In the same month Villagers performed a U.S. tour and performed at Live at the Marquee in Cork on 25 June 2010. There was a performance at Oxegen 2010 in July. They were one of the first acts to be announced for Electric Picnic 2010. They also played on the Festival Republic Stage during the Leeds/Reading Festival 2010 A U.S. tour was announced for October and November 2010. In March 2011, Villagers joined Elbow on a two-week tour of the U.K. and Ireland.

As part of Record Store Day 2011, Villagers released a live 12" vinyl record, Live at the Workman's Club. The record contains mainly O'Brien performing songs acoustically with occasional piano accompaniment.

In September 2012 the band announced the release of "The Waves", the first single from their follow-up album. While at the time the name of the album wasn't announced, the details for {Awayland} were released soon afterwards alongside news of a headline tour in February 2013. The band were just about to start a tour supporting Grizzly Bear in October 2012. A second single, "Nothing Arrived", was also announced in December 2012 with a release date set for 14 January 2013 in conjunction with the launch of {Awayland}.

Whilst on tour supporting {Awayland}, the band debuted two new songs; "Occupy Your Mind" and "Hot Scary Summer". On 7 February 2014 "Occupy Your Mind" was released as a single, produced and mixed by James Ford. As part of Record Store Day 2014, a limited edition clear 7" vinyl version of "Occupy Your Mind" was released.

In early February 2015 the release of their third LP Darling Arithmetic was announced for the 10th/13th/14 April in Ireland, the U.K/Europe and the U.S.A respectively. The new album was written, recorded, produced and mixed by Conor O'Brien at his own home, with him playing all instruments on the record, similar to Becoming A Jackal. A tour was announced, with several dates in Ireland, the U.K and throughout Europe, and a show in New York supporting Laura Marling. In March 2015, when promoting the band's upcoming album and tour in Ireland, O'Brien spoke to GiggingNI.com about the songwriting process on Darling Arithmetic as well as addressing love and the issue of homophobia.

On 8 January 2016, the band's fourth album - mostly consisting of live versions of previously released songs - was released unter the title Where Have You Been All My Life? The band toured worldwide throughout 2016 supporting the album.

In August 2018 new album The Art of Pretending to Swim was announced for a 21 September release and new song, FOOL and accompanying music video was unveiled.

On 15 August 2019, the band played at Leith Theatre as part of the Edinburgh International Festival's contemporary music programme. They also appeared at Green Man Festival and headlined a show at Iveagh Gardens, Dublin during the summer.

Villagers released their 5th studio album "Fever Dreams" on 20 August 2021 via Domino Records. In Oct 2021 they toured in UK, headlining London's Roundhouse where they were joined onstage by Paul Weller. "Fever Dreams" featured highly in 2021's Albums of The Year, including a Top 10 in Mojo, and Number 1 in Hot Press, Irish Times & Irish Independent.

In 2022 Villagers will be touring in UK in March and Europe in May. They have also announced a headlining show at Dublin's Iveagh Gardens on Thurs 14 July 2022.

"Everything I am Is Yours" from the band's 2015 album "Darling Arithmetic" was featured in the 2024 film "We Live In Time", featuring Florence Pugh and Andrew Garfield as Almut and Tobias, respectively.

== Style ==
O'Brien is noted for his dark lyrics – "an eerie sense of disquiet", according to The Guardian. The New York Times' Jon Pareles compared them to The Frames, U2 and Leonard Cohen after witnessing a live performance in New York City in 2010.

== Discography ==
=== Studio albums ===
Year	Album details	Peak chart positions						
Year	Album details	IRL	UK	UK Indie	BEL	FRA	GER	NLD
2010	Becoming a Jackal: Released: 7 May 2010; Label: Domino; Formats: CD, download, vinyl etched DBL LP	1	66	1	83	—	—	—
2013	{Awayland}: Released: 14 January 2013; Label: Domino; Formats: CD, download, vinyl LP	1	16	2	17	—	53	16
2015	Darling Arithmetic: Released: 13 April 2015; Label: Domino; Formats: CD, download	1	27	6	27	128	74	22
2016	Where Have You Been All My Life? (live album): Released: 8 January 2016; Label: Domino; Formats: CD, download	13	—	—	23	—	—	—
2018	The Art of Pretending to Swim: Released: 21 September 2018; Label: Domino; Formats: CD, vinyl LP, digital	2	28	—	31	—	55	76
2021	Fever Dreams: Released: 20 August 2021; Label: Domino; Formats: CD, vinyl LP, digital	2	19	—	97	—	20	97
2024	That Golden Time: Released: 10 May 2024; Label: Domino; Formats: CD, vinyl LP, digital	12	82	—	—	—	—	—
"—" denotes a title that did not chart.

=== EPs ===
Year	EP details
2009	Hollow Kind: Released: 2009; Label: Any Other City
2019	The Sunday Walker: Released: 4 Nov 2019; Label: Domino

=== Singles ===
Year	Single	Chart positions	
Year	Single	IRL	UK
2009	"On a Sunlit Stage"	—	—
2010	"Becoming a Jackal"	—	—
2010	"Ship of Promises"	—	—
2010	"That Day"	—	—
2012	"The Waves"	—	—
2012	"Passing a Message"	—	—
2012	"Nothing Arrived"	48	—
2014	"Occupy Your Mind"	—	—
2015	"Courage"	—	—
2015	"Everything I Am Is Yours"	—	—
2018	"A Trick of the Light"	—	—
2018	"Fool"	—	—
2019	"Summer's Song"	—	—
2021	"The First Day"	—	—
2021	”So Simpatico”	—	—
2021	”Circles In The Firing Line”	—	—
"—" denotes a title that did not chart

== Honours ==
Villagers are the only act from Ireland to have been signed by Domino Records. Jape's Richie Egan has said of O'Brien: "That gentleman embodies everything I hold dear about music". He spoke of feeling inspired after attending one of their early shows, at a time when he himself had just won the Choice Music Prize.

The Irish Times placed them at number six in a list of "The 50 Best Irish Acts Right Now" published in April 2009, commenting: "from what we’ve heard and seen live so far, Villagers generate the type of music (sparse, eerie, casually dishevelled, tangibly cool) that will spread beyond the confines of niche appreciation into a great blue yonder".

=== Mercury Prize ===
Becoming a Jackal was nominated for the Mercury Prize on 20 July 2010, with the judges describing it as "a record of great charm and mystery". According to The Guardian, "an eerie stillness" occurred when the song "Becoming a Jackal" was performed at the event announcing the nominations.

Year	Nominee / work	Award	Result
2010	Becoming a Jackal	Mercury Prize	Nominated
2013	{Awayland}	Mercury Prize	Nominated

=== Q Awards ===
Year	Nominee / work	Award	Result
2010	Villagers	Breakthrough Artist	Nominated

=== Digital Socket Awards ===
Year	Nominee / work	Award	Result
2011	Becoming a Jackal	Best Design (Website, Artwork, Posters)	Nominated
2011	Becoming a Jackal	Album of the Year	Nominated
2011	Becoming a Jackal	Best Folk	Won
2011	The Meaning of the Ritual	Song of the Year	Won

=== Choice Music Prize ===
Becoming a Jackal was nominated for the Choice Music Prize in 2011. {Awayland} won the Choice Music Prize in 2013.

Year	Nominee / work	Award	Result
2011	Becoming a Jackal	Irish Album of the Year 2010	Nominated
2013	{Awayland}	Irish Album of the Year 2013	Won
2015	Darling Arithmetic	Irish Album of the Year 2015	Nominated
2018	The Art Of Pretending To Swim	Irish Album of the Year 2018	Nominated
2021	Fever Dreams	Irish Album of the Year 2021	Nominated

=== Ivor Novello ===
In May 2011 Villagers frontman Conor O'Brien won the award for Best Song Musically and Lyrically – the most prestigious of the Ivors – for the group's track "Becoming A Jackal".

In May 2016 the band's third album, Darling Arithmetic, won Best Album at that year's Ivor Novello awards.

Year	Nominee / work	Award	Result
2011	Becoming a Jackal	Best Song Musically and Lyrically	Won
2016	Darling Arithmetic	Best Album	Won

=== MOJO Honours List ===
Year	Nominee / work	Award	Result
2011	Villagers	Breakthrough Act	Nominated
