= Label Fandango =

Independent record label run out of the above company

- Parent company: Fierce Panda/Pointy Records
- Founded: 2005–2006
- Founder: Simon Williams (Fierce Panda); Andy Macleod (Pointy Records)
- Genre: Various
- Country of origin: United Kingdom
- Location: Highbury, London
- Official website: Club Fandango

Label Fandango is an independent record label based in Highbury, London. Evolving out of parent companies Fierce Panda Records and Pointy Records, it has been releasing limited edition music singles since 2005. It is run by live music promotion company Club Fandango.

== Origin and format ==
In late 2005, Label Fandango Records, was set up in order to release music from new and up-and-coming bands based in the UK. It began through Andy Macleod and Simon Williams, of Pointy Records and Fierce Panda Records respectively, who together were the creators of London live music promotions company Club Fandango. Williams had previously released the debut singles by Coldplay and Keane.

The no-budget record company has a strictly DIY theme to it, with the tag line "No frills, All thrills". Inspired by other indie labels Transgressive, Marquis Cha Cha and Dance to the Radio, it specialises in limited edition seven-inch vinyls, released in a generic black and while sleeve branded with the "Label Fandango" logo. It complements its Fierce Panda parent, who recently ceased producing limited singles to focus on full-length releases. The records are designed to project bands on to further opportunities with more major record labels, examples being Royworld and Air Traffic (who have since signed to Virgin Records and Tiny Consumer of EMI respectively). The label has released 24 limited edition singles to date.

== Recent activity ==
Fandango's most recent record, a double-A side of "Runaround Getaround / MOR" by Tim Ten Yen, is set for release on 6 October 2008. On the label's website, Label Fandango's promoters have stated that although they wish to continue releasing limited singles, they wish to move on to releasing full-length albums in the coming months. In 2011 the label released the double A sided single from the Sheffield-based band Hey Sholay entitled Dreamboat/The Bears The Clock The Bees.

== List of releases (2005 – present) ==
Each vinyl release has an accompanying digital download, which is accessed through the 7digital catalogue.

| Date of Release | Title | Artist | Catalogue No. |
|---|---|---|---|
| 7 November 2005 | "Terry / Love in Practice, Not Theory" | The Hot Puppies | Galagos001 |
| 30 January 2006 | "Jean Michel Jarre / One > 100" | Kapowski | Galagos002 |
| 22 February 2006 | "This Town / Grow Your Own" | The on Offs | Galagos003 |
| 10 April 2006 | "Finding It Hard / Never Enough" | Dirty Little Faces | Galagos004 |
| 17 July 2006 | "Just Abuse Me / Charlotte" | Air Traffic | Galagos005 |
| 6 November 2006 | "Kirsten Dunst / Harlesden" | Brinkman | Galagos006 |
| 29 January 2006 | "Leigh-On Sea / Tenement (demo)" | Assembly Now | Galagos007 |
| 12 February 2007 | "You Are One of the Few Outsiders Who Really Understands Us / In The Trunk" | Fanfarlo | Galagos008 |
| 16 April 2007 | Games EP ("Games / Wild Birds / Valentine") | The Moths! | Galagos010 |
| 23 April 2007 | "Song of a Page / In Bloom (Live)" | Hush the Many (Heed the Few) | Galagos009 |
| 21 May 2007 | "Johnny Negro / Ctrl Alt Delete" | Quad Riot | Galagos011 |
| 28 May 2007 | "Speak To Me Bones / Death By Fire (Live)" | Land of Talk | Galagos012 |
| 16 July 2007 | "Each Year / A Manner To Act" | Ra Ra Riot | Galagos013 |
| 10 September 2007 | "I Can't Bring The Time Back / Serious Thing" | Misty's Big Adventure | Galagos014 |
| 17 September 2007 | "Romantic / With Loaded Guns" | This City | Galagos015 |
| 17 September 2007 | "She Get It / Friday, Don't Need It" | Free Runner | Galagos016 |
| 8 October 2007 | "Still Fond / Closed Eyes" | Cut Off Your Hands | Galagos017 |
| 22 October 2007 | "Money / Magazine" | Daggers | Galagos018 |
| 3 December 2007 | "Elasticity / Tinman" | Royworld | Galagos019 |
| 28 July 2008 | "Flowers / If You Wonder" | The Ruling Class | Galagos020 |
| 11 August 2008 | "Bright Lights / Got A Lover" | Capital | Galagos021 |
| 11 August 2008 | "Slow Parade / The Problem With Remembering" | Broken Records | Galagos022 |
| 6 October 2008 | "Runaround Getaround / MOR" | Tim Ten Yen | Galagos023 |
| 6 July 2009 | "Saints" / "Get Right Back (Where We Started From)" | Army Navy | Galagos024 |
| 4 October 2010 | "Actions" / "Circles" | Films of Colour | Galagos031 |

27 June 2011 "Dreamboat" / "The Bears The Clock The Bees" Hey Sholay

== See also ==
- Lists of record labels
- Club Fandango
- Fierce Panda Records
- Pointy Records
