= Latitude Festival =

Annual music and arts festival in Suffolk, England

Coordinates: 52.3388°N 1.5977°E

- Dates: 25 – 28 July
- Locations: Henham Park, Suffolk, England
- Years active: 2006–present
- Capacity: 45,000
- Website: Latitudefestival.com

Latitude Festival is an annual music and arts festival set within the grounds of Henham Park, near Southwold, Suffolk, England.

The first edition of the festival took place in 2006 and has continued annually (apart from 2020 when it was cancelled due to COVID-19 pandemic).

The festival is run by Festival Republic (formerly the Mean Fiddler Group).

== Latitude Festival 2006 ==
Day	Act
Friday 14 July	Snow Patrol; The Zutons; The Lemonheads
Saturday 15 July	Antony and the Johnsons; Patti Smith; Larrikin Love; Soft Hearted Scientists; Field Music
Sunday 16 July	Mogwai; Paolo Nutini; Archie Bronson Outfit

== Latitude Festival 2007 ==
Day/Arena	Obelisk Arena	Uncut Arena	Sunrise Arena	The Lake Stage
Friday 13 July	Damien Rice; Cake; Wilco; The Magic Numbers	Patrick Wolf; Air Traffic; Albert Hammond Jr.	New Young Pony Club; Bonde do Rolê; Les Rita Mitsouko	I Was a Cub Scout; The All New Adventures of Us; Metronomy; Brigadier Ambrose
Saturday 14 July	The Good, the Bad & the Queen; CSS; Clap Your Hands Say Yeah	Rodrigo Y Gabriela; Turin Brakes; Rickie Lee Jones	I'm from Barcelona; The Rumble Strips; Simple Kid	Dan Le Sac vs Scroobius Pip; Friendly Fires; Joe Lean And The Jing Jang Jong
Sunday 15 July	Arcade Fire; Jarvis Cocker; The Rapture	Gotan Project; Soulsavers; Gruff Rhys	Howling Bells; Final Fantasy; Euros Childs	Blood Red Shoes; The Hot Puppies; Breaking the Illusion

=== Other acts ===
Other acts appearing over the three days included the following:

- Au Revoir Simone
- Bill Bailey
- Bat for Lashes
- Lenny Beige
- The Book Club (with Robin Ince)
- Camera Obscura
- Alan Carr
- Cold War Kids
- Fancy Spaniels
- Halloween Film Society
- Arnab Chanda
- Russell Howard
- Phill Jupitus
- The Light Surgeons
- Lee Mack
- Scott Matthews
- Dylan Moran
- Carol Morley
- Kate Nash
- Seasick Steve
- Cherry Ghost
- Chris Shepherd
- Two Gallants

== Latitude Festival 2008 ==
The 2008 line up was announced on 19 March 2008 with Franz Ferdinand headlining on the Friday, Sigur Rós on the Saturday, and Interpol on the Sunday.

Day/arena	Obelisk Arena	Uncut Arena	Sunrise Arena	The Lake Stage
Friday 18 July	Franz Ferdinand; Death Cab for Cutie; The Go! Team; British Sea Power; Beth Orton; The Aliens; Murder by Death; Grammatics	Amadou et Mariam; Martha Wainwright; Julian Cope; Howling Bells; Black Kids; Gravenhurst; Heloise and the Savoir Faire	Crystal Castles; Rosie and the Goldbug; Clinic; Animal Kingdom; Slow Club; Broken Records; The Joy Formidable; Godwits	Errors; James Yuill; Johnny Foreigner; Gideon Conn; Jonquil; APAtT; Bearsuit; Derwyddon Dr Gonzo; Mathew Sawyer & The Ghosts; Kyte
Saturday 19 July	Sigur Rós; Elbow; Seasick Steve; dEUS; I Am Kloot; Ida Maria; Team Waterpolo; White Lies	The Mars Volta; Guillemots; House of Love; The Coral (acoustic set); Wild Beasts; Magistrates; Captain	Metronomy; Johnny Flynn; Anya Marina; Billy the Kid; The Locarnos; Wallis Bird; Nic Dawson Kelly	Cheeky cheeky and the nosebleeds; Sky Larkin; This City; The Voluntary Butler Scheme; The Kabeedies; Swanton Bombs; KateGoes; Truckers of Husk; The Beep Seals
Sunday 20 July	Interpol; Grinderman; The Breeders; Foals; Nada Surf; Fields; Joanna Newsom	Tindersticks; Blondie; Okkervil River; Glasvegas; Patrick Watson; Paul Heaton; Noah and the Whale; Those Dancing Days; The Satin Peaches; Sam Isaac	Black Lips; Lykke Li; Beggars; Thomas Tantrum; Hold Fire; Tallulah Rendall	The Wave Pictures; thecocknbullkid; Lovvers; Elle S'appelle; Rod Thomas; Tim and Sam's Tim and Sam Band; Island Line; A Line; The School

=== Other music acts due to appear ===
- The Exploits of Elaine (soundtracking Sarah Wood's film Book of Love)
- M.I.A. was scheduled to headline the Sunrise Arena on the Sunday but pulled out due to ill health.
- Ida Maria was scheduled to play on the main stage on Sunday but withdrew due to ill health.

=== Other artists ===
Comedy Arena acts included:

Friday - Andy Robinson, Robin Ince, Adam Bloom, Simon Day, Ben Norris, Marcus Brigstocke (standing in for Dave Fulton), Russell Howard, Daniel Rigby, Arnab Chanda, Ross Noble, Simon Evans, Lucy Porter, Phil Kay & Guilty Pleasures

Saturday - Stephen Grant, Dan Atkinson, Carey Marx, Tim Minchin, Scott Capurro, Jon Richardson, Bill Bailey, Jason Wood, Michael Fabbri, Jeremy Hardy, Miles Jupp, Rich Hall & Guilty Pleasures

Sunday - Rufus Hound, Russell Kane, Phill Jupitus, Steve Weiner, Andrew Lawrence, Frankie Boyle, Milton Jones, Lee Mack, Otis Lee Crenshaw, Stewart Lee, Hans Teeuwen, Omid Djalili & Swap-a-Rama

Film Arena appearances included:

Barry Adamson, George Pringle, Halloween Film Festival, Chris Shepherd, Their Hearts Were Full of Spring and Grind A Go-Go from 'Oh My God! I Miss You...'

In the Woods appearances:

Dirty Protest Theatre

== Latitude Festival 2009 ==
The fourth edition took place on 16–19 July 2009. Acts that played include Nick Cave and the Bad Seeds, Thom Yorke, Grace Jones and Pet Shop Boys as the main headliners, alongside Editors, Doves, and Bat for Lashes. The headliners and ticket details were announced on the Latitude Festival official site on 23 March 2009, at 7pm and sold out near to the event. More acts were confirmed at around 12:00 pm on the following day. These acts had already been previously reported on BBC Radio 1, but denied by festival organisers. Also announced in the press were The Gossip. On 3 April 2009 the official Latitude website confirmed Magazine, Spiritualized and Newton Faulkner to be playing. In June, it was announced that Thom Yorke would play an exclusive solo set as the festival's special guest (a role taken by Joanna Newsom in 2008).

BBC Radio covered the four day event with live music, comedy, sessions and interviews featured in shows across Radio 2, Radio 4, 6 Music and BBC Suffolk.

The total attendance for the weekend was 25,000.

Day/arena	Obelisk Arena	Uncut Arena	Sunrise Arena	The Lake Stage
Friday 17 July	Pet Shop Boys; Regina Spektor; The Pretenders; Ladyhawke; Of Montreal; The Broken Family Band; Amazing Baby; Flashguns	Bat for Lashes; Squeeze; Mew; Lykke Li; Fever Ray; The Duckworth Lewis Method; The Temper Trap; Chairlift; The Mummers; Teitur	Little Boots; Kap Bambino; Local Natives; Charlotte Hatherley; Goldheart Assembly; 1990s; Black Joe Lewis; Kurran and the Wolfnotes; Juliette Commagere; Jonathan Jeremiah	Golden Silvers; We Have Band; Post War Years; Speech Debelle; Chew Lips; Bishi; Dag for Dag; The Agitator; The Late Greats
Saturday 18 July	Grace Jones; Doves; White Lies; Patrick Wolf; Broken Records; The Airborne Toxic Event; Datarock; The Chakras	Spiritualized; Newton Faulkner; Camera Obscura; Scott Matthews; Emmy the Great; Mika; Paloma Faith; St. Vincent; Marnie Stern; White Belt Yellow Tag; Wildbirds & Peacedrums	Passion Pit; Maps; Skint & Demoralised; Animal Kingdom; Band of Skulls; Yes, Giantess; Dear Reader; Alan Pownall	Bombay Bicycle Club; Little Comets; The XX; Pulled Apart By Horses; Django Django; Joe Gideon & The Shark; 2 Hot 2 Sweat; The Cheek
Sunday 19 July	Nick Cave and The Bad Seeds; Editors; Phoenix; The Gaslight Anthem; The Rumble Strips; Lisa Hannigan; Wild Beasts; Sound of Guns; Thom Yorke	The Gossip; Magazine; Saint Etienne; Tricky; iLiKETRAiNS; The Invisible; Hjaltalin	!!!; 65 Days of Static; Mirrors; Sky Larkin; Villagers; Asaf Avidan and the Mojos; Fight Like Apes; Sugar Crisis; Catherine A.D.; First Aid Kit	Slow Club; Casiokids; Marina and the Diamonds; Not Squares

The poetry arena included performances from Andrew Motion, Brian Patten, Roger Lloyd-Pack (performing T. S. Eliot's The Waste Land), Jackie Kay, Simon Armitage and Jeffrey Lewis; The Comedy Arena featured Jo Brand, Ed Byrne, Mark Thomas, Sean Lock, Adam Hills, Sean Hughes and Dave Gorman; The Theatre Arena showcased Royal Shakespeare Company, National Theatre, Bush Theatre and Paines Plough; The Literary Arena presented Blake Morrison, Jonathan Coe, Mark Steel, Vivienne Westwood, Sir Peter Blake, Frank Skinner and Luke Haines.

== Latitude Festival 2010 ==
Latitude 2010 (the fifth edition) took place on 15, 16, 17 and 18 July 2010. Initial lineup announcements were made at 7pm on Tuesday 9 March 2010. Capacity for the event was increased substantially to 35,000.

Obelisk Arena
Friday	Saturday	Sunday
Florence and the Machine; Empire of the Sun; Laura Marling; Spoon; Hockey; The Unthanks; Here We Go Magic; Kassidy	Belle & Sebastian; Crystal Castles; The Maccabees; James; Frank Turner; Corinne Bailey Rae; John Grant; Race Horses	Vampire Weekend; Rodrigo y Gabriela; The Temper Trap; Midlake; Dirty Projectors; Mumford & Sons; Sweet Billy Pilgrim; The Strange Boys; Tom Jones

The Word Arena
Friday	Saturday	Sunday
The National; Richard Hawley; Wild Beasts; The Feeling; Angus & Julia Stone; Black Mountain; Villagers; The Kissaway Trail; Jonathan Jeremiah	The xx The Horrors; Noah and the Whale; David Ford; Frightened Rabbit; Paul Heaton; School of Seven Bells; Joshua Radin; Chief	Grizzly Bear; Jónsi; The Coral; Charlotte Gainsbourg; Yeasayer; Kristin Hersh; The Big Pink; Jamie Lidell; The Antlers; Rox

Sunrise Arena
Friday	Saturday	Sunday
Girls; Tokyo Police Club; Luna Belle; Arno Carstens; I Blame Coco; Lissie; The Middle East; Holly Miranda; Delta Maid; Kurran and the Wolfnotes; Matthew P	Archie Bronson Outfit; First Aid Kit; Lonelady; The Lost Levels; Lauren Pritchard; O Children; White Belt Yellow Tag; The Hundred in the Hands; Michael Kiwanuka; Lupen Crook; Active Child	Darwin Deez; The Pains of Being Pure at Heart; These New Puritans; Morning Parade; Jesca Hoop; Egyptian Hip Hop; Joe Worricker; Nadine Shah; The Liberty Vessels

The Lake Stage
Friday	Saturday	Sunday
Everything Everything; Islet; Engine Earz Experiment; Esben and the Witch; The Good Natured; Yuck; Y Niwl; Rose Elinor Dougall; These Ghosts; Aaron Wright	Frankie & the Heartstrings; Teeth; Nedry; Zun Zun Egui; Sweet Baboo; Standard Fare; Boycott Monday; The Supernovas; Clare Maguire; The Cads	Beth Jeans Houghton; Tom Williams & The Boat; Kelpe; Wilder; Mitchell Museum; Spectrals; The Quails; Cevanne Horrocks-Hopayian

=== Security at Latitude 2010 ===
There was a reported gang rape on the first night of the festival which resulted in a heavy police presence for the remainder of the festival, including posters and flyers being handed out. Crystal Castles criticised the rapists during their performance on the Main Stage, calling the perpetrators "disgusting". A second rape was reported to have occurred on the second night though it attracted much less publicity than the first. Women were advised against going anywhere on site unaccompanied.

== Latitude Festival 2011 ==
Latitude 2011 (the sixth edition) took place on 14–17 July 2011. The first line up announcements were revealed on 14 March 2011. The three Obelisk headliners were revealed as well as a number of other artists and acts appearing across all stages.

Obelisk Arena
Friday	Saturday	Sunday
The National; Paloma Faith; Bright Eyes; KT Tunstall; Isobel Campbell and Mark Lanegan; Wanda Jackson; Edwyn Collins	Paolo Nutini; My Morning Jacket; The Cribs; Seasick Steve; Rumer; They Might Be Giants; Ed Sheeran	Suede; Hurts; Glasvegas; Iron and Wine; The Waterboys; Kele; Anna Calvi; Scala & Kolacny Brothers

The Word Arena
Friday	Saturday	Sunday
Bombay Bicycle Club; The Vaccines; Lyle Lovett and his Acoustic Group; Caribou; Deerhunter; Yann Tiersen; Chapel Club; The Duke and The King; Avi Buffalo	Foals; Echo and the Bunnymen; I Am Kloot; Bellowhead; British Sea Power; The Walkmen; Villagers; Adam Ant	Eels; Lykke Li; OMD; Everything Everything; Os Mutantes; The Naked and Famous; Carl Barat; The Leisure Society

Sunrise Arena
Friday	Saturday	Sunday
Cat's Eyes; Jenny and Johnny; Glasser; Cloud Control; Esben and the Witch; Crocodiles; Grouplove; Fool's Gold; The Phantom Band; Ben Howard; Safari; Our Fold; Braids	Steve Mason; Thea Gilmore; C. W. Stoneking; Fight Like Apes; The Head and the Heart; Trophy Wife; Dog Is Dead; Dionne Bromfield; Tripwires; Yellowire; Phildel; The Raghu Dixit Project; Man Made	Crystal Fighters; Gold Panda; Foster the People; The Bees; Caitlin Rose; Oh Land; The Heartbreaks; Marques Toliver; When Saints Go Machine; Treefight for Sunlight; Aaron Wright and the Aprils

The Lake Stage
Friday	Saturday	Sunday
Dutch Uncles; Admiral Fallow; Jonny; Still Corners; Various Cruelties; The Gentle Good; Brown Brogues; James Spankie; Gary Knock; Goldierocks	CocknBullKid; Tribes; Dels; Spector; Y Niwl; Fiction; Cerebral Ballzy; The B. Goodes; Gabriella Noble	James Blake; Dry the River; Fixers; Mazes; Ghostpoet; Clock Opera; Gwilym Gold; Sea of Bees; These Are End Times; Friends Electric

== Latitude Festival 2012 ==
Latitude 2012 (the seventh edition) took place on 12–15 July 2012. The first line up announcements were revealed on 5 March 2012. The three Obelisk headliners were revealed alongside the three Word Arena headliners, as well as a number of other artists and acts appearing across all stages. What was previously known as the 'Sunrise Arena' was changed to the 'i Arena'.

Obelisk Arena
Friday	Saturday	Sunday
Bon Iver; Metronomy; Janelle Monáe; Amadou & Mariam; Glen Hansard; First Aid Kit; Punch Brothers; Givers	Elbow; Laura Marling; Richard Hawley; Michael Kiwanuka; Esperanza Spalding; Baxter Dury; Mick Flannery; Sissy & the Blisters	Paul Weller; Ben Howard; Bat for Lashes; Simple Minds; Edward Sharpe and the Magnetic Zeros; Alabama Shakes; Rufus Wainwright

Word Arena
Friday	Saturday	Sunday
White Lies; Yeasayer; Lana Del Rey; Dexys Midnight Runners; The Antlers; The War on Drugs; Destroyer; Fatoumata Diawara; Lloyd Cole; The Silver Seas	The Horrors; SBTRKT; Deus; Low; Daryl Hall; Josh T Pearson; Lianne La Havas; Smoke Fairies; Sharon Van Etten	Wild Beasts; Buena Vista Social Club; M83; Battles; St. Vincent; Thomas Dolby; Jonathan Wilson; Gabriel Bruce

The i Arena
Friday	Saturday	Sunday
Tune-Yards; Kurt Vile; Howler; Dawes; Chairlift; Twin Shadow; Kindness; Foy Vance; Cold Specks; Breton; Iceage; The Field	Zola Jesus; Django Django; SoKo; I Break Horses; The Staves; Wooden Shjips; Of Monsters and Men; Team Me; Deap Vally; Sunless '97; Splashh; The Rumour Said Fire; Bwani Junction; Walls	Perfume Genius; Slow Club; Other Lives; King Charles; We Are Augustines; Daughter; Zun Zun Egui; Liz Green; Francois & the Atlas Mountains; Catherine Ad; Apparat

The Lake Stage
Friday	Saturday	Sunday
Clock Opera; Alt-J (∆); Seye; Vadoinmessico; Poliça; Revere; We Have Band; Cate Le Bon; Tim Ten Yen; The Soft	Los Campesinos! Toy; The Crookes; Kwes; Tall Ships; Theme Park; Paul Thomas Saunders; Sam Airey; Dingus Khan	Herman Düne; Lucy Rose; NZCA/Lines; Weird Dreams; Hooray for Earth; The Cast of Cheers; Peace; Gross Magic; Benjamin Bloom

Other artists who performed over the weekend include George Fitzgerald, Mosca, Shy FX, Skittles, Tuesday Born, and Lang Lang.

== Latitude Festival 2013 ==
Latitude 2013 (the eighth edition) took place on 18–21 July. The first acts were revealed on 19 March 2013. What was previously known as the Word Arena had its official name changed to the BBC Radio 6 Music Stage. A brand new music stage was introduced for 2013, The Alcove Stage, which showcased upcoming acts with many of the artists coming from the local area.

Obelisk Arena
Friday	Saturday	Sunday
Bloc Party; The Maccabees; Cat Power; Yo La Tengo; I Am Kloot; Stornoway; Tim Burgess; The Leisure Society	Kraftwerk; Hot Chip; Yeah Yeah Yeahs; Jessie Ware; Steve Mason; Efterklang; Bassekou Kouyate & Ngoni Ba; Steve Mason; Charles Bradley & His Extraordinaires	Foals; Grizzly Bear; Local Natives; James Blake; The Tallest Man on Earth; Junip; Bobby Womack

The BBC Radio 6 Music Stage
Friday	Saturday	Sunday
Texas; Calexico; Villagers; Richard Thompson Electric Trio; Beth Orton; John Grant; Akron/Family; Willy Mason; James Skelly & the Intenders; Theme Park	Alt-J; Richard Ashcroft; Mark Lanegan Band; Everything Everything; Daughter; White Denim; King Charles; Matthew E. White; Gaz Coombes	Beach House; Disclosure; Rudimental; Cocorosie; Iamamiwhoami; Austra; Múm; Laura Mvula

The i Arena
Friday	Saturday	Sunday
Japandroids; DIIV; Widowspeak; Rachel Zeffira; Chvrches sohn Deptford Goth; Malcolm Middleton; Mikhael Paskalev; Young Wonder; Nick Mulvey; Naomi Keyte	Purity Ring; Rhye; Dark Dark Dark; Half Moon Run; Torres; Matt Corby; King Creosote; Wave Machines; Serafina Steer; Josephine; Drenge; The Bots; Thomas Dybdahl	Moon Duo; Tamikrest; Friends; Stealing Sheep; Sinkane; Fimber Bravo; Temples; James Yorkston; Hookworms; Money

The Lake Stage
Friday	Saturday	Sunday
Benjamin Francis Leftwich; MØ; Teleman; Sweet Baboo; Wolf Alice; Joe Banfi; Coves; To Be Frank	Veronica Falls; Gabriel Bruce; Jagwar Ma; Retro Stefson; Clean Bandit; Night Engine; Bo Ningen; Joanna Gruesome; Flamingods; Port Isla	Sam Smith; The 1975; Swim Deep; Dan Croll; Amateur Best; Valerie June; Georgia Ruth; Plaitum

Also performing or DJing over the weekend included Abi Uttley, Anushka, Benin City, Bipolar Sunshine, The Busy Twist, Catfish and the Bottlemen, Chloe Howl, Dems, Duologue, The Establishment, The Family Rain, Gamu, Hero Fisher, Kins, Lizzie Bellamy, Lorca, Maglia Rosa Group, Marques Toliver, Milo Greene, MT Wolf, Mungo's Hi Fi, Ossie, Romare, Roy Davis Jr., Ruen Brothers, Shox, Sivu, Superfood, Syd Arthur, Tuesday Born, Werkha, Zed Bias, and Josh Record.

== Latitude Festival 2014 ==
Latitude 2014 (the ninth edition) took place on 17–20 July. The first acts were revealed on 11 December 2013. The first headliner announced for the festival was going to be Two Door Cinema Club, but after singer Alex Trimble fell ill, Lily Allen headlined the Friday night. On 20 January Damon Albarn was announced as the festival's second headliner via Twitter. The third headliners announced were The Black Keys. Other acts who performed across the festival included Röyksopp, Robyn, Haim, Billy Bragg, Bombay Bicycle Club, Tame Impala, Slowdive, Hall & Oates, First Aid Kit, Booker T. Jones, Anna Calvi, Phosphorescent, Nils Frahm, Goat, Cass McCombs, Willis Earl Beal, Marika Hackman, San Fermin, Son Lux and Josephine Foster.

Obelisk Arena
Friday	Saturday	Sunday
Lily Allen; Editors; Rudimental (surprise act); Crystal Fighters; Kelis; Billy Bragg; Paul Heaton & Jacqui Abbott; Slow Club	Damon Albarn; Bombay Bicycle Club; First Aid Kit; The Afghan Whigs; Booker T. Jones; Tinariwen; Ibibio sound machine	The Black Keys; Tame Impala; Haim; Chrissie Hynde; The Jayhawks; Phosphoresent

The BBC Radio 6 Music Stage
Friday	Saturday	Sunday
Mogwai; Slowdive; Anna Calvi; Goat; Temples; Sohn; Ásgeir; Hozier; Jimi Goodwin; San Fermin	Röyksopp & Robyn; James Vincent McMorrow; Daryl Hall and John Oates; Jungle; Conor Oberst; Agnes Obel; Damien Jurado; Dawes	Lykke Li; Clean Bandit; The War on Drugs; Augustines; Parquet Courts; Archie Bronson Outfit; George Ezra; Valerie June; James (due to perform on Obelisk on Saturday but postponed due to travel issues)

Headliners from the i Arena included:

James Holden (Live)
Young Fathers
Future Islands
Nils Frahm

Headliners from the Lake stage included:

Bondax
Cate Le Bon
Catfish and the Bottlemen
Luke Sital-Singh

== Latitude Festival 2015 ==
Latitude 2015 took place on Thursday 16 - Sunday 19 July. The initial lineup was announced on 10 March and included headliners alt-J, Portishead, and Noel Gallagher's High Flying Birds.

Obelisk Arena
Friday	Saturday	Sunday
alt-J; Caribou; Wild Beasts; Santigold; Femi Kuti & the Positive Force; Nitin Sawhney; Summer Camp	Portishead; James Blake; Laura Marling; Lianne La Havas; José González; Badly Drawn Boy; Benjamin Booker; JP Cooper	Noel Gallagher's High Flying Birds; Manic Street Preachers; Warpaint; Seasick Steve; The Boomtown Rats; Naomi Shelton and the Gospel Queens; Gareth Malone

The BBC Radio 6 Music Stage
Friday	Saturday	Sunday
Jon Hopkins; Django Django; Public Service Broadcasting; Toro y Moi; King Creosote; Unknown Mortal Orchestra; Black Rivers; The Districts; SOAK	The Vaccines; Catfish and the Bottlemen; Savages; The Charlatans; Wolf Alice; Sun Kil Moon; The Thurston Moore Band; Drenge; Tom Robinson	SBTRKT; La Roux; Years & Years; Young Fathers; Kwabs; Kindness; A Winged Victory for the Sullen

The i Arena
Friday	Saturday	Sunday
Bill Wells & Aidan Moffat; The Pains of Being Pure at Heart; Ezra Furman; Songhoy Blues; King Gizzard & the Lizard Wizard; Curtis Harding; Timber Timbre; Dolores Haze; Ed Sheeran (surprise act)	Clark; Kiasmos; Grandbrothers; Ibeyi; Leon Bridges; The Twilight Sad; Marika Hackman; Nadine Shah; Ben Khan; Haelos; Izzy Bizu	The 2 Bears; Zola Jesus; Adult Jazz; Jack Garratt; Shura; Susanne Sundfør; DM Stith; Admiral Fallow; Duke Garwood

The Lake Stage
Friday	Saturday	Sunday
To Kill a King; Formation; Outfit; Sundara Karma; Man Made; Honne; Clarence Clarity	Prides; Pretty Vicious; Oscar; Petite Meller; Boxed In; Denai Moore; Clare Maguire; Neon Waltz	Rae Morris; Gulf; Aquilo; Eaves; Charlie Cunningham; Gwenno

== Latitude Festival 2016 ==
Latitude 2016 took place on Thursday 14 - Sunday 17 July. The initial lineup was announced on 3 March and included headliners The Maccabees, The National and New Order. The National became the first band to headline the festival twice.

Obelisk Arena
Friday	Saturday	Sunday
The Maccabees; Beirut; Father John Misty; Courtney Barnett; British Sea Power; Bears Den; Junun Feat. Shye Ben Tzur & The Rajasthan Express; Emmy the Great	The National; Chvrches; John Grant; Daughter; Squeeze; Nathaniel Rateliff & the Night Sweats; Sturgill Simpson; Alif	New Order; M83; The Lumineers; Chet Faker; Laura Mvula; Michael Kiwanuka; Sidestepper; 100 Voices of Gospel

The BBC Radio 6 Music Stage
Friday	Saturday	Sunday
Grimes; Slaves; Augustines; Christine and the Queens; Perfume Genius; Oh Wonder; Låpsley; Honne; Phoria	Soulwax; Kurt Vile and the Violators; Half Moon Run; Poliça; Frightened Rabbit; Ratboy; Steve Mason; DMA's; Lucius	Of Monsters and Men; Miike Snow; MØ; Roots Manuva; Mura Masa; Jamie Woon; Aurora; Foy Vance; Minor Victories

== Latitude Festival 2017 ==
Latitude 2017 took place on Thursday 13 - Sunday 16 July. It included a Gentlemen of the Road takeover curated by Mumford & Sons on the Saturday.

Obelisk Arena
Friday	Saturday	Sunday
The 1975; Goldfrapp; The Horrors; Tinariwen; Mystery Jets; The Coral; Pumarosa	Mumford & Sons; Leon Bridges; Two Door Cinema Club (special guests); Glass Animals; Milky Chance; Lucy Rose; The Very Best	Fleet Foxes; John Cale; The Divine Comedy; Public Service Broadcasting; Mavis Staples; Ward Thomas; Baloji

The BBC Radio 6 Music Stage
Friday	Saturday	Sunday
Placebo; Ride; The Head and the Heart; Beth Orton; The Radio Dept. The Japanese House; Formation; Julia Jacklin	Jack Garratt; Sohn; A Blaze Of Feather; The Lemon Twigs; Maggie Rogers; Declan McKenna; Karen Elson; Skott	Fatboy Slim; Loyle Carner; Mount Kimbie; The Jesus and Mary Chain; Kaleo; Ibibio Sound Machine; Lisa Hannigan; Tom Grennan

== Latitude Festival 2018 ==
Latitude 2018 took place on 12–15 July. The lineup was announced on 12 February 2018 with Solange, The Killers and alt-J as headliners. There was also a surprise set from Liam Gallagher on the Saturday in the BBC Music Arena.

Obelisk Arena
Friday	Saturday	Sunday
Solange; Belle & Sebastian; The Charlatans; Benjamin Clementine; Gang of Youths; La Femme; The Go! Team	The Killers; The Vaccines; Jessie Ware; Parquet Courts; Alex Cameron; Hudson Taylor; Juanita Stein	alt-J; Wolf Alice; Rag'n'Bone Man; Sleeper; Fickle Friends; Jeremy Loops; Black Honey

BBC Music Arena
Friday	Saturday	Sunday
James; Tune-Yards; Nao...And You Will Know Us by the Trail of Dead; Hinds; Marlon Williams; Deap Vally	Mogwai; The Breeders; Liam Gallagher (surprise set); Alvvays; Ibeyi; Jacob Banks; Pop Chorus	Jon Hopkins; Gabrielle Aplin; Bomba Estéro; IDLES; Superorganism; MNEK; Hannah Peel

== Latitude Festival 2019 ==
Latitude 2019 took place from 18 to 21 July. The first part of the lineup was announced on 24 January. The Friday was headlined by George Ezra and Sunday by Lana Del Rey. Snow Patrol were initially announced to headline the Saturday but pulled out due to injury and were replaced by Stereophonics. Other acts on the bill included Underworld, Loyle Carner, CHVRCHES, Neneh Cherry, Sigrid, Primal Scream, Everything Everything, Slaves, Marina and MØ.

Obelisk Arena
Friday	Saturday	Sunday
George Ezra; Loyle Carner; Neneh Cherry; Khruangbin; Anna Calvi; Baxter Dury; KOKOKO!	Stereophonics; Underworld (Special Closing Set); Tom Grennan; Marina; Walking on Cars; The Futureheads (performance cancelled due to storm); Honeyblood	Lana Del Rey; CHVRCHES; Sigrid; Cat Power; Pale Waves; Palace; The Kingdom Choir

BBC Sounds Stage
Friday	Saturday	Sunday
Primal Scream; Gomez; Freya Ridings; Parcels; Jenny Lewis; Jonathan Wilson; Kero Kero Bonito	Everything Everything; MØ; Aurora; The Twilight Sad; The Magic Gang; Nadine Shah; Grace Carter; Pop Chorus	Slaves; LP; Rolling Blackouts Coastal Fever; Julia Jacklin; Sons of Kemet; The Big Moon; Let's Eat Grandma

== Latitude Festival 2020 ==
The 2020 edition was planned to have taken place from Thursday 16 - Sunday 19 July 2020. It was due to have been headlined by Haim, Liam Gallagher and The Chemical Brothers. On 27 April the 2020 festival was cancelled due to the COVID-19 pandemic. The lineup would have been as follows:

Obelisk Arena
Friday	Saturday	Sunday
Haim; Michael Kiwanuka; Mahalia; Local Natives; City and Colour; Nadia Rose; Ibibio Sound Machine	Liam Gallagher; The Lumineers; James Vincent McMorrow; Tove Lo; Les Amazones d'Afrique; Kawala; Girl Ray	The Chemical Brothers; Keane; N/A; Celeste; Black Pumas; The Futurehads; Snow Patrol Reworked

BBC Sounds Stage
Friday	Saturday	Sunday
King Gizzard and the Lizard Wizard; La Roux; Phoebe Bridgers; Nubya Garcia; Cate Le Bon; Stella Donnelly; Pat Thomas & Kwashibu Area Band; Big Joanie	Charli XCX; Purity Ring; Kae Tempest; Joy Crookes; Inhaler; Oscar Jerome; Velvet Negroni; King Kong Company	N/A; Banks; Rina Sawayama; Marika Hackman; Anna Meredeth; The Beths; Annabel Allum

== Latitude Festival 2021 ==
Following the 2020 cancellation, the festivals 15th edition took place from 22 to 25 July 2021. It went ahead as a government backed test event for holding live events during the COVID-19 Pandemic. Friday was headlined by Wolf Alice, Saturday by The Chemical Brothers and Sunday co-headlined by Bastille and Bombay Bicycle Club. Other acts on the lineup included Kaiser Chiefs, Supergrass, Mabel, Rick Astley and Hot Chip. There were however some acts who had to withdraw from the festival due to Covid cases such as Fontaines DC, Arlo Parks, Alfie Templeman and Billie Marten

Obelisk Arena
Friday	Saturday	Sunday
Wolf Alice; Mabel; Declan McKenna; Beebadoobee; Maisie Peters; JC Stewart; Lynks	The Chemical Brothers; Rudimental; Sea Girls; Nadia Rose; Kawala; Sports Team; Supergrass (special guests)	Bastille Reorchestrated; Bombay Bicycle Club; Kaiser Chiefs; James Vincent McMorrow; Rick Astley; Griff; Self Esteem; Bill Bailey (special guest)

BBC Sounds Stage
Friday	Saturday	Sunday
Hot Chip; Squid; The Staves; Akala; Dream Wife; Willie J Healey; Lucia & The Best Boys; Mr Jukes and Barney Artist	Sleaford Mods; Villagers; Holly Humberstone; Lava La Rue; LYRA; Los Bitchos; The Longest Johns	Sons of Kemet; Shame; Nubya Garcia; Priya Ragu; Anna Meredith; The Vaccines (surprise set); Tim Burgess; Big Joanie

== Latitude Festival 2022 ==
The festivals 16th edition took place from 21 to 24 July 2022. Lewis Capaldi was headliner on the Friday, Foals on the Saturday and Snow Patrol on the Sunday.

Obelisk Arena
Friday	Saturday	Sunday
Lewis Capaldi; Maggie Rogers; Modest Mouse; Rina Sawayama; Mdou Moctar; Billie Marten; Alfie Templeman; Larkin Poe	Foals; Little Simz; Example; Los Bitchos; Sea Power; Shed Seven	Snow Patrol; Manic Street Preachers; Freya Ridings; Mark Owen; Rumer; Tribes; Dylan; Ed Sheeran (guest appearance with Snow Patrol)

BBC Sounds Stage
Friday	Saturday	Sunday
Phoebe Bridgers; Caroline Polachek; Self Esteem; Maxïmo Park; Akala; Porridge Radio; Gaffa Tape Sandy; Mickey Callisto	Groove Armada; Mahalia; Cavetown; The Shires; Katy J Pearson; Curtis Harding; Bessie Turner; Tamzene	Fontaines DC; The Afghan Whigs; Kae Tempest; Nilüfur Yanya; Crows; Joe Armon-Jones; JP Saxe; JOHN

== Latitude Festival 2023 ==
Organisers have confirmed the 17th edition took place from the 20 to 23 July 2023. The three headliners were confirmed as Pulp, Paolo Nutini and George Ezra Yard Act, Young Fathers and Siouxsie headlined the BBC Sounds Stage.

Obelisk Arena
Friday	Saturday	Sunday
Pulp; Metronomy; Confidence Man; Georgia; N'Famady Kouyaté; Tinariwen	Paolo Nutini; The Kooks; Paul Heaton; The Big Moon; The Lightning Seeds; Teddy Swims; The Mysterines	George Ezra; Mimi Webb; The Proclaimers; Sophie Ellis-Bextor; The Bootleg Beatles; Picture This; James

BBC Sounds Stage
Friday	Saturday	Sunday
Yard Act; Men I Trust; Dry Cleaning; The Murder Capital; The Beths; Do Nothing; Ber	Young Fathers; Far From Saints; Don Letts; Rachel Chinouriri flowerovlove Oscar Lang; Kai Bosch	Siouxsie; Black Midi; Kiefer Sutherland; Creep Show; Gwenno; Caity Baser; Lyr

Comedy Arena
Friday	Saturday	Sunday
Ed Gamble	Bridget Christie; Shaparak Khorsandi; Suzi Ruffell; Michelle De Swarte	Romesh Ranganathan; Gimme Gimme Gimme ABBA After Midnight

== Latitude Festival 2024 ==
The 18th edition was held 25–28 July 2024. The headliners were Duran Duran, London Grammar, Keane and Kasabian Future Islands, Orbital and Lankum headlined the Second Stage (BBC Sounds).

Obelisk Arena
Friday	Saturday	Sunday
Kasabian; Khruangbin; The Vaccines; Caity Baser; Waxahatchee; Frank Turner and the Sleeping Souls; Witch	London Grammar; Keane; Rick Astley; CMAT; Reverend & the Makers; Seasick Steve; Nerina Pallot	Duran Duran; Nile Rodgers & Chic; Rag 'N' Bone Man; The Darkness; Baby Queen; The Lottery Winners; Sam Lee; Alexis Ffrench

Second Stage (BBC Sounds)
Friday	Saturday	Sunday
Future Islands; Alison Goldfrapp; Corinne Bailey Rae; BC Camplight; Pip Blom; Damian Lewis; Swim Deep; Blusher	Orbital; Jockstrap; The Mary Wallopers; Blanco White; Richy Mitch and the Coal Miners; Anthony Szmierek; Myles Smith	Lankum; Ash; David Duchovny; Marika Hackman; Been Stellar; Big Special

== Latitude Festival 2025 ==
The 19th edition took place from 24–27 July.

Obelisk Arena
Friday	Saturday	Sunday
Sting; Basement Jaxx; Maribou State; Billy Bragg; Scouting for Girls; Matilda Mann	Fatboy Slim; Kaiser Chiefs; Clean Bandit; Example; Kingfishr; Jade Bird; MRCY	Snow Patrol; Elbow; Mika; Alison Moyet; Infinity Song; Una Noche En La Habana; Gareth Malone

Second Stage (BBC Sounds)
Friday	Saturday	Sunday
Singer; Feeder; Sprints; The Royston Club; The Kiffness; Remember Monday; Midnight Generation; Azamiah	Leon Bridges; Public Service Broadcasting; Amble; Arthur Hill; Sorry; Nofun! Ben Ellis	Air; Doves; Palace; Pale Waves; Låpsley; The War and Treaty; Hamish Hawk; Son Mieux

== Latitude Festival 2026 ==
The 20th edition took place from 23 to 26 July 2026 at Henham Park in Suffolk.The festival's 20th edition featured headliners including David Byrne, Teddy Swims and Lewis Capaldi.

Obelisk Arena
Friday	Saturday	Sunday
David Byrne; The Last Dinner Party; Jalen Ngonda; Dry Cleaning; Alice Phoebe Lou; Diles Que No Me Maten; Gok Wan	Teddy Swims; Tom Odell; Billy Ocean; Vanessa Carlton; Cian Ducrot; Biird	Lewis Capaldi; Self Esteem; David Gray; Fabio & Grooverider and The Outlook Orchestra; The Undertones; Alex James' Britpop Classical

Second Stage (BBC Sounds)
Friday	Saturday	Sunday
Tom Grennan; Alessi Rose; Nathan Evans and the Saint Phnx Band; Florence Road; Lime Garden; Overpass	Wet Leg; The Beta Band; James Marriott; Just Mustard; Westside Cowboy; Temples; The Lilacs	The Flaming Lips; English Teacher; Saint Etienne; Peter Hook and the Light; Beth Orton; Panic Shack

== See also ==
- List of music festivals in the United Kingdom
