= Fractured Life =

Studio album by Air Traffic
- Released: 2 July 2007
- Recorded: August–September 2006; Rockfield Studio, Monmouth, Wales
- Genre: Alternative rock
- Length: 55:50
- Label: Tiny Consumer/EMI
- Producer: David Kosten

Singles from Fractured Life
- 1. "Just Abuse Me"/"Charlotte" Released: 17 July 2006; 2. "Charlotte" Released: 26 March 2007; 3. "Shooting Star" Released: 18 June 2007; 4. "No More Running Away" Released: 23 September 2007

Fractured Life is the debut album by English alternative rock band Air Traffic. It was released on 2 July 2007 on the Tiny Consumer label, an imprint of EMI. The album contains UK Top 40 hit "Charlotte" as well as other singles "Just Abuse Me", "Never Even Told Me Her Name", "Shooting Star" and, most recently, "No More Running Away". The album was released in America on 5 February 2008.

== Release ==
"Just Abuse Me" is the first single taken from the album. It was released as a double a-side with "Charlotte", a song which would later be re-released as a solo single. The vinyl was the 5th in a series of black and white 7-inch records released by Label Fandango, the independent record label from the creators of live music promotion company Club Fandango. It was described by the label as "Piano-led indie rock". The vinyl would lead to the band's major label signing, as following Zane Lowe playing "Just Abuse Me" on his BBC Radio 1 show, the band were signed to a long-term contract by EMI in May 2006.

"Just Abuse Me"/"Charlotte" was ineligible to chart in the UK Singles Chart as it was limited to 500 copies.

The track "Empty Space" was released as the iTunes free single of the week in the UK.

== Commercial performance and accolades ==
In the first week of its release, Fractured Life attained #42 on the UK Albums Chart. James Cannon, of Capital Radio, named the album "Album of the Week" for 2–9 July 2007. On 30 July 2007, the band re-released the album in a limited pressing 12 inch vinyl form.

The album was nominated for the 2008 XFM New Music Award, where the band played a special one-off performance at the ceremony at London's KOKO. The band was nominated for "Best International Newcomer" and "Best International Artist" at the 2007 and 2008 TMF Awards, respectively.

== Chart performance ==
Chart (2007–2008)	Peak position
Belgian Albums (Ultratop Flanders)	27
Dutch Albums (Album Top 100)	71
Scottish Albums (OCC)	64
UK Albums (OCC)	42

== Track listing ==
1. "Just Abuse Me" - 2:33
2. "Charlotte" - 2:24
3. "Shooting Star" - 4:08
4. "No More Running Away" - 4:23
5. "Empty Space" - 3:37
6. "Time Goes By" - 4:06
7. "I Like That" - 2:26
8. "Never Even Told Me Her Name" - 2:45
9. "Get In Line" - 2:07
10. "I Can't Understand" - 4:25
11. "Your Fractured Life" - 22:55
- Includes hidden track "Pee Wee Martini"

The Japanese release of Fractured Life includes bonus tracks "An End To All Our Problems" and "Left Out In The Rain", which are b-sides to former singles "Charlotte" and "Shooting Star" respectively. The US and German releases also included an extra track, "Come On." The track was released in the US and made available free to download from the band's website in the United Kingdom.
