= The Violet Hour (album) =

Studio album by the Clientele
- Released: 8 July 2003
- Recorded: 2002
- Studios: Medina Road (Finsbury Park, London, England)
- Genre: Indie pop
- Length: 49:49
- Labels: Merge; Pointy
- Producer: The Clientele

The Clientele chronology
Lost Weekend (2002)	The Violet Hour (2003)	Ariadne (2004)

Singles from The Violet Hour
- 1. "Haunted Melody" Released: October 2002; 2. "House on Fire" Released: June 2003

Professional ratings
Aggregate scores
Source	Rating
Metacritic	84/100
Review scores
Source	Rating
AllMusic	3.5/5 stars
Entertainment Weekly	B+
The Guardian	3/5 stars
NME	8/10
Pitchfork	8.7/10
Stylus Magazine	A
Uncut	4/5 stars

The Violet Hour is the second studio album by English indie pop band the Clientele. The album was released on 8 July 2003 by Merge Records and Pointy Records. It is the band's first proper full-length album composed primarily of new material.

"Haunted Melody" was released as a single in October 2002, backed with "Fear of Falling". "House on Fire" was released as a single in June 2003, backed with "Jamaican Rum Rhumba" (Take Two) and "Breathing Soft and Low".

The enhanced CD release of the album features two bonus videos for "House on Fire" and the track "Reflections After Jane" from Suburban Light.

== Track listing ==
All tracks are written by The Clientele (Alasdair MacLean, James Hornsey and Mark Keen), except where noted.

No.	Title	Writer(s)	Length
1.	"The Violet Hour"		4:55
2.	"Voices in the Mall"		2:09
3.	"When You and I Were Young"		3:50
4.	"Missing"		4:52
5.	"Jamaican Rum Rhumba"	Traditional	1:21
6.	"House on Fire"		4:24
7.	"Everybody's Gone"		3:02
8.	"Porcelain"		3:34
9.	"Haunted Melody"		2:14
10.	"Prelude"	Keen	2:21
11.	"Lamplight"		6:44
12.	"The House Always Wins"		8:02
13.	"Policeman Getting Lost"		2:21
Total length:			49:49

Enhanced CD bonus content
No.	Title	Length
1.	"Reflections After Jane" (bonus enhanced video)
2.	"House on Fire" (bonus enhanced video)

== Personnel ==
Credits for The Violet Hour adapted from album liner notes.

The Clientele

- Alasdair MacLean – vocals, guitar
- James Hornsey – bass
- Mark Keen – drums, piano

Production

- Mike Jones – engineering

Artwork and design

- Maxi del Campo – photography
- Michael Williams – photography
