= Bull & Gate =

Pub in Kentish Town, London

Coordinates: 51°33′06″N 0°08′30″W

The Bull & Gate
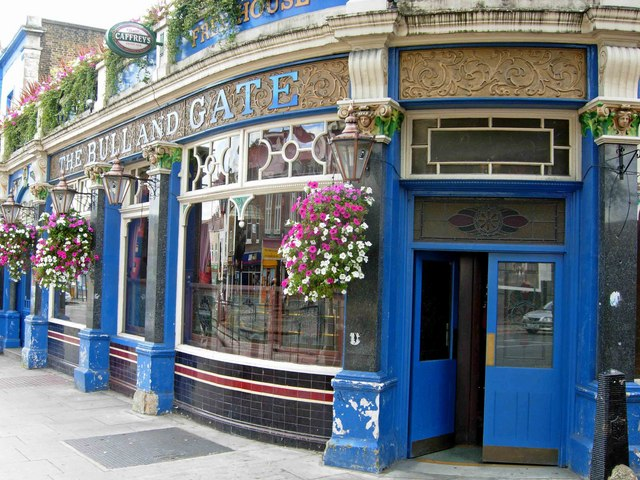
- Interactive map of the The Bull & Gate area

General information
- Location: 389 Kentish Town Rd, Kentish Town, London, NW5
- Opened: 1871
- Owner: Margaret and Pat Lynskey (1979 - 2013); Young's Brewery (2013 - present)

Design and construction
- Designations

Listed Building – Grade II
- Designated: 23 Aug 2005
- Reference no.: 1391501

The Bull & Gate is a Grade II listed public house and former music venue at 389 Kentish Town Road, Kentish Town, London. The pub had a long history as music venue, with bands such as The Pogues, Coldplay, Blur, and Suede playing there towards the start of their careers.

== History ==
It was built in 1871 on the site of a former inn called the Boulogne Gate named after Henry VIII's victory in France.

In 1979 Margaret and Pat Lynskey took over the pub.

In the 1980s the music events in the backroom, accessed via doors to the left of the pub's frontage, were run by promoter Jon Beast (who was also a warm-up act for Carter USM) who ran events under the name Timebox, and later as Hype! From then until the early 2000s the venue saw performances by acts such as Blur, Suede, My Bloody Valentine, Huggy Bear, Jesus Jones, Pop Will Eat Itself, Carter The Unstoppable Sex Machine, The Pogues, The Housemartins, PJ Harvey, Ash, The Darkness, The Libertines, Muse, Manic Street Preachers, Keane, and more.

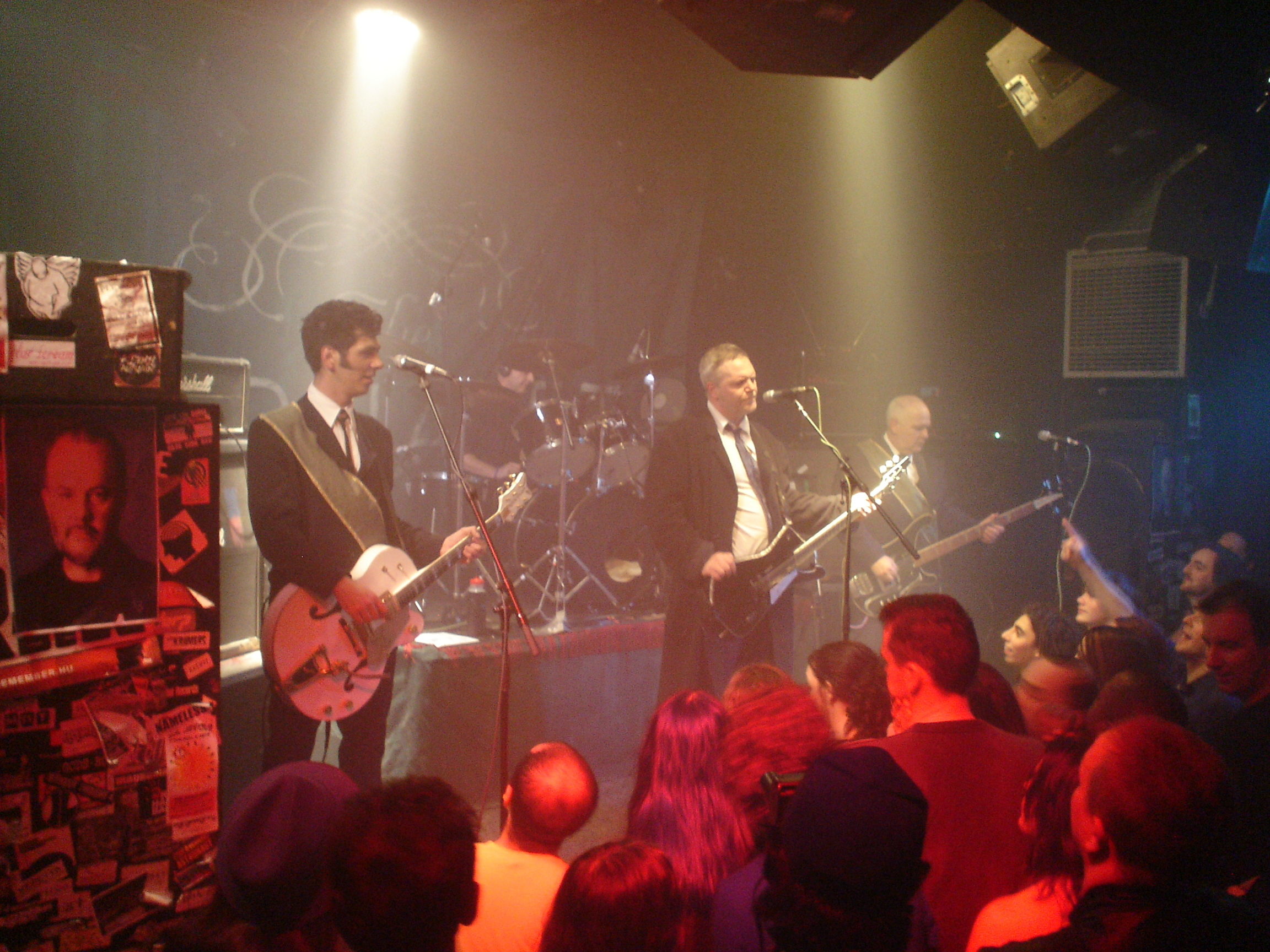

From 2010 to 2013 Club Fandango booked events at the pub. This was co-run by Simon Williams, co-founder of independent record label Fierce Panda Records, and Andy MacLeod, founder of Pointy Records.

It ceased operations as a venue in 2013, after being sold by previous owners to the Young's pub chain. As of 2020 an open kitchen now occupies the former stage area.

Some of the music video for the Taylor Swift song End Game was shot at the pub in October 2017.

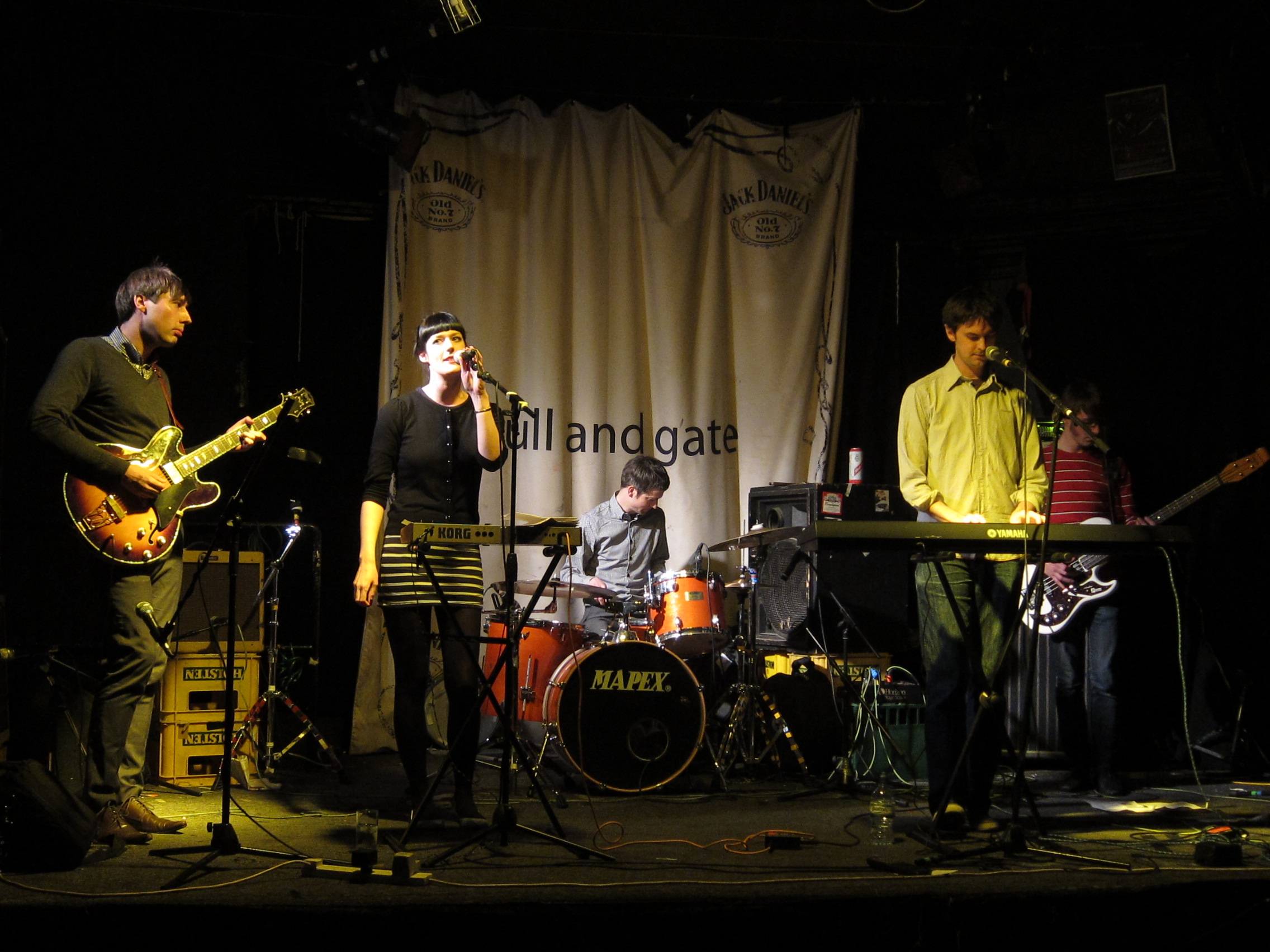
