= Bonfires on the Heath =

Studio album by the Clientele
- Released: 6 October 2009
- Recorded: December 2008 – April 2009
- Studios: Bart Studios (London, England)
- Genre: Indie pop
- Length: 41:43
- Labels: Merge; Pointy
- Producer: Brian O'Shaughnessy

The Clientele chronology
That Night a Forest Grew (2008)	Bonfires on the Heath (2009)	Minotaur (2010)

Bonfires on the Heath is the fifth studio album by English indie pop group the Clientele. The album was released on 6 October 2009 by Merge Records in the United States and on 16 November 2009 by Pointy Records in the United Kingdom.

A detail from Flora by the 16th century surrealistic painter Giuseppe Arcimboldo is used as the album's cover art.

== Critical reception ==
Professional ratings
Aggregate scores
Source	Rating
AnyDecentMusic?	7.4/10
Metacritic	81/100
Review scores
Source	Rating
AllMusic	5/5 stars
The A.V. Club	A−
Drowned in Sound	8/10
The Guardian	4/5 stars
Mojo	3/5 stars
Pitchfork	7.4/10
PopMatters	9/10
Q	4/5 stars
Spin	6/10
Uncut	4/5 stars

In a review of Bonfires on the Heath, AllMusic referred to the album as "the most perfect, autumnal, English pop record imaginable."

== Track listing ==
All tracks are written by The Clientele (Alasdair MacLean, James Hornsey, Mark Keen and Mel Draisey), except where noted.

No.	Title	Writer(s)	Length
1.	"I Wonder Who We Are"		4:25
2.	"Bonfires on the Heath"		5:11
3.	"Harvest Time"	The Clientele; Lupe Núñez-Fernández	3:50
4.	"Never Anyone but You"		5:31
5.	"Jennifer and Julia"		3:01
6.	"Sketch"		1:31
7.	"Tonight"	The Clientele; Emelie Berg	3:54
8.	"Share the Night"		3:19
9.	"I Know I Will See Your Face"		3:37
10.	"Three Month Summers"		2:44
11.	"Graven Wood"	The Clientele; Innes Phillips	3:02
12.	"Walking in the Park"		1:38
Total length:			41:43

== Personnel ==
Credits for Bonfires on the Heath adapted from album liner notes.

The Clientele

- Alasdair MacLean – vocals, whispering, acoustic guitar, slide guitar, Spanish guitar, Jazzmaster and Telecaster guitars
- James Hornsey – bass, backing vocals
- Mark Keen – drums, percussion, piano, backing vocals, trumpet arrangements
- Mel Draisey – violin, piano, Hammond organ, Rhodes piano, glockenspiel, backing vocals, string arrangements

Additional musicians

- Nikki Gleed – violin (1st)
- John Hoare – trumpet
- Brian O'Shaughnessy – electronic tambura
- Sarah Squires – violin (2nd)
- Hannah Stewart – cello
- Charlie Stock – viola

Production

- Jeff Lipton – mastering
- Brian O'Shaughnessy – production
- Maria Rice – mastering (assistant)

Artwork and design

- Maggie Fost – design
- Giuseppe Arcimboldo – artwork
- Federico Vinciolo – artwork

== Charts ==
Chart (2009)	Peak position
US Heatseekers Albums (Billboard)	26
