= Strange Geometry =

Studio album by the Clientele
- Released: 29 August 2005
- Recorded: March 2005
- Studios: Bark Studio (Walthamstow, London)
- Genre: Indie rock
- Length: 41:48
- Labels: Merge; Pointy
- Producer: Brian O'Shaughnessy

The Clientele chronology
Ariadne (2004)	Strange Geometry (2005)	It's Art, Dad (2005)

Singles from Strange Geometry
- 1. "Since K Got Over Me" Released: 22 August 2005

Professional ratings
Aggregate scores
Source	Rating
Metacritic	79/100
Review scores
Source	Rating
AllMusic	4/5 stars
Pitchfork	8.6/10
PopMatters	8/10
Stylus Magazine	B+
Uncut	4/5 stars

Strange Geometry is the third studio album by English indie pop band the Clientele. The album was released on 30 August 2005 by Merge Records and on 5 September 2005 by Pointy Records. It was recorded in Walthamstow, London, and received generally positive reviews upon release.

The album's first single was "Since K Got Over Me", which was released on 22 August 2005 in limited quantities on 7" vinyl, backed with "Devil Got My Woman" and "I Believe It". The song "(I Can't Seem To) Make You Mine" originally appeared on a split single with The Relict in 2001, featuring additional vocals by Pam Berry.

The album cover features the 1963 painting The Viaduct by Paul Delvaux.

== Track listing ==
All tracks are written by The Clientele (Alasdair MacLean, James Hornsey and Mark Keen).

No.	Title	Length
1.	"Since K Got Over Me"	3:52
2.	"(I Can't Seem To) Make You Mine"	3:38
3.	"My Own Face Inside the Trees"	3:08
4.	"K"	2:41
5.	"E.M.P.T.Y."	4:24
6.	"When I Came Home from the Party"	2:53
7.	"Geometry of Lawns"	2:52
8.	"Spirit"	2:52
9.	"Impossible"	5:06
10.	"Step into the Light"	4:00
11.	"Losing Haringey"	4:01
12.	"Six of Spades"	2:21
Total length:		41:48

== Personnel ==
Credits for Strange Geometry adapted from album liner notes.

The Clientele

- Alasdair MacLean – vocals, guitar, bouzouki, Rhodes piano, bells
- James Hornsey – bass, piano, Hammond organ, percussion
- Mark Keen – drums, vocals, piano, Hammond organ, percussion

Additional musicians

- Nikki Gleed – violin (1st)
- Sarah Squires – violin (2nd)
- Hannah Stewart – cello
- Charlie Stock – viola

Production

- Brian O'Shaughnessy – production
