= Never Even Told Me Her Name =

EP by Air Traffic
- Released: 30 October 2006
- Genre: Indie rock
- Length: 11:35
- Label: Tiny Consumer (EMI)

Air Traffic chronology
"Charlotte"/"Just Abuse Me" (Double A-side) (2006)	Never Even Told Me Her Name (2006)	"Charlotte" (re-release) (2007)

Never Even Told Me Her Name is the debut EP by Bournemouth-based band Air Traffic.

It was released on 30 October 2006, as the band's first release with EMI Records. "Time Goes By" is found on the EP as an acoustic version and would later be re-recorded with the full band for the album. One of these tracks, a demo named "Shooting Star", would later be re-recorded and re-released as a single on 18 June 2007.

The artwork for the EP was designed by the band and photographed in the Recording Studio where they were currently recording their debut album, Fractured Life, in Rockfield Studio, Monmouth, Wales.

Due to being an EP, "Never Even Told Me Her Name" was ineligible to enter the UK Top 40. It was released as a CD, download, and limited edition, numbered double 7" vinyl.

== Track listings ==
CD (B000JBWUQW)

1. "Never Even Told Me Her Name" (2:42)
2. "Get In Line" (2:05)
3. "Time Goes By (acoustic)" (2:48)
4. "Shooting Star (demo)" (4:00)
