= Heliopause (band) =

U.K. music band

- Origin: Belfast, Northern Ireland
- Genres: Post-rock; indie rock; slowcore; shoegaze
- Years active: 2006 – present
- Labels: Furious Tradesmen
- Members: Richard Davis; Niall Harden; Chris McCorry
- Past members: Michael Kinloch; Therese McKenna
- Website: heliopause.co.uk

Heliopause are a U.K. band based in Belfast and Brighton, led by filmmaker Richard Davis. The band is known for performing in unusual locations such as May Street Church, the Ulster Hall, the Palm House at Botanic Gardens, the dome over Belfast's Victoria Square shopping centre, at the Willowstone music festival and the Hammer gallery in Berlin.

They released their debut EP Dark Matter on Furious Tradesmen in May 2008, two months after the exquisite instrumental band from which they took their name released their self-titled debut EP Heliopause on Rampapo records. Guitarist Michael Kinloch departed after the EP's release to concentrate on playing bass in Not Squares. Chris McCorry, formerly of Cutaways joined in late 2008 and the trio released a handmade single, "Moment of Recognition" in 2009. Their debut album, Walk into the Sea, was recorded at Belfast's Start Together studio in summer 2009, and released on 1 October 2010.

== Discography ==
=== EPs ===
- Dark Matter (2008)

=== Singles ===
- "Moment of Recognition" (2009)

=== Albums ===
- Walk into the Sea (2010)
