= Music for the Age of Miracles =

Studio album by the Clientele
- Released: 22 September 2017
- Genre: Indie rock
- Length: 47:38
- Label: Merge; Tapete

The Clientele chronology
Minotaur (2010)	Music for the Age of Miracles (2017)	I Am Not There Anymore (2023)

Singles from Music for the Age of Miracles
- 1. "Lunar Days" Released: June 15, 2017; 2. "Everyone You Meet" Released: August 9, 2017; 3. "Everything You See Tonight Is Different From Itself" Released: September 14, 2017

Professional ratings
Aggregate scores
Source	Rating
AnyDecentMusic?	7.9/10
Metacritic	80/100
Review scores
Source	Rating
AllMusic	4/5 stars
Mojo	4/5 stars
MusicOMH	4/5 stars
Pitchfork	6.7/10
PopMatters	7/10
Q	4/5 stars
Record Collector	4/5 stars
Uncut	8/10

Music for the Age of Miracles is the sixth studio album by English indie pop band the Clientele. It was released on 22 September 2017 by Merge Records in the United States and Tapete Records in Europe.

== Background ==
On June 15 it was announced that "Music For the Age Of Miracles" would be released on September 22 on Merge Records and the first single from the album, "Lunar Days", was shared online. On August 9, a second single, "Everyone You Meet", was shared alongside a video for the song. On September 14, one week before the album's release, a third single, "Everything You See Tonight Is Different From Itself", was shared online. On October 30, a video for the opening song on the album, "The Neighbour", was also released.

== Track listing ==
All tracks are written by The Clientele (Alasdair MacLean, James Hornsey and Mark Keen), except where noted

No.	Title	Writer(s)	Length
1.	"The Neighbour"		5:09
2.	"Lyra in April"	Keen	1:31
3.	"Lunar Days"		4:13
4.	"Falling Asleep"		6:33
5.	"Everything You See Tonight Is Different from Itself"		6:39
6.	"Lyra in October"	Keen	0:42
7.	"Everyone You Meet"		4:18
8.	"The Circus"		3:57
9.	"Constellations Echo Lanes"		3:44
10.	"The Museum of Fog"		4:12
11.	"North Circular Days"	Keen	1:48
12.	"The Age of Miracles"		4:52
Total length:			47:38

Deluxe version bonus tracks
No.	Title	Length
13.	"All Alone"	4:08
14.	"Lyra in August"	2:37
Total length:		54:23

== Personnel ==
Credits for Music for the Age of Miracles adapted from album liner notes.

The Clientele

- Alasdair MacLean – vocals, guitar, tape, arrangement
- James Hornsey – bass
- Mark Keen – drums, percussion, piano, arrangement

Additional musicians

- Barbara Bartz – violin
- Leon Beckenham – trumpet
- Freddie Bois – trumpet
- Anne Gray – tenor recorder
- Anthony Harmer – guitar, vocals, piano, keyboards, percussion, beats, brass and string arrangements and conducting
- Joyce Efia Harmer – descant recorder
- Mary Lattimore – harp
- Sebastian Millett – cello
- Lupe Núñez-Fernández – vocals
- Dave Oxley – French horn

Production

- Anthony Harmer – recording
- Jeff Lipton – mastering
- Brian O'Shaughnessy – recording
- Maria Rice – mastering (assistant)
- Shuta Shinoda – recording

Artwork and design

- Daniel Murphy – design

== Charts ==
Chart (2017)	Peak position
US Heatseekers Albums (Billboard)	22
