= Yo Zushi =

- Born: Hiroshima, Japan
- Origin: London, England
- Genres: Freak folk Alternative rock Country
- Occupation: Singer-songwriter
- Instruments: Guitar vocals
- Years active: 2004 – present
- Labels: Pointy Records, Eidola Records
- Website: www.yozushi.net

Yo Zushi is a British-Japanese singer-songwriter and editor, who rose to prominence in the UK freak folk scene with two albums released on London's Pointy Records. He is a sub-editor for the New Statesman magazine.

== Early life and education ==
Zushi was born in Hiroshima, Japan and moved to Britain as a child. He attended University College School in Hampstead. He graduated from University College London (UCL) with a Master of Arts (MA) in English: Issues in Modern Culture.

== Career ==
In 2004 Zushi was the winner (in the music category) of the Re:Creation Prize, run by Topshop and style magazine Dazed & Confused. This was followed by a short period in a folk rock band, Great Days of Sail, with gig support slots in the company of nu-folk icons Joanna Newsom, The Magic Numbers, Willy Mason, Micah P. Hinson and anti-folk founder Lach. The band dissolved after one self-titled EP.

In 2005 Zushi was signed to Pointy Records to release Songs From a Dazzling Drift. A collection of country-infused pop songs drawn from rough home recordings, it was quickly picked up by the British music press as a minor classic. Q magazine gave it a four-star review (including it in the "Q Recommends" category), and enthused that "this could be the start of something major". Dazed & Confused called it a "masterclass in storytelling". An intermittent series of live appearances followed, supporting the likes of Scritti Politti and Patrick Wolf, as well as performing on the main town hall stage at the Oxford Folk Festival with Bellowhead and Rachel Unthank and the Winterset.

After publishing a short story in Dazed & Confused and completing a Modern Culture MA at University College, London, Yo Zushi released his second album, Notes for Holy Larceny in 2007. It was produced by Greg Box and Daniel Lea of By the Fireside and features alt-classical singer-songwriter Ana Silvera on piano, as well as Sean King from A sleeper's union/ Eidola records, Dan and James McKean, Ross Palmer, Antonio Papaleo and Russell Parton amongst others (full band list on record sleeve). The album has been favorably compared with the music of Hank Williams, Bob Dylan, Willie Nelson, Johnny Cash and Tom Waits . In March 2009, Zushi will release Jangadeiros, a collection of home demos and songs recorded at studio sessions on the Italian label Best Kept Secret, which releases albums on audio cassette only. He is currently working on Video Days, the follow-up to Notes for "Holy Larceny".

In January 2015, Eidola Records released the third album of Yo Zushi : It Never Entered My Mind, with nine new songs.
