= Royworld =

British pop rock band

- Origin: London, England
- Genres: Alternative rock, pop rock, indie rock
- Years active: 2006–present
- Label: None (previously Virgin Records)
- Members: Rod Futrille - vocals Rob Parkin - guitar Tim Miles - keyboards Gerry Morgan - drums
- Website: Official Myspace

Royworld are a British pop rock band formed in 2006, when songwriting brothers Rod and Crispin Futrille stuck up an advertisement on the college notice board. Robert Parkin and Timmy Miles met at St. Aidan's & St. John Fisher Associated Sixth Form in Harrogate, where their journey together began. The two duos came together after the advert was answered by Gerry Morgan and Tim Miles. Miles's friend, Rob Parkin, then completed the line-up.

Soon after forming they began to play gigs around London at venues including Dublin Castle, The Barfly and The Hope And Anchor. They had managed to attract the attention of several record labels, including Fierce Panda Records, who released their single "Elasticity" via their Club Fandango imprint in December 2007 and Virgin Records to whom they would eventually sign.

Their first single on Virgin Records, "Dust," was released on 19 May 2008, and reached No. 29 in the UK Singles Chart. Their debut album was released 2 June 2008 and was produced by Andy Green. Royworld's debut album was recorded at Helioscentric Studios in Rye, and was mixed by Mark 'Spike' Stent in Los Angeles. Royworld supported We Are Scientists on four dates of their April UK tour, and supported Guillemots on their second UK tour. In March 2008 Royworld completed a Get It Loud In Libraries' library tour of the UK, putting on acoustic gigs many of which were free. They completed the tour at Westminster Reference Library featuring a live string quartet, which they went on to use again at Brighton's Great Escape festival.

In September 2008 the band parted company with Virgin Records, the band stated on their official Facebook page: "We recently parted company with Virgin and so unfortunately have had to tie up a few things - including the tour"

The band is currently on hiatus. Gerry Morgan joined the electro rock band, We Got Wires in 2009 while Robert Parkin and Tim Miles formed the band Chaser in 2011. Since 2009 Rod Futrille has been writing and producing for other artists, including Penguin Prison, Nik Kershaw and Ollie Wride. Royworld's music featured in the Channel 4 TV series The Inbetweeners and Made in Chelsea.

== Musical style ==
Royworld drew inspiration from a wide range of music. Talking Heads, Roxy Music, Kate Bush, Peter Gabriel, Queen and Fleetwood Mac have all been mentioned by the band and journalists.

== Discography ==
=== Studio albums ===
- Man in the Machine (released 2 June 2008) UK Albums Chart No. 52

=== Singles ===
- "Elasticity" - 7" vinyl (released 3 December 2007)
- "Man in the Machine" - 7" vinyl (released 3 March 2008)
- "Dust" (released 12 May 2008) - UK Singles Chart No. 29
- "Brakes" (released 1 September 2008)
