= Lost Weekend (EP) =

EP by the Clientele
- Released: 21 March 2002
- Genre: Indie pop
- Length: 19:32
- Label: Acuarela Records
- Producer: The Clientele

The Clientele chronology
Suburban Light (2000)	Lost Weekend (2002)	The Violet Hour (2003)

Professional ratings
Review scores
Source	Rating
AllMusic	3.5/5 stars
Stylus Magazine	C-

Lost Weekend is an EP by the Clientele. The EP was first issued in 2002 on Acuarela Records.

== Track listing ==
No.	Title	Length
1.	"North School Drive"	2:24
2.	"Boring Postcard"	1:09
3.	"Emptily Through Holloway"	5:57
4.	"Kelvin Parade"	4:07
5.	"Last Orders"	6:35
