= Charlotte (Air Traffic song) =

Single by Air Traffic

from the album Fractured Life
- B-side: "An End to All Our Problems"; "Learning How to Shout"
- Released: July 17, 2006
- Recorded: August–September 2006; Rockfield Studio, Monmouth, Wales
- Genre: Alternative rock
- Length: 2:23
- Label: Tiny Consumer/EMI
- Songwriter(s): Chris Wall, David Ryan Jordan, Tom Pritchard and Jim Maddock
- Producer(s): David Kosten

Air Traffic singles chronology
| ""Just Abuse Me" / "Charlotte"" (2006) | "Charlotte" (2007) |

"Just Abuse Me"/"Charlotte"
- Cover of 2007 re-release

Air Traffic singles chronology
| "Just Abuse Me" / "Charlotte" (2006) | ""Charlotte"" (2007) | "Shooting Star" (2007) |

"Charlotte" is a single by Bournemouth-based alternative rock band Air Traffic. Taken from the band's debut studio album Fractured Life, the track was released through Tiny Consumer, a record label division of EMI. "Charlotte" was first released as part of the band's debut single, a double a-side with "Just Abuse Me", on July 17, 2006. The single was released as the fifth in a series of black and white vinyls by Label Fandango - the independent record label of live music promotion company Club Fandango - which was the band's record label at the time.

"Charlotte" was re-released on March 26, 2007, becoming the band's first proper single. The re-released single received moderate airplay on radio and music television channels, particularly as part of the MTV2/NME Chart and MTV2's "Spanking New Music" show. It stayed on the UK Singles Chart for one week on April 7, 2007, at #33.

== Track listings ==
CD (B000NO20II)

1. "Charlotte" (2:23)
2. "An End to All Our Problems" (5:03)
3. "Learning How to Shout" (2:48)
4. "Charlotte" (2:23)

7" vinyl (B000NO20M4)

1. "Charlotte" (2:23)
2. "An End to All Our Problems" (5:03)
3. "Learning How to Shout" (2:48)
4. "Charlotte" (2:23)
