= George Pringle =

British artist

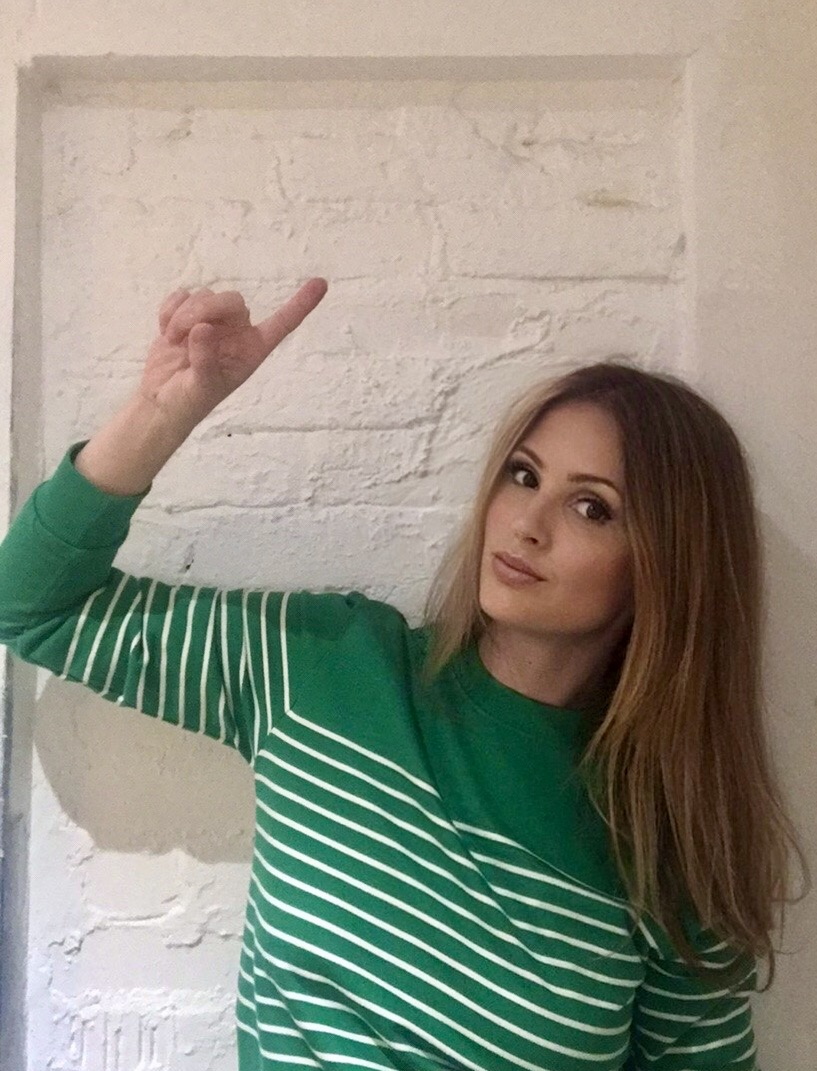
George Pringle

Georgina Richards-Pringle is an artist, music producer, Radio DJ, performer, writer and curator from London, UK. She is best known for her stream-of-consciousness style poetry and prose delivered over backing tracks which she creates on GarageBand music software.

== Biography ==
George Pringle was born in London on 28 December 1984 to architect parents (John Pringle & Penny Richards of Pringle Richards Sharratt Architects), and grew up in World's End, Chelsea. She is of English, Scottish and Moroccan (Sephardi and Berber Jewish) descent. She drew constantly from a young age and at the age of 11, went to board at Malvern Girls' College in Worcestershire after winning an Art Scholarship. George studied piano. She first started experimenting with home recording at the age of 16 when she got hold of her older brother's guitar and started making demos on a two deck Karaoke machine at home during the holidays. She then started recording tracks on a French Oral examination tape recorder in the school hall at night using the assembly microphone. She formed a punk band whilst at Malvern.

She studied Fine Art at Oxford Brookes University. It was at University that she discovered GarageBand music software which came on her iBook and started composing electronic music to accompany the poetry and prose that she writes.

In 2006 she caught the attention of Drowned in Sound founder Sean Adams and he started managing her. He featured her debut single "Carte Postale" in the NME Ones to Watch section, launching her career.

She went on to be championed by Laura Barton in The Guardian and more mainstream press ensued with features in The Sunday Times, The Independent, ID Magazine and Dazed & Confused amongst others.

Pringle has recorded live sessions for BBC Radio 1 at Maida Vale as well as featuring on The Verb for BBC Radio 3 and spinning regularly on BBC Radio 6 Music, becoming a favourite of Steve Lamacq and Tom Robinson. She has played Music and Literary Festivals including Reading, Leeds, Bestival, Latitude and Massive Attack's Meltdown Festival, Hull Literary Festival and has also performed at Fabric Nightclub.

At the beginning of 2010, she supported the French band Air on the European leg of their tour, finishing at The Roundhouse in London.

Based in London, she has released two critically acclaimed LPs to date. "Salon des Refuses" (an electro poetry album) and "Golfo dei Poeti" (a conceptual soundtrack album). She also provides the vocals for the track Cutlery Drawer on the Scottish band Errors' 2008 album "It's Not Something But It Is Like Whatever".

She also monologues in Italian alongside Davide Esposito on his cover of "Tornero". Claudia Cardinale also delivers vocals on the record.

From 2011-2013 she toured playing synth and bass for Jeremy Jay, performing at venues in Europe including Primavera Sound. The two also briefly recorded under the name "Eclipse".

George returned to university in 2014 and graduated with an MA in Filmmaking from Goldsmiths in 2015.

In 2018 her story "Bus Stop H and The Ghost" was published in "Bus Fare". An anthology of writing inspired by travelling on the London buses featuring alongside authors such as Charles Dickens and Virginia Woolf.

In 2019 a short film she made, "Waterloo" featured as a part of "Alive in The Universe" at the Venice Biennale.

In 2018 Pringle opened an art gallery and cafe in East London. She curates and is Director, showcasing up and coming artists and creating a social space for artists and local community. She has collaborated and co-hosted "Come Hell or High Water", a collective that interacted with the foreshore in Limehouse alongside the Artist, Anne Bean.

During the Pandemic, she hosted a radio show on "BetterDays FM" which focused on industrial, synthwave, Krautrock, Italo, New Wave and Disco amongst other Alt genres.

== Releases ==
- "Golfo dei Poeti" (album), March 2013 (self released)
- "Salon des Refusés", September 2009 (self released)
- "LCD, I love you, but you're bringing me down", Sept 2008 (Trouble Records)
- "Poor EP, Poor EP Without a Name", March 2008 (self released)
