= It's Art, Dad =

Compilation album by the Clientele
- Released: October 2005
- Recorded: 1991–1996
- Genre: Indie pop
- Label: Self-released
- Producer: The Clientele

The Clientele chronology
Strange Geometry (2005)	It's Art, Dad (2005)	God Save The Clientele (2007)

Professional ratings
Review scores
Source	Rating
Pitchfork	(6.3)

It's Art, Dad is a self-released compilation album of early recordings by the Clientele. It was released in very limited quantities on the band's 2005–2006 tour dates as well as the band's website. It comprises various recordings from the band's early days (1991 through 1996). These songs include the founding member Innes Phillips, who left The Clientele in 1996.

== Track listing ==
1. "Graven Wood"
2. "Dear Jennifer"
3. "February Moon"
4. "Elm Grove Window"
5. "The Night That Changed Our Minds"
6. "When She's Tired of Dancing"
7. "Untitled #2"
8. "The Evening in Your Eyes"
9. "St. James' Walk"
10. "Shadow of Your Life"
11. "August Sky"
12. "The Words We Knew"
13. "St. Paul's Beneath a Sinking Sky"
14. "Can't Sleep"
15. "Sweeten Your Eyes"
16. "Graven Wood" (Rehearsal)
