= Nedry =

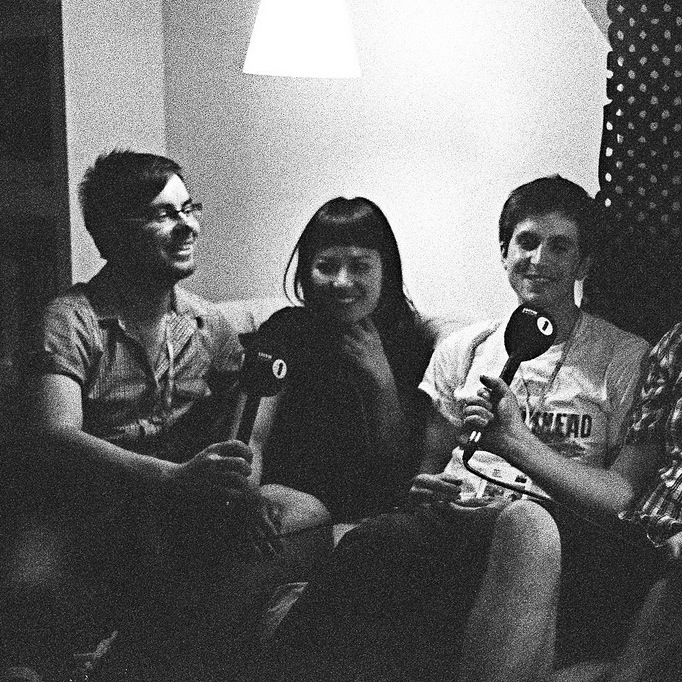
- Nedry in interview for BBC Radio 1

Background information
- Origin: London, England
- Genres: Post-rock, trip hop, dubstep, electronica
- Years active: 2008–present
- Label: Monotreme Records 2008–present
- Members: Chris Amblin; Matt Parker; Ayu Okakita
- Website: www.nedrymakesmusic.com

Nedry are an English three-piece band formed in London, England, in 2008. The band consists of Chris Amblin and Matt Parker, on guitars, laptops and synthesizers and Ayu Okakita on vocals. The band has released two albums, Condors, released in 2010, and In a Dim Light, released in 2012.

== Career ==
The three-piece originally formed in Spring of 2008, although Ayu Okakita was not available for any of the live performances in 2008 due to her involvement with a further project based in Berlin. Chris Amblin and Matt Parker worked together creating instrumental music, performing together for the first time at Truck Festival in Oxford in 2008. They first performed under the name Nedry (a name which was influenced by Dennis Nedry, the technician from Jurassic Park) later that year in London. Ayu Okakita settled permanently back in London in January 2009 and continued to work with the band. Nedry performed live as a trio for the first time in March 2009 at the Strongrooms Bar in East London.

During the promotion of Condors, Chris Amblin gave a copy to Huw Stephens of BBC Radio 1 at the Sónar music festival in 2009. Stephens played some of the tracks on his show and went on to invite the band for a live session at the BBC's Maida Vale Studios. The subsequent media attention led to the band signing to Monotreme Records where the album was re-released. Zankyo Records released Condors in Japan in early 2011.

In 2010 they performed at the popular rock festival Roskilde Festival, Sónar in Barcelona and the UK's Latitude Festival and Truck Festival. They also toured the UK and Europe opening for 65daysofstatic as well as headlining their own tour of Italy. In 2011, the band performed at South By South West in Austin, Texas as part of a British Music Showcase.

Their second studio album, In a Dim Light was released on Monotreme Records on 12 March 2012.

== Discography ==
- SZ EP (2009)
- Condors (2009)
- In a Dim Light (2012)
- In a Dim Light Remixed (2012)
