= Minotaur (The Clientele album) =

Studio album by the Clientele
- Released: 6 September 2010
- Genre: Indie pop
- Length: 26:42
- Label: Merge Records
- Producer: The Clientele

The Clientele chronology
Bonfires on the Heath (2009)	Minotaur (2010)	Music for the Age of Miracles (2017)

Professional ratings
Review scores
Source	Rating
Pitchfork	(6.5/10)

Minotaur is a Mini-LP from the Clientele. The album was officially announced and titled on 17 July 2010 on the band's official website.

== Track listing ==
1. "Minotaur" – 3:15
2. "Jerry" – 3:57
3. "As the World Rises and Falls" – 4:59
4. "Paul Verlaine" – 3:00
5. "Strange Town" – 1:40
6. "No. 33" – 1:51
7. "The Green Man" – 5:07
8. "Nothing Here Is What It Seems" – 2:58
9. "One Hundred Leaves" – 4:08 (High Note version bonus track)
