= In a Dim Light =

Studio album by Nedry
- Released: 12 March 2012
- Genre: Dubstep; trip hop; ambient; post-rock
- Length: 47:12
- Label: Monotreme
- Producer: Nedry

Nedry chronology
Condors (2009)	In a Dim Light (2012)

Singles from In A Dim Light
- 1. "Float" Released: 16 January 2012; 2. "Post Six" Released: 16 January 2012

In a Dim Light is the second studio album by British dubstep trio Nedry, consisting of Chris Amblin, Matt Parker, and singer Ayu Okakita. Released by Monotreme Records on 12 March 2012, In a Dim Light is an ambient post-rock dubstep record having a more atmospheric, suspenseful and "heavier" tone than the trio's debut album Condors (2010); Nedry were inspired to make an atmospheric album by audience reactions to shows the trio performed following the release of Condors. In a Dim Light garnered many favorable reviews from professional music journalists upon its release, a common praise being how it mixed several different genre and elements of other artist's works together while still maintaining a unique and coherent sound.

== Production ==
In a Dim Light was produced with Ableton, with each of the members sharing their respective work on the session files through file sharing services. The creation of each track began with Chris Amblin making drum parts. Then, Matt Parker was responsible for editing the rhythms of the drums Amblin composed. Ayu Okakita then either sang on off-beats to make a lead vocal melody or made a rhythmic backing vocal. In addition to singing the lead vocals, Okakita was also involved in writing melodies and coming up with concepts for the rhythmic structures and vibes of the tracks. Each song was developed in different ways and took a long time to finish, which Amblin said was because the group members were making music of an electronic style and that their creative process was "really quite convoluted."

== Mood ==
With In a Dim Light, Nedry intended to create an album that combined together both dark tones and light-hearted enjoyment; the audience reaction of the shows Nedry performed following the release of their first album Condors (2009) inspired them to create tracks with "more atmospheric and heavier" elements that affected the emotion of the listener. Amblin explained that the long lengths for most of the tracks on the album were for them to build in terms of mood and atmosphere. The LP derives from gothic elements of the works of David Lynch and the set of poems Four Quartets (1943) by T. S. Eliot.

The record mostly consisting of what journalist Amelia Gregory described as "alternating tensions." Heather Steele, a critic for DIY magazine, called it a "complex" record with "glitches, slow beats and breakdowns," categorizing the album to be in an "alternative mode" of contemporary dance music: "It’s grand and sweeping, yet held back: continually withdrawing during the climactic moments that you’re certain are set to explode. It’s restrained [...] yet it’s far from quiet, and it’s this restraint that gives the record an edge of direct suspense while subverting directional expectations." Similar analysis came from journalist Silvia Carluccio, explaining that, despite remaining steady in terms of rhythm and tempo, the album was still "trapped in some sort of mystery and restlessness." Some of the album's tracks have a sinister vibe, such as "Post Six" which, as Daniel Paton of musicOMH explained, "seems to swell to a near-apocalyptic conclusion," and "Viocelae," which he analogized to be a "precursor to some fascinating, powerful threat."

== Composition ==
Categorized by Amblin as a trip hop album with elements of modern music, In A Dim Light is an ambient post-rock dubstep album. Regarding the music of the album, critics noted that it had similarities to the works of Portishead, Massive Attack, Burial, Radiohead, 65daysofstatic, and Lamb. In A Dim Light contains a heavy amount of sub-bass, fuzz, and crackling noises among Music Production Center-like textures, guitars, and synthesizers. McVeigh described the album's sounds as "hypnotic, and on higher volumes, truly punishing," writing that the record "feels rather like the inner workings of some vast machine - solid, heavy, intricate, and tactile."

Okakita's vocal performance on the album heavily consists of moaning, fluctuation, and what writer Ryan Simmons labeled as "unusual cadences" and was compared by multiple critics to Icelandic singer Björk. Her velocity ranges to whispery to loud, and, according to journalist Elliot McVeigh, the vocals serve as a "pure sonic presence" that determine the mood of each track. Paton noted her vocals to have the same "country tinged mannerisms" as Jolie Holland. Okakita's singing also has many similarities to Kazu Makino in that both vocalists are Japanese and, in the words of BBC Music journalist Mike Diver, have "second-language phrasing which lends uncommon vulnerability to their words."

Robin Murray of Clash magazine wrote that the music on the record is "decayed" and "fragmented," and the types of tracks range from "epic song structures" like "Havana Nights" to "delicate sonic fragments" such as "Land Leviathan. AllMusic journalist Heather Phares analyzed that In A Dim Light follows a "subtler, often monochromatic" structure than the group's "collage-like" album Condors. She wrote that the album "play[s] cat-and-mouse with [the] listeners," first calming the listener in with "insectoid" drum beats and "fragile" vocals before "bass bombs" come in to the mix. Steele analyzed that each track doesn't follow a consistent structure, though this is not noticed on first listens. Two tracks she used to back up this claim are "I Would Rather Explode" and "Havana Night." She wrote that "I Would Rather Explode" doesn't reach the highest volume the listener expects it to as it is stuck in a "continual dull thudding in the background." "Havana Nights," on the other hand, is a much more upbeat cut with "unexpected thuds and twitches" and chants.

== Release and promotion ==
On 16 January 2012, "Float" and "Post Six" were released as pre-album singles. An official video for "Violaceae" was directed by Dan Tassell and premiered via Consequence of Sound on 6 February 2012. The black-and-white video involves Okakita dancing inside a growing flower. In A Dim Light was officially released by Monotreme Records on 12 March 2012, with a remix album issued on 14 May 2012.

== Critical reception ==
Professional ratings
Aggregate scores
Source	Rating
Metacritic	77/100
Review scores
Source	Rating
The 405	8/10
AllMusic	3.5/5 stars
Clash	8/10
DIY	7/10
musicOMH	4/5 stars
No Ripcord	8/10 stars
Pop 'stache	2.5/5 stars
Uncut	3.5/5 stars

Phares opined that with the album, "Nedry never get as self-consciously slick as many of the bands that made trip-hop so dully tasteful in its later years, but they're still at their best when they're fully in touch with their volatile side." Reviewer Chris Woolfrey called In A Dim Light a "great album," praising the duo's "powerful" ability to make an album that was perfect to listen to in any setting, which was further helped by the record's "pure" and "clean" production: "You can listen to In a Dim Light in the grey-dull of Winter or the crisp sun of spring and it seems to fit the mood effortlessly; it envelopes what’s around it and alters the environment to its mood." He recommended that listeners hear the album with "good quality equipment." In A Dim Light landed on Drowned in Sound's year-end list of the "Lost 12 of 2012," where Elliot McVeigh heavily praised Okakita's vocals which she described as "powerful, and not in an aimless, caterwauling way," and like "air" since "without it, the album would suffocate."

A common highlight in many reviews of In A Dim Light was its how it mixed several different genre and elements of other artist's works together while still maintaining a unique and coherent sound. In fact, Diver analyzed that it did have elements of music by other acts, but they were hardly noticeably and "lost amidst the mix as quickly as they’ve manifested." Steele wrote in her review, "what Nedry succeed in doing is taking individual characteristics of various electronic styles and merging them together to create something thoroughly modern." Steele wrote that the album showcases Nedry's ability for "creating painstakingly crafted songs" and "revels in its synergy of restrained dub, driving electronics and ethereal vocals." A critic for Igloo magazine gave the album a highly favorable review, writing that "there are a lot of fusions out there, but this is one of those that truly shine with creativity and boundless spirit." The review also stated that "contains all kinds of different shades, and will launch you into an intense, emotional roller coaster that perfectly suits these modern times." A [sic] magazine critic wrote that the album was "reminiscent of many things but still unique to itself," concluding that "it’s not all killer, but now, as then, when Nedry hit they do so with Ninja Tune precision."

Stephen Wragg of No Ripcord called In A Dim Light "an original and fascinating record," analyzing that it uses "catchy and emotive chord structures" to build each track and that its best cuts are those that push the group out of their limits. However, he also had minor criticisms towards the LP, such as a couple of songs having "murky urban atmospherics [...] without developing much further" and that its dark mood was, "at times, at the expense of memorable songcraft." A critic for Dummy magazine opined that with the album, Nedry were the only act to have "a true expression of music with the universe as its inspiration," praising the record for "offering transcendence through detachment," Okakita's "exceptional" vocals, and how they are "both grounded and independent of the remaining members’ textured sonic foundation." Paton called In A Dim Light a "wonderfully challenging, disorientating and immersive work," praising Nedry's "carefully judged and balanced" method of structuring sounds "without sounding oppressive or impenetrable." He highlighted that the songs on the album are "allowed to build and develop at their own natural pace," writing that "whilst the tone of the music is frequently attacking and powerful, the music never feels cluttered or overcooked."

In A Dim Light also garnered a few mixed reviews from critics as well. Simmons labeled it "music that needs to be experienced on a primal level." He wrote that it "creates a tense feeling that, while very intentional, is not always easy on the ears." He described Okakita's vocal performance as distinctive but not enjoyable, writing that she "comes off as a bit shallow, like an actor chewing the scenery and trying to steal a spotlight." Daniel Sylvester of Exclaim! described the record as "a frustrating listen" and "an adventurous outing by a band that plainly need to sharpen their craft." He disliked the sound of the album for being "less organic than trip-hop's first-wave" and wrote that Okakita mostly sings "muddy, melody-less, go-nowhere verses to fill the majority of the album."

== Track listing ==
In A Dim Light – Standard version
No.	Title	Length
1.	"I Would Rather Explode"	5:02
2.	"Post Six"	5:06
3.	"Violaceae"	4:53
4.	"Havana Nights"	5:40
5.	"Dusk Till Dawn"	3:08
6.	"Float"	6:49
7.	"Land Leviathan"	1:52
8.	"TMA"	3:03
9.	"Here.Now.Here"	5:21
10.	"Home"	6:18
Total length:		47:12

In A Dim Light Remixed
No.	Title	Remixer	Length
1.	"here.now.here"	M+A	4:12
2.	"TMA"	Paper Tiger	3:58
3.	"Float"	Jack Allett	7:05
4.	"Violaceae"	Rosko John	4:25
5.	"here.now.here"	Worship	3:53
6.	"Dusk Till Dawn"	Capac	4:58
7.	"Float"	Useless Interface	3:45
8.	"Violaceae"	Gazelle Twin	6:49
9.	"Havana Nights"	Ghosting Season	4:43
10.	"Violaceae"	Polinski	3:36
11.	"Float"	Midas Fall	5:28
12.	"here.now.here"	Familiar Spirits	6:16
Total length:			59:08

== Personnel ==
Derived from the liner notes of In A Dim Light.

- Written, performed, recorded, and produced by Ayu Okakita, Chris Amblin, and Matt Parker
- Mastered by Guy Davie at Electric Mastering in London
- Artwork designed and illustrated by Dan Tassell
