= Ariadne (EP) =

EP by the Clientele
- Released: 1 March 2004
- Recorded: January 2004
- Genre: Indie pop
- Length: 19:02
- Label: Acuarela Records
- Producer: The Clientele

The Clientele chronology
The Violet Hour (2003)	Ariadne (2004)	Strange Geometry (2005)

Professional ratings
Review scores
Source	Rating
AllMusic	3.5/5 stars

Ariadne is an EP by the Clientele, released in 2004 on Acuarela Records.

== Track listing ==
1. "Enigma" - 0:40
2. "Summer Crowds in Europe" - 3:12
3. "The Sea Inside a Shell" - 8:32
4. "Ariadne Sleeping" - 2:53
5. "Impossible" - 4:25
