= No More Running Away =

Single by Air Traffic

from the album Fractured Life
- Released: September 24, 2007
- Genre: Indie rock
- Length: 4:22
- Label: Tiny Consumer
- Songwriter(s): Chris Wall, David Ryan Jordan, Tom Pritchard and Jim Maddock

Air Traffic singles chronology
"Shooting Star" (2007)	"No More Running Away" (2007)

"No More Running Away" is a song by English alternative rock band Air Traffic. It was the third single released from the band's debut album, Fractured Life. It was released on 24 September 2007 on CD and 7" vinyl and available as a digital download. It reached a peak position of #45 on the UK Singles Chart.

During a UK tour which coincided with the single's release, a live recording was made of each performance of the song, which fans would have the opportunity to purchase and download. These sales counted towards the chart position of the song. The music video for the song was directed by Scott Lyon of Factory Films, on location in Bucharest, Romania.

== Track listing ==
CD

1. "No More Running Away (Single Version)"
2. "Don't Wake Up"
3. "No More Running Away (Live)"

7" Vinyl #1

1. "No More Running Away (Album Version)"
2. "Boy With No Mind"

7" Vinyl #2 (Picture Disc)

1. "No More Running Away (Alternative Version)"
2. "The Running Caught Me High"

== Charts ==
Chart (2007)	Peak position
UK Singles (OCC)	45
