= The Clientele =

British band

- Origin: London, England
- Genres: Indie pop; chamber pop; dream pop; psychedelic pop
- Years active: 1991–present
- Labels: Pointy; Merge
- Members: Alasdair MacLean; Mark Keen; James Hornsey
- Past members: Mel Draisey; Innes Phillips; Daniel Evans; Howard Monk
- Website: theclientele.co.uk

The Clientele are an English indie pop band formed in London in 1991. The band are currently composed of lead singer/guitarist Alasdair MacLean, drummer Mark Keen and bassist James Hornsey. Since their inception, the Clientele have released eight albums and five EPs.

The band have toured extensively in the United States, where they have experienced more success than in their native Britain. They are currently signed to Merge Records, a North Carolina–based independent record label owned by members of Superchunk.

== History ==
MacLean and Hornsey both grew up in Hampshire, England, and began collaborating musically while still in school, after MacLean saw that Hornsey had written the name of the band Felt on his pencil case. The band formed in 1991, with Innes Phillips sharing singing and songwriting duties with MacLean; their original name was The Butterfly Collectors. The band recorded an album's worth of material but failed to get any label interest. Innes left the band (and would go on to found The Relict); the rest of the group re-formed in 1997, after which they moved to London and released a number of singles that were eventually collected on Suburban Light (2000). That compilation won the band glowing reviews; SF Weekly said the band "offers a brand of appealingly melancholy pop that might just surpass that of its forebears." The Violet Hour (2003) was their first album proper, which again saw great acclaim, but, as yet, little commercial success.

August 2005 saw the release of their second album, Strange Geometry, the first the band recorded with a producer, Brian O'Shaughnessy, who had previously produced Primal Scream. It was notable for a much cleaner production sound than the reverb-heavy sound that had previously been their defining characteristic; it was also the first time the band had used a strings section on one of their records. The task of writing these arrangements was given to Louis Philippe. One single, "Since K Got Over Me", was released from the album. Another song from the album, "(I Can't Seem) To Make You Mine", was featured on the soundtrack of the film The Lake House.

Strange Geometry was quickly followed by a collection of recordings from 1991 to 1996, featuring Innes Phillips, called It's Art, Dad. After a U.S. tour in August 2006, The Clientele became a four-piece again, adding Mel Draisey (on violin, keys and percussion), who became their first female member. They then recorded the album God Save The Clientele with producer Mark Nevers, known for his work with Merge labelmates Lambchop; the album again featured several Louis Philippe-composed string arrangements. God Save The Clientele was released in May 2007 in the United States. Bonfires on the Heath followed in October 2009, and Minotaur, a Mini-LP, was released on 17 July 2010.

On 6 July 2011, the band announced on its website that The Clientele would be taking an indefinite hiatus. MacLean subsequently spent time on a project called Amor de Días, a collaboration with Spanish vocalist and instrumentalist Lupe Núñez-Fernández (of the indie pop duo Pipas). Amor de Días released two albums between 2011 and 2013.

The band announced that it would reunite for a lone gig at The Bell House in Brooklyn on 21 March 2014.

Since then, the 'Suburban Light' album has been reissued with bonus tracks and gave the band a Billboard top 30 album for the first time in their history. They also released two new singles in 2014, 'Falling Asleep' and 'On A Summer Trail'. The band have continued to tour in both the US and Europe, and MacLean is writing songs which may constitute a forthcoming album. On 24 March 2016, the group's official Facebook page posted an image of the mixing board at Brian O'Shaughnessy's Bark Studios in London, with the implication that the group were recording new material. On 16 June 2017, the band announced a new album, Music for the Age of Miracles, and a tour.

In July 2023, the band released their seventh studio album, I Am Not There Anymore.

== Style ==
The Clientele has been described musically as indie pop, chamber pop, dream pop and psychedelic pop. Their music has often been noted for its reverb-rich production and MacLean's distinctive breathy vocals (an effect achieved partly by MacLean singing with a microphone plugged into a guitar amplifier) and fingerstyle guitar technique. Their lyrics take a strong inspiration from surrealist literature and art from the early 20th century; "We Could Walk Together" quotes a line ("like a silver ring thrown into the flood of my heart") from a 1928 poem by French surrealist Joë Bousquet; in its final two verses, the song "What Goes Up" quotes the poem "Stupidity Street" by Ralph Hodgson in its entirety.

== Discography ==
=== Albums ===
- Suburban Light (November 2000)
- The Violet Hour (July 2003)
- Strange Geometry (October 2005)
- It's Art, Dad (recordings from 1991 to 1996) (October 2005)
- God Save The Clientele (May 2007)
- Bonfires on the Heath (October 2009)
- Minotaur (September 2010)
- Music for the Age of Miracles (September 2017)
- I Am Not There Anymore (July 2023)

=== EPs ===
- A Fading Summer EP (June 2000)
- Lost Weekend EP (March 2002)
- Ariadne EP (March 2004)
- That Night a Forest Grew (2008)
- A Sense of Falling: Strange Geometry Outtakes (2016)

=== Singles ===
- "What Goes Up" b/w "Five Day Morning" (June 1998)
- All The Dust And Glass: "Reflections After Jane" b/w "An Hour Before The Light" (March 1999)
- "Lacewings" b/w "Saturday" (September 1999)
- "I Had To Say This" b/w "Monday's Rain" (December 1999)
- "(I Want You) More Than Ever" b/w "6 A.M. Morningside" (February 2000)
- "Haunted Melody" b/w "Fear Of Falling" (October 2002)
- "House On Fire" (June 2003)
- "Lacewings" (Live) b/w "Policeman Getting Lost" (Live) (July 2004)
- "Since K Got Over Me" (August 2005)
- "Bookshop Casanova" (April 2007)
- "Falling Asleep" b/w "Orpheus Avenue" (March 2014)
- "Lunar Days" (2017), Tapete Records

=== Split singles ===
- "Held In Glass" by The Relict b/w "(I Can't Seem To) Make You Mine" by The Clientele (February 2001)
- "Grace" by The Saturday People b/w "Porcelain" by The Clientele (July 2001)
- "Six Foot Drop" Cover by The Clientele b/w "We Could Walk Together" Cover by Clock Strikes 13 (January 2002)
- "On A Summer Trail" by The Clientele b/w "Spiral Staircase" by Birdie (July 2014)

== Music videos ==
- "Reflections After Jane" (2001)
- "House On Fire" (2003)
- "Bookshop Casanova" (2007)
- "Everyone You Meet" (2017) [Filmed and directed by Paul Kelly on Super 8]
- "The Neighbour" (2017) [Filmed by Andy Willsher]
- "Blue Over Blue" (2023)
