= That Night a Forest Grew =

EP by the Clientele
- Released: 21 July 2008
- Genre: Indie pop
- Length: 14:40
- Label: Acuarela Discos
- Producer: The Clientele

The Clientele chronology
| God Save The Clientele (2007) | That Night a Forest Grew (2008) | Bonfires on the Heath (2009) |

Professional ratings
Review scores
| Source | Rating |
|---|---|
| Pitchfork | (8.0/10) |

That Night a Forest Grew is an EP by the Clientele. The EP was officially announced and titled 16 May 2008 on the band's official website.

== Track listing ==
1. "Retiro Park" – 4:26
2. "Share the Night" – 3:44
3. "George Says He Has Lost His Way In This World" – 3:12
4. "That Night, a Forest Grew" – 3:18
