= I Am Not There Anymore =

Studio album by the Clientele
- Released: 28 July 2023
- Recorded: 2019–2022
- Studios: Bark, Snap and Klank (London)
- Genre: Indie rock
- Length: 63:05
- Language: English
- Label: Merge

The Clientele chronology
Music for the Age of Miracles (2017)	I Am Not There Anymore (2023)

I Am Not There Anymore is the eighth studio album by British indie pop band the Clientele, released on 28 July 2023 by Merge Records. It has received positive reviews from critics.

== Reception ==
Professional ratings
Aggregate scores
Source	Rating
Metacritic	89/100
Review scores
Source	Rating
AllMusic	4.5/5 stars
MusicOMH	4.5/5 stars
Pitchfork	8.0/10
The Quietus	4/5 stars
Sputnikmusic	4.3/5
Uncut	4.5/5 stars

According to the review aggregator Metacritic, I Am Not There Anymore received "universal acclaim" based on a weighted average score of 89 out of 100 from 9 critic scores. Editors at AllMusic rated this album 4.5 out of 5 stars, with critic Tim Sendra writing this is "another pitch-perfect album from the band, certainly one of their best and most devastatingly pretty works". In his review for Pitchfork, Marc Hogan gave the album an 8.0 out of 10, remarking on its "newfound sonic adventurousness and evocative dream-logic lyrics", and calling it "a bold quest into the vast unknown" for the band. At The Quietus, Tom Bolton speculates that this may be the band's best album, calling it "a complete world, with an unmistakable musical identity". Sunnyvale of Sputnikmusic scored this release a 4.3 out of 5, writing that "despite the sprawling nature of the record, the standard of quality throughout is quite high", but notes that the album runs too long and that "the explicitly personal nature" of the lyrics makes it difficult for listeners to appreciate. In Uncut, Jason Anderson gave this release 4.5 out of 5 stars, calling it "further departure from convention" from the group. Writing for the Wall Street Journal, Mark Richardson compared this work to The Beatles and Donovan, stating that "even as [vocalist Alasdair MacLean's] lyrics and concepts can be arcane, one still finds plenty to hum, and lovely instrumental refrains" and "no other band delivers beautiful existential musings like this one". Uncut editor Michael Bonner included this album on his list of the best of the year.

I Am Not There Anymore in best-of lists
Outlet	Listing	Rank
AllMusic	AllMusic Best of 2023	—N/a
AllMusic	Favorite Alternative & Indie Albums	—N/a
musicOMH	musicOMH's Top 50 Albums Of 2023	45
NPR Music	The 50 Best Albums of 2023	—N/a
Paste	The 30 Best Rock Albums of 2023	—N/a
PopMatters	The 50 Best Rock Albums of 2023	28
Pitchfork	The 37 Best Rock Albums of 2023	—N/a
Uncut	The 75 Best Albums of 2023	16
Under the Radar	Under the Radar's Top 100 Albums of 2023	68
The Wire	2023 Rewind: Releases of the Year 1–50	17

== Track listing ==
All lyrics by Alasdair MacLean and all music by The Clientele, except where noted

1. "Fables of the Silverlink" (lyrics: Alicia Macanás [Spanish] and MacLean [English], music: The Clientele) – 8:29
2. "Radial B" (Mark Keen) – 0:57
3. "Garden Eye Mantra" – 4:29
4. "Segue 4 (iv)" – 0:28
5. "Lady Grey" – 3:17
6. "Dying in May" – 4:30
7. "Conjuring Summer In" (lyrics: Keen, music: The Clientele) – 2:18
8. "Radial C (Nocturne for Three Trees)" (Keen) – 1:33
9. "Blue Over Blue" – 3:17
10. "Radial E" (Keen) – 1:11
11. "Claire's Not Real" – 2:32
12. "My Childhood" (MacLean) – 2:39
13. "Chalk Flowers" – 4:41
14. "Radial H" (Keen) – 1:07
15. "Hey Siobhan" – 4:13
16. "Stems of Anise" – 4:08
17. "Through the Roses" – 4:02
18. "I Dreamed of You, Maria" – 4:51
19. "The Village Is Always on Fire" – 4:22

== Personnel ==
The Clientele

- James Hornsey – bass guitar, piano
- Mark Keen – drums, percussion, piano, celesta, horn and string arrangement
- Alasdair MacLean – guitar, vocals, tapes, beats, bouzouki, Mellotron, organ, horn and string arrangement, artwork

Additional personnel

- Kameda Bōsai – artwork
- Ruth Elder – violin
- Daniel Evans – extra drums on "Blue Over Blue"
- Sarah Field – trumpet
- Jessica Griffin – spoken word vocals
- Alicia Macanás – arrangement, Spanish vocals on "Fables of the Silverlink"
- Sebastian Millett – cello
- Daniel Murphy – design
- Simon Nelson – assistant engineering
- Stella Page – viola
- Non Peters – violin
- Brian O'Shaughnessy – assistant engineering
- Dave Oxley – horn
- Marco Pasquariello – assistant engineering
- Christopher Taylor – score, guidance

== See also ==
- 2023 in British music
- List of 2023 albums
