= God Save The Clientele =

Studio album by the Clientele
- Released: 8 May 2007 (U.S.); 17 September 2007 (UK)
- Recorded: Nashville, Tennessee
- Genre: Indie pop
- Length: 43:56
- Labels: Merge, Track & Field
- Producer: Mark Nevers

The Clientele chronology
It's Art, Dad (2005)	God Save The Clientele (2007)	That Night a Forest Grew (2008)

Singles from God Save The Clientele
- 1. "Bookshop Casanova" Released: April 2007

Professional ratings
Review scores
Source	Rating
AllMusic	link
Exclaim!	link
Okayplayer	(89/100) link
Pitchfork	(8.3/10) link
PopMatters	(6/10) link
Slant Magazine	link
Spin	link
Stylus Magazine	(B) link
Tiny Mix Tapes	link

God Save The Clientele is the fourth studio album by British indiepop band the Clientele. Recorded in Nashville, Tennessee, it broadens the band's palette through the use of pedal steel and slide guitar. The album is also the first to feature Mel Draisey as the official fourth member of the band. Pat Sansone of Wilco plays on the majority of the songs on God Save The Clientele. It was released on Merge Records on 8 May 2007 in the US, although it leaked onto the internet in March 2007. It was released in the UK in September 2007 by The Track & Field Organisation.

"Bookshop Casanova" was released as a single in the US but no single was released in other territories.

== Track listing ==
1. "Here Comes the Phantom" – 3:13
2. "I Hope I Know You" – 3:19
3. "Isn't Life Strange?" – 3:47
4. "The Dance of the Hours" – 2:08
5. "From Brighton Beach to Santa Monica" – 3:52
6. "Winter on Victoria Street" – 2:47
7. "The Queen of Seville" – 4:27
8. "These Days Nothing but Sunshine" – 3:25
9. "Somebody Changed" – 2:41
10. "No Dreams Last Night" – 3:05
11. "Carnival on 7th Street" – 2:09
12. "Bookshop Casanova" – 3:53
13. "The Garden at Night" – 1:44
14. "Dreams of Leaving" – 3:26

== Charts ==
=== Album ===
Year	Chart	Position
2007	Billboard Top Heatseekers	19
2007	Billboard Top Independent Albums	48
