= A Fading Summer =

EP by the Clientele
- Released: 23 May 2000 (Re-issued in 2003)
- Genre: Indie pop
- Length: 12:54
- Labels: March, Merge (re-issue)
- Producer: The Clientele

The Clientele chronology
A Fading Summer (2000)	Suburban Light (2000)

Professional ratings
Review scores
Source	Rating
AllMusic	3.5/5 stars
Pitchfork	5/10

A Fading Summer is an EP by the Clientele. The EP was issued in 2000 on March Records. It was re-issued in 2003 on Merge Records.

== Track listing ==
No.	Title	Length
1.	"An Hour Before the Light"	2:32
2.	"Driving South"	4:52
3.	"Bicycles"	2:21
4.	"Saturday"	3:49
