= Suburban Light =

Studio album by the Clientele
- Released: 28 November 2000
- Recorded: 1997–2000
- Genres: Indie pop; dream pop
- Length: 44:15
- Label: Pointy
- Producer: The Clientele

The Clientele chronology
A Fading Summer (2000)	Suburban Light (2000)	Lost Weekend (2002)

Singles from Suburban Light
- 1. "What Goes Up" / "Five Day Morning" Released: June 1998; 2. "Reflections After Jane" / "An Hour Before the Light" Released: March 1999; 3. "Lacewings" / "Saturday" Released: September 1999; 4. "I Had to Say This" / "Monday's Rain" Released: December 1999; 5. "(I Want You) More Than Ever" / "6AM Morningside" Released: February 2000

Suburban Light is the debut studio album by English indie pop band the Clientele. The album was released on 28 November 2000 by Pointy Records in the United Kingdom. In 2001, it was released by Merge Records in the United States. Suburban Light contains several tracks originally released on singles and compilations from 1997 through 2000, causing some websites such as Pitchfork to label it a compilation album.

== Release ==
The track "We Could Walk Together" first appeared on the Fierce Panda Records compilation Cry Me a Liver in November 1997. Several other tracks were issued as 7-inch singles across various labels: "What Goes Up" / "Five Day Morning" on Pointy Records in June 1998, "Reflections After Jane" / "An Hour Before the Light" on Johnny Kane Records in March 1999, "Lacewings" / "Saturday" on Motorway Records in September 1999, "I Had to Say This" / "Monday's Rain" on Pointy Records in December 1999, and "(I Want You) More Than Ever" / "6AM Morningside" on Elefant Records in February 2000. "Bicycles" first appeared on the March Records EP A Fading Summer in May 2000.

== Critical reception ==
Professional ratings
Review scores
Source	Rating
AllMusic	4/5 stars
Entertainment Weekly	A−
The Guardian	4/5 stars
Pitchfork	9.1/10
PopMatters	9/10
Spin	7/10
Under the Radar	8/10

In 2009, Suburban Light was ranked at number 80 on Pitchfork's list of the best albums of the 2000s. In 2018, Pitchfork listed it at number 21 on its list of the 30 best dream pop albums.

== Track listing ==
All tracks are written by Alasdair MacLean and James Hornsey.

Pointy Records release
No.	Title	Length
1.	"I Had to Say This"	3:34
2.	"Rain"	2:34
3.	"Reflections After Jane"	3:21
4.	"We Could Walk Together"	2:34
5.	"Monday's Rain"	5:05
6.	"Joseph Cornell"	2:23
7.	"An Hour Before the Light"	2:30
8.	"(I Want You) More Than Ever"	3:03
9.	"Saturday"	3:52
10.	"Five Day Morning"	4:08
11.	"Bicycles"	2:14
12.	"As Night Is Falling"	5:13
13.	"Lacewings"	3:44
Total length:		44:15

Merge Records release
No.	Title	Length
1.	"I Had to Say This"	3:34
2.	"Rain"	2:34
3.	"Reflections After Jane"	3:21
4.	"We Could Walk Together"	2:34
5.	"Monday's Rain"	5:05
6.	"Joseph Cornell"	2:23
7.	"What Goes Up"	3:35
8.	"(I Want You) More Than Ever"	3:03
9.	"6AM Morningside"	1:51
10.	"Five Day Morning"	4:08
11.	"From a Window"	2:40
12.	"As Night Is Falling"	5:13
13.	"Lacewings"	3:44
Total length:		43:45

== Personnel ==
Credits for Suburban Light adapted from album liner notes.

The Clientele

- Alasdair MacLean – vocals, guitar
- James Hornsey – bass
- Mark Keen – drums

Additional musicians

- Daniel Evans – drums
- Howard Monk – drums

Artwork and design

- Seonad MacLean – photography
- Marianna Parker – photography
- Basia Taboda – sleeve design
