= Salon des Refusés (album) =

Studio album by George Pringle
- Released: 7 September 2009
- Recorded: 2006–2009
- Genre: Minimal
- Label: Deth to Fals Metal Records
- Producer: George Pringle

Singles from Salon des Refusés
- 1. "Physical Education (part 1)" Released: August 16, 2009

Professional ratings
Review scores
Source	Rating
Culturedeluxe	(8/10)

Salon des Refusés is George Pringle's debut album, released on 7 September 2009 by her own record label Deth to Fals Metal Records. Demos for most of the songs on the album had appeared on George's Myspace prior to the album's release.

== Track listing ==
1. "Big Screen Kiss Scene"
2. "We could have been heroes..."
3. "Carte Postale"
4. "Sparkomatic Miami"
5. "Physical Education (part 1)"
6. "LCD I love you but you're bringing me down..."
7. "Fellini for Prime Minister"
8. "Bonjour Tristesse"
9. "Pop Hit"
10. "One night in KOKO"
11. "Extremely verbal after midnight"
12. "S.W.10"

== Singles ==
- Pop Hit was released on limited edition Vinyl and as an MP3 single on iTunes and AmazonMP3.
- Physical Education was released on iTunes and AmazonMP3 along with an Instrumental version of the song.
