= Leigh-On-Sea (song) =

Single by Assembly Now
- Released: 29 January 2007
- Recorded: 2006
- Genre: Indie rock
- Length: 5:20
- Label: Fandango
- Producer(s): John Fortis, Howard Gray

"Leigh-On-Sea" is the second single by British rock band Assembly Now. It was released on 29 January 2007 on independent label Label Fandango, run by the people behind Club Fandango. It is a limited edition vinyl single of only 700 copies, which sold out in its first week.

== Track listing ==
1. "Leigh-On-Sea" – 2:22
2. "Tenement (Demo)" – 2:58

== Critical reception ==
Chris Reynolds of Gigwise.com awarded the single 4.5/5 stars, calling the single "a new high" and "jerky, fast paced and exciting not to mention supremely catchy". Maps magazine was also enthusiastic, calling it "Two and a half minutes of furious foot tapping, radio-friendly brilliance with a skronky guitar breakdown and Xylophone chimes chucked in for good measure". John Sakamoto of the Toronto Star called it "the most exhilarating 2:22 of the week". Daniel Ross of Drowned in Sound, meanwhile, gave the single a 5/10 rating, opining that the band "sound in dire need of a few months in glorious isolation, somewhere where they can purge themselves of their flailing clutches at influences". Gareth K. Vile of The Skinny was also not impressed, and in his view the single lacked "much sincere urgency, originality or imagination".

== Miscellanea ==
"Leigh-On-Sea" won BBC 6 Music's Rebel Playlist competition with the highest number of listener votes in the poll's history, according to host Steve Lamacq.
