= The Rumour Said Fire =

Danish band

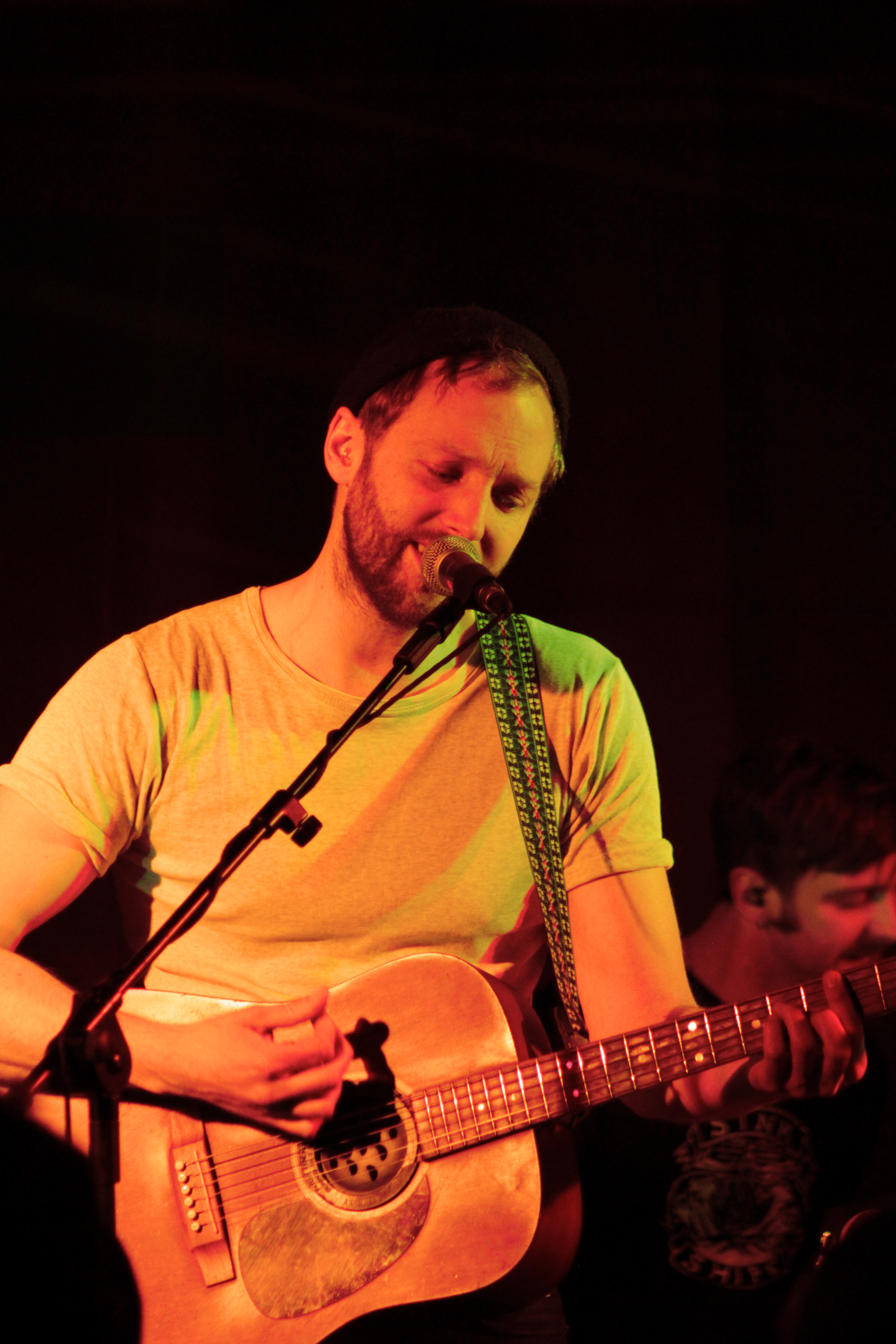
- The Rumour Said Fire in Hadsten 2013. Photo: Jonas Søby

Background information
- Origin: Copenhagen, Denmark
- Genres: Folk, indie
- Years active: 2008 -
- Labels: A:larm Music
- Members: Jesper Lidang; Christian Rindorf; Søren Lilholt; Kasper Nissen

The Rumour Said Fire is a Danish band, founded in 2008 by singer, songwriter and guitarist Jesper Lidang.

== History ==
The group performed for the first time together in May 2008 and opened in 2009 for Passion Pit in Copenhagen.

The group released the single Evil Son in August 2009, followed by their debut EP The Life and Death of a Male Body 21 September 2009. In October the subsequent single The Balcony, was released.

The group won the P3 Guld prize in the category "The P3 Talent 2009."

On 20 September 2010 The Rumour Said Fire released the single Sentimentally Falling, from their second album The Arrogant, which was released in October 2010. The single was on P3's Uungåelige.

Their single The Balcony has received modest airplay in Denmark.

== Discography ==
=== Studio album ===
- 2010: The Arrogant
- 2012: Dead Ends
- 2017: Crush

=== EPs ===
- 2009: The Life and Death of a Male Body
- 2022: Det nye Forår

=== Singles ===
- 2009: Evil Son
- 2009: The Balcony
- 2010: Sentimentally Falling
- 2010: Passion
- 2012: Dead Leaves
- 2013: Voyager
- 2017: Television Personalities
- 2017: Out of the Way
- 2019: Retaliation
