= Shooting Star (Air Traffic song) =

Single by Air Traffic

from the album Fractured Life
- Released: 18 June 2007
- Genre: Indie rock
- Length: 4:08
- Label: Tiny Consumer
- Songwriter(s): Chris Wall, David Ryan Jordan, Tom Pritchard and Jim Maddock

Air Traffic singles chronology
"Charlotte" (2007)	"Shooting Star" (2007)	"No More Running Away" (2007)

"Shooting Star" is a single by English indie rock band Air Traffic. It was the second single released from the band's debut album, Fractured Life. It was released on 18 June 2007 and reached a peak position of #30 on the UK Singles Chart.

The track was also used in the opening credits of MTV reality show Living on the Edge, the UK advert for Davidoff Cool Water and the YouTube reality show The Suburbs. It has also been used in an introduction movie for the Phantom Coupe on the Rolls-Royce Motorcars website . It has also featured in the latest promotional video for UK-based power distribution operator UK Power Networks.

== Charts ==
Chart	Peak position
UK Singles Chart	30
Belgium Singles Chart	36

== Track listing ==
CD

1. "Shooting Star" (4:08)
2. "This Old Town" (3:38)
3. "Left Out In the Rain" (2:54)
4. "Shooting Star" (4:08)

== Alternative covers ==
7" vinyl #1

7" vinyl #2
