= Federico de Vinciolo =

16th-century lace-maker and pattern designer

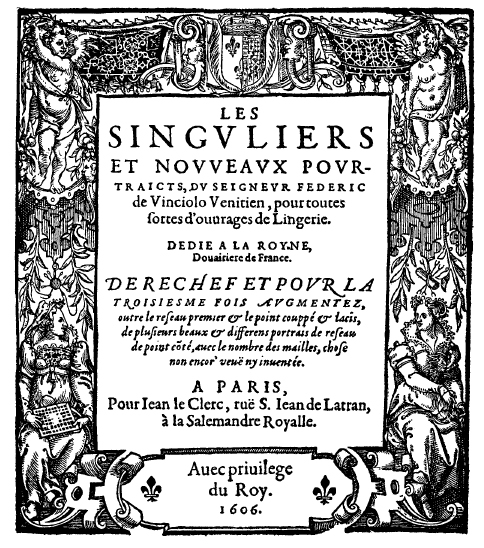
Title page to 1609 edition of Les Singuliers

Federico de Vinciolo or Federico Vinciolo was a sixteenth-century lace-maker and pattern designer attached to the court of Henry II of France. He was granted a monopoly on manufacturing lace ruffs in France.

His book of needlework patterns, Les Singuliers et Nouveaux Pourtaicts, was published in many editions between 1587 and 1623.

An unabridged reprint of a 1909 facsimile of this book was issued by Dover Books as Renaissance Patterns for Lace, Embroidery and Needlepoint in 1971.
