= Not Squares =

Irish band

- Origin: Northern Ireland, United Kingdom
- Genres: Electronic
- Labels: Richter Collective; Teto Records; Strange Brew
- Members: Ricki O'Rawe; Michael Kinloch; Keith Winter

Not Squares was an Irish electronic dance-punk band from Belfast. The band grew out of the alternative music scene that flourished in Northern Ireland in the years after the Good Friday Agreement.

== History ==
Not Squares formed in Belfast in 2008, initially as a four-piece consisting of Michael Kinloch (vocals, bass, synths), Keith Winter (vocals, drums, synths), Ricki O’Rawe (vocals, bass, synths), and Rachel Keenan (vocals, synths) The band combined elements of punk and dance music, a sound captured on their early E.P. WROK and their debut album Yeah OK. When Keenan left the band in 2010, the band moved in a more electronic direction, a shift that culminated in the poppier club tracks that make up Bolts.

=== Yeah OK ===
Not Squares debut album Yeah OK was released by Dublin-based cult label the Richter Collective in November 2010. The reception was mixed in the UK and in Ireland.

=== Bolts ===
The bands second album Bolts was released on Strange Bew on 30th March 2015. Bolts was shortlisted for the Northern Ireland Music Prize for Best Album.

== Radio live sessions ==
The band recorded a number of sessions for the BBC. In 2009 they recorded a session for BBC Radio 1 at Maida Vale Studios, which was broadcast on the Huw Stephens show. In 2010, they recorded a session for the RTÉ show Arena, while in 2015, they recorded a full electric session for Across the Line on Radio Ulster, recording tracks from 'Bolts' and a cover of the Dinosaur L's 'Go Bang'.

== Live shows ==
Between 2008 and 2015 the band toured across the UK, Ireland, Europe, and Asia, and played major festivals across Ireland and the UK, including Glastonbury, Reading and Leeds, Latitude, and Electric Picnic.

== Discography ==
=== Albums ===
- Yeah OK (2010)
- Bolts (2015)

=== E.P.s ===
- WROK (2009)
