= Air Traffic =

English alternative rock band

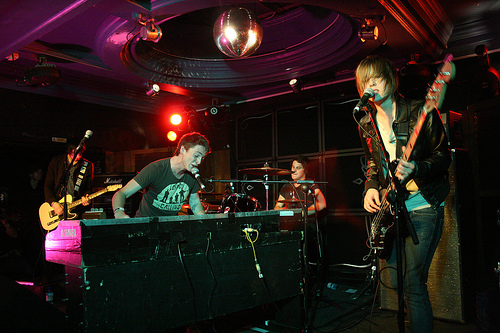
Air Traffic at the Luminaire in London in 2007

Air Traffic are an English alternative rock band from Bournemouth signed to EMI Records. Formed in 2003, the band consists of Chris Wall (piano, lead vocals), David Ryan Jordan (Drums), Tom Pritchard (guitar) and Jim Maddock (bass guitar).

The band's name originated from when they used to rehearse in an industrial unit next to Hurn Airport, where air traffic control signals could be picked up on their amplifiers. Their music features heavy use of piano, and they have been described by NME to be like "Supergrass covering Little Richard". The band have received success with the release of their single "Shooting Star", which debuted at No. 30 in the UK Singles Chart, and the release of their debut album, Fractured Life.

== History ==
=== Formation and Fractured Life (2006–2008) ===
Chris Wall first met David Ryan Jordan and Tom Pritchard whilst studying at school in Bournemouth in 2003. The band moved to London in 2005, they recruited fourth band member Jim Maddock and began looking for a record deal. Their first single, a double-a side of "Just Abuse Me" and "Charlotte", was released on 17 July 2006 through Label Fandango. 500 copies of the single were produced, all of which sold out within a few days of the release date. Following this, the band were signed to major label EMI. The band began to experience some mainstream success after being noticed by Steve Lamacq and Zane Lowe of BBC Radio 1, resulting in airplay on Radio 1, Capital Radio, XFM and Kerrang! Radio.

They spent much of August and September 2006 in Rockfield Studio in Monmouth, Wales, recording material for their debut album. Four of the tracks from these sessions were released as an EP on 30 October 2006, which included the single "Never Even Told Me Her Name" which was Zane Lowe's hottest record in the world for a week on BBC Radio 1.

On 24 November 2006, the band were given their first real television exposure when they appeared on Later With Jools Holland alongside such acts as The Killers and Lucinda Williams. They performed both songs from their first release, "Charlotte" and "Just Abuse Me". Later in the year, the band supported Snow Patrol on their UK arena tour. The band were also nominated in the BBC Sound of 2007 poll.

The band re-released "Charlotte" on 26 March 2007. This marked the band's first move into the charts, with the song reaching number 33 in the UK Singles Chart. The band released their new single, "Shooting Star", on 18 June 2007. The song, prior to its release, met with acclaim; it was Marsha Shandur's (Xfm) and Steve Lamacq's (6 Music) "Single of the Week" for 4–10 June 2007, as well as Vernon Kay's "Weekend Anthem" for 9–10 June 2007, on BBC Radio 1. Their debut album, Fractured Life, was released on 2 July 2007 to critical acclaim and receiving positive reviews across the board. The album was named "Album of the Week" on radio station Original 106 throughout 25 June – 11 July 2007, with several album tracks played all week. A further single, "No More Running Away", was released on 24 September 2007, charting at No. 45.

Air Traffic were one of ten nominees for the 2007 Xfm New Music Award. They attended and played at a ceremony at London's KOKO on 16 January 2008, with The Enemy being the eventual winners. They released non-album single "Come On" on 21 January 2008, as part of an exclusive download with Xfm. Whilst the song was included in the American release of the album, it was available to download for free in the United Kingdom. In April the band embarked on their biggest UK tour to date headlining a sold out Shepherd's Bush Empire in London. To support the album's US release, they embarked on a tour with the critically acclaimed Elbow as well their own headline dates. The band also featured on the main stage at the Rock Werchter festival 08 in Belgium alongside R.E.M., Radiohead and Neil Young.

=== Untitled Second Album and David Jordan's departure (2010) ===
The band invited fans to download new track "Ambulate" through email in April 2009, in which they stated that David Jordan had left the band to "pursue other interests". In June, the band played a sold out, seven date tour of the United Kingdom, including shows at London's Borderline, Manchester's Deaf Institute and a small hometown warm up show. On 1 November 2009 another demo track was sent to subscribed fans of the website, entitled "Maniac".

=== Hiatus (2010) ===
In September 2010, the remaining 3 members announced on the band's official website that they are "taking a break from being a band for a while to try other things" suggesting that the band has split. In February 2014, the band released an update, which included a link to a previously unreleased demo, "Take Your Hands Off Me".

=== (2017) ===
In February 2017, the band's social media accounts became active once more, advising of an impending announcement. On Sunday 19 February, the 4 original members confirmed they were to play a series of shows in October 2017 to celebrate 10 years since the release of Fractured Life. The band sold out London Scala and 3 nights in a row at Het Depot, Belgium in less than 24 hours. The band added another London show due to phenomenal demand at The Islington Assembly Hall and shows in Holland, Manchester, Glasgow, and Birmingham. On the night of their last show in UK of the tour, they announced they will be touring again in April 2018. The band announced shows at Bournemouth Firestation, London KOKO and 2 shows at Ancienne Belgique in Brussels. On 6 July 2018, the band performed on the main stage in front of 60,000 people at Rock Werchter Festival alongside The Killers, Gorillaz, Pearl Jam, and Snow Patrol.

(2026)

In September 2026, the band resurfaced on social media for the first time since early 2022, teasing the 20th anniversary of their debut album, Fractured Life, with various photos from their 2006 shows, promotions, and studio sessions. On Thursday 17 September, the band announced a vinyl re-issue and expanded CD of the album alongside three tour dates in Amsterdam, Brussels, and London for April 2027.

== Discography ==
=== Studio albums ===
Year	Album details	Charts		
Year	Album details	UK	BE	NLD
2007	Fractured Life: Released: 2 July 2007; Label: EMI; Formats: LP, CD, digital download	42	27	71

=== Extended plays ===
Year	Album details
2006	Never Even Told Me Her Name: Released: 30 October 2006; Label: Tiny Consumer

=== Singles ===
Year	Single	Peak chart positions		Album
Year	Single	UK	BEL	Album
2006	"Just Abuse Me" / "Charlotte"	—	—	Non-album release
2007	"Charlotte" (re-release)	33	57	Fractured Life
2007	"Shooting Star"	30	36	Fractured Life
2007	"No More Running Away"	45	29	Fractured Life
2017	"Almost Human"		65	
2019	''Ocean Life''			
"—" denotes did not chart.
