= Nathan Evans =

Nathan Evans may refer to:

- Nathan Evans (politician) (1804–1879), American politician
- Nathan George Evans (1824–1868), American soldier
- Nathan Evans (singer), Scottish singer
- Nathan Evans (rugby union) (born 2002), Welsh rugby union player
