= Andy MacLeod =

Scottish footballer

Personal information
- Full name: Andrew MacLeod
- Date of birth: 14 March 1969 (age 57)
- Place of birth: Glasgow, Scotland
- Position: Striker

Senior career*
Years	Team	Apps	(Gls)
1988–1989	Aberdeen	11	(1)
1990–1991	Fortuna Sittard	32	(10)
1991–1998	Ross County	148	(63)
Total		123	(29)
- * Club domestic league appearances and goals

Andy MacLeod (born 14 March 1969) is a Scottish retired professional footballer, having played for Aberdeen in the Scottish Premier League, Fortuna Sittard in the Dutch Eredivisie, and Ross County in the Highland League. Since retirement from the professional game he played semi professional football at Highland League clubs, (Ross County, Brora Rangers, Wick Academy and Forres Mechanics). Following retirement from football he became a senior manager within the Highland Council.
