= Tim Ten Yen =

English recording artist

tim Ten YEN, also known as "TTY", is an English recording artist. He has been called the "Sensational Singing Salaryman". He was championed by the English disc jockey Steve Lamacq as a "cult figure of the future".

He grew up outside London. His music has been called "devoid of pretention but full of original eccentricity" while the post-punk musician Paul Hawkins has lauded his writing "joyous, catchy and indescribably wonderful songs that are simultaneously utterly universal and entirely unique".

His debut album Everything Beautiful Reminds Me of You was released by Pointy Records in late 2008. That same year saw the release of an EP Runaround Get Around on the Club Fandango label.

His work has been featured in Flux Magazine, Keep It Fast.com, and RadioNowhere's Best of 2008 and was included on Spinner.com "Ten Acts to Watch in 2010" as "a one-man Divine Comedy."

tim Ten YEN has toured with and opened in support of Carter USM and also for the group's lead singer Jim Bob's solo shows. He has played the Reading Festival in 2006 and 2007.
