= Pointy Records =

British independent record label

- Founded: 1998
- Founder: Andy Macleod
- Distributor(s): Shellshock
- Genre: Indie rock, folk rock, post-punk
- Country of origin: United Kingdom
- Location: London, England
- Official website: http://www.pointyrecords.com

Pointy Records is a London-based independent record label, founded in 1998 by Andy Macleod. Largely focusing on new music, Pointy Records have been releasing albums and singles of cult indie bands, most notably The Clientele, Flotation Toy Warning and Yo Zushi, for a period of ten years. A live music promotion wing, Club Fandango, was started with the Fierce Panda label's Simon Williams in 2001. This was later expanded to include a singles-only record label, Label Fandango.

== Roster ==
=== Pointy records ===
- Tim Ten Yen
- The Clientele
- Yo Zushi
- Flotation Toy Warning
- Ladybug Transistor
- Cathead
- Color Filter
- Campag Velocet
- Tall Tree 6ft Man

== See also ==
- Lists of record labels
- List of independent UK record labels
