= Club Fandango =

UK live music promotions company

Coordinates: 51°33′1″N 0°5′49″W

Club Fandango is a live music promotions company based in Highbury, London. It was started in 2001, by Simon Williams and Andy MacLeod. The former runs Fierce Panda records, the latter the Pointy Records label. Williams and MacLeod had previously promoted nights such as Club Spangle!, NME "On" nights, Club Pointy and Club Panda.

Initially promoting every Tuesday night at the Dublin Castle, Camden, Club Fandango soon expanded to regularly put on gigs in other north London venues such as Camden Barfly. On certain nights, Club Fandango teamed up with Rock Sound magazine, the BMI and digital music station BBC 6 Music. There are additional Club Fandango nights in Barnsley, Birmingham, Eastbourne, Glasgow and Manchester.

The first band to headline Club Fandango was Norwich band KaitO. Fandango has promoted many then up-and-coming bands such as The Killers, Arctic Monkeys, Keane, Death Cab For Cutie, Kaiser Chiefs, Bloc Party, Razorlight, and The Polyphonic Spree.

In November 2005, Club Fandango released its first record on the new Label Fandango independent record label - a limited edition run of 500 7" vinyl singles by Welsh band The Hot Puppies. In 2008 the label released tracks by Tim Ten Yen.

The brand used The Bull and Gate from July 2010 until the pub closed as a live venue in 2013.
