= List of songs recorded by Guillemots =

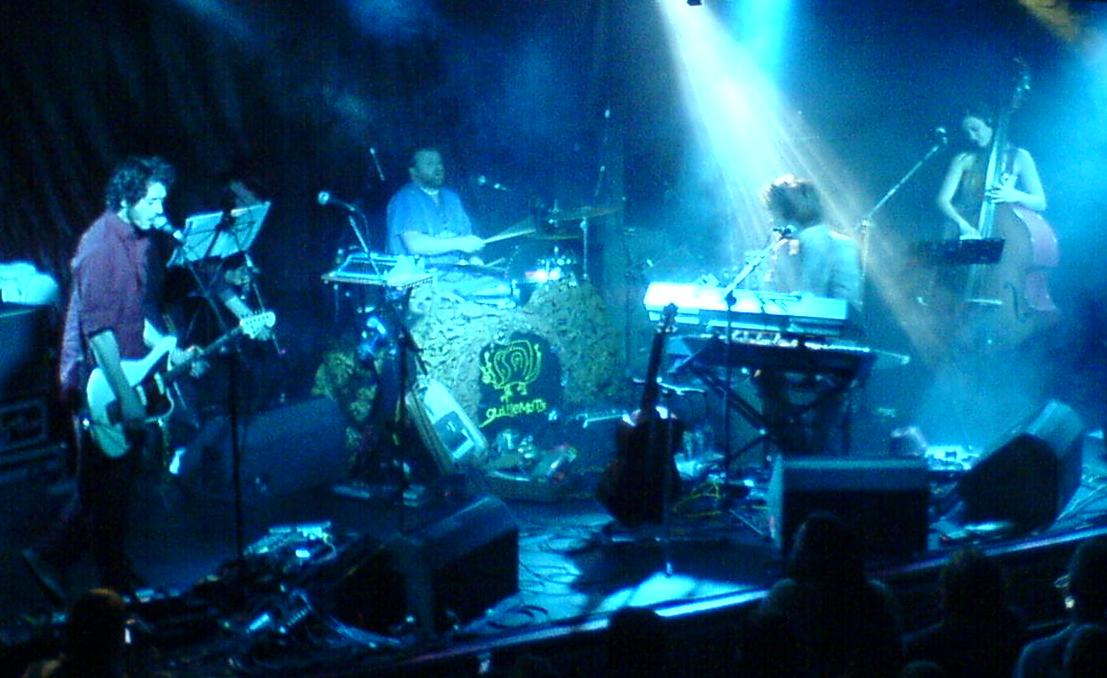
Guillemots performing live in Edinburgh in 2006. Left to right: MC Lord Magrão, Greig Stewart, Fyfe Dangerfield, Aristazabal Hawkes

As of 2018, the indie rock band Guillemots have recorded more than 80 songs for their four studio albums and other official releases. The band was formed in November 2004, with their first official material being I Saw Such Things in My Sleep, an extended play (EP) released in September 2005. The EP contained four songs, including "Made-Up Lovesong #43", a track that would also feature on their first studio album, Through the Windowpane. The release of I Saw Such Things in My Sleep was followed three months later by Guillemots' debut single, "Trains to Brazil". Like "Made-Up Lovesong #43", it was also included on Through the Windowpane, which was released in July 2006. The album's songs were well received by critics: review aggregator Metacritic gave the record a score of 81 out of 100, indicating "universal acclaim". Craig McLean of The Observer described them as "gorgeous tunes that are lithe enough to cope with the little bursts of sonic madness". Two additional tracks were released as singles from the album: "We're Here" and "Annie, Let's Not Wait".

Of the twelve songs on Through the Windowpane, nine were written by lead singer Fyfe Dangerfield. Speaking in 2008, Guillemots member MC Lord Magrão remarked: "For the first album, Fyfe handled most of the songs. ... We worked with him and developed [them]." In October 2006, Guillemots brought out Of the Night, a four-track EP that featured one song written by each member of the band. Eighteen months later, the band released their second album, Red. This album's songs were more pop-orientated than their debut's, and were written by all four members of the group. Magrão explained: "With the second [album], we ended up improvising loads and getting all the new songs from all of the improvised sessions we had." Of the eleven tracks on the record, nine were credited to Guillemots, with the remaining two being credited to Dangerfield alone. Red's songs received less critical acclaim than their debut's; Metacritic awarded the album a score of 60 out of 100, suggesting "mixed or average reviews". Four tracks—"Get Over It", "Falling Out of Reach" and a double A-side of "Kriss Kross" and "Clarion"—were released as singles in the UK.

Guillemots' third album, Walk the River, was released in April 2011. It was the first Guillemots album to feature neither a strings nor brass section – its tracks were described by The Independent as being more "noticeably stripped down" than those of previous releases. Unlike Through the Windowpane and Red, singles from Walk the River were distributed exclusively online, with no accompanying physical release. Reviews were generally favourable, with Metacritic reporting a score of 69 out of 100 for the record. Three singles were taken from the album: "The Basket", "I Must Be a Lover" and "I Don't Feel Amazing Now". On 7 May 2012, the band announced their intention to release four albums during the year, each representing a different season – the first, Hello Land!, was released through Greedbag the same day.

== Songs ==
=== Released ===
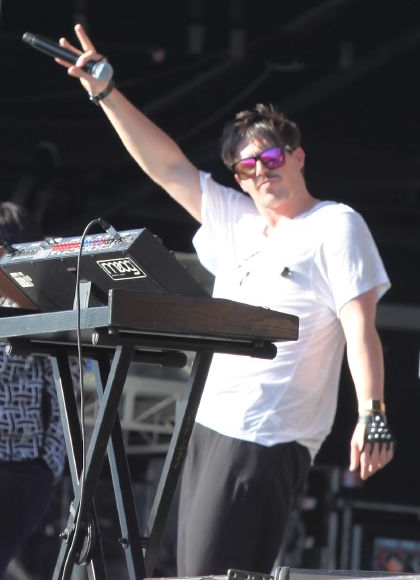
Sam Sparro's single "Black and Gold" was covered by Guillemots in 2008, and included on the release of "Kriss Kross" / "Clarion".

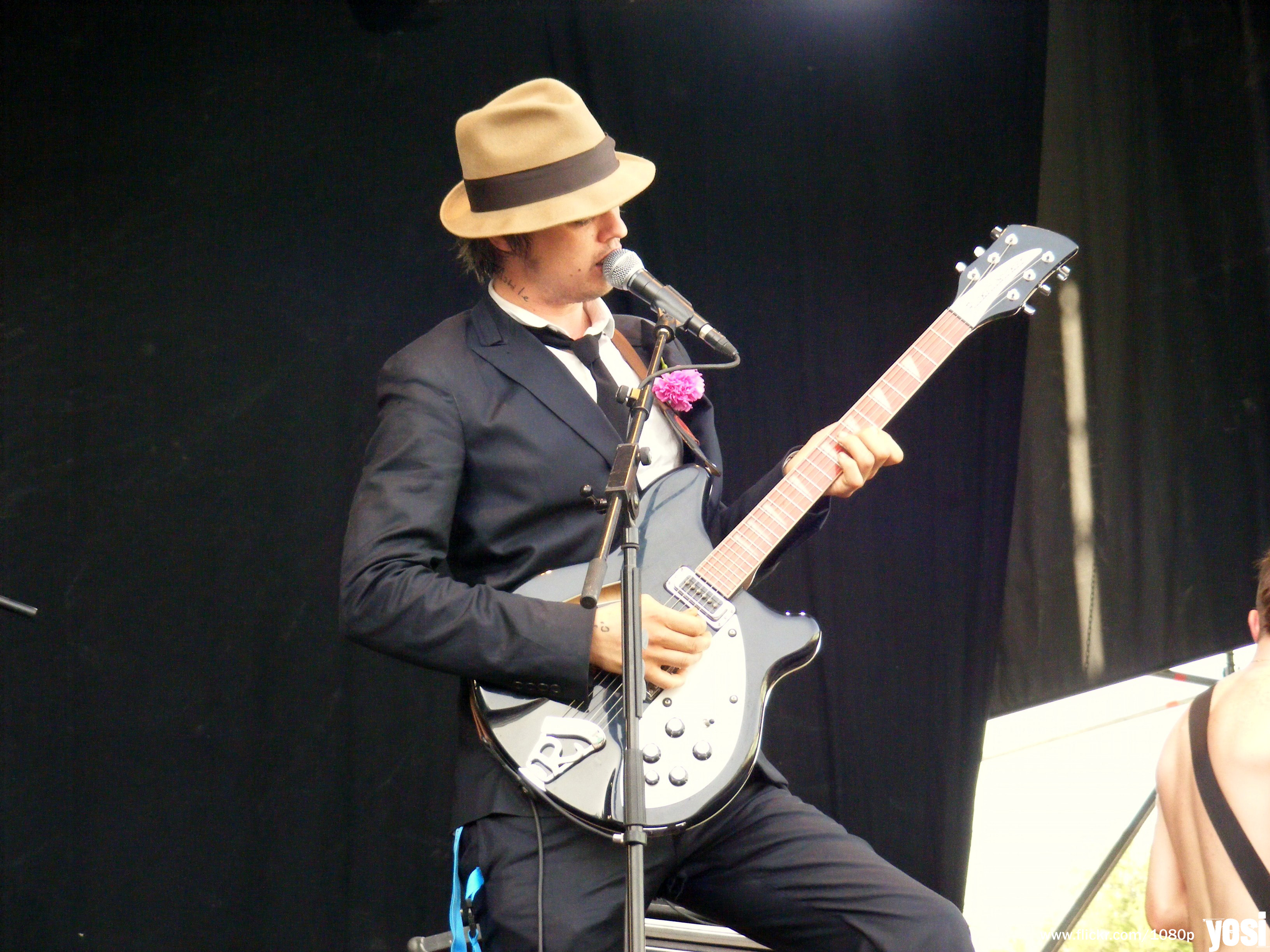
Guillemots featured as guest vocalists on Babyshambles's "Janie Jones (Strummerville)" (Babyshambles lead singer Pete Doherty pictured).

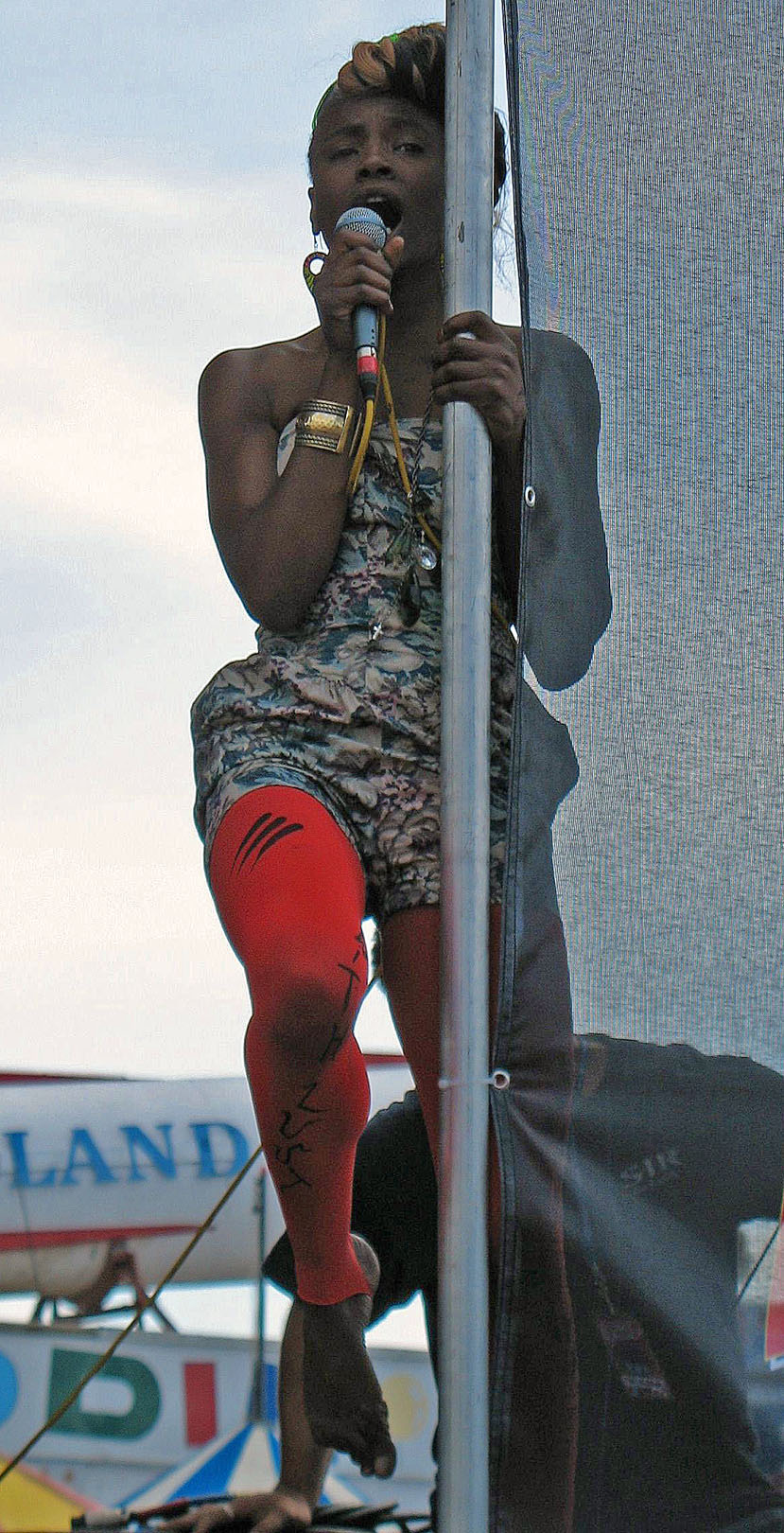
Shingai Shoniwa provided backing vocals on Guillemots' 2006 single "Made-Up Lovesong #43".

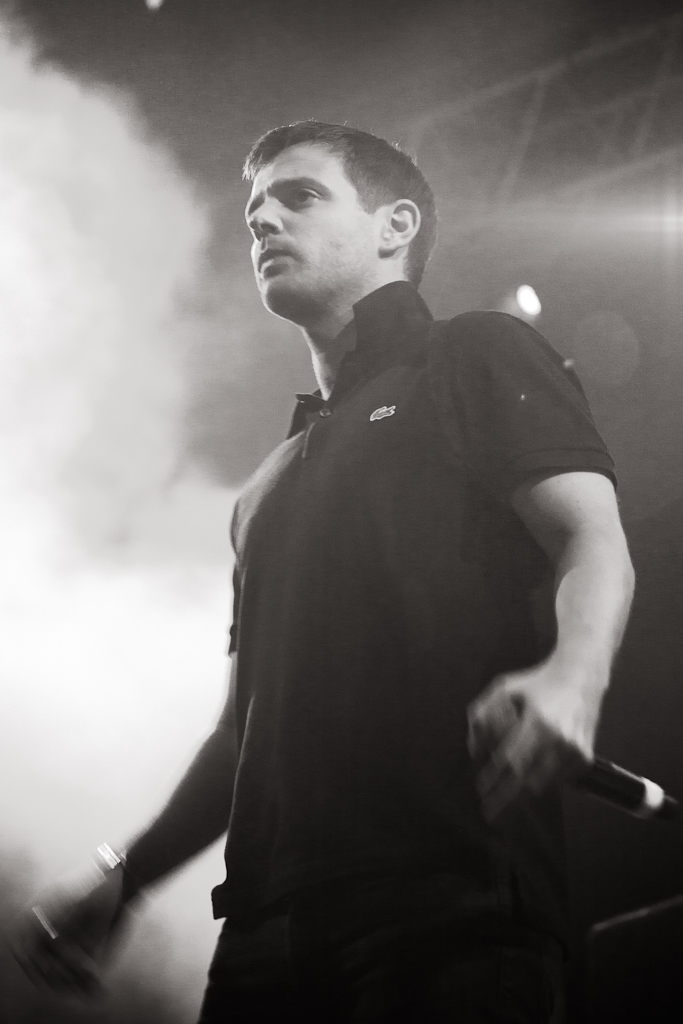
The Streets' single "Never Went to Church" featured a version by Guillemots on its official release (The Streets lead singer Mike Skinner pictured).

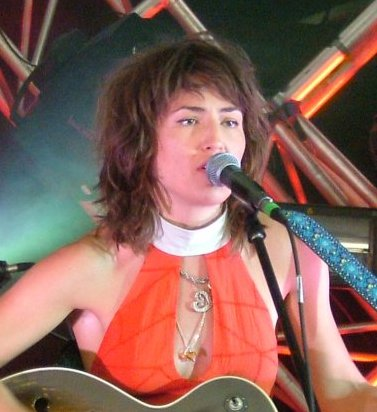
American singer Joan Wasser sang and played violin on "Redwings", a track from Guillemots' debut, Through the Windowpane.

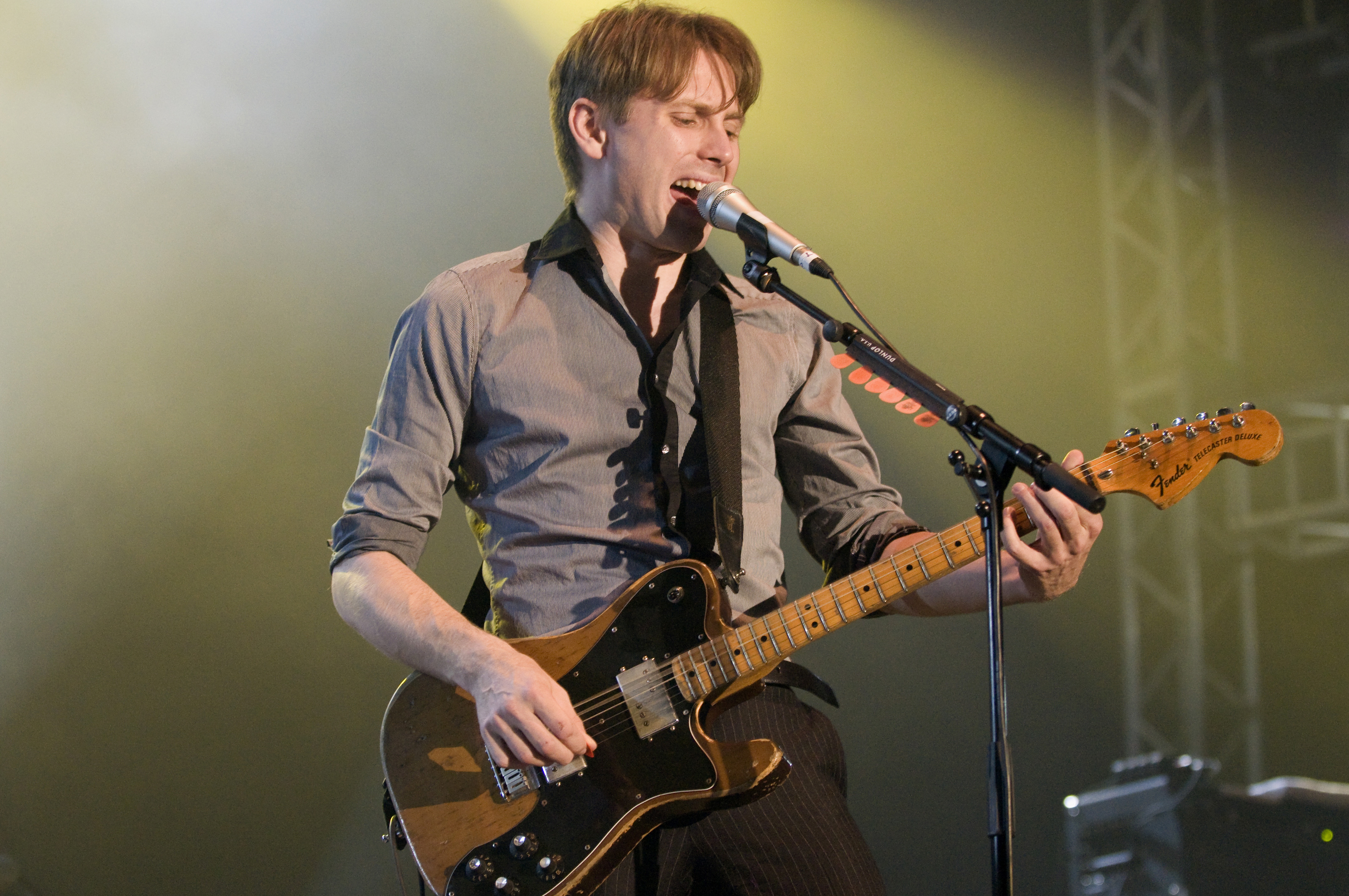
Guillemots' cover of "Take Me Out" by Franz Ferdinand (lead singer Alex Kapranos pictured) was included as a B-side on their single "Annie, Let's Not Wait".

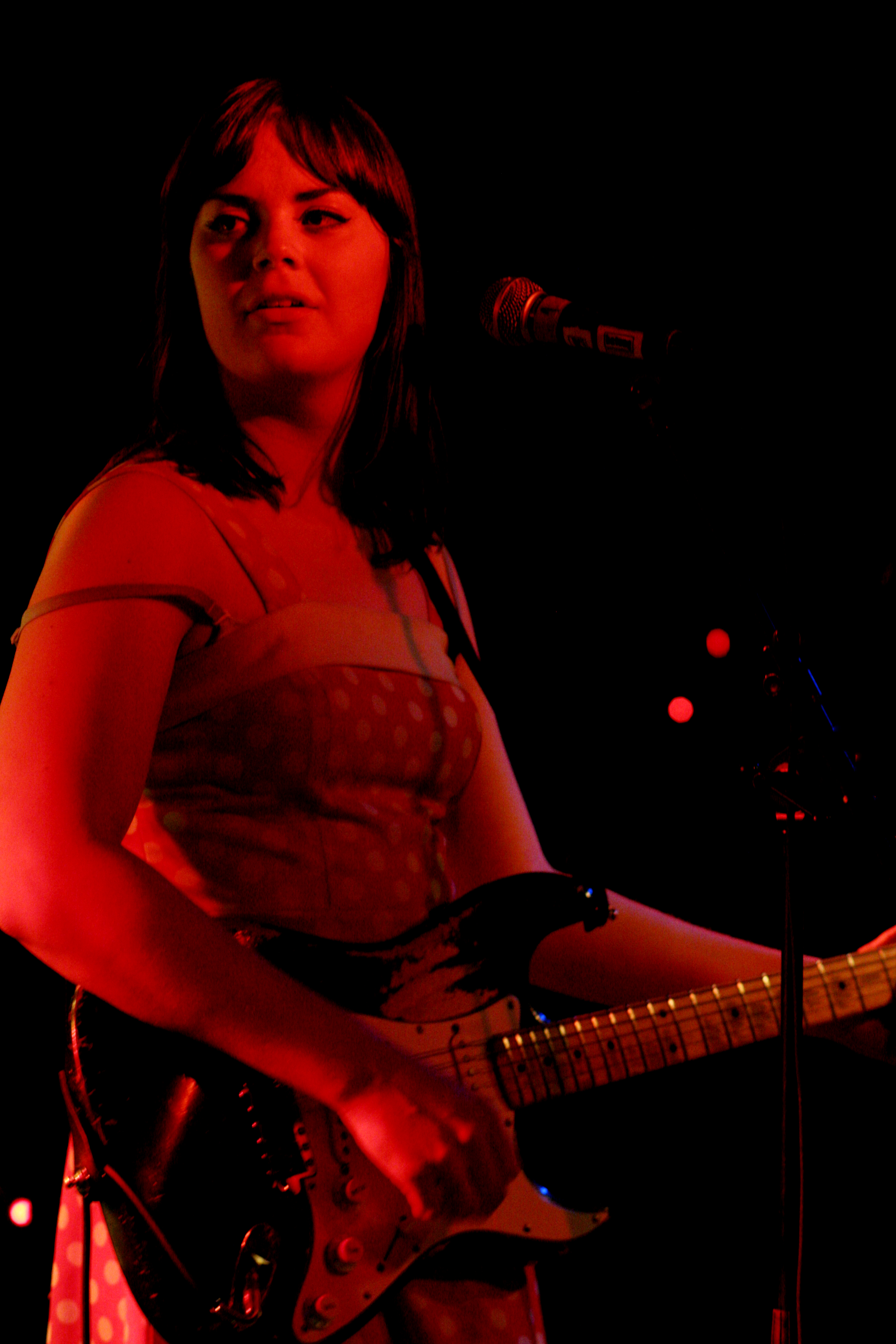
Norwegian musician Ida Maria provided vocals for the track "Words" from Guillemots' 2008 album Red.

All songs credited to Guillemots, except where noted.

Key
†	Released as a single

Released songs by Guillemots
Song	Writer(s)	Original release	Year	Ref.
"All the People Say"	Fyfe Dangerfield	"Trains to Brazil" (re-release)	2006	
"And If All..."	Guillemots	Through the Windowpane	2006	
"Annie, Let's Not Wait" †	Fyfe Dangerfield	Through the Windowpane	2006	
"Bad Boyfriend"	Greig Stewart; Guillemots	Of the Night	2006	
"The Basket" †	Guillemots	Walk the River	2011	
"Big Dog"	Guillemots	Red	2008	
"Black and Gold"	Sam Falson; Jesse Rogg	"Kriss Kross" / "Clarion"	2008	
"Blue Eyes"	MC Lord Magrão	"Trains to Brazil" (re-release)	2006	
"Blue Would Still Be Blue"	Fyfe Dangerfield	Through the Windowpane	2006	
"Burnt"	Fyfe Dangerfield	"We're Here"	2006	
"By the Water"	Aristazabal Hawkes	Of the Night	2006	
"Byebyeland"	Guillemots; Jonas Raabe	Hello Land!	2012	
"Cats Eyes"	Fyfe Dangerfield	I Saw Such Things in My Sleep EP	2005	
"Clarion" †	Fyfe Dangerfield	Red	2008	
"Cockateels"	Fyfe Dangerfield	Red	2008	
"Come Away with Me"	Guillemots	Through the Windowpane	2006	
"Dancing in the Devil's Shoes"	Fyfe Dangerfield	Walk the River	2011	
"Don't Look Down"	Guillemots	Red	2008	
"The Dormouse and the Meerkat"	Guillemots	"Made-Up Lovesong #43"	2006	
"Dunes (mix 1)"	Fyfe Dangerfield	"Made-Up Lovesong #43"	2006	
"The Face We Deserve"	Guillemots	"Falling Out of Reach"	2008	
"Falling Out of Reach" †	Guillemots	Red	2008	
"Falling Over My Feet"	Guillemots	"We're Here"	2006	
"Fishbone for a Drink"	Guillemots	"Kriss Kross" / "Clarion"	2008	
"Fleet" †	Guillemots; Jonas Raabe	Hello Land!	2012	
"Get Over It" †	Guillemots	"Get Over It"	2008	
"Go Away"	Guillemots	"Trains to Brazil"	2005	
"I Don't Feel Amazing Now" †	Fyfe Dangerfield; Guillemots	Walk the River	2011	
"I Lie Down"	Guillemots; Jonas Raabe	Hello Land!	2012	
"I Must Be a Lover" †	Fyfe Dangerfield; Aristazabal Hawkes	Walk the River	2011	
"I've Got a Problem (And the Problem Is You)/Turn the Candles On"	Guillemots	"We're Here"	2006	
"Ice Room"	Guillemots	Walk the River	2011	
"If the World Ends"	Fyfe Dangerfield	Through the Windowpane	2006	
"In Your Arms"	Aristazabal Hawkes; MC Lord Magrão; Freakshow	"Annie, Let's Not Wait"	2007	
"Inside"	Guillemots	Walk the River	2011	
"Janie Jones (Strummerville)" (Babyshambles & Friends) †	Joe Strummer; Mick Jones	"Janie Jones (Strummerville)"	2006	
"Kriss Kross" †	Guillemots	Red	2008	
"Last Kiss"	Guillemots	Red	2008	
"Little Bear"	Fyfe Dangerfield	Through the Windowpane	2006	
"Made-Up Lovesong #43" †	Fyfe Dangerfield	I Saw Such Things in My Sleep EP	2005	
"Me Diz"	Guillemots	"Get Over It"	2008	
"Monotonia"	MC Lord Magrão	"We're Here"	2006	
"Moonlight"	Unknown	From the Cliffs	2006	
"My Chosen One"	Fyfe Dangerfield	"Trains to Brazil"	2005	
"Never Went to Church"	Mike Skinner	"Never Went to Church"	2006	
"Nothing You Feel Is True"	Unknown	Walk the River	2011	
"Nothing's Going to Bring Me Down"	Guillemots	Hello Land!	2012	
"Outside"	Guillemots	Hello Land!	2012	
"Over the Stairs"	Fyfe Dangerfield	I Saw Such Things in My Sleep EP	2005	
"Pa Moila"	Unknown	From the Cliffs	2006	
"Photograph"	Fyfe Dangerfield	"Annie, Let's Not Wait"	2007	
"Redwings"	Fyfe Dangerfield	Through the Windowpane	2006	
"The Rising Tide"	Fyfe Dangerfield	Of the Night	2006	
"Sake"	Fyfe Dangerfield	From the Cliffs	2006	
"São Paulo"	Guillemots	Through the Windowpane	2006	
"Sea Out"	Guillemots	iTunes Store exclusive	2008	
"She's Evil"	MC Lord Magrão; Monstro	Of the Night	2006	
"Slow Train"	Fyfe Dangerfield; Guillemots	Walk the River	2011	
"Sometimes I Remember Wrong"	Fyfe Dangerfield; Guillemots	Walk the River	2011	
"Southern Winds"	Fyfe Dangerfield	Hello Land!	2012	
"Spring Bells"	MC Lord Magrão; Fyfe Dangerfield	Hello Land!	2012	
"Standing on the Last Star"	Guillemots	Red	2008	
"Take Me Home"	Guillemots	Red	2008	
"Take Me Out"	Alex Kapranos; Nick McCarthy	"Annie, Let's Not Wait"	2007	
"This Is the Last Ride Tonight"	Guillemots	"Get Over It"	2008	
"Through the Windowpane"	Fyfe Dangerfield	Through the Windowpane	2006	
"Throw Me a Sun"	Guillemots	"Get Over It"	2008	
"Tigers"	Guillemots	Walk the River	2011	
"Trains to Brazil" †	Fyfe Dangerfield	"Trains to Brazil"	2005	
"Trick of the Light"	Guillemots	"Falling Out of Reach"	2008	
"Up on the Ride"	Guillemots; Jonas Raabe	Hello Land!	2012	
"Vermillion"	Fyfe Dangerfield	Walk the River	2011	
"Walk the River"	Guillemots	Walk the River	2011	
"We're Here" †	Fyfe Dangerfield	"We're Here"	2006	
"What We Have"	Guillemots	"Get Over It"	2008	
"White Rag"	Fyfe Dangerfield	"Trains to Brazil" (re-release)	2006	
"Who Left the Lights Off, Baby?"	Fyfe Dangerfield	I Saw Such Things in My Sleep EP	2005	
"Witch Doctor"	Guillemots	"Trains to Brazil" (re-release)	2006	
"Woody Brown River"	Fyfe Dangerfield	"Made-Up Lovesong #43"	2006	
"Words"	Guillemots	Red	2008	
"Yesterday Is Dead"	Fyfe Dangerfield	Walk the River	2011	
"You Can Look (But You Can't Touch)" (Guillemots featuring Freakshow)	Guillemots	"Trains to Brazil" (re-release)	2006	

=== Unreleased ===
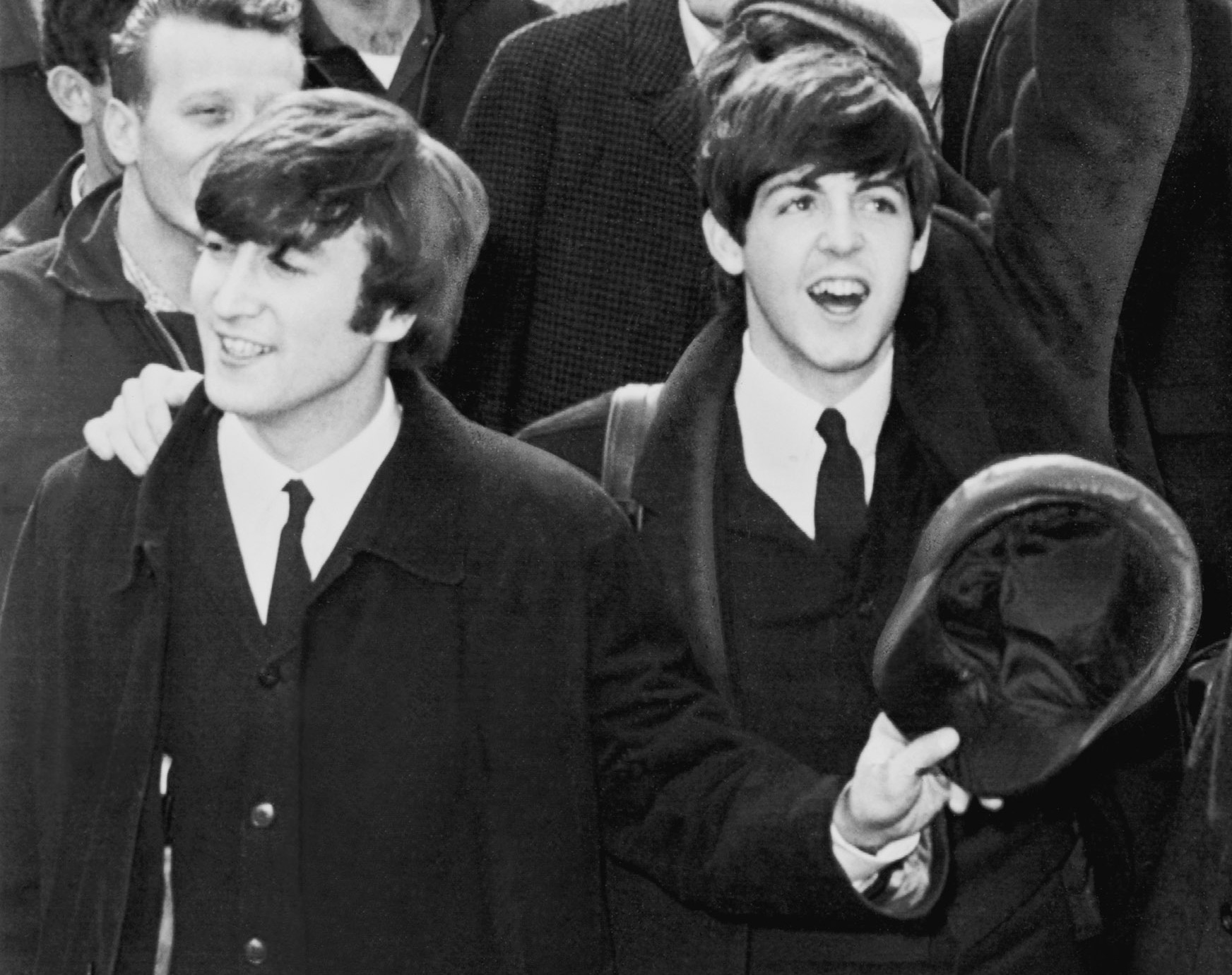
Guillemots recorded a version of Lennon and McCartney's "Tomorrow Never Knows" for the BBC's coverage of Glastonbury Festival 2011.

Since forming in 2004, Guillemots have recorded songs that have not been included on their official releases. At the end of 2005, the band uploaded a demo of their song "Cold Cool Moon" to their official website for fans to download for free. They also uploaded three improvised songs that had been recorded during jam sessions. During a series of live shows in 2006, the group featured in their set lists the Christmas carol "In the Bleak Midwinter" and original songs that had not formed part of Through the Windowpane. One such track, "21st May", was described by The Times as "gleefully [marrying] a hip-shaking reggae beat to jazz sax". In 2011, Guillemots recorded a version of "Tomorrow Never Knows" by John Lennon and Paul McCartney for the BBC's coverage of Glastonbury Festival 2011.

Unreleased songs by Guillemots
Song	Writer(s)	Year	Ref.
"21st May"	Unknown	2006	
"Cold Cool Moon"	Fyfe Dangerfield	2005	
"Daftside (Skewed Logic Mix)"	Rican Caol	2005	
"Don't Be Shy"	Unknown	2006	
"The Evil Duck: An Elegy"	Guillemots	2005	
"Great Crescendos"	Fyfe Dangerfield	2006	
"In the Bleak Midwinter"	trad.	2006	
"Mr. Priest"	Unknown	2006	
"Over the Blue Mountains"	Unknown	2006	
"Sol de Abril"	Unknown	2006	
"Tomorrow Never Knows"	John Lennon; Paul McCartney	2011	
"A Wine Glass and a Wet Finger"	Unknown	2005	
