= Annie, Let's Not Wait =

- CD single 1 cover art

Single by Guillemots

from the album Through the Windowpane
- Released: 15 January 2007
- Recorded: 2006
- Genre: Indie rock
- Label: Polydor
- Songwriter: Fyfe Dangerfield
- Producers: Fyfe Dangerfield; Adam Noble

Guillemots singles chronology
"Trains to Brazil" (2006)	"Annie, Let's Not Wait" (2007)	"Get Over It" (2008)

"Annie, Let's Not Wait" is a song by the multinational band Guillemots. It was written by Guillemots lead singer Fyfe Dangerfield, and featured on the band's debut album Through the Windowpane. A rerecorded version was released as a single on 15 January 2007 in four formats: two CD singles, a 7-inch and a digital download. A music video for the single version was directed by the British filmmaker Corin Hardy of Mysterious Cat Ltd., and was inspired by the 1926 animated film The Adventures of Prince Achmed. Critical reaction to "Annie, Let's Not Wait" was positive: in a retrospective review in 2020, Vice listed the single as the 47th best indie song of the period.

== Recording ==
The original version of "Annie, Let's Not Wait", which featured on Guillemots' debut album Through the Windowpane, was recorded at AIR Studios in early 2006, produced by Dangerfield with Chris Shaw, and mixed by Adam Noble. For the single release, the song was rerecorded in the hope of getting more exposure through radio airplay. The rerecorded version was produced by Dangerfield and Noble, was mixed by Cenzo Townshend, and featured new vocals from Toun Anibi, Beverly Tapiwa and Tanisha Spring, a trio named the Guillemettes. The Guillemettes had first appeared with the band during their appearance on Top of the Pops in June 2006, providing backing vocals for a performance of their single "Made-Up Love Song #43".

Speaking with the journalist Andy Welch in 2008, Dangerfield expressed regret at rerecording the track, saying: "We didn't do it under duress, but we regret doing that now. It worked, though, because that song's the most played thing we've ever had."

== Promotion and release ==
"Annie, Let's Not Wait" was released as a single on 15 January 2007 in four formats: two CD singles, a 7-inch and a digital download. The first CD single featured a strings only version of Guillemots' previous single "We're Here" as a B-side, while the second's B-sides included a cover of "Take Me Out" by the Scottish band Franz Ferdinand. The B-side on the 7-inch was a new track named "In Your Arms", written by Guillemots members MC Lord Magrão and Aristazabal Hawkes and featuring the rapper Freakshow. Promotion for the single's release included a performance by the band on Friday Night with Jonathan Ross on 8 December 2006.

== Critical reception ==
Critical reaction to "Annie, Let's Not Wait" was positive. Shilpa Ganatra of Hot Press praised the rerecorded version and called it "a fantastic choice of single". Yahoo! Music UK reviewed "Annie, Let's Not Wait" by saying that there was "a great band in [the single] waiting to get out". In a 2020 retrospective of British indie rock music in the late 2000s, Lauren O'Neill of Vice named "Annie, Let's Not Wait" as the 47th best song of the period, and described it as "a pretty, poppy love song backed by weirdo synths".

== Music video ==
The music video for "Annie, Let's Not Wait" was directed by the British filmmaker Corin Hardy of Mysterious Cat Ltd. Hardy had previously directed music videos for bands such as Keane, Dogs Die in Hot Cars and McFly. The video was inspired by the 1926 film The Adventures of Prince Achmed by the German director Lotte Reiniger, which is the oldest surviving feature-length animated film.

== Charts ==
Chart (2007)	Peak position
UK Singles (OCC)	27
UK Singles Downloads (OCC)	47
UK Physical Singles (OCC)	15

== Formats and track listings ==
- CD single 1
1. "Annie, Let's Not Wait" (radio version) – 3:47
2. "We're Here" (strings only) – 4:01
- CD single 2
1. "Annie, Let's Not Wait" (single version) – 4:22
2. "Photograph" (demo) – 4:58
3. "Take Me Out" (Live Lounge) – 4:10
4. "Annie, Let's Not Wait" (video) – 4:06
- 7-inch vinyl
1. "Annie Let's Not Wait" (single version) – 4:22
2. "In Your Arms" – 3:50
- Digital download
1. "Annie, Let's Not Wait" (single version) – 4:31
2. "Photograph" (demo) – 5:04
3. "Annie, Let's Not Wait" – 5:04
4. "Annie, Let's Not Wait" (Acoustic Gideon Coe Hub session) – 4:38
