= We're Here (song) =

- CD single cover art

Single by Guillemots

from the album Through the Windowpane
- Released: 27 March 2006
- Recorded: 2006
- Studio: AIR
- Genre: Indie
- Length: 5:18
- Label: Polydor
- Songwriter(s): Fyfe Dangerfield
- Producer(s): Fyfe Dangerfield; Chris Shaw

Guillemots singles chronology
"Trains to Brazil" (2005)	"We're Here" (2006)	"Made-Up Lovesong #43" (2006)

"We're Here" is a single by the multinational band Guillemots. It was written by Guillemots lead singer Fyfe Dangerfield, and recorded at AIR Studios in London. The completed song was released on 27 March 2006 in three formats—CD single, 7-inch and 10-inch—and received a positive reception from music critics. Reviews from God Is in the TV and Drowned in Sound awarded the track scores of four out of five and seven out of ten respectively.

== Composition and production ==
"We're Here" was written by Guillemots lead singer Fyfe Dangerfield in Cheltenham in June 2000. His influences for the song included Buffalo Springfield. It was recorded at AIR Studios in London, and features backing vocals from the English singer-songwriter Mara Carlyle. The song was produced by Dangerfield alongside Chris Shaw, who also mixed the track.

== Release ==
"We're Here" was released on 27 March 2006 in three formats: CD single, 7-inch and 10-inch. The CD single contained two B-sides ("Burnt", written by Dangerfield, and "I've Got a Problem (And the Problem Is You)/Turn the Candles On" written by Guillemots) and the music video for "We're Here". The 7-inch was a picture disc that contained the B-side "Monotonia", written by Guillemots member MC Lord Magrão. The 10-inch included the B-side "Falling Over My Feet", written by Guillemots.

A new version of "We're Here" featuring only the strings section of the song was included as a B-side on the CD single of Guillemots' 2007 release "Annie, Let's Not Wait". The track was released as a single on 15 January 2007, and peaked at number 27 on the UK Singles Chart.

== Critical reception ==
Critical reaction to "We're Here" was positive. Marcus Warner of God Is in the TV awarded the song a score of four out of five, describing it as an "elegant and frankly beautiful soundscape". Julian Ridgway of Drowned in Sound gave "We're Here" seven out of ten, and called it "special, majestic even". Yahoo! Music UK contrasted the song with the Wall of Sound production of Phil Spector and the British rock band Keane, while, in a review of Through the Windowpane, Marc Hogan of Pitchfork described the track as a "giddy new-love joy". In a review of a live performance by Guillemots, David Pollock of The Times compared "We're Here" with another of Dangerfield's compositions, "Little Bear", noting that "We're Here" was the "livelier" of the two.

== Music video ==
The music video for "We're Here" was directed by Chris Cairns, and is based on an original idea by Dangerfield. The video is a series of sped-up shots of the Scottish Highlands. It includes shots of lochs, roads, icicles, deer, clouds, swans, sheep, and waves crashing on the beach. The video uses an edited version of "We're Here" that runs to 4 minutes and 21 seconds, almost a minute shorter than the full-length version.

== In popular culture ==
"We're Here" was played in the background of episodes of the British soap operas Coronation Street and EastEnders – it was used at the turn of midnight on the 2006 New Year's Eve episode of the latter. The song was also used by the British TV channel Sky Sports during their coverage of the 2007–08 and 2008–09 UEFA Champions Leagues.

== Formats and track listings ==
- CD single
1. "We're Here" – 5:18
2. "Burnt" – 3:22
3. "I've Got a Problem (And the Problem Is You)/Turn the Candles On" – 8:24
4. "We're Here" (video) – 4:21
- 7-inch vinyl
1. "We're Here" – 5:18
2. "Monotonia" – 3:46
- 10-inch vinyl
1. "We're Here" – 5:18
2. "Falling Over My Feet" – 5:44
