= Get Over It (Guillemots song) =

Single by Guillemots

from the album Red
- Released: 17 March 2008
- Recorded: 2007
- Genre: Indie rock
- Label: Polydor Records
- Songwriters: Fyfe Dangerfield, Aristazabal Hawkes, Greig Stewart, MC Lord Magrão

Guillemots singles chronology
"Annie, Let's Not Wait" (2007)	"Get Over It" (2008)	"Falling out of Reach" (2008)

"Get Over It" is a song by Guillemots, which appears on the band's second album, Red. It was released as the first single from their second album on 17 March 2008.

The music has a disco-influenced pop sound.

The song was championed by BBC Radio 1 presenter Scott Mills and featured on the station's playlist. The debut chart position for the single was #20 on the official UK singles chart for the week ending 23 March 2008.

The video was filmed in 2008, and was directed by Guillemots member MC Lord Magrão.

== Tracks ==
CD

1. "Get Over It" (album version)
2. "Throw Me a Sun"
3. "Me Diz"

7" #1

1. "Get Over It" (album version)
2. "What We Have"

7" #2

1. "Get Over It" (album version)
2. "This Is the Last Ride Tonight"

iTunes single

1. "Get Over It" (radio edit)

iTunes EP 1

1. "Get Over It" (album version)
2. "Me Diz"
3. "This Is the Last Ride Tonight"

iTunes EP 2

1. "Get Over It" (album version)
2. "Throw Me A Sun"
3. "What We Have"
