= Walk the River =

Studio album by Guillemots
- Released: 18 April 2011
- Genre: Indie rock
- Length: 65:13
- Labels: Polydor, 987 782-4
- Producer: David Kosten

Guillemots chronology
Red (2008)	Walk the River (2011)	Hello Land! (2012)

Professional ratings
Review scores
Source	Rating
BBC Collective	Negative link
Holy Moly	9/10 link
NME	5/10 link
Pitchfork	5.9/10.0 link
Q	4/5 stars

Walk the River is the third full-length album from the British indie rock band Guillemots. It was released on 18 April 2011 in the United Kingdom and reached number 26 on the UK Albums Chart. The album has been preceded by the releases of two tracks: first single off the album "The Basket", and a free download of the album's title track via the band's official website.

== Track listing ==
No.	Title	Writer(s)	Length
1.	"Walk the River"	Guillemots	5:08
2.	"Vermillion"	Fyfe Dangerfield	5:21
3.	"I Don't Feel Amazing Now"	Dangerfield, Guillemots	5:27
4.	"Ice Room"	Guillemots	3:46
5.	"Tigers"	Guillemots	4:02
6.	"Inside"	Guillemots	5:17
7.	"I Must Be a Lover"	Dangerfield, Aristazabal Hawkes	3:53
8.	"Slow Train"	Dangerfield, Guillemots	4:41
9.	"Sometimes I Remember Wrong"	Dangerfield, Guillemots	9:16
10.	"The Basket"	Guillemots	4:43
11.	"Dancing in the Devil's Shoes"	Dangerfield	5:04
12.	"Yesterday Is Dead"	Dangerfield	8:35
Total length:			65:13

US bonus track
No.	Title	Length
13.	"Nothing You Feel Is True"	5:38

== Critical response ==
The album has received widely positive reviews in the media. Q gave it 4 stars, stating that it's "restlessly inventive and soaring melodic". Mojo also gave it 4 stars, commending it on its depth in songwriting. The Fly were taken by surprise by the album's approach to Shoegaze and how Fyfe Dangerfield has moved on in songwriting since his success with his solo album Fly Yellow Moon, giving it 7 out of 10.
