= Technology business incubator =

Business focused on technology organizations

A technology business incubator (or TBI) is a type of business incubator focused on organizations that help startup companies and individual entrepreneurs which use modern technologies as the primary means of innovation to develop their businesses by providing a range of services, including training, brokering and financing. In several countries, including India, China, and the Philippines, there have been government initiatives to support TBIs. Organizations designated as of technology business incubator often receive funding or other forms of support from the national government.

== Technology business incubators examples by region ==
=== India ===
1. AMITY INNOVATION INCUBATOR
2. CIIE.CO
3. i-Hub

=== Britain ===
1. Seed Camp
2. Entrepreneur First
3. Founders Institute

=== USA ===
1. Y Combinator
2. TechStars
3. 500 Startups

== See also ==
- Technium
- Technology Hub
- Technology transfer
