= Stay Hungry (disambiguation) =

Stay Hungry is a film directed by Bob Rafelson, adapted from a novel of the same title by Charles Gaines.

Stay Hungry may also refer to:

- Stay Hungry (album), an album by Twisted Sister, or its title track
- "Stay Hungry", a song by Talking Heads, named after the film directed by Bob Rafelson, from More Songs About Buildings and Food

== See also ==
- Still Hungry (disambiguation)
- Stay Hungry Stay Foolish
