= Shoaib Ahmed =

Shoaib Ahmed may refer to:

- Shoaib Ahmed (businessman) (1964–2026), Indian software evangelist
- Shoaib Ahmed (Indian cricketer) (born 1987), Indian cricketer
- Shoaib Ahmed (Pakistani cricketer) (born 1990), Pakistani cricketer
