= Shingai Shoniwa =

British musical artist (born 1981)

Shingai
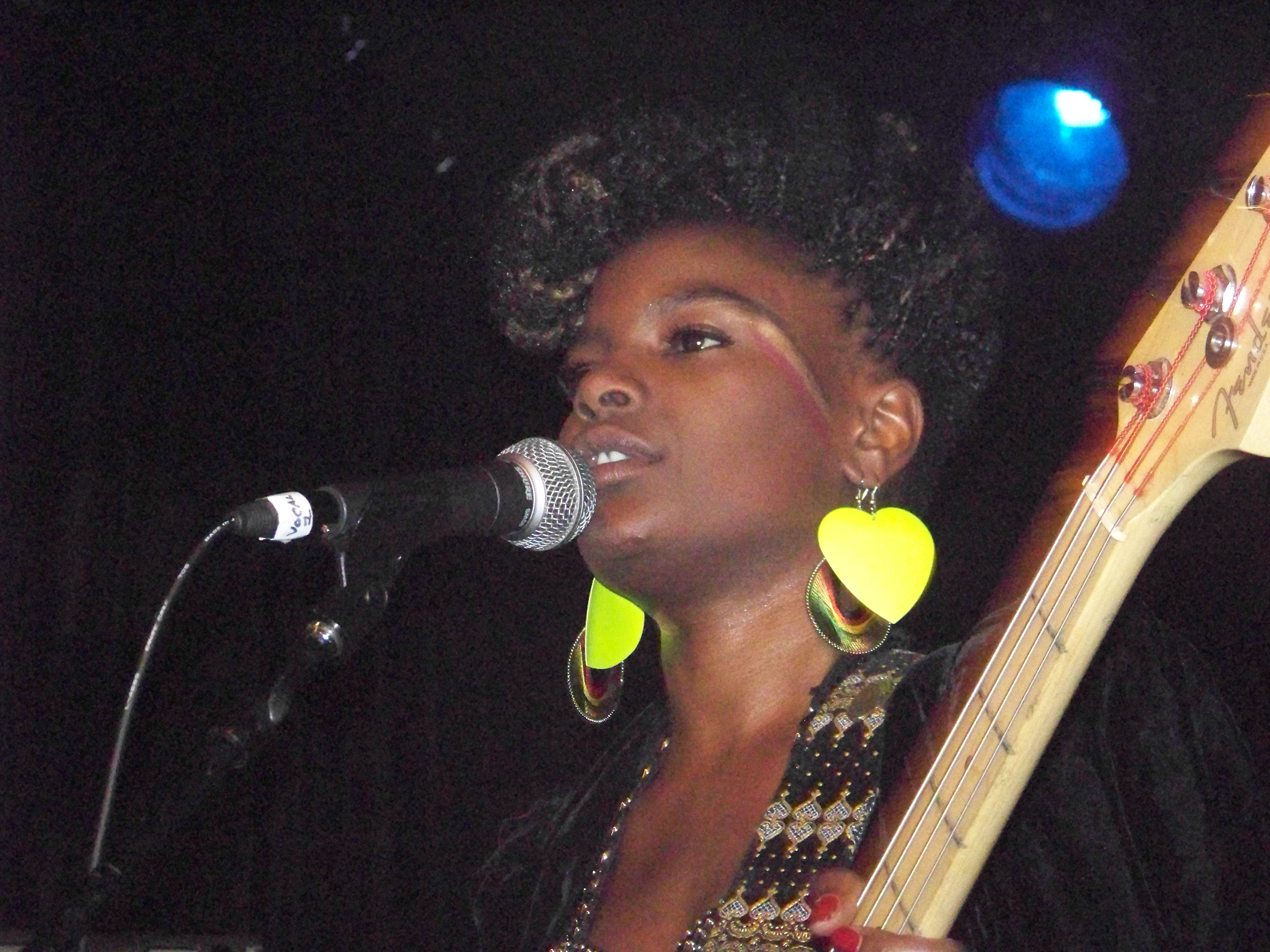
- Shoniwa performing in Atlanta, 2007

Background information
- Born: Shingai Elizabeth Maria Shoniwa; 1 September 1981 (age 44); Lewisham, London, England
- Genres: Pop; afrobeat; post-punk revival; indie rock; soul; blues; electronic
- Occupations: Singer; musician; songwriter; actress
- Instruments: Vocals; bass; guitar
- Years active: 2006–present
- Labels: Zimtron; Universal; Motown; Vertigo
- Member of: Noisettes
- Website: www.shing.ai

Shingai Elizabeth Maria Shoniwa (/ʃɪŋˈɡaɪ/ shing-GHY; born 1 September 1981), known professionally as Shingai, is a British singer, songwriter, musician, and actress, best known as the vocalist and bassist for the English indie rock band Noisettes. In 2017, she launched her solo career and released her debut solo album in 2020.

== Early life ==
Shingai was born and grew up in Lewisham, South East London. Her parents are both Zimbabweans who migrated to England. That experience, Shoniwa says, informs her music. "Wanting to escape from reality can inspire the greatest and most trivial creative natures in people," and "I think escapism is something that connects all of us. Everybody has their own little soundtrack, and I guess I'm trying to make my own soundtrack to my escape plan. I want people to realise that there's so much more." Her first name, Shingai, means "be bold/courageous/strong" in the Shona language.

She first wanted to be an actress, and for a while joined the Lost Vagueness crew as a burlesque performer. She studied circus skills at a London youth club as a teenager. When she graduated, she attended art school and dabbled in local theatre. Her classmate and friend, Dan Smith, would hold what she called "ridiculous jam sessions — too many people strumming broken guitars thinking they're Syd Barrett". She then went on to study at the BRIT School for Performing Arts & Technology in Croydon. One day she joined him singing, and the two quickly formed a group called the Noisettes. Their first release in 2002 was on a compilation called "Raison D'Etre London Vol 1" Compiled by Yvan Serrano (Dustaphonics) regrouping some of London's up and coming artists, also featuring Charlie Winston among others.

== Music career ==
Critical response to Shingai's performance has largely been positive. Rolling Stone magazine said that "Shingai is a living, breathing manifestation of the rock & roll spirit, with a voice that is equal parts Iggy Pop and Billie Holiday." In her stage persona, Shingai looks like what the New Yorker called "an African supermodel", and she frequently performs in bare feet while wearing face paint or fur hats on stage.

Shingai has provided backing vocals for different indie rock, electronic, and punk rock artists including, Guillemots with their song "Made Up Love Song#43" and "Over the Stairs". Shingai made an appearance on Annie Lennox's 2007 album, Songs Of Mass Destruction on the single "Sing". The track, about the fight against HIV and AIDS, included 22 other renowned female artists such as Madonna, Melissa Etheridge, Gladys Knight, and Celine Dion.

Shingai, along with Patti Smith and Juliette Lewis, helped celebrate Jack Daniel's birthday in Lynchburg, Tennessee, on 13 October 2007. The three were joined by The New Silver Cornet Band for the show, which took place at the company's distillery. The event was part of the 157th birthday celebrations for Jack Daniel, who was born in September 1850. The Birthday JD Set opened to specially invited guests and competition winners only.

On 19 November 2009, Shingai performed with rapper Dizzee Rascal at the Royal Albert Hall for an event to raise money for charity. Additional collaboration of Shingai with Rascal related to a version of the latter's song "Holiday".

Shingai is credited for vocals of Dennis Ferrer's "Hey Hey" dance/house track, released in late November 2009.

On 31 December 2009 Shingai was featured in the Annual Hootenanny 2010 show (aired by BBC), where she performed together with Jools Holland a version of "Don't Upset the Rhythm" and contributed to the vocals of tail-song "Down By The Riverside".

In 2013, Shingai appeared on the album Chrome Black Gold by Chrome Hoof, singing lead on four tracks. She also made appearances live with the band.

She released her first solo album, Too Bold, in October 2020.

On June 25, 2021 Mark Knight from Toolroom Records released his first album of original music entitled Untold Business with a track titled "Feel The Pressure" featuring Shingai on vocals. Later that summer she served as curator for the Southbank Centre's Summer Reunion shows.

== Acting career ==
Shingai provided the voice of the character Teal on the CBeebies show The Adventures of Abney & Teal that ran for two seasons between 2011 and 2012.

In 2017 she made a cameo appearance in Cook Off, a romantic comedy and Zimbabwe's first film to be streamed on Netflix.

In 2018 she starred in Joseph A. Adesunloye's multi-narrative drama, Faces alongside Terry Pheto.

In 2024 she starred in the British short Osoro by Sheila Nortley, a supernatural romance taking place in the noughties Black Britain. In 2025 it was announced that the short was being developed into a feature film with Shingai a returning member of the cast.

== Philanthropy and advocacy ==
As part of Amnesty International's Make Some Noise campaign to raise awareness of the conflict in Darfur, appeared in the 2007 Instant Karma! video singing John Lennon's song "Imagine" .

In 2016, she appeared in the "I've Got #Refugenes" campaign.

== Solo discography ==
=== Studio albums ===
- Too Bold (2020)

=== Extended plays ===
- Ancient Futures (2019)

=== Singles ===
- "Coming Home" (2019)
- "Zimtron" (2019)
- "Champion Styles" (2019)
- "Love and Affection" (2019)
- "War Drums" (2020)
- "Echoes of You" (2020)
- "We Roll" (2020)
- "In This World" feat. DJ Lara Fraser (2021)
- "Too Bold Remix" (2021)
- "Echoes of You (Kenyan Remix)" (2021)
- "War Drums (ZIM Remix)" (2021)
- "No Fear (Birth Right)" (2021)

== Noisettes discography ==
Studio albums

- What's the Time, Mr Wolf? (2007)
- Wild Young Hearts (2009)
- Contact (2012)

== Collaborations ==
- Herbert songs: "I Miss You", "The Audience", "It's Only", "A Reprise", "Leave Me Now", "Misprints", "Chromoshop" (2000–2003)
- Ace songs: "No Fear Of Falling" and "Phoenix" from the album Still Hungry (2003)
- Toob songs: "Inky" and "Beaulieu" from the album How To Spell Toob (2005)
- Guillemots songs: "Made-Up Lovesong 43" from their album, Through the Windowpane (2006) and "Over the Stairs" from their From the Cliffs EP (2006)
- Annie Lennox single: "Sing" from the album Songs of Mass Destruction (2008)
- Plugs singles: "That Number", "Imaginary Friends" (2008)
- Dennis Ferrer: "Hey Hey" (2010)
- Winky D "Dzimba Dzemabwe" (2022)

== Equipment ==
- Bass guitar: Fender
- Amp: Ashdown
