= Through the Windowpane =

Studio album by Guillemots
- Released: 10 July 2006
- Genres: Art pop, chamber pop, indie pop
- Length: 60:01
- Labels: Polydor, 987 782-4
- Producers: Fyfe Dangerfield, Chris Shaw, Nick Ingman, Brian Mills, Joum "Turbo" Lucas

Guillemots chronology
From the Cliffs (2006)	Through the Windowpane (2006)	Red (2008)

Professional ratings
Aggregate scores
Source	Rating
Metacritic	81/100
Review scores
Source	Rating
AllMusic	3/5 stars
The Guardian	3/5 stars
Mojo	4/5 stars
The New Zealand Herald	4/5 stars
NME	8/10
The Observer	4/5 stars
Pitchfork	8.3/10
Q	4/5 stars
The Sunday Times	5/5 stars
Uncut	4/5 stars

Through the Windowpane is the debut full-length album from the British indie rock band Guillemots. It was released on 10 July 2006 in the United Kingdom and reached number 17 in the UK Album Chart. The album was highly anticipated following the strength of the singles "Trains to Brazil" and "Made-Up Lovesong #43". It was nominated for the 2006 Mercury Music Prize. The band released the final single from the album, a re-recording of "Annie, Let's Not Wait", on 15 January 2007.

== Track listing ==
All tracks are written by Fyfe Dangerfield except where noted.

No.	Title	Writer(s)	Length
1.	"Little Bear"		4:49
2.	"Made-Up Lovesong #43"		3:41
3.	"Trains to Brazil"		4:02
4.	"Redwings"		6:02
5.	"Come Away with Me"	Guillemots	3:10
6.	"Through the Windowpane"		3:39
7.	"If the World Ends"		6:20
8.	"We're Here"		5:14
9.	"Blue Would Still Be Blue"		5:14
10.	"Annie, Let's Not Wait"		4:44
11.	"And If All…"	Guillemots	1:19
12.	"São Paulo"	Guillemots	11:42

== Production ==
This album was produced by Fyfe Dangerfield with Chris Shaw ("Redwings", "Come Away With Me", "Through the Windowpane", "If the World Ends", "We're Here", "Annie Let's Not Wait" and "São Paulo"), Nick Ingman ("Little Bear"), Bryan Mills (old tracks on "Made-Up Lovesong #43") and Joum "Turbo" Lucas ("Blue Would Still Be Blue"). "Made-up Lovesong #43" is an alternative cut to the one featured on I Saw Such Things in My Sleep and From the Cliffs.

== Song information ==
The following is a list of musicians (excluding the four band members) who feature on the album (taken from the album booklet):

"Little Bear"

1. An orchestra of strings

"Made-Up Lovesong #43"

1. Shingai Shoniwa ("care"s + voice clicking)
2. Bryan Mills (tambourine + memoryman)

"Trains to Brazil"

1. Christopher Cundy (soprano sax + bass clarinet)
2. Alex J Ward (alto sax)
3. John Martin (tenor sax)
4. Gavin Broom (trumpet)
5. Mr Trombone (trombone)
6. Ed Millett (breaths)

"Redwings"

1. Joan Wasser (singing and violin)
2. The Aveley & Newham Brass Band (self-explanatory)

"Come Away With Me"

1. Fulvio Sigurta (trumpet)

"Through the Windowpane"

1. Fulvio Sigurta (trumpet)
2. Adam Noble (the randomises)

"If the World Ends"

1. Mara Carlyle ("ooh"s + a sung line)
2. Another orchestra of strings

"We're Here"

1. El Matthews B.P.S.C (spoken intro) ("Mas o mundo não acabou. Ainda. De qualquer forma." – "But the world has not ended. Yet. Anyway.")
2. Mara Carlyle ("ooh"s + saw)
3. Yet more strings

"Blue Would Still Be Blue"

1. Absolutely no-one but a bottle of wine

"Annie, Let's Not Wait"

1. The insatiable charity shop samba band (percussion)
2. The children of mots school, guilleford ("annie annie"s)

"And If All..."

1. Mabel the ghost (guidance)

"São Paulo"

1. Fulvio Sigurta (flugelhorn)
2. Mara Carlyle (singing at the beginning)
3. Steve Noble (rain rolls on the snare)
4. Alex J Ward (alto sax)
5. Christopher Cundy (soprano sax)
6. A very big orchestra of string, wind, brass and percussion

Orchestra players were contracted by Isobel Griffiths. Orchestra leader – Gavyn Wright. Orchestra conducted by Nick Ingman.

Although the back album cover names track 5 as "Come Away With Me", the track is incorrectly tagged as "A Samba in the Snowy Rain" by iTunes.

== Certifications ==
Region	Certification	Certified units/sales
United Kingdom (BPI)	Gold	147,050
