= Still Hungry =

Still Hungry may refer to:

- Still Hungry (Twisted Sister album), a re-recording of the Twisted Sister album Stay Hungry
- Still Hungry (Ace album)
- Still Hungry (John Pinette album), a comedy performance released on CD and DVD by John Pinette
- 'Still Hungry', the hidden track eight minutes in the song Can't Stop This on Sam Sparro's debut album, Sam Sparro

== See also ==
- Stay Hungry (disambiguation)
