= Hello Land! =

Studio album by Guillemots
- Released: 7 May 2012
- Genre: Baroque pop; indie; pop
- Length: 44:55
- Label: The state51 Conspiracy; CON150
- Producer: Jonas Raabe

Guillemots chronology
Walk the River (2011)	Hello Land! (2012)

Professional ratings
Review scores
Source	Rating
"BBC"	Positive link
"The Independent"	link
music OMH	link

Hello Land! is the fourth and final album by multinational music group Guillemots. On 7 May 2012, the band announced their intention to release four albums during the year, each representing a different season – the first, Hello Land!, was released through The state51 Conspiracy, and represents spring. The album was primarily recorded in Norway.

== Track listing ==
No.	Title	Writer(s)	Length
1.	"Spring Bells"	MC Lord Magrão, Fyfe Dangerfield	1:52
2.	"Up on the Ride"	Guillemots, Jonas Raabe	6:48
3.	"Fleet"	Guillemots, Jonas Raabe	4:43
4.	"Southern Winds"	Fyfe Dangerfield	5:06
5.	"Outside"	Guillemots	6:54
6.	"Nothing's Going to Bring Me Down"	Guillemots	4:20
7.	"Byebyeland"	Guillemots, Jonas Raabe	9:06
8.	"I Lie Down"	Guillemots, Jonas Raabe	6:06
Total length:			44:55
