= Kriss Kross / Clarion =

"Kriss Kross" / "Clarion"

Single by Guillemots

from the album Red
- Released: Digital download: 22 September 2008; 10": 6 October 2008
- Recorded: 2008
- Genre: Indie
- Length: "Kriss Kross": 4:24 "Clarion": 4:04
- Songwriters: Kriss Kross: Fyfe Dangerfield, Aristazabal Hawkes, Greig Stewart, MC Lord Magrão; Clarion: Fyfe Dangerfield

Guillemots singles chronology
"Falling Out of Reach" (2008)	"Kriss Kross" / "Clarion" (2008)	"The Basket" (2011)

"Kriss Kross" / "Clarion" is a double A-side single by multinational band Guillemots. It was released on 28 September 2008 as a digital download, then as a limited edition 10" record two weeks later. It was the first double A-side released by Guillemots. Lead singer Fyfe Dangerfield explained: "We've always meant to put out a double A-side at some point, and we couldn't decide which of 'Kriss Kross' and 'Clarion' should be the next single, so now seemed like the right time to do both." Dangerfield was the sole writer of "Clarion"; "Kriss Kross" was credited to the entire band. Both songs were produced by Guillemots and record producer Adam Noble, and both were featured on Guillemots' second album, Red.

"Kriss Kross" had already been made available to download for free from Guillemots' official website during February 2008. When officially rereleased as a download through the iTunes Store, the song was featured with "Clarion" as part of a digital EP, alongside a new song written at Latitude Festival 2008 entitled "Fishbone for a Drink", a live cover of "Black and Gold" by Sam Sparro, and the music video for "Kriss Kross". The video was filmed in 2008, and was directed by Guillemots member MC Lord Magrão, who uploaded it to his personal YouTube account during August 2008.

Critical reception to "Kriss Kross" / "Clarion" was generally positive. After it was made available for free to download, "Kriss Kross" was described as "cool" by Sugar; Stereogum praised its melody and Dangerfield's "trademark exubarence", but stated that its outro was "mundane". Andy Gill of The Independent described the song as having a "lumbering funk-rock groove", while Nick Orton of Gigwise called it "aggressive", and "revealing a harder Guillemots than we’re accustomed to". A more critical review came from Yahoo! Music UK, who gave "Kriss Kross" a score of six out of ten, unfavourably comparing it with both British glam rock band The Darkness and "Kiss Kiss" by Australian singer Holly Valance.

== Formats and track listings ==
- Digital download
1. "Kriss Kross" (Radio Edit) – 4:00
2. "Black & Gold" (Live in Jo Whiley's Live Lounge) – 4:30
3. "Clarion" (Radio Edit) – 3:16
4. "Fishbone for a Drink" – 7:55
5. "Kriss Kross" (music video) – 4:32
- 10" vinyl
1. "Kriss Kross" – 4:24
2. "Black and Gold" (Live Lounge) – 4:30
3. "Clarion" – 4:04
4. "Fishbone for a Drink" – 7:55
