= Falling Out of Reach =

"Falling out of Reach"

Single by Guillemots

from the album Red
- Released: 26 May 2008
- Recorded: 2007
- Genre: Indie rock
- Label: Polydor Records
- Songwriters: Fyfe Dangerfield, Aristazabal Hawkes, Greig Stewart, MC Lord Magrão

Guillemots singles chronology
"Get over It" (2008)	"Falling out of Reach" (2008)	"Kriss Kross / Clarion" (2008)

"Falling out of Reach" is a song by Guillemots that appears on the band's second album, Red. It was released as the second single from their second album on 26 May 2008. It has reached #49 on the UK Singles Chart. The B-side, 'Trick Of The Light' was originally recorded for Q (magazine). The band were given the song title 'Seabirds' and 24 hours to write and record the track.

The video for the single features actor Ian McKellen. The band performed the song at Wulfrun Hall in Wolverhampton.

== Reception ==
Review of the single were generally positive. Digital Spy gave the single four stars out of five, calling it "an epic, gorgeous summer tear-jerker". Amrit Singh of Stereogum described it as a "really lovely song". Clash Music called it a "grandiose affair", and praised its "thoughtful lyrics". A slightly more critical review came from Nick Orton of Gigwise, who called the song "80s radio-friendly MOR".

== Tracks ==
=== CD ===
1. "Falling out of Reach" (Radio Mix)
2. "Falling out of Reach" (Album Version)
3. "Trick of the Light"

=== 7" 1 ===
1. "Falling out of Reach" (Radio Mix)
2. "Last Kiss" (Instrumental)

=== 7" 2 ===
1. "Falling out of Reach" (Radio Mix)
2. "The Face We Deserve"

== Chart performance ==
Chart (2008)	Peak position
UK Singles (OCC)	49
