= Shoaib Ahmed (businessman) =

Indian software businessman and evangelist (1964–2026)

- Born: 3 May 1964; Bangalore, Karnataka, India
- Died: 28 June 2026 (aged 62); Bengaluru, Karnataka, India
- Education: IIM Calcutta; St. Joseph's College, Bangalore
- Title: President, Tally Solutions
- Spouse: Nilofer Ahmed
- Children: 2
- Awards: The Economic Times Now – Retail Leadership Award (2013)

Shoaib Ahmed (3 May 1964 – 28 June 2026) was an Indian software businessman, evangelist, author and TED speaker. He served as president of Tally Solutions, the leading Indian financial ERP system with over 1 million clients and a worldwide presence in 100 countries. He was nominated by his peers in the Indian retail industry for The Economic Times 'Retail Leadership Award' and was a member of the regional council of NASSCOM, and a founding member of iSPIRT, the Indian Software Products Industry Round Table, think tank for the Indian software products industry.

Ahmed later incubated Catalystor – an enterprise with the intent to make technology effective for businesses – which he continued to lead until his passing.

== Early life and education ==
Ahmed, born in Bangalore in the State of Karnataka, was the son of the late Honourable Justice S.M. Sait of the Karnataka High Court. Shoaib completed his undergraduate degree at St. Joseph's College, Bangalore, and his postgraduate studies at the Indian Institute of Management Calcutta.

== Software evangelism ==
Ahmed, in addition to his role as President of Tally, was actively involved in mentoring software products and entrepreneurs in India. As a Fellow at iSPIRT, he led the Software Adoption Initiative (SAI). He actively mentored startups both as a member of the Indian Angel Network and through CIIE – Centre for Innovation, Incubation & Entrepreneurship at Indian Institute of Management Ahmedabad. He served on the advisory committee of Glocal University and was a member of the regional council of NASSCOM.

== Business career and awards ==
Ahmed started as a businessman by co-founding Vedha Automations, which developed a Point of Sale (POS) retail product – Shoper – the first of its kind in India to introduce barcoding to the retail space. The company was acquired by Tally Solutions in 2005, and Shoper was integrated into Tally's platform to offer a complete enterprise retail software suite. Ahmed received The Economic Times Now 'Retail Leadership Award' in February 2013, nominated by his peers in the Indian Retail Industry.

== Death ==
Shoaib Ahmed died in Bengaluru, Karnataka on 28 June 2026, at the age of 62. He was survived by his wife, Nilofer Ahmed, and their two children.
