= CIIE.CO =

Indian startup accelerator

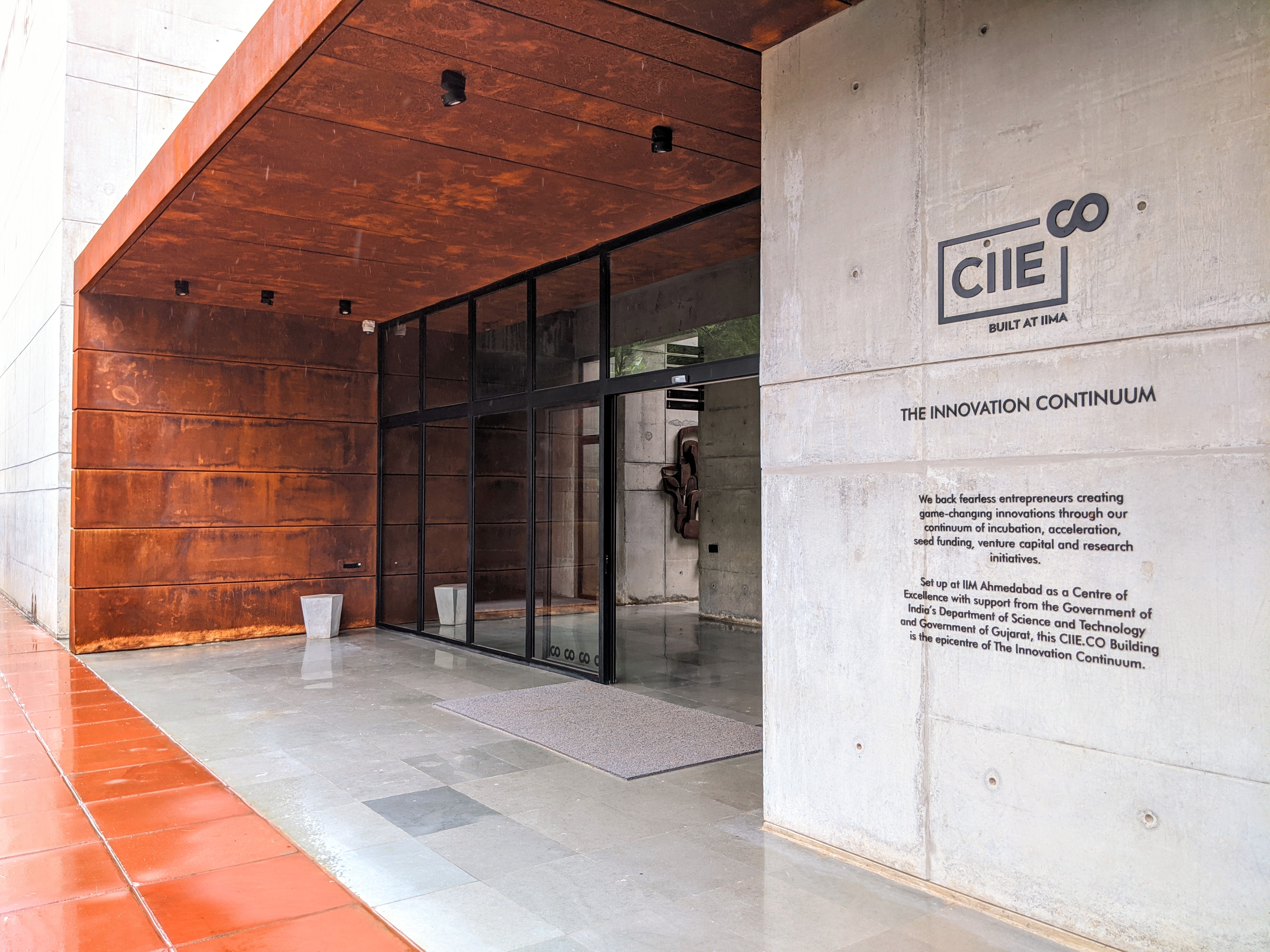
- CIIE headquarters at IIM Ahmedabad
- Formerly: CIIE
- Company type: Venture capital
- Industry: Startup accelerator, Startup incubator
- Founded: 2002; 24 years ago in Ahmedabad, India
- Headquarters: IIM Ahmedabad, Gujarat, India
- Number of locations: 5 (Ahmedabad, Jaipur, Indore, Bengaluru, Guwahati)
- Key people: Kunal Upadhyay (CEO)
- Services: Venture capital, Investment
- Website: ciie.co

CIIE.CO is an Indian startup accelerator and incubator that supports early-stage startups located at IIM Ahmedabad in Ahmedabad, India. It was founded in 2002 to promote innovation and entrepreneurship in India. It is a Center of excellence set up at Indian Institute of Management Ahmedabad with support from the Government of India's Department of Science and Technology and the Government of Gujarat.

It provides investments, incubation, acceleration, infrastructure, training and access to a network of collaborators. As of August 2022, it has accelerated nearly 1000 startups, funded 300 and mentored and coached over 5000 startups across its various programs such as iAccelerator, Power of Ideas, Powerstart, India Innovation Growth Program, Start up Oasis, Bharat Inclusion Initiative. CIIE.CO provides funding in the form of government grants, pre-seed, seed and series, an investment starting from around ₹10 lakh to ₹15 lakh of grand capital up to US$5 million. It has similar incubation centres in Jaipur, Rajasthan and one facility in Indore, Madhya Pradesh.

== History ==
The CIIE previously stood for Centre for Innovation, Incubation and Entrepreneurship. It was originally set up in 2002 as a research institution with a grant pool from the Government of Gujarat, the Department of Science and Technology (India) and IIM Ahmedabad. In 2007, it became an incubation centre after its incorporation under Section 25 of the Companies Act, 1956. In 2008, a non-profit organization, CIIE Initiatives, was registered to help the emerging startup ecosystem in India. It continues to operate as an academic centre at IIM-A. It was rebranded as CIIE.CO in 2018, with the 'CO' denoting the continuum.

In 2009, CIIE started an accelerator program, iAccelerator, which focused on startups in information and communication technology. In July 2010, CIIE tied up with The Economic Times and the Department of Science and Technology, Government of India and launched 'Power of Ideas', a platform for aspiring and budding entrepreneurs.

In 2011, it launched INFUSE (Indian Fund for Sustainable Energy), a cleantech and sustainability focused fund in collaboration with the Union Ministry of New and Renewable Energy (MNRE), BP Plc and Technology Development Board (TDB). A ₹A 100-crore budget was allocated for the INFUSE Ventures. The MNRE provided monetary support and guided the startups through policies and regulations. For institutional support, CIIE teamed up with the Asian Development Bank and the International Financial Corporation, both are part of the World Bank Group.

In 2013, the Centre for Innovation, Incubation and Entrepreneurship formed an incubator, Startup Oasis, in partnership with the Rajasthan State Industrial Development and Investment Corporation (RIICO), Government of Rajasthan. Startup Oasis is based in Jaipur and has incubated 202 startups as of 2019.

In 2017, CIIE.CO launched Bharat Innovation Fund, a US $150-million fund announced in late 2015 by Prime Minister Narendra Modi during his visit to Silicon Valley. Bharat Innovation Fund is a public-private-academia partnership set up by the CIIE at IIM Ahmedabad in collaboration with the Ministry of New and Renewable Energy, Department of Industrial Policy and Promotion, Department of Science and Technology and Tata Trusts.

In December 2021, the Innocity Startup School, a 14-week non-residential programme, was started to help early-stage startups. In partnership with Bajaj Electricals, CIIE.CO launched a new incubation centre, Anant Bajaj Limitless Ideas Hub, in Jaipur in August 2021.

=== iAccelerator ===
In 2009, CIIE.CO launched iAccelerator, which was the first accelerator program in India for startups offering mentorships, market connections and access to capital. iAccelerator program provides three-month residential mentorship and guidance to the batch of selected startups. During the three-month stay, these startups get investment, infrastructure and business mentoring from experts, mentors, investors, and tech enthusiasts. At the end of the incubation program, these startups pitch their innovation to early-stage angels and venture capitalists on the demo day.

=== Bharat Inclusion Initiative ===
Bharat Innovation Fund is a public-private-academia partnership set up by the CIIE.CO in 2017 in collaboration with the Ministry of New and Renewable Energy, Department of Industrial Policy and Promotion and Department of Science and Technology. In August 2018, as a part of Bharat Inclusion Initiative, CIIE.CO and J.P. Morgan collaboratively set up a $9.5 million financial inclusion lab, under which J.P. Morgan announced to provide up to $7 million over the next four years, making it the largest philanthropic commitment made by the banking giant outside the US. The financial lab was started to incubate and support the startups and entrepreneurs working to help the lower and middle income (LMI) segment in financial inclusion, health and education.

It has received a pledge of US$12.5 million from the Bill & Melinda Gates Foundation, the Michael and Susan Dell Foundation, Omidyar Network and Tata Trusts.

== Projects ==
The organisation published Stay Hungry Stay Foolish, a non-fiction bestseller by author Rashmi Bansal, an alumnus of IIM-A. The book featured stories of 25 MBA IIM Ahmedabad graduates who left their jobs to pursue entrepreneurship. It has reached over a million readers.

In 2015, it conducted the 'Innovate for Digital India challenge' with Intel, the Department of Science and Technology and MyGov.in.

In May 2022, CIIE.CO came up with another book, Startup Compass: How Iconic Entrepreneurs Got It Right, published by HarperCollins, written by IIM-A alumni Ujwal Kalra and Shobhit Shubhankar. The book is based on the 'How to Start a Startup' series at IIM Ahmedabad and has comprehensive interviews by 15 Indian entrepreneurs, including Sanjeev Bikhchandani (Naukri.com), Deep Kalra (MakeMyTrip), Sachin Bansal (Flipkart), Falguni Nayar (Nykaa), Kunal Shah (CRED), Sahil Barua (Delhivery), Raghunandan G. (TaxiForSure). It has a foreword by Infosys founder N. R. Narayana Murthy.

== Portfolio ==
Some of the notable ventures backed by CIIE.CO, through its various initiatives and programs, includes Ridlr, CreditVidya, FireCompass, Detect Technologies, Recruiterbox, Chara Technologies, Forus Healthcare, MechMocha, SalesKen, Tookitaki, Zumutor Biologics and Razorpay. Razorpay, a payment gateway platform later turned into a unicorn startup, was incubated by CIIE.CO in Jaipur, at Startup Oasis.

From 2018 to 2021, CIIE.CO has conducted various craft-centric startup programs and supported more than 46 craft startups, out of which 17 startups received funding from the CIIE, including startups such as Khadigi, Kosha, Golden Feather, Fabriclore, Fabricmonde, P-Tal, Kalaghar, Dressfolk, Abira, Country Clay, Claybotik, Baansuli, Guddee. In July 2022, it announced to support over 100 early-age craft startups by the year 2025. The craft vertical at CIIE.CO offers over 15 craft companies with access to portfolio support through sprints, incubation and acceleration, seed funding and catalytic capital support of up to ₹50 lakh. In 2022, it also published a report on the crafts sector, outlining the startup opportunities in the sector.

== People ==
Kunal Upadhyay is the CEO of CIIE.CO and Managing Partner of Bharat Fund. 35 to 40 people work from the office at IIM-A, while the rest operate from different parts of the country.

== Research ==
The CIIE was set up as a research institution back in 2002. It has a team for research like management research, identifying trends and innovations, publications and thematic reports. In 2021, CIIE conducted a research study on the cultivated meat sector in India in partnership with The Good Food Institute, India.

== See also ==
- Indian Institute of Management Ahmedabad
