= Guillemots (band) =

British indie rock band

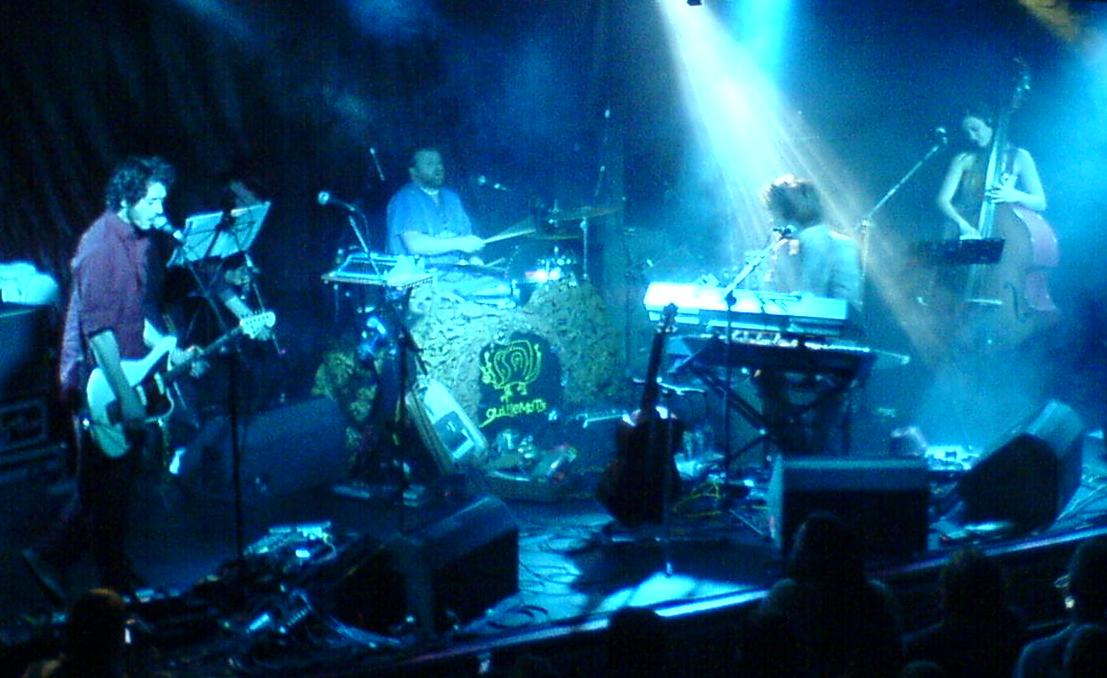
- From left to right: MC Lord Magrão, Greig Stewart, Fyfe Dangerfield, Aristazabal Hawkes

Background information
- Origin: London, United Kingdom
- Genres: Indie rock, alternative rock
- Years active: 2004–2013
- Labels: Fantastic Plastic, Polydor, Geffen Records, The state51 Conspiracy
- Past members: Fyfe Dangerfield; Aristazabal Hawkes; Greig Stewart; MC Lord Magrão
- Website: guillemots.com

Guillemots (stylised as gUiLLeMoTs) are an England-based indie rock band formed in November 2004, originally a four-piece of Fyfe Dangerfield, MC Lord Magrão (until his departure in 2013), Aristazabal Hawkes and Greig Stewart. The band formed in London, with members coming from England, Brazil, Canada and Scotland respectively.

Their first album, Through the Windowpane, was nominated for a Mercury Music Prize in 2006. The band experienced some chart success, with their single "Get Over It" reaching number 20 in the UK Singles Chart in March 2008. Their second album, Red, reached number 9 in the UK Albums Chart in the same month. After touring throughout 2008 and Dangerfield releasing a solo record, the band released their third record, Walk the River, on 18 April 2011. The band's fourth album, Hello Land!, was released 7 May 2012.

== History ==
=== Formation and early years (2004–2006) ===
Fyfe Dangerfield began writing songs in his native Birmingham and then in Bromsgrove. His early band, Senseless Prayer, recorded a session for John Peel's Radio 1 show in 1999. Dangerfield then began songwriting under the name "Fyfe Dangerfield and the Accident", and in 2004 he was featured alongside Misty's Big Adventure, Mike in Mono, Dreams of Tall Buildings, and X Is Greater Than Y on a promotional CD that was offered free with The Birmingham Post, called Broader Than Broad Street. He then joined old school friend, Paul "Booby" Tooby, on his "Ragamuffin Blues but Holes in my Shoes" tour.

Dangerfield had moved to Bromsgrove, attending Bromsgrove School in 1988; he moved to London in 2002, where he co-found Guillemots. He also became a music teacher for Cranbrook College.

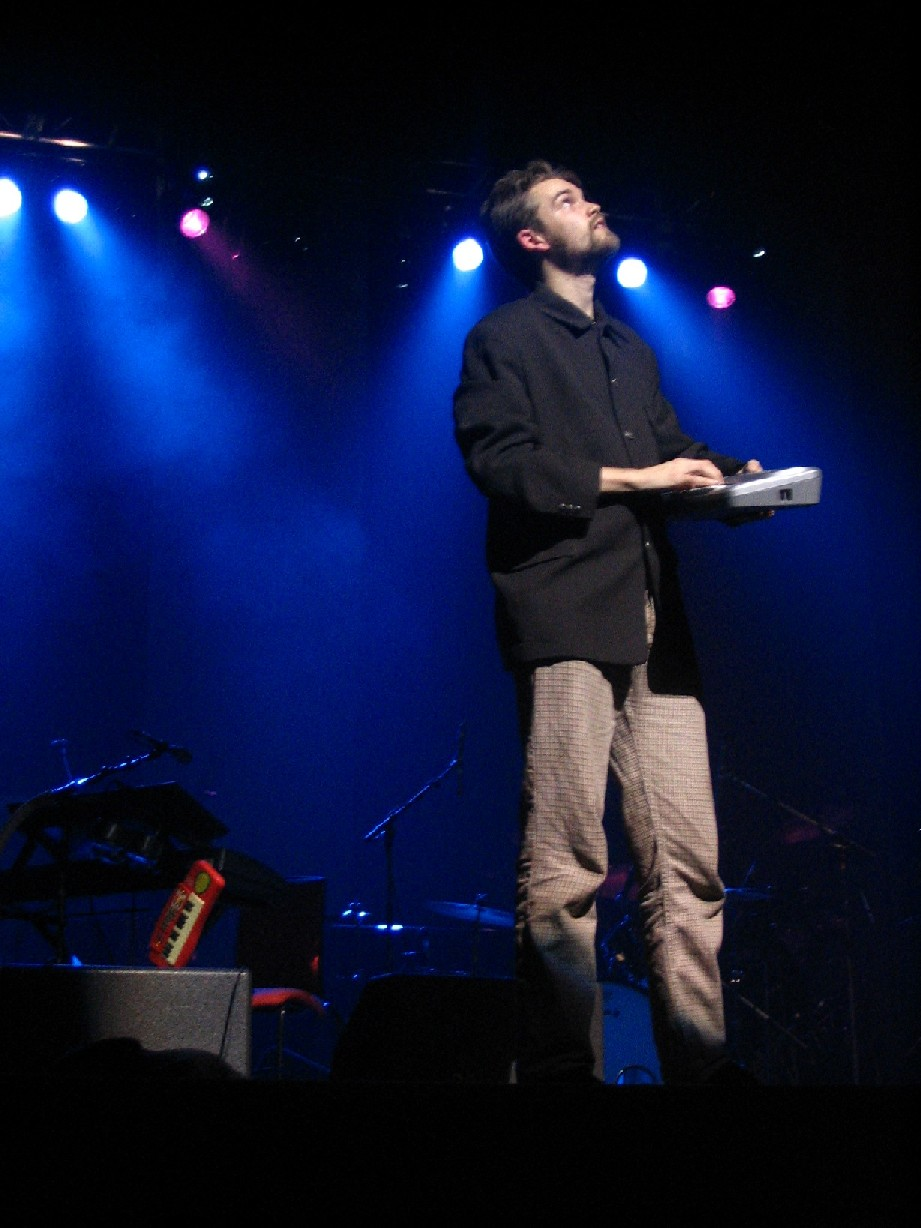
Fyfe during a performance in 2005

The name of the band is the plural of the name of a group of seabirds (but most often meaning the common guillemot, Uria aalge) and should be pronounced 'gillimott' (without a French accent). The four-piece have often been joined by two saxophone and woodwind players, Alex Ward and Chris Cundy, who are known as the "Bridled Guillemots" (a real-life variation of the band's namesake). Guillemots often use quirky musical instruments, such as the sound of a typewriter in the song "Who Left The Lights Off, Baby?", and MC Lord Magrao has used industrial power tools to create new sounds on their records.

Dangerfield, Ward and Cundy are also founding members of the jazz ensemble Gannets.

Birds are the source of inspiration for the band not just in name. For example, their 2006 EP From the Cliffs continues the Guillemot theme, the bird's natural habitat being steep sea cliffs. In their MySpace entry their influences are given as 'BIRDSONG first and foremost', although the only artist that all the band members have publicly stated as being an influence is Björk. Their first album features recordings of red-throated diver (Gavia stellata) and European robin (Erithacus rubecula), as well as the line 'flitting like a flycatcher', a reference to the mercurial movements of these birds, and the song "Redwings", after the thrush species of the same name. In June 2007, the band appeared on the BBC Four documentary, Why Birds Sing, contributing their musical talents to a Birdsong-inspired collaboration called "The Twitch".

The band was initially signed to Fantastic Plastic, who released their debut album in 2006, but after offers from several majors, they eventually moved to Polydor.

The band released their debut EP, I Saw Such Things in My Sleep, in September 2005; all 1000 copies sold out on the day of release. The band ended 2005 opening for Rufus Wainwright's sold-out UK tour and began 2006 by being awarded fifth place in the BBC Sound of 2006 survey. The single "We're Here" was named "Single of the Week" on the Jungalist website on 27 March 2006, and on 19 June 2006 they played their first Top of the Pops performance to promote their third single "Made-Up Lovesong No. 43". Guitarist MC Lord Magrao played his guitar to a set of mirrors, reflecting his performance to the crowd.

=== Through The Windowpane (2006–2008) ===
Guillemots' debut album, Through the Windowpane, was released on 10 July and reached number 17 in the album chart. The album's release date was timed so it would be eligible for the 2006 Mercury Music Prize, and the album did make the shortlist but lost out to Arctic Monkeys' debut Whatever People Say I Am, That's What I'm Not. It received a good deal of critical acclaim on its release, scoring an average of 81% on metacritic.com's overview of the critical response. During Paul McCartney's Radio 1 Legends show, celebrating the 40th anniversary of the station, he played some of his favorite songs. One of those was the song "Little Bear", which he called "a very brave way to open an album". He stated his admiration for the track's "beautiful orchestration".

During the recording sessions for the album, the band recorded an EP entitled Of the Night made up of one song written by each band member. It was released via the internet on Valentine's Day 2006 and performed live in its entirety at the BBC Electric Proms 2006, with the BBC Concert Orchestra. For their performance of "Bad Boyfriend" the band donned animal masks, and Fyfe cried, "Take me to orchestral paradise!" before the song's orchestral culmination. The EP was eventually released on CD and LP in November to independent music shops only. "Trains To Brazil" was promoted in September 2006 and was given out as "Single of the Week" on iTunes, as their fourth (second chart-eligible) single; a new version of "Annie, Let's Not Wait" was released as their next single on 15 January 2007.

=== Red and brief hiatus (2008–2010) ===
Their second album, Red, was released on 24 March 2008, preceded by the single "Get Over It" on 17 March. "Get Over It" became Guillemots' highest-placed single, reaching number 20 in the UK Singles Chart, while Red reached number 9 in the UK Albums Chart. MC Lord Magrao produced and directed the music videos for Get Over It and Kriss Kross. The album developed with a seemingly different style for each track and one reviewer compared it to "being like a 'That's What I Call Music' collection except it is all by one band and the quality is better than the average pop collection." The band then toured extensively throughout 2008, concluding with a much-celebrated final UK tour entitled Fishbone for a Drink Tour.

In an interview in late 2008, Fyfe told the reporter: "It’s good – it feels like the end of the first phase of the band."

After this, the band went into a hiatus. Fyfe released his first solo album, Fly Yellow Moon, in January 2010. He toured the record while together with the band and many feared that Fyfe's success as a solo artist could spell the end for Guillemots. Fyfe has since revealed that the band were still in contact and later writing together while he was promoting his solo album. On 18 June 2009, a post appeared on the Guillemots' official website stating that work had commenced on their third album. The band started rehearsing again in May 2010 following Fyfe's solo work and resumed recording on 7 June. The group finally finished the recording of a new album around the summer/autumn of 2010.

=== Walk the River (2010–2011) ===
In October Fyfe announced via Twitter that the album was finished, with mastering and final touches supposedly done in November. By December, a message appeared on the band's site informing of the imminent news with a countdown for 13 January, when it was revealed that a secret gig at an unknown location would occur on 27 January with clues for the venue before the date. Tickets sold out in 4 minutes.

Their third album, Walk the River, was released on 18 April 2011. The album was preceded by the single "The Basket", which was perceived as being more like the material on Red, though the rest of Walk the River can be better compared to Through the Windowpane. Upon the release of the album, fans were able to purchase a limited amount of the new album that was signed exclusively by the band. Fyfe and Greig performed a rendition of another single from the album, "I Don't Feel Amazing Now", in a little woodland by a disused railway line in North London for WatchListenTell.

Following the album's release, they did a series of secret gigs in Birmingham, London, Manchester, and Glasgow. The Guillemots played sets at different festivals in the UK and Europe throughout the summer of 2011. In September the group commenced a tour of Europe, before playing four shows in Brazil and Argentina during October. They then returned to perform dates in the UK during October and November, including at the Stanley Theatre, Liverpool. In Liverpool there was a performance of the new song "Southern Winds" and during the song "Falling Out of Reach", the band managed to keep on playing after a local man shouted out "calm down" after Fyfe had just sung "calm down", although the crowd was in hysterics.

=== Hello Land! (2012–present) ===
In January 2012, Fyfe revealed the band had written a lot of new material and was currently recording a new album, while new songs were played at their UK shows. On 7 May, the band announced through their website that they would be releasing four new albums throughout 2012, under the project title The Emporium of Fine Things. The first, Hello Land! coming out the same day on CD and download. The albums would be released in partnership with The state51 Conspiracy and would come out concerning the seasons. The band admitted that Hello Land!, the spring-themed album, had come out a little late. The summer record was tentatively titled On Summer Island, and was due in September 2012 but has yet to be released.

In April 2013 Fyfe Dangerfield posted an apology stating that he had been back and forth between the UK and Norway where the album was being recorded but was very excited about the project and hoped it would be completed soon. It is still the band's intention that they release the series of four albums but they had not been able to achieve this in one year as they had originally intended. On 11 June 2013 MC Lord Magrão posted on the band's Facebook page to announce that he had made the decision to leave Guillemots.

There has been no further information regarding the albums or indeed any further activity since then, and the band's social media profiles have been silent since 2015. While there has never been an official statement, it seems the band are now defunct, although Fyfe Dangerfield has released solo projects.

== Live performances ==
Guillemots have made numerous live performances since 2004. Their first full-scale UK tour began in April 2006. After a brief period putting the finishing touches to their debut album, and performing a set for Gideon Coe's BBC 6 Music show in June, they began a second leg of dates in October, which ran until early November.

In October 2006 at the first BBC Electric Proms, the band performed seven tracks with a full orchestra, with songs transcribed and arranged for such a performance by Dangerfield himself. This included a rare performance of the song "Bad Boyfriend" where the entire band donned animal masks.

Guillemots at Lovebox Weekender festival in London, July 2006

Support on Guillemots' tours is often varied, usually with two support acts for each show – one main support who stay with them for the majority of the tours' dates (Misty's Big Adventure in early 2006 and The Last Town Chorus for their autumn tour), as well as a first support act, specific to the location. Another common support/friend of the band is Joan as Police Woman, who the band met while performing as support for Rufus Wainwright.

Guillemots have also performed live with political songwriter Get Cape. Wear Cape. Fly and supported Snow Patrol at Wembley Arena in December 2006, in a performance culminating in a lightsaber duel between the band's tour manager and MC's guitar tech on stage as Dangerfield played percussion on a tray.

The band appeared at the V Festival both in 2007 and in 2008. They played Marlay Park on 25 August 2007 as one of the support acts to Damien Rice.

Guillemots, along with Sons and Daughters, supported KT Tunstall at the 2008 Eden Sessions, held at the Eden Project. The band played a free concert in Huddersfield on 29 June 2008, along with Elliot Minor and The Script. They also played a set on the O2 Wireless Main Stage in London's Hyde Park on 4 July 2008, supporting acts such as The Wombats, Dirty Pretty Things, Beck and Morrissey.

In June 2008, Guillemots had their Kentish Town Forum gig filmed and later broadcast on Channelbee.

They performed the Uncut Arena at the 2008 Latitude Festival on Saturday 19 July; in addition to this, they also played a live set to a screening of David Lynch's film Eraserhead at the Music & Film Arena the preceding Friday. The band performed as the first warm-up act, followed by Editors, for R.E.M. on 27 August 2008 at the Southampton Rose Bowl.

In September 2008, they played at the 2008 Orange RockCorps Gig in the Royal Albert Hall, some of which was broadcast on T4.

On 5 September 2008, they played a gig supporting Travis at The Quarry in Shrewsbury, Shropshire. Miles Hammond, a local 12-year-old who had posted a YouTube video showing how to play the intro to "Kriss Kross", was invited on stage to play the intro to the song at the gig. He and his 13-year-old brother Lewis Hammond were also invited back on stage to play percussion, including scaffolding components, in 'São Paulo', the last song in their set that night.

In December 2008, they played an exclusive impromptu Super Busking gig in London's Covent Garden as part of Covent Garden's Christmas Delight celebrations. The performance took place in-sync with a visual light display by United Visual Artists in aid of homeless charity Crisis.

In February 2009, they played themselves and performed one of their songs in the episode "Last Night a DJ Saved My Life" of the TV series FM.

On 13 April 2012, it was announced the band would headline Saturday at the 2012 2000Trees Festival in Gloucestershire.

== Members ==
- Fyfe Dangerfield (also known as Fyfe Antony Dangerfield Hutchins) – singer, keyboard and guitar
- MC Lord Magrão – guitar, bass guitar, mandolin, accordion, xylophone, theremin, synth bass, typewriter, musical saw, electric drill, melodica, melodeon
- Aristazabal Hawkes – double bass and percussion
- Greig Stewart (also known as Rican Caol) – drums and percussion

=== The "Bridled" Guillemots ===
- Alex Ward – alto sax
- Christopher Cundy – soprano sax, tenor sax, baritone sax and bass clarinet

=== Guest artists ===
- Shingai Shoniwa of The Noisettes contributed backing vocals to "Made-up Lovesong" and "Over the Stairs".
- Ida Maria dueted with Fyfe in the track "Words".

== Discography ==
=== Albums ===
List of albums, with selected chart positions
Title	Album details	Peak chart positions					
Title	Album details	UK	UK Indie	BEL (FL)	FRA	IRE	SCO
Through the Windowpane	Released: 10 July 2006; Label: Polydor	17	—	88	178	60	19
Red	Released: 24 March 2008; Label: Polydor	9	—	—	—	93	8
Walk the River	Released: 18 April 2011; Label: Polydor	26	—	—	—	—	28
Hello Land!	Released: 7 May 2012; Label: The state51 Conspiracy	—	50	—	—	—	—
"—" denotes a recording that did not chart or was not released in that territory.

=== EPs ===
List of EPs, with selected chart positions
Title	Album details	Peak chart positions		
Title	Album details	UK Budget	UK Indie	FRA
I Saw Such Things in My Sleep EP	Released: 5 September 2005; Label: Fantastic Plastic	32	49	—
Of the Night	Released: 14 February 2006; Label: Fantastic Plastic	—	—	—
From the Cliffs	Released: 14 March 2006; Label: Fantastic Plastic	—	22	151
"—" denotes a recording that did not chart or was not released in that territory.

=== Singles ===
Title	Year	Peak chart positions				Album
Title	Year	UK	BEL (WA)	POL	SCO	Album
"Trains to Brazil"	2005	—	—	—	—	From the Cliffs
"We're Here"	2006	156	—	—	—	Through the Windowpane
"Made-Up Lovesong No. 43"	2006	23	—	—	18	Through the Windowpane
"Trains to Brazil" (Re-issue)	2006	36	—	—	32	Through the Windowpane
"Annie, Let's Not Wait"	2007	27	—	—	18	Through the Windowpane
"Get Over It"	2008	20	—	—	14	Red
"Falling Out of Reach"	2008	49	—	—	28	Red
"Kriss Kross" / "Clarion"	2008	— (Note: "Kriss Kross / Clarion" did not enter the UK Singles Chart, but peaked at number 49 on the UK Physical Singles Chart Top 100.)	—	—	99	Red
"The Basket"	2011	—	92	—	—	Walk the River
"I Must Be A Lover"	2011	—	—	—	—	Walk the River
"I Don't Feel Amazing Now"	2011	—	—	42	—	Walk the River
"Fleet"	2012	—	—	59	—	Hello Land!
"—" denotes a recording that did not chart or was not released in that territory.

=== Other contributions ===
- The Saturday Sessions: The Dermot O'Leary Show (2007, EMI) – "Made-Up Lovesong 43"

== Awards and nominations ==
- Through The Windowpane was nominated for the 2006 Mercury Music Prize.
- The band was nominated for Best Live Act at the 2007 BRIT Awards.
- Red was nominated for Best Album Art at the 2009 NME Awards.
- Made-up Love Song #43 was nominated for Song of the Year at the 2007 Mojo Awards.

== See also ==
- List of songs recorded by Guillemots
