= From the Cliffs =

EP by Guillemots
- Released: 14 March 2006
- Genre: Indie rock
- Length: 40:03
- Label: Fantastic Plastic Records
- Producer: Bryan Mills, Fyfe Dangerfield

Guillemots chronology
Of the Night (2006)	From the Cliffs (2006)	Through the Windowpane (2006)

Professional ratings
Review scores
Source	Rating
AllMusic	3.5/5 stars
Pitchfork	7.4/10

From the Cliffs is an EP by multinational indie rock band Guillemots, released on 14 March 2006. It compiles their previous releases, the I Saw Such Things in My Sleep EP and the first "Trains to Brazil" single, to form a mini-album in itself (along with the new opening track, "Sake", and, for the Japanese release, two additional tracks: "Moonlight" and "Pa Moila").

== Track listing ==
All tracks are written by Fyfe Dangerfield, except where noted

No.	Title	Length
1.	"Sake"	0:39
2.	"Trains to Brazil"	4:03
3.	"Made-Up Lovesong #43"	3:34
4.	"Over the Stairs"	9:02
5.	"Who Left the Lights Off, Baby?"	5:02
6.	"Cats Eyes"	6:44
7.	"Go Away" (Guillemots)	7:46
8.	"My Chosen One"	3:13
Total length:		40:03

Japanese bonus tracks
No.	Title	Length
9.	"Moonlight"	4:40
10.	"Pa Moila"	4:06
