= Of the Night (EP) =

EP by Guillemots
- Released: 14 February 2006
- Recorded: 2006
- Genre: Indie rock
- Length: 20:06
- Label: Fantastic Plastic

Guillemots chronology
Trains to Brazil (2005)	Of the Night (2006)	From the Cliffs (2006)

Of the Night is an EP by British indie rock band Guillemots. It was released on 14 February 2006. It was available for download from the band's website, and contains four tracks.

The EP was re-released on CD and 12" vinyl on 23 October 2006 on the bands' own label, "Sea Accident". According to early reports by the band, it was to contain a DVD of fan-directed music videos, selected as competition winners. However, lack of interest in this competition led to the decision not to include such a DVD.

== Track listing ==
1. "She's Evil" – 3:18
2. "The Rising Tide" – 3:53
3. "Bad Boyfriend" – 9:10
4. "By the Water" – 3:47

== Performance history ==
In October 2006, the band performed all 4 songs from this EP, in order, as part of their set at the Electric Proms with the BBC Concert Orchestra. A highlight of this was the intense performance of "Bad Boyfriend" which saw the entire band donning animal masks and climaxed with Fyfe's request of "Take me to Orchestral Paradise!". This was followed by "By the Water", a song which was a large part of the band's Autumn 2006 touring set. This song is notable because it sees double-bassist Aristazabal Hawkes perform her first song with the band as lead vocalist, rather than Fyfe Dangerfield.
