= Stay Hungry Stay Foolish =

Book by Rashmi Bansal

- Author: Rashmi Bansal
- Language: English
- Genre: Inspirational Non-fiction
- Publisher: CIIE.CO, IIM Ahmedabad
- Publication date: 2008
- Publication place: India
- Media type: Book
- Pages: 394
- ISBN: 978-81-904530-1-1

Stay Hungry Stay Foolish is a 2008 book by the Indian non-fiction author Rashmi Bansal. Stay Hungry Stay Foolish created a new record in Indian publishing by selling over 300,000 copies and has been translated into eight languages. "Stay Hungry. Stay Foolish" is a famous quote of American business magnate Steve Jobs, which he originally took from last page of the Whole Earth Catalog published in October 1974.

It features the stories of 25 MBAs from IIM Ahmedabad who left lucrative jobs to follow the rough road of entrepreneurship. It is an IIM Ahmedabad CIIE (Centre for Innovation, Incubation and Entrepreneurship) publication. Bansal is the author of a number of other books on entrepreneurship: Connect the Dots, I Have a Dream, Poor Little Rich Slum, Follow Every Rainbow, and Take me Home, Arise Awake, and God's Own Kitchen.

== About the title ==
In 2005, during his famous commencement speech at Stanford University, Steve Jobs quoted the farewell message placed on the back cover of the 1974 edition of the Whole Earth Catalog: "Stay hungry. Stay foolish."
