= Fly Yellow Moon =

Studio album by Fyfe Dangerfield
- Released: (United Kingdom) 18 January 2010; 30 April 2010
- Recorded: December 2008 – 2009
- Genre: Alternative
- Length: 40:18
- Label: Polydor
- Producer: Adam Noble, Bernard Butler

Singles from Fly Yellow Moon
- 1. "She Needs Me" Released: 11 January 2010; 2. "When You Walk in the Room" Released: 9 February 2010; 3. "Faster Than the Setting Sun" Released: 26 April 2010; 4. "She's Always a Woman" Released: 3 May 2010; 5. "Barricades" Released: 6 September 2010

Professional ratings
Review scores
Source	Rating
BBC	(very favourable) link
Drowned in Sound	link
The Guardian	link
musicomh	link
Ragged Words	link
Slant Magazine	link
NME	link
Pitchfork Media	(4.7/10) link

Fly Yellow Moon is the debut solo album from British artist Fyfe Dangerfield, known as the frontman of the band, Guillemots. It was released on 18 January 2010 in the United Kingdom on Polydor Records. "She Needs Me" was released as the lead single in the UK, while "When You Walk in the Room" was released in the U.S. (in the UK it was given away for free on Dangerfield's web site). "Faster Than the Setting Sun" was released as the second UK single.

A deluxe edition of the album was released on 17 May 2010 featuring the single version of "Faster Than the Setting Sun", "She's Always a Woman" and two further bonus tracks.

== Track listing ==
Standard version
No.	Title	Length
1.	"When You Walk in the Room"	3:26
2.	"So Brand New"	3:29
3.	"Barricades"	4:03
4.	"High on the Tide"	4:57
5.	"Faster Than the Setting Sun"	3:40
6.	"Livewire"	4:20
7.	"Firebird"	3:48
8.	"She Needs Me"	4:52
9.	"Don't Be Shy"	3:59
10.	"Any Direction"	3:44
Total length:		40:18

Deluxe edition
No.	Title	Length
11.	"She's Always a Woman"	3:14
12.	"Awake, Asleep"	4:17
13.	"Let's Start Again"	3:57
14.	"Faster Than the Setting Sun" (Single version)	3:11
Total length:		54:57

Bonus tracks
No.	Title	Length
1.	"Arrows"	2:53
2.	"Headache"	4:31
3.	"Colour Me In"	3:01
4.	"If I Was Lost"	3:16
5.	"Don't Make Me Lose It"	4:57
6.	"You Can Take That World Off Your Shoulder"	3:51
7.	"Appreciating You"	5:09
8.	"Computer Game"	4:41
Total length:		40:37

== Personnel ==
The following people are credited on the album:

Production

- Adam Noble – producer, mixing
- Bernard Butler – mixing, additional production (tracks 5, 8, 13)
- Dick Beetham – mastering

Additional musicians

- Matt Ingram – drums (tracks 1, 3, 10)
- Jamie Morrison – drums (all other tracks)
- Laurence Love Greed – whistling (track 4)
- Bernard Butler – electric guitar (track 8)

Artwork

- David Robinson – photography
- Denis Gabillat – art direction
