= Rashmi Bansal =

Indian non-fiction writer and entrepreneur

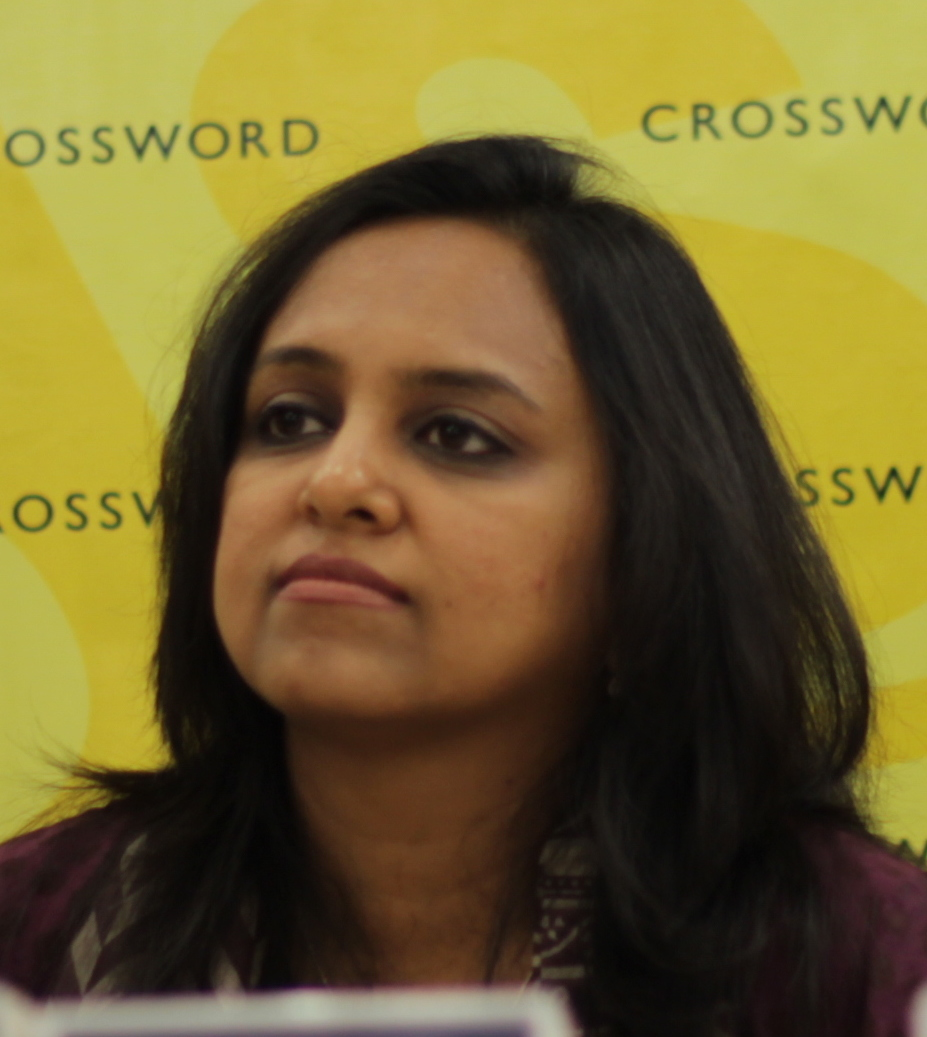
- Bansal in 2011
- Education: IIM Ahmedabad; Sophia College for Women
- Occupation: Author
- Notable work: Stay Hungry Stay Foolish; Connect the Dots; I Have a Dream; Poor Little Rich Slum; Follow Every Rainbow; Take Me Home; Arise, Awake; God's Own Kitchen; Touch the Sky

Rashmi Bansal is an Indian non-fiction writer and entrepreneur. As of 2019, she is the author of nine books on entrepreneurship. Her first book, Stay Hungry Stay Foolish, traced the progress of 25 MBA entrepreneurs and sold over 500,000 copies.

== Early life and education ==
Bansal grew up at the Tata Institute of Fundamental Research in South Mumbai where her father was an astrophysicist. After attending St Joseph's High School in Colaba, she studied at Sophia College for Women before earning an MBA from the Indian Institute of Management Ahmedabad.

== Career in journalism ==
On graduating from IIM, she worked as a brand manager for the Times of India. After developing a youth page for The Independent, she went on to found JAM (Just Another Magazine), a youth magazine in collaboration with her husband.

== Career as an author ==
She was inspired to write Stay Hungry Stay Foolish (2008) by a professor at IIM Ahmedabad who suggested she cover the experiences of 25 entrepreneurs from the school. Her next book, Connect the Dots (2010), traced the progress of entrepreneurs without MBAs. Her book I Have a Dream (2011) focused on social entrepreneurs.

In an interview with Heather Timmons of the New York Times, Bansal explained she decided to use Hinglish as it provides a more direct representation of people's voices and "makes them more real". More recently, Bansal has written four books on entrepreneurs: Poor Little Rich Slum, Follow Every Rainbow, Take Me Home and Arise Awake.

== Publications ==
- Bansal, Rashmi. Stay Hungry Stay Foolish. Westland. 2008. ISBN 978-9381626719.
- Bansal, Rashmi. Connect the Dots. Westland. 2010. ISBN 978-93-81626-70-2.
- Bansal, Rashmi, I Have a Dream. Westland. 2011. ISBN 978-93-80658-38-4.
- Bansal, Rashmi. Poor Little Rich Slum. Westland. 2012. ISBN 978-93-81626-18-4.
- Bansal, Rashmi. Follow Every Rainbow. Westland. 2013. ISBN 978-93-82618-42-3.
- Bansal, Rashmi. Take me Home. Westland. 2014. ISBN 978-93-83260-80-5.
- Bansal, Rashmi. Arise Awake. Westland. 2015. ISBN 978-93-84030-87-2.
- Bansal, Rashmi. God's Own Kitchen. Westland. 2017.
