= I Saw Such Things in My Sleep EP =

EP by Guillemots
- Released: 5 September 2005
- Genre: Indie rock
- Length: 24:30
- Label: Fantastic Plastic Records

Guillemots chronology
I Saw Such Things in My Sleep EP (2005)	Trains To Brazil (2005)

Professional ratings
Review scores
Source	Rating
Drowned in Sound	6/10
Stylus	B+

I Saw Such Things in My Sleep EP is the debut EP from British indie rock band Guillemots released in 2005. It comprises 4 tracks and sold out on the day of release after much attention from radio presenters across the UK. A limited version of the EP was also released in vinyl 10".

Only 1,000 copies of the EP were pressed. The four tracks were re-released on the international mini-album From The Cliffs in 2006.

== Track listing ==
1. "Who Left The Lights Off Baby?" – 5:04
2. "Cats Eyes" – 6:43
3. "Made Up Lovesong #43" – 3:35
4. "Over The Stairs" – 9:08
