= Still Hungry (Ace album) =

Studio album by Ace (Skunk Anansie)
- Released: 30 June 2003
- Recorded: 2002–2003
- Genre: Rock
- Length: 51:42
- Label: Snapper Music
- Producer: Ace

Ace (Skunk Anansie) chronology
Post Orgasmic Chill (1999)	Still Hungry (2003)	Best Of Skunk Anansie (2009)

Still Hungry is the first solo album by the Skunk Anansie guitarist Ace (Martin Ivor Kent, 30 March 1967, Cheltenham). The album was released under the name Ace Sounds. Vocals on the album were provided by various singers.

== Track listing ==
1. "Jet From California" (featuring Jason Perry)
2. "Back Up" (featuring Benji)
3. "One Way Love" (featuring Lemmy)
4. "There's No Pleasin' Some People" (featuring Saffron)
5. "No Fear of Falling" (featuring Shingai Shoniwa)
6. "Skiers of Texas" (featuring JJ Burnel)
7. "Glass Ceiling" (featuring Ben Edwards of Miocene)
8. "Your Face Hurts" (featuring Yap)
9. "45 Grave" (featuring Cliff Jones)
10. "Prisoner" (featuring Skye)
11. "This Is the Last Time" (featuring Smokey Bandits)
12. "Mind's Taken Over" (featuring Kim Nail)
13. "Phoenix" (featuring Shingai Shoniwa)
14. "We Be" (featuring Smokey Bandits)
