= Technology Development Board =

Technology Development Board (TDB), is a statutory body established by Government of India under Technology Development Board Act, 1995, to promote development and commercialization of indigenous technology and adaptation of imported technology for much wider application. The board consists of 11 Board members. The Government reconstituted the Board in March 2000. The Board plays a pro-active role by encouraging enterprises to take up technology-oriented products. The board provides equity capital or loans to industrial concerns and financial assistance to research and development institutions. The loans carry a simple interest rate of 5% per annum.

== GITA ==
In order to stimulate private sector's investment in R&D, TDB established Global Innovation & Technology Alliance (GITA) as a Section 25 company in a joint venture between Confederation of Indian Industry (CII) and TDB with an equity contribution of 51:49 respectively.

The GITA will assist Department of Science & Technology (DST) in implementing industrial research and development programmes with different countries under bilateral and multilateral science and technology cooperation agreements. In these country-specific programmes, if one industry from India and one industry from another country proposed jointly to do R&D for developing a marketable product, both the governments will provide financial support up to 50% of project cost to their respective industries.

The GITA has been envisaged as an industry-driven body for supporting competitive innovation clusters which in future can be entrusted with administering of Innovation Fund under a PPP model, IP acquisition by the government for non-exclusive licensing for public and social good, sectors of R&D and promotion of innovation culture in centres of excellence.

== Venture capital funds ==
In India, UTI was the first company to start a venture scheme under the name of India Technology Venture Scheme in 1997. In 1999 UTI's executive trustee met the then chairperson, TDB and secretary, TDB and requested TDB's participation in venture capital fund. The board in its 13th meeting dated 19 November 1999 approved TDB's participation in UTI-India Technology Venture Unit Scheme (ITVUS) with a commitment of Rs. 25 Cr. This was the first commitment by TDB in any venture capital fund, and the agreement for this was signed on 6 July 2000. Thereafter on a case-by-case basis, TDB' board took the decision to participate in the different venture funds (as given in the list as annexure) as limited liability partner.

So far, TDB has been participating in venture funds which are mainly concentrated in technology orientation, early-stage projects and also on investment in state-level funds where TDB's presence was inadequate. The initiative of TDB has also given the confidence to venture capitalist or private equity funds to come up in a big way to support the technology-based projects with a pronounced emphasis on sectors witch which are growth drivers of Indian economy.

The TDB has so far supported 12 venture capital funds with a total commitment of Rs. 310 Cr. leveraging total funds aggregating to Rs. 2713 Cr. from other investors.

== National awards ==
The board instituted a national award for successful commercialization of indigenous technology by an industrial concern. The national award of Rs. 10 Lakhs is shared equally between the industrial concern that has successfully commercialized the indigenous technology and the developer/provider of such technology.

In August 2000, TDB introduced a cash award of Rs. 2 lakh and a trophy to an SSI unit that has successfully commercialized a technology-based product. The first SSI award was given on 11 May 2001 and thereafter it has been decided to give the Award for SSI Unit every year on the Occasion of Technology Day, i.e. 11 May. The cash awards were later revised to Rs. 5 lakh in 2011–2012.
