= Made-Up Lovesong 43 =

"Made-Up Lovesong #43"

Single by Guillemots

from the album Through the Windowpane
- Released: 26 June 2006
- Recorded: 2005–2006
- Genre: Alternative rock, chamber pop
- Length: 3:41
- Label: Polydor
- Songwriter(s): Fyfe Dangerfield
- Producer(s): Fyfe Dangerfield

Guillemots singles chronology
"We're Here" (2006)	"Made-Up Lovesong #43" (2006)	"Trains to Brazil" (2006)

"Made-Up Lovesong #43" is a song by Guillemots, from their album, Through the Windowpane. It was released as a single; their first to be chart-eligible, reaching number 23 in the UK Singles Chart. An older version of the song appears on I Saw Such Things in My Sleep EP and From the Cliffs.

== Track listing ==
CD single

1. "Made-Up Lovesong #43"
2. "Woody Brown River" (demo)
3. "The Dormouse & The Meerkat"
4. "Made-Up Lovesong #43" (Video)

7-inch Picture Disc

1. "Made-Up Lovesong #43"
2. "Parafuso"
3. "Atina"

7-inch single

1. "Made-Up Lovesong #43"
2. "Dunes "
