= Little Bear (song) =

Song by Guillemots

from the album Through the Windowpane
- Recorded: 2006
- Genre: Baroque pop
- Length: 4:49
- Label: Polydor
- Songwriter(s): Fyfe Dangerfield

"Little Bear" is a song by indie band Guillemots. It was written by Guillemots frontman Fyfe Dangerfield and is the opening track of the band's debut album, Through the Windowpane (2006).

In a radio programme celebrating the 40th anniversary of BBC station Radio 1, Paul McCartney named "Little Bear" as one of his "all-time favourite songs". McCartney called the track "a very brave way to open an album", and praised its "beautiful orchestration".
