= Red (Guillemots album) =

Studio album by Guillemots
- Released: 24 March 2008
- Genre: Indie rock
- Length: 50:38
- Label: Polydor
- Producers: Adam Noble, Guillemots

Guillemots chronology
Through the Windowpane (2006)	Red (2008)	Walk the River (2011)

Professional ratings
Review scores
Source	Rating
AllMusic	link
Digital Spy	link
Drowned in Sound	8/10 link
The Guardian	Link
The Independent	Link
NME	4/10 link
The Observer	link
Pitchfork	5.8/10 link
The Telegraph	Positive link
The Times	Link
This Is Fake DIY	7/10 link

Red is the second album from British indie rock band Guillemots. It was released on 24 March 2008 in the United Kingdom and reached number 9 in the UK Album Charts. The album release was preceded by the single "Get Over It" on 17 March.

== Track listing ==
No.	Title	Length
1.	"Kriss Kross"	4:24
2.	"Big Dog"	3:50
3.	"Falling Out of Reach"	4:54
4.	"Get Over It"	4:19
5.	"Clarion"	4:04
6.	"Last Kiss"	3:26
7.	"Cockateels"	4:31
8.	"Words"	6:31
9.	"Standing on the Last Star"	4:31
10.	"Don't Look Down"	4:39
11.	"Take Me Home"	5:36

Also included is the video to Get Over It.

== Production ==
Ida Maria provided backing vocals on the track "Words".

== Album art ==
The album cover and inner sleeve were inspired by the René Magritte paintings Le chambre d'écoute ("The Listening Room"; 1953) and Le tombeau des lutteurs ("The Tomb of the Wrestlers"; 1961).

The image on the album cover was taken at Rockingham Motor Speedway in one of the circuit's pedestrian tunnels.

=== Certifications ===
Region	Certification	Certified units/sales
United Kingdom	—	51,424
