= Trains to Brazil =

Single by Guillemots

from the album Through the Windowpane
- Released: 5 December 2005
- Recorded: 2005
- Genre: Indie rock
- Length: 15:46
- Label: Fantastic Plastic
- Songwriter: Fyfe Dangerfield

Guillemots singles chronology
"Trains to Brazil" (2005)	"Of the Night" (2006)

"Trains to Brazil" is the debut single by England-based indie rock band Guillemots, which appears on their 2006 releases Through the Windowpane and From the Cliffs. The 2005 single contains three tracks and was released on CD and in limited vinyl 10-inch formats. It was later re-released chart eligibly on 11 September 2006, peaking at number 36.

== Overview ==
In an interview for BBC Brazil, MC Lord Magrão, the band's guitar player, explained that the song title "Trains to Brazil" is a reference to the fatal incident involving the Brazilian Jean Charles de Menezes, who was shot by the police on the London Underground, and that the band's singer/keyboardist Fyfe Dangerfield composed the song in 2002 originally under the title "Life Song".

Fyfe describes the title track as follows:

It was weird, I wrote in 2002 and was sort of thinking about the whole Twin Towers thing, but then a couple of months before the London bombings we decided to drag this song out and do it as a single, and then all that stuff happened. On my birthday, as fate would have it – 7 July. Very odd. But yes, it's also just a song about appreciating life, I guess.

All of the tracks from this single appeared on the 2006 international release "From the Cliffs".

The B-side "Go Away" appeared on a compilation CD from British music magazine NME.

== Track listings ==
=== Original release ===
1. "Trains to Brazil" (Fyfe Dangerfield) – 4:01
2. "Go Away" – 7:47
3. "My Chosen One" – 3:14

=== Re-issue ===
==== CD ====
1. "Trains to Brazil"
2. "White Rag" (Demo)
3. "Blue Eyes"

==== 7-inch ====
1. "Trains to Brazil"
2. "Witch Doctor"

==== 7-inch ====
1. "Trains to Brazil"
2. "You Can Look (But You Can't Touch)" (featuring Freakshow)
3. "All The People Say"
