= Aristazabal Hawkes =

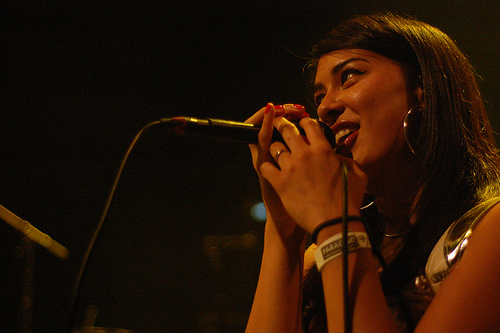
- Hawkes performing in 2008

Background information
- Born: Aristazabal Emi Chen Hawkes; Sointula, British Columbia, Canada
- Occupation: Musician
- Instruments: Double bass, vocals, bass guitar, piano, keyboards, drums
- Labels: Fantastic Plastic, Polydor, The state51 Conspiracy
- Member of: Guillemots
- Website: guillemots.com

Aristazabal Emi Chen Hawkes is the double bass player for the British indie band Guillemots. She was born in Sointula, on Malcolm Island in British Columbia, Canada. Hawkes is of mixed Chinese and Japanese ancestry. She has studied piano classically, and jazz at the New School in New York City.

She used to work on a cruise ship where she claims she only played Frank Sinatra songs. She cites some of her influences as Ron Carter, Paul Chambers and Charles Mingus. During an interview in the summer of 2006, it was also mentioned that fellow band member Fyfe Dangerfield had bought the Van Morrison album Astral Weeks for her (Richard Davis plays the upright bass on this album). She claims that she is "the biggest sucker for hip-hop and R&B in the group".

On an episode of Never Mind the Buzzcocks, Fyfe said that Aristazabal had found the perfect note to give a lady an orgasm, but she wouldn't tell the rest of the band what it was. She later revealed that this was a joke.

She wrote and performed the song "By the Water" from Guillemots' EP Of the Night, and sings lead vocals on the track "Last Kiss" from their 2008 album, Red.
