= MC Lord Magrão =

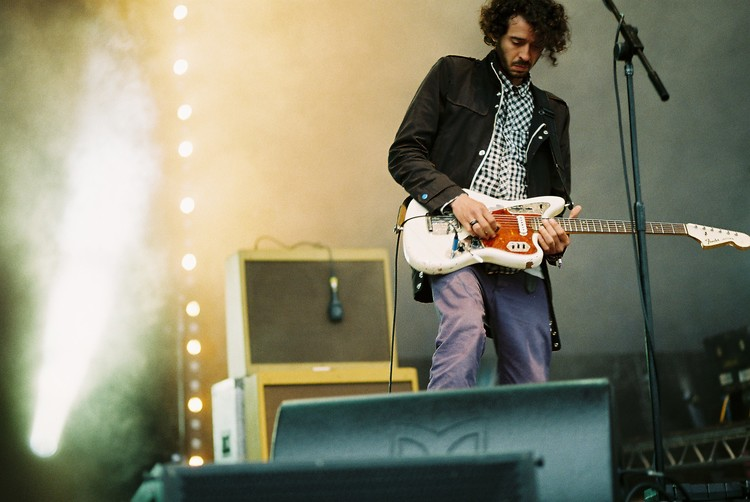
- MC Lord Magrão

Background information
- Also known as: mCLoRDmAGrãO
- Born: 5 October 1978 (age 47)
- Origin: São Paulo, Brazil
- Genres: Alternative rock; musique concrète; electronica; film score; experimental rock; trip hop
- Occupations: Musician, composer, music producer, sound designer
- Instruments: Guitars, prepared guitar, bass, baritone guitar, mandolin, vocals, keyboards, drums, programming, turntables, synths, theremin, accordion, melodeon, melodica, musical saw, xylophone, metallophone, typewriter, pedal steel guitar, clarinet, trumpet
- Years active: 1994–present
- Labels: Fantastic Plastic, Universal Music, Polydor, Geffen, The state51 Conspiracy, Hero Records, Stargazed Records
- Formerly of: Guillemots, LUNGS, Prendedor
- Website: http://www.mclordmagrao.com/

Ricardo Bombine Pimentel (born October 5, 1978), known professionally as MC Lord Magrão (stylized as mCLoRDmAGrãO), is a Brazilian-British multi-instrumentalist, composer, songwriter and music producer best known as the former guitarist of English indie rock band Guillemots. The band were nominated for a BRIT Award and the Mercury Music Prize.

He is known for his use of unusual instruments, most notably using electric power drills on his guitar and playing the typewriter and a giant clothes peg percussively.

Notable songwriting contributions to Guillemots include the bassline and main guitar riff on the song "Get Over It", the main riff on the song "Kriss Kross", and the main guitar riff on the song "The Basket". He also wrote the instrumental "Spring Bells", and the songs "She's Evil", "Monotonia" and "Blue Eyes".

In 2009, Pimentel performed with Daniel Johnston at his Union Chapel show. They performed some of Johnston's classic songs including Speeding Motorcycle, Casper the Friendly Ghost, Don't Let the Sun Go Down on Your Grievances amongst others. Pimentel primarily played accordion, melodica and xylophone.

== Early life ==
Born in São Paulo, Pimentel originally studied photography at Senac but dropped out after a year to focus on music. He played guerrilla gigs around São Paulo with Prendedor, NonFone and Trio Charango.

In 2001, Pimentel relocated to Barcelona, Spain, enduring months of homelessness and working as a street artist with NonFone before eventually moving to London, England.

== Influences ==
In interviews he has stated that he listens to bands such as Ween, Einstürzende Neubauten, Fantômas, Beck, Daniel Johnston and Brazilian musicians such as Tom Zé, Chico Buarque, and Hermeto Pascoal. His favourite musicians include Robert Johnson, Kurt Cobain, Mike Patton and Blixa Bargeld.

== Other work ==
He also works with photography and directs and produces music videos and short films. Right, So What Are You Thinking? (2008) was his first short film followed by ILK (2009). He has written and directed the videos for Guillemots Get Over It, Take Me Home and Kriss Kross.

He is credited with writing the music for the 2015 short film Boris in the Forest.
