= Fyfe Dangerfield =

- Dangerfield performs in Amsterdam on 8 June 2008.

Background information
- Born: Fyfe Antony Dangerfield Hutchins; 7 July 1980 (age 46); Moseley, Birmingham, England
- Origin: Bromsgrove, Worcestershire, England
- Genres: Indie rock, contemporary classical music, jazz, improvised music
- Occupations: Musician; songwriter
- Instruments: Vocals; piano; guitar; bass guitar
- Years active: 2000–present
- Labels: Polydor; Fantastic Plastic; The state51 Conspiracy

Fyfe Antony Dangerfield Hutchins (born 7 July 1980) is an English musician, composer and songwriter. Best known as the founding member of the indie rock band Guillemots, his work has also extended into jazz, improvised music and contemporary classical composition.

== Early life ==
Born in Moseley, Birmingham, in 1980, Dangerfield moved to Bromsgrove at the age of eight. He studied at Bromsgrove School where he was also the singer in the band Senseless Prayer. He was also a music teacher at Cranbrook College for a brief period.

== Career ==
=== Compositions ===
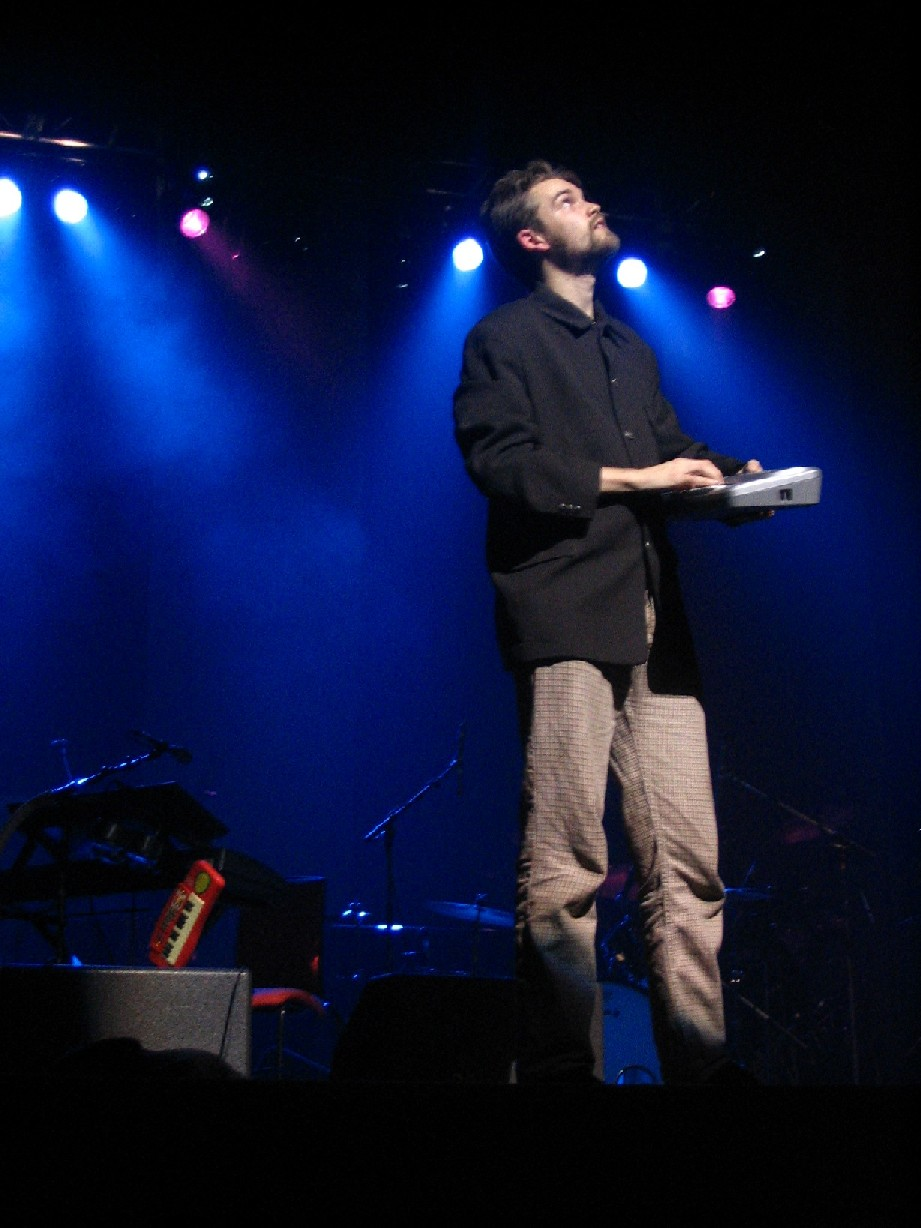
At a gig with the Guillemots in 2005.

Dangerfield composed a choral piece performed at The Lichfield Festival in 2000 – a setting of Christina Rossetti's "A Better Resurrection". This led to a commission from Ex Cathedra Chamber Choir to write a choral setting of one of the 'O Antiphons' for Ex Cathedra's Christmas Music by Candlelight concert in 2000. This has been performed many times since, was included on Ex Cathedra's Christmas Music by Candlelight CD which received some glowing reviews, and has been broadcast on BBC Radio 3 and Classic FM.

In 2002, Dangerfield was commissioned to write "A Stray Dog for Congratulations" – for three children's choirs, four percussionists, two pianists and keyboard – for The Lichfield Festival (the only commission that year). The performers included the Backbeat percussion ensemble, as well as the Sydney Children's choir.

In 2007, Dangerfield was commissioned by the John Feeney Charitable Trust to write a piece for the City of Birmingham Symphony Orchestra (CBSO) for one of the concerts that took place in October 2007 to celebrate the re-opening of Birmingham Town Hall. This was In Wait, a 30-minute orchestral composition, performed by cellist Eduardo Vassallo and the CBSO conducted by Nick Ingman. The second half of the concert was given by Guillemots accompanied by the CBSO.

In 2009, cellist Natalie Clein performed the world première of a new work by Dangerfield called "Eggshell Walker" at the Bridgewater Hall in Manchester. Dangerfield has since written two further works for Natalie Clein – "Pogo and the Cage" in 2010, and "Turquoise Black", which she premièred at the 2011 Bath Festival – a performance also broadcast on BBC Radio 3 in June 2011.

He composed music for the play, Howl's Moving Castle, based on the novel by Diana Wynne Jones, which was performed in London at Southwark Playhouse in the winter 2011 – 2012.

=== Other bands ===
Prior to Guillemots, Dangerfield played in Senseless Prayer (who played a radio session on the late John Peel's show), Fyfe Dangerfield and The Accident, and The Courtesy Group (the band of his brother, Al Hutchins) who have supported Guillemots several times on tour. Dangerfield contributes to the band's debut album, Tradesman's Entrance. Dangerfield contributed a cover of Larrikin Love's "Well, Love Does Furnish a Life" to their EP A Day in the Life. In late 2006, Fyfe released a very limited split vinyl single with his friends The Kittens, on which he contributed a demo of a solo song, "Delusia". This took place shortly before he played two solo shows (albeit, mostly consisting of solo renditions of Guillemots songs) in Birmingham and London, with support from Richard Burke, Emmy the Great, and Fyfe's older brother, Al.

In 2007 he sang "Lovers' Dream" with Anna Ternheim on her EP, Lovers Dream and More Music For Psychotic Lovers.

Dangerfield also leads an improvising group Gannets (sometimes written as gaNNets). The members are Dangerfield on keyboards, Alex Ward and Christopher Cundy clarinets, Dominic Lash double bass, and Steve Noble drums. The band appeared on BBC Radio 3's "Jazz on 3" in March 2008, and at the London Jazz Festival in November 2011, the latter session also being subsequently broadcast on BBC Radio 3. Gannets played a ten-date tour of England in January–February 2012.

=== Solo artist ===
Dangerfield released the album Fly Yellow Moon under his own name on 18 January 2010. The album's first track "When You Walk in the Room" was the single of the week on iTunes in the week starting 15 March 2010.

A TV commercial for the British chain store John Lewis, first broadcast in April 2010, features Dangerfield singing the Billy Joel song "She's Always a Woman".

In 2011, a portrait of Dangerfield was painted by British artist Joe Simpson, the painting was exhibited around the UK including a solo exhibition at The Royal Albert Hall.

In 2015, he produced on Slow Moving Millie's classical instrumental EP, Arms.

=== Channels May Change ===
On 21 September 2018, Dangerfield launched www.channelsmaychange.com - his new online channel, playground & home. One week later, on 28 September 2018, Dangerfield began broadcasting the series "Birdwatcher", a surreal mix of music, songs, sounds & characters, split into 12 weekly episodes, each put together in frantic real-time in the days ahead of transmission. The entirety of Birdwatcher is available to stream & download for free via the channel, along with accompanying "menus" for each Episode.

In 2021, "Woah! Life" (his first new single since Guillemots released "Fleet" in 2012) was issued by The state51 Conspiracy and was the first track from the "Birdwatcher" EP released in March.

In February 2023, Dangerfield released a new single and accompanying music video "Shook" via his Channels May Change website. In April 2023, Dangerfield released another new single and music video entitled "The Zebra Wind".

==== The Stream ====
In November 2025 Dangerfield launched 'The Stream' on Channels May Change. 'The Stream' is a randomly generated playlist which resets every 24 hours, playing music, drafts, and sketches - much of which has not been released in traditional formats - from Dangerfield's personal back catalogue. As of August 2026 'The Stream' contains over 148 hours of music.

=== TV appearances ===
On 14 February 2007, Dangerfield made an appearance on episode 20x03 of Never Mind the Buzzcocks (when Preston of The Ordinary Boys walked off the show), on Bill Bailey's team. On 21 June 2011, he performed on episode 07x11 of the Graham Norton Show. On 11 June 2015 he was a guest on BBC's Springwatch Unsprung, earning high praise from Chris Packham for his photograph taken on the RSPB Minsmere reserve, and performing "We're Here".

== Discography ==
=== Albums ===
Year	Album details	Peak chart positions	
Year	Album details	UK	SCO
2010	Fly Yellow Moon: Released: 18 January 2010; Label: Polydor Records; Formats: CD, digital download	12	14

=== Singles ===
Year	Song	Chart positions				Album
Year	Song	UK	EU	MEX	SCO	Album
2010	"She Needs Me"	152	—	—	—	Fly Yellow Moon
2010	"When You Walk in the Room"	—	—	50	—	Fly Yellow Moon
2010	"Faster Than the Setting Sun"	—	—	—	—	Fly Yellow Moon
2010	"She's Always a Woman"	7	11	—	8	Fly Yellow Moon
2010	"Barricades"	—	—	—	—	Fly Yellow Moon
"—" denotes a recording that did not chart or was not released in that territory.
