= Noisettes discography =

Discography of British band Noisettes

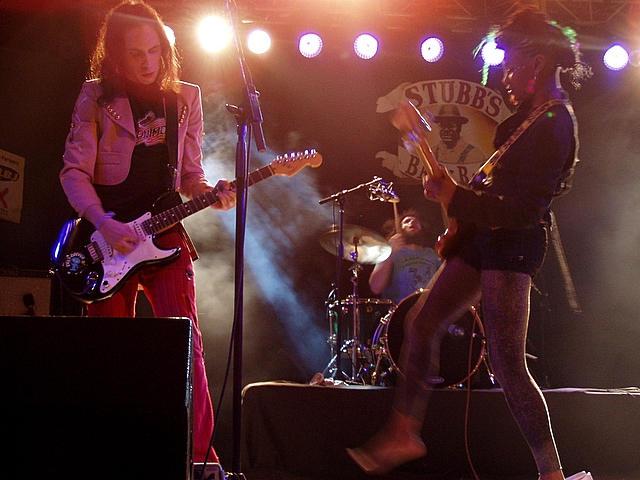
- Dan Smith, James Morrison and Shingai Shoniwa of Noisettes performing in 2006
- Studio albums: 3
- Extended plays: 3
- Live albums: 1
- Singles: 10
- Music videos: 11
- Contributive singles: 1
- Other appearances: 3

Noisettes, a British band based in London, have released three studio albums, ten singles, three extended plays (EPs) and eleven music videos. They have also been credited as featured artists in one single, as well as making appearances on other albums. Predominantly an indie rock band, Noisettes' music incorporates other styles of musical genres, including rock and post-punk revival.

Founded in 2003 by lead singer and bassist Shingai Shoniwa, guitarist Dan Smith, (both from band Sonarfly), and drummer James Morrison. Under the name "NOISEttes", the three recorded their first release, a four-song EP entitled Three Moods of the Noisettes, issued by Side Salad Records in 2005. In 2007, Noisettes released their debut album, What's the Time Mr Wolf? on label Vertigo Records. Described as garage-rock and compared to work by Green Day, the album peaked at number 75 on the UK Albums Chart despite positive critical reception and heavy promotion.

The Noisettes are most well known for their 2009 single release "Don't Upset the Rhythm (Go Baby Go)", which debuted and reached a peak of number two on the UK Singles Chart, and was their first single to chart outside the UK. Following the successful release of "Go Baby Go", the Noisettes released their second studio album, Wild Young Hearts on 20 April 2009. The album saw the Noisettes move from mainstream styles to other genres such as "jazz fusion"-influenced pop and "hard-edged indie rock". Wild Young Hearts achieved number seven on the UK Albums Chart, as well as managing to chart in other European countries. The band released the first single from their third album Contact, titled "Winner" on 9 July 2012.

== Albums ==
=== Studio albums ===
Title	Album details	Peak chart positions								Certifications
Title	Album details	UK	AUT	BEL (Fla)	IRL	FRA	SCO	SWI	US	Certifications
What's the Time Mr Wolf?	Released: 5 February 2007; Label: Vertigo; Formats: CD, digital download	75	—	—	—	—	—	—	—	
Wild Young Hearts	Released: 20 April 2009; Label: Vertigo/Mercury; Formats: CD, LP, digital download	7	71	60	31	126	7	86	98	BPI: Gold
Contact	Released: 27 August 2012; Label: MONO-RA-RAMA; Formats: CD, digital download	30	—	—	—	—	35	—	—	
"—" denotes album that did not chart or was not released

=== Extended plays ===
Title	EP details	Notes
Three Moods of the Noisettes	Released: 11 April 2005; Label: [Side Salad Records (UK) / [Universal Records|Low Altitude] (US)]; Format: CD	Charted in the UK at #191
What's the Time Mini-Wolf?	Released: 26 December 2006; Label: Universal; Format: Digital download	Released exclusively to the iTunes Store.
London Festival '09	Released: 16 November 2010; Label: Island; Format: Digital download	Released exclusively to the iTunes Store, as part of the iTunes Live series.

== Singles ==
=== As lead artists ===
Year	Title	Peak chart positions					Certifications	Album
Year	Title	UK	BEL (Vl)	IRL	NLD	SWI	Certifications	Album
2006	"IWE"	—	—	—	—	—		What's the Time Mr Wolf?
2006	"Scratch Your Name"	147	—	—	—	—		What's the Time Mr Wolf?
2006	"Don't Give Up"	73	—	—	—	—		What's the Time Mr Wolf?
2007	"Sister Rosetta (Capture the Spirit)"	63	—	—	—	—		What's the Time Mr Wolf?
2007	"The Count of Monte Christo"	—	—	—	—	—		What's the Time Mr Wolf?
2008	"Wild Young Hearts"	91	—	—	—	—		Wild Young Hearts
2009	"Don't Upset the Rhythm (Go Baby Go)"	2	54	8	75	79	BPI: Silver	Wild Young Hearts
2009	"Never Forget You"	20	25	24	—	73	BPI: Platinum	Wild Young Hearts
2012	"That Girl" / "Winner"	87	92	—	—	—		Contact
2012	"I Want You Back"	—	—	—	—	—		Contact
"—" denotes that the release did not chart or was not released.

=== As featured artists ===
Year	Title	Peak chart positions		Album
Year	Title	UK	IRE	Album
2006	"Janie Jones (Strummerville)" ^{[note A]} (with Babyshambles and Friends)	17	45	"Janie Jones" – single

=== Other charted songs ===
Year	Title	Peak chart positions	Album
Year	Title	BEL (Vl)	Album
2009	"Every Now and Then"	55	Wild Young Hearts

Notes

- A Charity single, listed as "contributors" to the song.

== Music videos ==
Year	Video	Director(s)
2006	"IWE"	Danny Parsons
2006	"Scratch Your Name"	Sarah Chatfield
2006	"Don't Give Up"	Ollie Evans
2007	"Sister Rosetta (Capture the Spirit)"	Ollie Evans
2007	"The Count of Monte Christo"	Paul Gore
2008	"Wild Young Hearts" ^{[note B]}	None
2009	"Don't Upset the Rhythm (Go Baby Go)" (version one)	Vertex
2009	"Don't Upset the Rhythm (Go Baby Go)" (version two)	Kinga Burza
2009	"Never Forget You"	Paul Gore
2009	"Saturday Night" ^{[note C]}	Kim Gehrig and fans
2009	"Every Now and Then"	
2010	"Ever Fallen In Love"	Rankin & Chris

Notes

- B The music video for "Wild Young Hearts" was made up of footage of a Noisettes performance at the Proud Gallery in Camden, London.
- C The music video for "Saturday Night" was made up of recordings by fans using only Nokia mobile devices, at an exclusive live performance in East London. The video was recorded for "Shot By Fans", to which it was made available for them to create their own versions online.

== Other appearances ==
The following have been officially released, but do not feature on any recordings by Noisettes:

Year	Song	Album appearance	Album artist	Notes
2006	"The Boy Who Ran Away" (Noisettes Pic 'n' Mix Lobotomy Mix)	"The Boy Who Ran Away, Pt.2" – single	Mystery Jets	Listed as remixers.
2007	"Shame"	LoveMusicHateRacism (CD2)	Various artists	Appearance on charity CD, released free inside New Musical Express.
2009	"When You Were Young" (Live)	Radio 1's Live Lounge – Volume 4	Various artists	Live cover of American band The Killers song for BBC Radio 1.
2009	"Mon Petit Á Petit" (with Olivia Ruiz)	Miss Météores	Olivia Ruiz	Featured artists.
2009	"Io Bacio... Tu Baci"	Nine film soundtrack	Various artists	Produced for film soundtrack.

== See also ==
- List of songs recorded by Noisettes
