= List of songs recorded by Noisettes =

This is a list of songs by the band Noisettes, and what albums and singles they were released on.

Name	Three Moods of the Noisettes	What's The Time Mini-Wolf?	What's The Time Mr. Wolf?	What's The Time Mr. Wolf? (Japanese version)	Wild Young Hearts	singles
"Don't Give Up"	X	X	X	X		
"Monte Christo"	X					
"Signs"	X					
"Burn"	X					
"A Little Destruction "		X				
"Speedhorn"		X		X		
"Count of Monte Cristo"		X	X	X		
"Mind the Gap"		X	X	X		
"What Kind Of Model"				X		
"Wind Blows Hot" 3:38						Scratch Your Name
"Rifle Song" 3:56						Scratch Your Name
For All We Know						Don't Give Up (Noisettes song)
Horses						Sister Rosetta (Capture the Spirit)
Shame						Sister Rosetta (Capture the Spirit)
