= Loft Music =

Studio album by Thea Gilmore
- Released: June 2004
- Venue: The Loft; Liverpool, England
- Producer: Nigel Stonier; Mike Cave

Thea Gilmore chronology
| Avalanche (2003) | Loft Music (2004) | Harpo's Ghost (2006) |

Loft Music is an album by the English singer-songwriter by Thea Gilmore, released in June 2004. It is an album of cover versions of other artists' songs, chosen from suggestions sent in by fans. Gilmore described Loft Music as an addendum to her 2003 album Avalanche. She called it a "this is where I came in" piece, recorded in homage to the writers and performers whose spirit stood with her during the album's execution.

== Background and recording ==
The album was recorded at The Loft, Liverpool – hence the title – and was co-produced by Nigel Stonier and Mike Cave.

== Reception ==
Pop Matters gave the album an 8 out of 10 score, praising her takes on the songs as so good that "...you start to wonder why the original performers didn't do it her way in the first place."

== Track listing ==
| No. | Title | Writer(s) | Length |
|---|---|---|---|
| 1. | "Ever Fallen in Love (With Someone You Shouldn't've)" | Pete Shelley | 3:11 |
| 2. | "Hide 'N' Seeking" | Paul Westerberg | 3:41 |
| 3. | "Bad Moon Rising" | John Fogerty | 3:06 |
| 4. | "Don't Come Close" | Dee Dee Ramone/Johnny Ramone/Joey Ramone | 2:20 |
| 5. | "The Old Laughing Lady" | Neil Young | 4:17 |
| 6. | "Crazy Love" | Van Morrison | 2:58 |
| 7. | "Sitting In Limbo" | Jimmy Cliff/Plummer Guillermo | 3:50 |
| 8. | "Josef's Train" | Nigel Stonier | 3:17 |
| 9. | "Brother, Can You Spare a Dime?" | Jay Gorney/E. Y. "Yip" Harburg | 2:36 |
| 10. | "When I'm Gone" | Phil Ochs | 3:40 |

== Personnel ==
- Thea Gilmore - vocals
- Nigel Stonier - all other instruments
- Mike Cave
- Jim Kirkpatrick - National Steel on 7
