= Harpo's Ghost =

Studio album by Thea Gilmore
- Released: 21 August 2006
- Recorded: Riverside Studios, Somerset; The Chapel, Lincolnshire; Westside, London
- Genre: Rock, folk
- Length: 49:25
- Label: Sanctuary
- Producer: Nigel Stonier

Thea Gilmore chronology
Loft Music (2004)	Harpo's Ghost (2006)	Liejacker (2008)

Professional ratings
Review scores
Source	Rating
AllMusic	4/5 stars
The Guardian	3/5 stars
Hot Press	7.5/10
musicOMH	3/5 stars
PopMatters	8/10 stars
The Skinny	4/5 stars
Slant Magazine	3/5 stars
Uncut	4/5 stars

Harpo's Ghost is the seventh album by English singer-songwriter Thea Gilmore. It was released in August 2006 on Sanctuary Records. The album peaked at number 69 on the UK Albums Chart.

== Track listing ==
All songs written by Thea Gilmore, except where noted.

1. "The Gambler" – 4:28
2. "Everybody's Numb" – 3:46
3. "Red White and Black" – 4:12
4. "Call Me Your Darling" – 3:41
5. "We Built a Monster" (Thea Gilmore, Mike Scott) – 3:21
6. "The List" – 4:06
7. "Going Down" – 3:10
8. "Whistle and Steam" (Thea Gilmore, Mike Scott, Nigel Stonier) – 4:07
9. "Cheap Tricks" – 3:39
10. "Contessa" – 4:57
11. "Slow Journey II"/"Play Until the Bottle's Gone" (Stonier) – 9:38

== Personnel ==
- Thea Gilmore – vocals, whistling, acoustic guitar, backing vocals
- Nigel Stonier – acoustic guitar, electric guitar, dulcimer, ukulele, harmonica, harmonium, organ, Wurlitzer organ, backing vocals
- Dave Hull-Denholm – acoustic guitar, backing vocals
- Eric Ambel – electric guitar, harmonium
- Steve Evans – electric guitar, Wurlitzer organ
- Ewan Davies – E-bow, programming
- Laura Reid – cello
- Paul Beavis – drums
- John Tonks – percussion
- Kathryn Williams – backing vocals
