= Songs from the Gutter =

Studio album by Thea Gilmore
- Released: 2002
- Genre: Rock, folk
- Length: 80:31
- Label: Shameless/Flying Sparks/Hot
- Producer: Nigel Stonier

Thea Gilmore chronology
Rules For Jokers (2001)	Songs from the Gutter (2002)	Avalanche (2003)

Songs from the Gutter is the fourth studio album by English singer-songwriter Thea Gilmore. It was released in 2002 on her own label, Shameless, in association with Flying Sparks and Hot Records. The album included a bonus disc containing material that was previously available only through online distribution.

== Track listing ==
All songs written by Thea Gilmore, except where noted.

1. "Down To Nowhere" – 3:53
2. "When Did You Get So Safe?" – 3:24
3. "Tear It All Down" (The Gilmore/Nigel Stonier) – 4:06
4. "The Dirt Is Your Lover Now" – 4:30
5. "I Dreamed I Saw St Augustine" (Bob Dylan) – 4:43
6. "Lip Reading" – 3:34
7. "Heart String Blues" – 4:22
8. "Mud On My Shoes" – 3:29
9. "Water To Sky" – 2:41
10. "And We'll Dance" – 4:01

Bonus disc

1. "Cover Me" (Bruce Springsteen) – 3:37
2. "I'm Not Down" (Strummer/Jones/Simonon/Headon) – 2:59
3. "Hydrogen" (1996) – 3:32
4. "Beelzebub" (1996) – 4:07
5. "Maybe" (1996) – 3:56
6. "Red Farm" (1997) – 3:56
7. "Brittle Dreams" (1996) – 3:47
8. "December In New York" (1997) – 3:38
9. "Gun Cotton" (1999) – 4:14
10. "Don't Set Foot Over The Railway Track" (2000) – 2:27
11. "Lavender Cowgirl" (2000) – 2:57
12. "You Tell Me" (2001) – 3:37
13. "Straight Lines" (2001) – 5:33

== Reception ==
Professional ratings
Review scores
Source	Rating
Allmusic	4/5 stars

Allmusic's Rick Anderson gave the album four stars, calling it "essential". Billboard called her vision on the album "dark, cold, yet rapturous".

== Personnel ==
- Thea Gilmore - vocals
- Nigel Stonier - guitar, keyboards
- Paul Beavis - drums
- Robbie McIntosh - guitar
