= Rules for Jokers =

2001 album by Thea Gilmore

Studio album by Thea Gilmore
- Released: 2001
- Studio: Chapel Studios
- Producer: Nigel Stonier

Thea Gilmore chronology
The Lipstick Conspiracies (2000)	Rules for Jokers (2001)	Songs from the Gutter (2002)

Rules For Jokers is the third album by the English singer-songwriter Thea Gilmore, released in 2001.

It was recorded at Chapel Studios in Lincolnshire and produced by Nigel Stonier. The album was a breakthrough for Gilmore with the songs "Holding Your Hand" and "Saviours And All" receiving substantial airplay on BBC Radio 2. The song "Inverigo" was written in Italy, in the town of Inverigo, in honour of Bob Dylan.

== Reception ==
The album received positive reviews from AllMusic and Exclaim!.

== Track listing ==
All tracks are written by Thea Gilmore

No.	Title	Length
1.	"Apparition No. 12"	2:44
2.	"Holding Your Hand"	3:45
3.	"This Girl Is Taking Bets"	3:31
4.	"Saviours And All"	3:41
5.	"St. Luke's Summer"	3:44
6.	"The Things We Never Said"	4:52
7.	"Seen It All Before"	4:13
8.	"Benzedrine"	3:01
9.	"Movie Kisses"	3:23
10.	"Take Me Home"	3:14
11.	"Keep Up"	2:43
12.	"Saying Nothing"	3:21
13.	"Inverigo"	4:14

== Personnel ==
- Thea Gilmore - vocals, acoustic guitar, electric guitar, piano, kalimba, cimbala, mbira
- Nigel Stonier - electric guitars, acoustic guitars, bass guitar, piano, organ, harmonica, voice
- Robbie McIntosh - electric guitars, acoustic guitars, voice
- Ian Thomas - drums, percussion, griddle pan (5)
- Oliver Kraus - cello
- David Coulter - saw, tenor banjo, Q-chord, slide didgeridoo, jaw harp, accordion
- Dave 'Munch' Moore - organ (12), harpsichord
- Ewan Davies - percussion, organ (10), Blue Tube, finger cymbals, voice
- Freyja Gilmore - voice (8,10,12)
- Will Bartle - voice, cymbal (5)
- Sarah Jane Morris - voice (11)
- Steve Menzies - voice (11)
