= Burning Dorothy =

Studio album by Thea Gilmore
- Released: November 1998
- Genre: Rock, folk
- Length: 45:22
- Label: Shameless
- Producer: Nigel Stonier, Mark Tucker

Thea Gilmore chronology
Burning Dorothy (1998)	The Lipstick Conspiracies (2000)

Burning Dorothy is the first album by the English singer-songwriter Thea Gilmore. It was released in November 1998 when she was 18, after she was discovered while doing work experience at Woodworm Studios.

== Reception ==
A review in Mojo said, "...there's plenty of feisty attitude, barbed one-liners, edgy rock arrangements and hollering affirmations of strident independence. ‘Pontiac to Homegirl’ reveals a writer of intriguing mystique and depth, while Militia Sister (‘Just because I bleed seems to make me family, I don't wanna be your militia sister’) is an oddly moving statement of post-feminist intent. And ‘Bad Ideas’, both funny and potent, is so good it's scary...(There is a) freedom of spirit, remorselessly fierce air of truth and bold range of emotions and musical explosions..."

== Track listing ==
All songs written by Thea Gilmore.

1. "Sugar" – 3:39
2. "Get Out" – 3:17
3. "People Like You" – 3:19
4. "Pontiac to Home Girl" – 4:32
5. "Not so Clever Now" – 3:41
6. "Instead of the Saints" – 3:36
7. "Militia Sister" – 3:18
8. "Throwing In" – 3:44
9. "Bad Idea" – 4:14
10. "Into the Blue" – 12:02

"Into the Blue" plays about 3:57 minutes, but contains a hidden bonus track called "One Last Fight", starting after five minutes of silence at about 8:56 minutes.

== Personnel ==
- Thea Gilmore – vocals, acoustic guitar
- Nigel Stonier – Record producer, programming, electric guitar, acoustic guitar, bass guitar, keyboards, mandolin, backing vocals
- Mark Tucker – engineer (with exception of track 9), electric guitar, darabuka
- Paul Burgess – drums, percussion
- Jim Bennion – electric guitar (on tracks 2 and 4)
- Mark Walker – engineer on track 9
