= Mike Cave =

British musician

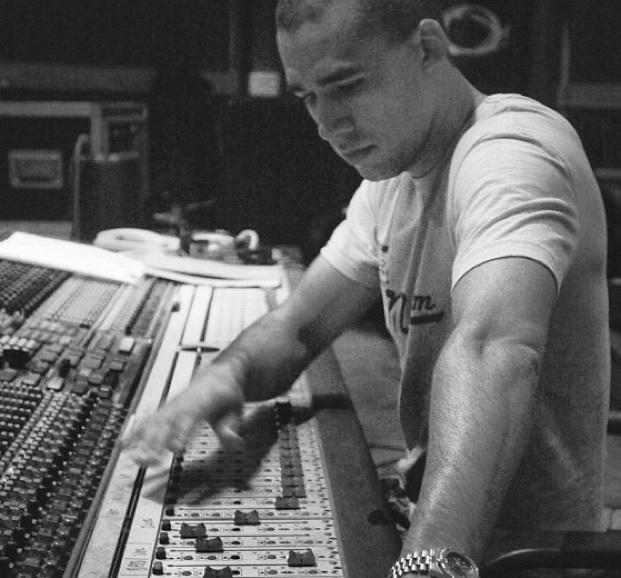
- Cave in the studio
- Born: Michael Cave; 1 January 1978 (age 48); Liverpool, United Kingdom
- Occupations: Music producer, mix engineer, musician
- Website: mikecave.co.uk

Mike Cave (born Michael Cave on 1 January 1978) is a British musician, record producer and mix engineer, whose clients have included The Noisettes, Professor Green, Tinchy Stryder, Elvis Costello, The Charlatans and The Coral.

== Early life ==
Cave was born in Liverpool. On his 8th birthday he received his first guitar from his father. He later proceeded to play in a variety of bands on the Liverpool circuit from the age of 12, and by 15 he was engineering sessions for his own bands and others in the area. Cave grew up in the Anfield area of the city where he met members of his band The Sunlites. This led to a professional career in the music industry firstly as a musician before moving on to studio engineering, production and mixing.

== Music career ==
=== The Sunlites and Mercury records ===
In 1995 Cave's band the Sunlites signed a deal with Mercury. The record was finished, but never released, however the 2 years in the studio helped to introduce Cave to some highly regarded producers, including Kevin Bacon, and Jonathan Quarmby.

=== Parr Street Studios ===
In 1997, and after the band split up, Cave started working as an in-house engineer at Parr Street Studios in Liverpool, where he worked alongside Ken Nelson, Jeremy Wheatley (Space, Sugababes, Mel C), and Brendan Lynch.

=== The Loft ===
In 2002 Cave opened his own studio, moving into a converted Manhattan-style loft in central Liverpool, which he named The Loft Studios.

== Selected discography ==
=== Singles ===
- Tinchy Stryder – "Oh No" (2011)
- The Zutons – "Tower of Strength" (2009)
- Elvis Costello – "Don't Throw Your Love Away" (2009)

=== Albums ===
- The Noisettes – "Contact" (2012)
- James Vincent McMorrow – "Early in The Morning" (2011)
- Bob Dylan – "Chimes of Freedom: Songs of Bob Dylan Honoring 50 Years of Amnesty International" (2011)
- John Martyn – "On the Cobbles"
- The Charlatans – "Up at the Lake" (2005)
- BodyRockers – BodyRockers (2005)
- The Coral – "Calendars & Clocks" (EP, 2004)
