= Avalanche (Thea Gilmore album) =

Studio album by Thea Gilmore
- Released: 9 September 2003
- Studios: The Forge, Oswestry; The Loft, Liverpool; Chapel Studios, South Thoresby, Lincs
- Genres: Rock, folk
- Length: 46:46
- Label: Hungry Dog
- Producer: Nigel Stonier

Thea Gilmore chronology
Songs From The Gutter (2002)	Avalanche (2003)	Loft Music (2003)

Avalanche is the fifth album by the English singer-songwriter Thea Gilmore. It was released on 9 September 2003 on the Hungry Dog record label. The album peaked at number 63 on the UK Albums Chart. Uncut magazine ranked Avalanche at number 59 of its "Albums of the Year" for 2003 and said of Gilmore: "You can hear her growing in stature with every record she makes."

== Track listing ==
All songs written by Thea Gilmore, except where noted.

1. "Rags and Bones" – 3:38
2. "Have You Heard" – 3:26
3. "Juliet (Keep That in Mind)" – 3:52
4. "Avalanche" – 4:21
5. "Mainstream" (Gilmore, Nigel Stonier) – 3:12
6. "Pirate Moon" – 4:20
7. "Apparition #13" – 3:27
8. "Razor Valentine" – 3:46
9. "God Knows" – 3:49
10. "Heads Will Roll" – 2:33
11. "Eight Months" – 5:33
12. "The Cracks" – 4:49

== Reception ==
Professional ratings
Review scores
Source	Rating
AllMusic	4/5 stars
The Guardian	4/5 stars
The Independent	(favourable)
Mojo	4/5 stars
musicOMH	(highly favourable)
No Depression	(mixed)
Q	4/5 stars
The Sunday Times	(favourable)
Time Out	4/5 stars

The Independent considered the album to be Gilmore taking "the final step to the forefront of British singer-songwriters, with 12 songs that establish her as the most prolific and intelligent wordsmith of her generation". AllMusic's Hal Horowitz gave it four stars, stating the album saw her "moving a bit closer to the mainstream", also calling the songs "some of her best". Adam Sweeting, for The Guardian, also gave it four stars, writing that it saw her "blazing her own path towards classic status as a songwriter". Billboard's Steve Adams called it "an astonishingly literate collection of songs that marks another career leap".

== Personnel ==
- Thea Gilmore – vocals, acoustic guitar, electric guitar, piano, xylophone, melodica, saw
- Nigel Stonier – producer, programming, electric guitar, acoustic guitar, gut string guitar, bass guitar, keyboards, Moog, Wurlitzer, Rhodes, backing vocals
- Robbie McIntosh – electric guitar, National guitar, backing vocals
- Paul Beavis – drums, percussion
- Jo Wadeson – bass guitar
- Dave "Munch" Moore – Hammond organ
- Mike Cave – drums, programming, cymbal
- Dylan Gallagher – programming
- Dave Hull-Denholm – backing vocals
- Freyja Gilmore – backing vocals
- Oliver Kraus – cello
- Ewan Davies – musical box
