= Tunepics (app) =

Social networking service

Tunepics was a social networking service that let users share their own photos combined with a suitable soundtrack. The user could choose a photo to upload, and select from a range of filters and other tools to choose from to edit the photo. Thereafter the user had the possibility to choose a soundtrack that was played when the photo was shown. The purpose of combining the photos with music was to let the sound and image complement each other, to bring out something new from the photo and make it possible for the users to express themselves in a different way than in other social network applications. The music available came from the Apple store and was an about 30 seconds long preview of the track.

When a photo was shared on Tunepics other users were able to like, retune (share), comment and spin the emotion wheel to select the emotion they think the photo is expressing. The emotion wheel consists of 16 rainbow-colored dots that represent the emotions love, hot, laughing, happy, moved, excited, jealous, singing, inspired, crying, dreaming, cool, sad, beautiful, heartbroken and dancing (which replaced 'lucky'). These reactions from other users are shown as a kind of feedback on what they experienced from the uploaded picture and soundtrack.

== History ==
The iOS application was created in 2014 by London-based Justin Cooke, the founder of innovation agency innovate7, who earlier worked as the marketing chief of Topshop and as a vice president of Burberry. It rose to popularity primarily in the United Kingdom, due to the large influx of British celebrities downloading the app in its early stage including Adele, The Beckhams, Charli XCX, Paul Smith, Ricky Gervais, Ella Henderson, and James Vincent McMorrow, eventually leading to the peak userbase of 8 million users globally, including international stars such as Will.i.am, Lorde, and Kate Bosworth. The app was shut down in 2016 with the reason cited being that "the reality was the long-term costs exceeded the likely growth potential".

== Tools ==
Like in many other social network sites Tunepics used hashtags to help make the spreading of the photos wider. The users were also able to tag other users in their uploads, as well as tag where the photo was taken. If people liked a soundtrack to an image they could push the button "buy on iTunes" and get redirected to the iTunes store.

The photo-editing options in Tunepics were a brightness and contrast-adjustor, ten different filters, four different pattern-filters and a crop/tilt-adjustor.

== See also ==
- Instagram
- Facebook
- Twitter
- Vine
