= Liejacker =

Studio album by Thea Gilmore
- Released: 19 May 2008
- Studio: The Loft, Liverpool
- Label: Fullfill
- Producer: Thea Gilmore, Nigel Stonier, Mike Cave

Thea Gilmore chronology
Harpo's Ghost (2006)	Liejacker (2008)	Recorded Delivery (2009)

Liejacker is an album by the English singer-songwriter Thea Gilmore, released in May 2008. For the first time, Gilmore duets with other singers. "Old Soul" (also released as a single) features Zutons' frontman Dave McCabe, while Joan Baez (who invited Gilmore to tour with her in 2004) assists on "The Lower Road".

The album was recorded primarily at The Loft, Liverpool, and produced by Gilmore, Nigel Stonier and Mike Cave. Gilmore described it as her most personal album to date. Liejacker was released in the US four months after its UK release, with two tracks omitted and a revised running order.

== Track listing ==
All tracks are written by Thea Gilmore, except where noted.

No.	Title	Writer(s)	Length
1.	"Old Soul"		3:55
2.	"Black Letter"		3:11
3.	"Dance In New York"		6:54
4.	"Rosie"		4:33
5.	"Roll On"		5:27
6.	"Icarus Wind"		4:10
7.	"The Wrong Side"		3:16
8.	"Slow Journey"		2:39
9.	"And You Shall Know No Other God But Me"		4:24
10.	"When I Get Back To Shore"		2:03
11.	"Breathe"		4:17
12.	"The Lower Road"		5:15
13.	"You Spin Me Round (Like A Record)"	Pete Burns, Wayne Hussey, Mike Percy, Tim Lever, Steve Coy	3:51

== Reception ==
Stephanie Merritt, for The Observer, gave the album the full five stars, describing it as "simply a beautiful, deeply affecting piece of work". Nick Coleman, reviewing the album for The Independent, described it as a "Good record, lovable in parts.". Allmusic reviewer Hal Horowitz gave it fours stars, describing it as "one of Gilmore's least commercially oriented albums yet, and perhaps because of that, also one of her finest". the PopMatters writer Steve Horowitz wrote that the album proved "that the 28-year-old Gilmore is a seriously talented writer and performer". Gigwise.com gave it 9 stars (out of 11), Daniel Melia describing it as "her most intimate and deeply personal record". The BBC's Chris Long was less impressed, considering the songs over-produced and Gilmore's songwriting "losing its energy and passion, as if she has a slow puncture in her soul".

== Personnel ==
- Thea Gilmore - vocals
- Nigel Stonier
- Mike Cave
- Roy Martin
- Laura Reid
- Ian Thomson
- James Hallawell
- John Kirkpatrick
- Jo Wadeson
- Jordan Oldfield
- Kelly Rogerson
- Joan Baez - vocals on 12
- Dave McCabe - vocals on 1
- Erin McKeown
- Steve Wickham
