= XXXV (album) =

Studio album by Fairport Convention
- Released: 12 February 2002
- Recorded: 2002
- Genre: British folk rock
- Label: Woodworm

Fairport Convention chronology
| The Wood and the Wire (1999) | XXXV (2002) | Over the Next Hill (2004) |

Professional ratings
Review scores
| Source | Rating |
|---|---|
| Allmusic | 3/5 stars |

XXXV is a 2002 album by Fairport Convention. It is subtitled "The 35th Anniversary Album", and was released in celebration of the band's existence from 1967–2002. It is their 30th album release since their debut, Fairport Convention, in 1968.

== Track listing ==
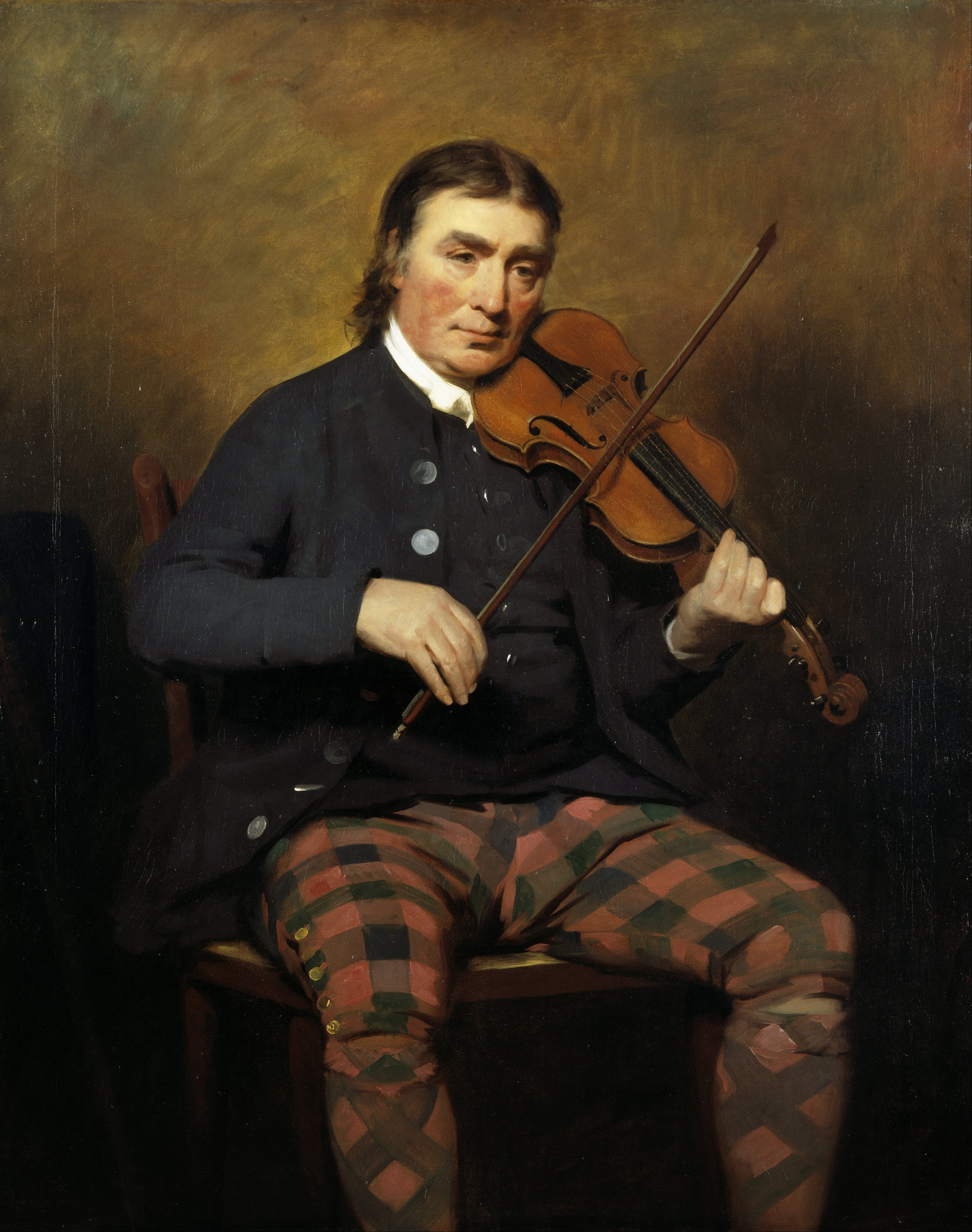
Niel Gow (1727–1807)

1. "Madeleine" (Laurence Bristow-Smith, Kenny Craddock) - 4:23
2. "My Love Is in America" (Chris Leslie) - 4:43
3. "The Happy Man" (Traditional; arrangement by Chris Leslie) - 2:48
4. "Portmeirion" (Ric Sanders) - 5:56
5. "The Crowd" (Anna Ryder) - 6:09
6. "The Banks of Sweet Primroses" (Traditional; arrangement Simon Nicol, Dave Pegg, Ric Sanders, Chris Leslie, Gerry Conway) - 4:27
7. "The Deserter" (John Richards) - 6:55
8. "The Light of Day" (Chris Leslie) - 6:11
9. "I Wandered by a Brookside" (music: Barbara Berry/words: Traditional, from the Alfred Williams Collection, Swindon Library) - 4:52
10. "Neil Gow's Apprentice" (Michael Marra) - 4:43
11. "Everything but the Skirl" (Ric Sanders) - 4:05
12. "Talking About My Love" (Chris Leslie, Nigel Stonier) - 2:40
13. "Now Be Thankful" (Richard Thompson, Dave Swarbrick) - 3:45
14. "The Crowd Revisited" (Anna Ryder) - 2:35

== Personnel ==
- Simon Nicol – guitar, vocals
- Chris Leslie – mandolin, violin, vocals, tenor banjo, electronic mandolin
- Ric Sanders – violin, electric piano, baritone violin
- Dave Pegg – bass guitar, vocals
- Gerry Conway – percussion, drums

Additional personnel

- Ian Anderson – flute
- Cropredy Crowd – clapping
- Chris Knibbs – trombone
- Julie Matthews – vocals
- Chas McDevitt – trumpet
- Anna Ryder – piano, accordion, french horn, vocals, penny whistle
- Mark Tucker – electric guitar, e-bow
- Chris While – vocals

Production personnel

- Mark Tucker – producer, engineer, mixing
- John Dent – mastering
- Colin Edwards – photography
- Dave Pegg – producer
- Mick Toole – CD art adaptation, cover photo

== Release history ==
- 2002 : Woodworm Records CD, WRCD038
- 2002 : Compass Records CD, 4332
- 2007 : Eagle Rock Records CD, 350

== See also ==
- Niel Gow's Oak – inspiration for the song "Neil Gow's Apprentice"
