= Go Baby Go =

Go Baby Go may refer to:

- "Cherry Lips," also known as "Cherry Lips (Go Baby Go!)," a 2001 song by alternative rock group Garbage
- "Don't Upset the Rhythm (Go Baby Go)," a 2009 song by the British band Noisettes
