= Post Tropical =

Studio album by James Vincent McMorrow
- Released: 10 January 2014
- Recorded: Sonic Ranch; Tornillo, Texas. 2013
- Length: 40:51
- Labels: Believe Recordings, EMI (Europe), Vagrant Records (US),

James Vincent McMorrow chronology
Early in the Morning (2010)	Post Tropical (2014)	We Move (2016)

Singles from Post Tropical
- 1. "Cavalier" Released: 2014

Post Tropical is the second full-length album by the Irish singer-songwriter James Vincent McMorrow. It marks a move away from the largely acoustic indie folk of his 2010 debut Early in the Morning, towards a more soulful direction, and the inclusion of electronic instruments such as a Roland TR-808, brass and strings, combined with hip-hop beats and 1960s soul influences. The album was preceded in October 2013 by the single and album opening track "Cavalier". The single's video was directed by Irish director Aoife McArdle, one of three short films she made for the album.

Asked about the dramatic change in direction, McMorrow admitted that he consciously sought to move away from the sound of his debut, and had no interest in repeating himself. He believes that musicians have a responsibility "to make new and interesting things. And not just go, 'Well that works, so I'm just gonna...'"

The song "Glacier" was included in a Spanish Christmas Lottery ('El Gordo') advert, aired in November 2014, in which someone who hadn't bought a lottery ticket from the bar he always went to, tears up when the barman charges him with 21 euros; "1 for the coffee and 20 for this lottery ticket".

== Recording ==
The album was recorded in 2013 in the small desert town of Tornillo, 55 miles south of El Paso in Texas. The studio is located on a pecan farm, and McMorrow found the location "the most surreal place to work", and one that helped add to the tone of the album and inspire his creativity. He said "I think it's kind of engrained in the record, more than any pinpointed thing. I can hear the hot bedded air in this part. You can hear the birds in the pianos."

== Critical reception ==
Professional ratings
Aggregate scores
Source	Rating
Metacritic	78/100
Review scores
Source	Rating
AllMusic	4/5 stars
Alternative Press	4/5 stars
Metro	3/5 stars
Pitchfork	7.1/10
Spin	8/10

Post Tropical has been met with generally positive reviews. At Alternative Press, Mischa Pearlman rated the album four stars, writing that "his half-raspy, half-angelic vocals repeat in icy desperation", and this "makes you want to freeze to death." In addition, Pearlman noting that on the album he "demonstrates both his versatility and magnificence by wrapping his voice around 10 delicate but different songs." On January 10, Tony Clayton-Lea of The Irish Times described "McMorrow's falsetto voice, which is used to such good effect that you're sometimes left almost breathless" and wondered if it marked "an album of the Year so early into 2014". Writing in The Guardian, Harriet Gibsone describes an "incredibly beautiful record...woozy Americana", and a sound "so sweetly sentimental it makes Alt-J sound like NWA".

A number of critics have drawn comparisons with the experimentation of James Blake and Bon Iver's second album.

== Commercial performance ==
In the United States, the album debuted at No. 76 on Billboard 200, and No. 20 on Top Rock Albums for charts dated February 1, 2014, selling 5,000 copies in the first week. The album had sold 18,000 copies in the US as of August 2016.

== Track listing ==
All tracks are written by James Vincent McMorrow.

Post Tropical
No.	Title	Length
1.	"Cavalier"	4:43
2.	"The Lakes"	4:07
3.	"Red Dust"	4:01
4.	"Gold"	3:00
5.	"All Points"	3:43
6.	"Look Out"	3:26
7.	"Repeating"	4:38
8.	"Post Tropical"	4:33
9.	"Glacier"	4:09
10.	"Outside, Digging"	4:31

== Chart positions ==
Chart (2014)	Peak position
Australian Albums (ARIA)	25
Belgian Albums (Ultratop Flanders)	77
Dutch Albums (Album Top 100)	21
French Albums (SNEP)	122
Irish Albums Chart	2
Irish Independent Albums Chart	1
Swiss Albums (Schweizer Hitparade)	78
UK Albums Chart	28
UK Independent Albums Chart	3
US Billboard 200	76
US Top Alternative Albums (Billboard)	14
US Americana/Folk Albums (Billboard)	7
US Independent Albums (Billboard)	15
US Top Rock Albums (Billboard)	20

== Release history ==
Country	Date	Label
Ireland	10 January 2014	Believe Recordings, EMI
United Kingdom	13 January 2014	Believe Recordings, EMI
United States	14 January 2014	Vagrant Records
