= The Wood and the Wire =

Studio album by Fairport Convention
- Released: November 1999
- Recorded: 1999
- Genre: British folk rock
- Label: Woodworm

Fairport Convention chronology
Who Knows Where the Time Goes? (1997)	The Wood and the Wire (1999)	XXXV (2002)

Professional ratings
Review scores
Source	Rating
Allmusic	4/5 stars

The Wood and the Wire is album released in 1999 by British folk rock band Fairport Convention. It is the twenty-ninth album released by the band since their debut, Fairport Convention, in 1968.

Gerry Conway returned to Fairport on drums for his first appearance since 1973, but the album most strongly features Chris Leslie, who alone and with Nigel Stonier, composed and took lead parts on most of it. The result, according to Allmusic, was that "Leslie seems to have been part of this "moveable feast" for much longer than three years.". Dave Pegg would later comment "Nigel Stonier is a great producer, writer and musician. He has really been very beneficial in helping with Chris Leslie's songwriting. The two of them have written some great songs together which seem to fit the Fairport repertoire really well."

The shop shown on the cover is in Banbury, Oxfordshire, and the boy looking into the window is Chris Leslie's son, Sam.

== Track listing ==
All tracks credited to Chris Leslie and Nigel Stonier unless otherwise noted

1. "The Wood and the Wire" - 4:08
2. "The Dancer" (Chris Leslie) - 4:23
3. "Wandering Man" - 4:51
4. "The Heart of the Song" (Peter Scrowther) - 3:41
5. "A Year and a Day" (Ric Sanders) - 4:14
6. "The Game Pieces" - 4:13
7. "Close to You" (Chris Leslie) - 4:21
8. "Still a Mystery" - 2:40
9. "Banbury Fair" (Chris Leslie) - 4:37
10. "The Lady Vanishes" - 4:52
11. "The Good Fortunes" (Traditional; arrangement by Sanders and Leslie) - 3:59
12. "Western Wind" (Traditional; arrangement by Susan McKeown, Simon Nicol, Dave Pegg, Ric Sanders, Chris Leslie and Gerry Conway) - 5:07
13. "Don't Leave Too Soon" - 4:26
14. "Rocky Road" (Steve Tilston)/"The Quaker" (Traditional; arrangement by Nicol, Pegg, Sanders, Leslie and Conway) - 5:01

Bonus live tracks on 2005 release

1. "The Good Fortunes"(Traditional; arrangement by Ric Sanders and Chris Leslie) - 4:29
2. "Now Be Thankful" (Richard Thompson, Dave Swarbrick) - 3:44

== Personnel ==
Fairport Convention

- Simon Nicol - guitar, vocals
- Chris Leslie - bouzouki, mandolin, vocals, didgeridoo
- Ric Sanders - violin
- Dave Pegg - bass guitar, vocals
- Gerry Conway - drums, percussion

Technical

- Mark Tucker - production, engineering, mixing
- John Dent - mastering
- Mick Toole - design, cover photo
- Bob Battersby - photography
