= We Move =

Studio album by James Vincent McMorrow
- Released: 2 September 2016
- Recorded: Los Angeles, CA; Toronto, Canada; Dublin, Ireland
- Genre: Alternative R&B
- Length: 44:17
- Labels: Faction Records (IRE); Believe Recordings (UK); Mahogany Books / Burning Rope (US)
- Producers: McMorrow; Frank Dukes; Nineteen85; Two Inch Punch

James Vincent McMorrow chronology
Post Tropical (2014)	We Move (2016)	True Care (2017)

Singles from We Move
- 1. "Rising Water" Released: 5 July 2016; 2. "Evil" Released: 10 October 2016; 3. "Get Low" Released: 25 January 2017; 4. "One Thousand Times" Released: 13 March 2017

Professional ratings
Aggregate scores
Source	Rating
Metacritic	78/100
Review scores
Source	Rating
AllMusic	3.5/5 stars
Financial Times	4/5 stars
The Irish Times	4/5 stars
Rolling Stone Australia	3/5 stars

We Move is the third studio album by Irish singer-songwriter James Vincent McMorrow. Produced in part by Nineteen85 and Frank Dukes, the album marks the musician's transition from folk to minimalistic R&B. It was recorded in Los Angeles, Toronto and Dublin, and released on 2 September 2016.

== Background ==
James Vincent McMorrow met producer Nineteen85 in 2014 in Toronto, when they were introduced to work together on material for other artists. However, McMorrow kept most of the results of the collaboration to himself. In an interview with the London Evening Standard, he said about Nineteen85, "He was the catalyst for the album. He was the one constantly texting and emailing me, wanting to know when we were gonna make my record. He saw something in it that I wasn't seeing at the time. He heard something."

On the album, McMorrow opens up and sings for the first time about mental health problems he had as a teenager. The song "I Lie Awake Every Night" deals with an eating disorder that left him hospitalised in a mental health unit weighing somewhere between 32 and 35 kilograms. McMorrow said in the interview, "I just wasn't coping well with life. ... I just have a predisposition towards control and wanting to have control of my life. The classic thing with eating disorders is that when life is out of control, it's the one thing that you can control." He also admitted that the mental health problems were something he ran away from pretty aggressively when he was in his twenties. "I'm a classic example of a person who keeps their mouth shut. I just ran away from it going, 'I’m fine, I'm totally grand'. Now I have things to say that I wasn't confident enough to sing or talk about five years ago."

== Promotion ==
The album is promoted by the lead single "Rising Water", which was released on 5 July 2016. A music video for the song, directed by David M. Helman, was released on 8 August 2016. In October and November 2016, McMorrow will also tour Europe and the United States in support of the album.

== Track listing ==
No.	Title	Writer(s)	Producer(s)	Length
1.	"Rising Water"	James Vincent McMorrow; Paul Jeffries	McMorrow; Nineteen85^{[a]}	4:55
2.	"I Lie Awake Every Night"	McMorrow; Adam King Feenley	Frank Dukes	3:19
3.	"Last Story"	McMorrow	Nineteen85; McMorrow^{[a]}	4:47
4.	"One Thousand Times"	McMorrow; Jeffries	Nineteen85; McMorrow^{[a]}; Ross Dowling^{[a]}	3:19
5.	"Evil"	McMorrow	Two Inch Punch; McMorrow^{[a]}; Dowling^{[a]}	4:41
6.	"Get Low"	McMorrow	Nineteen85	4:10
7.	"Killer Whales"	McMorrow	Two Inch Punch; McMorrow^{[a]}	5:00
8.	"Seek Another"	McMorrow	McMorrow	4:08
9.	"Surreal"	McMorrow	Nineteen85; McMorrow^{[a]}; Dowling^{[a]}	5:38
10.	"Lost Angles"	McMorrow	McMorrow	4:20

Notes

- ^{^[a]} signifies a co-producer

== Personnel ==
Credits adapted from AllMusic

Musicians

- James Byrne – drums
- Frank Dukes – CS-80, Juno (track 2)
- Kaan Gunesberk – bass, electric guitar, background vocals (track 2)
- James Vincent McMorrow – vocals, drums, Fender Jazz bass, Fender Rhodes, electric guitar, keyboards, Moog bass, piano, Polysix, Prophet 5, synthesizer, synthesizer bass, Yamaha keyboards
- Nineteen85 – bass, keyboards, piano, synthesizer, synthesizer bass
- Two Inch Punch – keyboards, synthesizer, synthesizer bass

Additional personnel

- Samuel Burgess-Johnson – design
- Emma Doyle – cover photo

Technical

- Greg Calbi – mastering
- John Davis – mastering
- Kevin Dietz – engineering
- Jimmy Douglas – mixing
- Ross Dowling – additional production, engineering, mixing
- Frank Dukes – drum programming, production
- Phil Hayes – drum engineering, engineering
- John O'Mahony – mixing
- James Vincent McMorrow – production, additional production
- Nineteen85 – drum programming, production
- Two Inch Punch – drum programming, production

== Charts ==
Chart (2016)	Peak position
Australian Albums (ARIA)	28
Belgian Albums (Ultratop Flanders)	52
Belgian Albums (Ultratop Wallonia)	133
Dutch Albums (Album Top 100)	39
French Albums (SNEP)	105
Irish Albums (IRMA)	1
New Zealand Heatseekers Albums (RMNZ)	3
Scottish Albums (Official Charts)	46
Swiss Albums (Schweizer Hitparade)	63
UK Albums (Official Charts)	47

== Release history ==
Country	Date	Label
Ireland	2 September 2016	Faction Records
United Kingdom	2 September 2016	Believe Recordings
United States	2 September 2016	Mahogany Books / Burning Rope
