= True Care =

Studio album by James Vincent McMorrow
- Released: 26 May 2017
- Recorded: 2016
- Label: Faction

James Vincent McMorrow chronology
We Move (2016)	True Care (2017)	Grapefruit Season (2021)

True Care is the fourth studio album from Irish singer-songwriter James Vincent McMorrow It was released on 26 May 2017 by Faction Records. The album has peaked at number 22 on the Irish Albums Chart.

== Critical reception ==
Tony Clayton-Lea from The Irish Times said, "An artist such as James Vincent McMorrow is commercially successful only on a certain level, so announcing a new album – arriving less than 10 months after his third, the tactically planned We Move – isn’t the most financially astute of decisions. There is, however, method in his unorthodox approach. The songs here, on the other hand, are sometimes flawed, occasionally faltering, but always within the grasp of the listener. By being “reactive to the world” he lives in, McMorrow has learned a crucial tortoise/hare lesson: instinct beats intellect every time."

Ed Power from the Irish Examiner said, "With all due respect to his fanbase in Ireland it is fair to say the world was not exactly crying out for new material from McMorrow. Yet as unexpected treats go, True Care is a sublime, abstracted gift that keeps on giving."

== Track listing ==
No.	Title	Length
1.	"December 2914"	3:56
2.	"True Care"	3:54
3.	"National"	3:33
4.	"Thank You"	4:39
5.	"Interlude No. 1"	1:52
6.	"Constellations"	3:16
7.	"Holding On"	3:18
8.	"Bears"	3:42
9.	"Pink Salt Lake"	2:44
10.	"Interlude No. 2"	1:49
11.	"Bend Your Knees"	5:06
12.	"Change of Heart"	2:44
13.	"Glad It's Raining"	3:13
14.	"Don't Wait Forever"	2:10
15.	"Outro"	1:56

== Charts ==
Chart performance for True Care
Chart (2017)	Peak position
Irish Albums (IRMA)	22

== Release history ==
Release history and formats for True Care
Region	Date	Format	Label
Ireland	26 May 2017	Digital download; CD	Faction
