= Over the Next Hill =

Studio album by Fairport Convention
- Released: 2004
- Recorded: March – April 2004
- Genre: British folk rock
- Label: Matty Grooves Records
- Producer: Dave Pegg

Fairport Convention chronology
XXXV (2002)	Over the Next Hill (2004)	Sense of Occasion (2007)

Professional ratings
Review scores
Source	Rating
Allmusic	3.5/5 stars

Over the Next Hill is a 2004 album by the band Fairport Convention.

== Recording ==
The album was recorded during March and April 2004 at Dave Pegg's Woodworm Studio, Barford St. Michael, Oxfordshire, UK. It was engineered and mixed by Mark Tucker, and the executive producer was Dave Pegg. It was the first release on the band's newly created Matty Grooves Records label.

== Reception ==
Over the Next Hill was described by Mojo as "simply [Fairport's] best album in 25 years".

== Track listing ==
1. "Over the Next Hill" (Steve Tilston) – 4:21
2. "I'm Already There" (Chris Leslie) – 6:41
3. "Wait for the Tide to Come In" (Ben Bennion) – 4:37
4. "Canny Capers" (Ric Sanders) – 5:11
5. "Over the Falls" (Chris Leslie) – 4:31
6. "The Wassail Song" (Traditional; arranged by Fairport Convention) – 3:16
7. "The Fossil Hunter" (Chris Leslie) – 6:15
8. "Willow Creek" (Steve Tilston, Chris Parkinson) – 3:51
9. "Westward" (Julie Matthews) – 4:09
10. "Some Special Place" (Ric Sanders) – 3:39
11. "Si Tu Dois Partir" – (Bob Dylan) 3:27
12. "Auld Lang Syne" (hidden track) - (Traditional)

== Personnel ==
- Simon Nicol – guitar, vocals
- Ric Sanders – mandolin, violin
- Chris Leslie – mandolin, bouzouki, violin, ukulele, vocals, Native American flute, electric mandolin
- Dave Pegg – 5-string bass, acoustic bass guitar, mandolin, vocals, double bass
- Gerry Conway – percussion, drums

Additional personnel

- Martin Lamble – percussion on "Si Tu Dois Partir" (added from original 1969 recording)
- Anna Ryder – accordion
- Chris While – vocals on "Si Tu Dois Partir"
- Simon & Hilary Mayor – vocals on "Auld Lang Syne"
