= Don't Stop Singing =

Studio album by Thea Gilmore and Sandy Denny
- Released: 7 November 2011
- Recorded: 2011
- Genre: Folk, folk rock
- Label: Island
- Producer: Nigel Stonier

Thea Gilmore and Sandy Denny chronology
John Wesley Harding (2011)	Don't Stop Singing (2011)	Regardless (2013)

Don't Stop Singing is a collaboration album between the folk singer-songwriters Thea Gilmore and the late Sandy Denny.

In late 2010, Gilmore was commissioned by Sandy Denny’s estate, in conjunction with Island Records, to write melodies for unfinished manuscripts, lyrics without music, and works in progress and so to finally bring some of Denny's last works to the world.

== Reception ==
Caroline Sullivan of The Guardian wrote that "if any British singer was the woman for the job, it was Gilmore, whose tender style is profoundly reminiscent of Denny's", and called the album "a gem in its own right". The Independent's Nick Coleman called it a "slightly over-orchestrated set of semi-powerful ballads, which is deeply felt and worthy of your interest."

== Tracks ==
All songs were written by Sandy Denny and Thea Gilmore except where noted

1. "Glistening Bay" – 4:28
2. "Don't Stop Singing " – 4:12
3. "Frozen Time" – 3:09
4. "Goodnight" – 3:20
5. "London" – 4:38
6. "Pain In My Heart"
7. "Sailor"
8. "Song #4"
9. "Long Time Gone"
10. "Georgia"

== Personnel ==
- Thea Gilmore – vocals, guitar
- Benji Kirkpatrick – guitar, bouzouki, mandolin, panjo
- Nigel Stonier – guitar, piano, harmonium, bass, ukulele, melodica, harmonica
- John Kirkpatrick – accordion, concertina
- Paul Beavis – drums, percussion
