= Thea Gilmore =

English musician (born 1979)

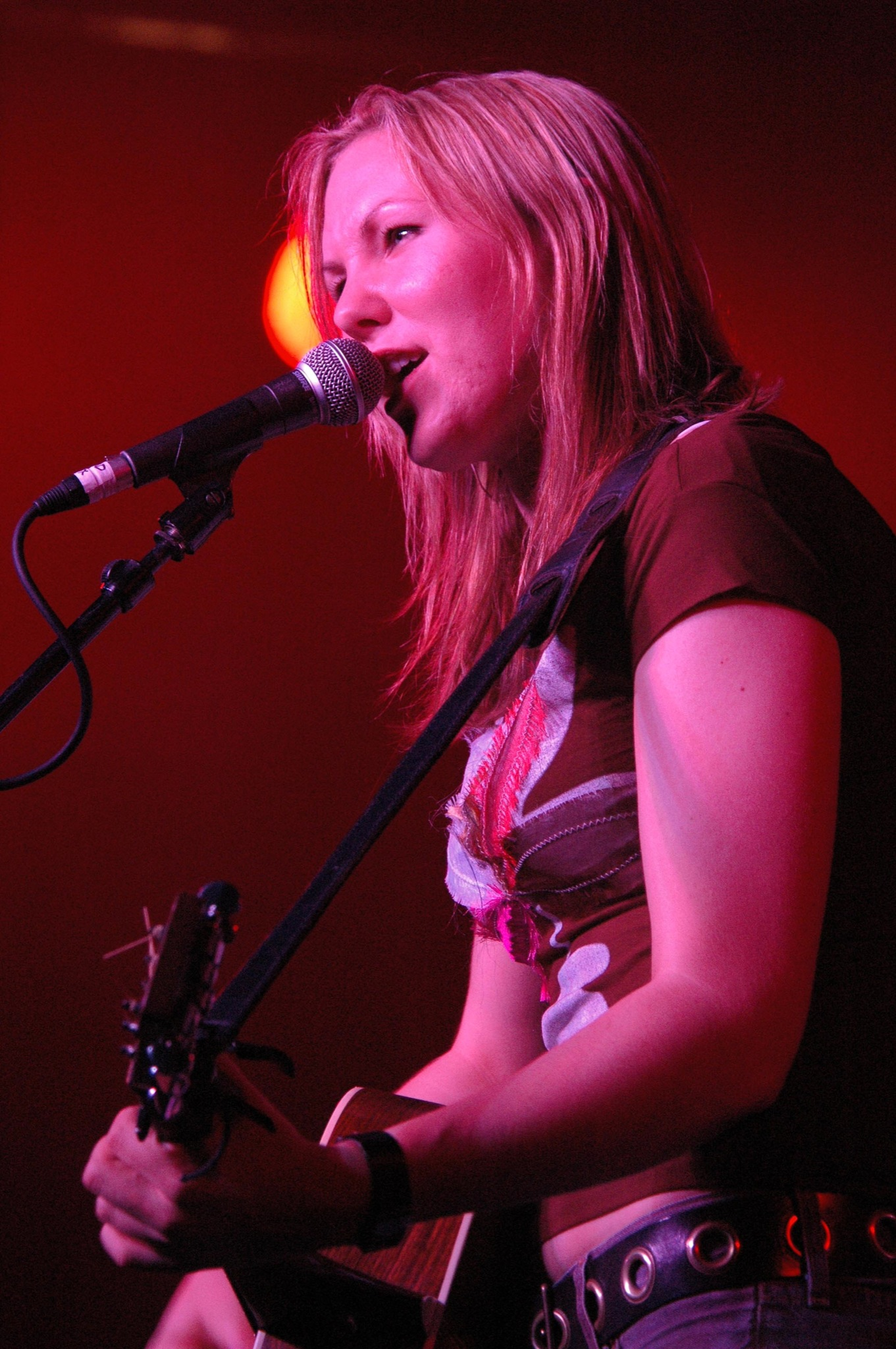
- Gilmore in 2004

Background information
- Also known as: Afterlight
- Born: Thea Eve Gilmore; 25 November 1979 (age 46); Oxford, England
- Genres: Rock, folk
- Occupation: Musician
- Instruments: Vocals, guitar
- Years active: 1996–present
- Labels: Cooking Vinyl; Hungry Dog/Flying Sparks; Sanctuary; Fruitcake/Fullfill; Ryko
- Website: theagilmore.net

Thea Eve Gilmore (born 25 November 1979), also known as Afterlight, is an English singer-songwriter. She has released more than twenty albums since her 1998 debut, Burning Dorothy. She has had three top 40 entries on the UK Albums Chart and one on the UK Singles Chart. Her first album as Afterlight was released on 15 October 2021.

== Early life ==
Gilmore was born in Oxford to Irish parents and lived in the village of North Aston, Oxfordshire. She became interested in music as a result of her father's record collection, which included work by Bob Dylan, Joni Mitchell, and The Beatles. Later, she listened to Elvis Costello, Tom Waits, and The Replacements, among others. Having always written poetry and stories, she began seriously writing songs at the age of 15.

== Career ==
Gilmore began her career at 16 while doing work experience in a recording studio, where she met producer Nigel Stonier. She released her first album as a teenager, entitled Burning Dorothy, in 1998. Over the next four years, she released increasingly well-received albums that earned her a reputation in the UK music press but no chart success.

In 2002, Gilmore shared lead vocals with Kellie While, beside musicians Maartin Allcock, John Kirkpatrick, Robbie McIntosh, Michael McGoldrick and Simon Swarbrick in the Reel and Soul Association. The project mixed American soul and British folk music. The group's eponymously titled album gained considerable mainstream attention which resulted in numerous TV appearances and radio broadcasts including the BBC's Top of the Pops 2.

Gilmore finally made a breakthrough at 23 with the release of Avalanche in August 2003, which became her first album to break into the Official UK Album Chart, at No. 62, and spawned two minor hit singles, "Juliet (Keep That in Mind)" and "Mainstream", for which she garnered acclaim for producing a low-budget music video filmed in a local Virgin Megastore. The video received exposure on the BBC's flagship music show Top of the Pops 2.

In 2004, folk singer Joan Baez personally invited Gilmore to open for her during her tour leading up to the US presidential election. In 2005, Gilmore continued touring commitments, for the first time not releasing a new album (the covers collection Loft Music was widely released during 2004).

Gilmore returned to recording with the release of Harpo's Ghost in August 2006, after a two-and-a-half-year absence of new material. This was her first album on major label Sanctuary Records after many years of independent releases. The album was once again acclaimed in the music press and UK radio lent their support to the single "Cheap Tricks".

Subsequent to the release of Harpo's Ghost she parted company with her manager, left Sanctuary Records and released an EP The Threads independently on her March 2007 UK tour, with remaining copies sold on her website afterwards.

On 19 May 2008, Fruitcake Records (via Fullfill and distributed by Universal Records) released Liejacker, Gilmore's eighth album featuring contributions from Joan Baez, Dave McCabe, and Erin McKeown. It was preceded on 12 May by the single "Old Soul", a duet with McCabe. In June 2008, Gilmore signed to Rykodisc (Warner) for the United States. Liejacker was released in the US on 23 September 2008.

Gilmore's first live album, Recorded Delivery, was released on 25 May 2009, on Fullfill/Universal. The recordings are taken from UK shows during 2006 and 2008, with the first half of the album being acoustic and the second half electric, with a full band. In July 2009 she released a yearly subscription service / fan club, Angels in the Abattoir. Gilmore rounded out 2009 with the release of an album of Christmas- and winter-themed songs, Strange Communion.

Beginning in October 2010, Gilmore and her band were engaged in a UK tour and had good reviews.

In January 2011, Gilmore appeared at Glasgow Royal Concert Hall in a tribute concert celebrating the 70th birthday of Bob Dylan. She performed versions of "I Pity the Poor Immigrant" and "Masters of War." Subsequently, Gilmore entered the studio and recorded the entire set of tracks found on Dylan's original release of John Wesley Harding. The album – also titled John Wesley Harding – was released 23 May 2011. 2011 saw the release of Don't Stop Singing, a collaboration with the estate of the Sandy Denny to set music to lyrics and other later writings of the legendary singer, who had died in 1978. The CD single "London" was released from the album in 2012 and was featured on the BBC coverage of the London 2012 Olympics montage of Team GB medal winners. The single was also released as an exclusive Record Store Day 7″ single.

In 2013, Gilmore released a new album of original material, Regardless, to critical acclaim and much exposure on BBC Radio 2. In May 2015 Ghosts And Graffiti was released, a retrospective with four new songs and six newly recorded versions of songs from her back catalogue. Gilmore released The Counterweight in June 2017 through Cooking Vinyl Records. Small World Turning followed in 2019. She also has been releasing music via the crowd-funding website Patreon, both new songs and rarities recorded earlier in her career.

In late 2021, Gilmore released two albums back to back: The Emancipation of Eva Grey and Afterlight. According to her website, the albums' "songs share the same subject matter", with Emancipation being the last produced under the name "Thea Gilmore", and Afterlight the first produced by the "newly personified Afterlight".

== Personal life ==
On 14 November 2006, Gilmore gave birth to her first child, Egan Stonier, having conducted a UK tour in the autumn whilst heavily pregnant.

On July 20th 2011, Gilmore gave birth to a second son, Asher Joad Gilmore Stonier.

== Discography ==
=== Albums ===
As Thea Gilmore

- Burning Dorothy (1998)
- The Lipstick Conspiracies (2000)
- Rules For Jokers (2001)
- Songs from the Gutter (2002)
- Avalanche (2003) UK No. 63
- Loft Music (2004)
- Harpo's Ghost (2006) UK No. 69
- Liejacker (2008)
- Recorded Delivery [live] (2009)
- Strange Communion (2009)
- Murphy's Heart (2010) UK No. 70
- John Wesley Harding (2011)
- Don't Stop Singing with Sandy Denny (2011) UK No. 89
- Regardless (2013) UK No. 39
- Ghosts and Graffiti (2015) UK No. 39
- The Counterweight (2017) UK No. 40
- Extended Playground (2017)
- Small World Turning (2019) No. 45
- The Emancipation of Eva Grey (2021)
- Thea Gilmore (2023)
- These Quiet Friends (2025)

As Afterlight

- Afterlight (2021)

=== EPs ===
- Instead of the Saints (1998)
- As If EP (Limited Edition) (2001)
- The Threads EP (Limited Edition) (2007)
- Beginners EP (Limited Edition) (2012)
- Girl Mercury EP (Limited Edition) (2015)
- The New Tin Drum (Limited Edition) (2017)

=== Singles ===
- "Saviours and All" (2001)
- "Fever Beats" (2002)
- "Juliet (Keep That in Mind)" (2003) UK No. 35
- "Mainstream" (2003) UK No. 50
- "Cheap Tricks" (2006)
- "Old Soul" (2008)
- "You Spin Me Right Round" (2008)
- "That'll Be Christmas" (2009)
- "You're The Radio" (2010)
- "Teach Me to Be Bad" (2010)
- "London" (lyrics by Sandy Denny) (2012) UK No. 86
- "Love Came Looking for Me" (2013)
- "Live Out Loud" (2015)

=== DVDs ===
- Harpo's Ghost – 3 track acoustic performance (2006)
