= Contact (Noisettes album) =

Studio album by Noisettes
- Released: 26 August 2012
- Recorded: 2010–11
- Genre: Pop
- Label: Mono-ra-rama
- Producer: Jim Abiss, Noisettes

Noisettes chronology
Wild Young Hearts (2009)	Contact (2012)

Singles from Contact
- 1. "That Girl" Released: 12 August 2012

Contact is the third studio album by British group Noisettes, released in the United Kingdom on 26 August 2012 by Mono-ra-rama. The album includes the single "That Girl". The album peaked to number 30 on the UK Albums Chart.

== Background ==
On 28 June 2012, the band announced that Contact was the name of their third album. Discussing the album, Shingai Shoniwa said: "The album starts with a big 30-piece orchestra and ends with just Dan and I singing and just the cackling of the wood and the flames of the fire for accompaniment." Dan Smith said: "Me and Shingai are a great double act in the studio [...] the trousers are on a rota. Sometimes I wear them and sometimes she does and occasionally we get a leg."

== Critical reception ==
The album has so far been well received by critics. At Metacritic, which assigns a normalised rating out of 100 to reviews from mainstream critics, the album received an average score of 77, based on 9 reviews, which indicates "generally favourable reviews". Ally Carnwath of The Observer gave the album a positive review stating, "There's no volte-face here; chart-friendly electropop and retro soul predominate, and though there's variety in the mandolin strum of Rag Top Car and the title track's orchestral balladry, these are smooth gear changes rather than detours. Still, Shingai Shoniwa's vocals supply enough personality to elevate them above standard winebar fare." Caroline Sullivan of The Guardian gave the album a positive review, calling it a "frothfest of colour and light, with a joyous disregard for genre boundaries, but almost zilch in the way of introspection. [...] The eclecticism of a record that flits from trad country (Ragtop Car) to bossa nova (Star) and indie-disco [...] would feel a bit scattergun if Shoniwa and guitarist Dan Smith weren't so obviously fans of each style they tackle. This isn't one of those albums that diddles around with multiple genres solely in the hope of expanding a band's fanbase."

== Singles ==
- "Winner" was released as buzz track from the album, which was available to download for free on their official Facebook page, in support of that year's GB Olympic team.
- "That Girl" was released as the lead single from the album on 12 August 2012. The song peaked to number 87 on the UK singles chart.

== Track listing ==
Standard edition
No.	Title	Writer(s)	Producer(s)	Length
1.	"Transmission Will Start"	Shingai Shoniwa, Dan Smith, Toby Couling	Noisettes, Jim Abbiss	0:46
2.	"I Want You Back"	Shoniwa, Smith, Chuck Harmony	Noisettes, Abbiss	4:02
3.	"Final Call"	Shoniwa, Smith, Mike Elizondo	Noisettes, Abbiss	3:44
4.	"Winner"	Shoniwa, Smith, Jean Baptiste, Michael McHenry, Sylvia Gordan, Alain Whyte	Freeschool	3:15
5.	"Let the Music Play"	Shoniwa, Smith, Couling	Noisettes	3:34
6.	"Travelling Light"	Shoniwa, Smith, August Rigo	Noisettes, Abbiss	4:36
7.	"That Girl"	Shoniwa, Smith	Noisettes	3:13
8.	"Ragtop Car"	Shoniwa, Smith	Noisettes	3:49
9.	"Never Enough"	Shoniwa, Smith, Baptiste	Freeschool	4:03
10.	"Love Power"	Shoniwa, Smith, Couling	Noisettes, Abbiss	3:53
11.	"Free"	Shoniwa, Smith, Harmony	Noisettes, Richard Morris	4:03
12.	"Star"	Shoniwa, Smith, Harmony	Noisettes, Abbiss	4:04
13.	"Contact"	Shoniwa, Smith, Couling	Noisettes, Abbiss	3:55
14.	"Nothing is Lost" (hidden track)	Snoniwa, Smith	Noisettes, Morris	3:44

Amazon.com bonus track
No.	Title	Length
14.	"You're the Leader" (bonus track)	3:11

iTunes bonus content
No.	Title	Length
14.	"Prisoner of Love" (Bonus Track)	3:51
15.	"Music Never Dies (Dub)" (Bonus Track)	4:28
16.	"Mesmerise" (bonus track)	4:41

== Chart performance ==
On 2 September 2012, the album entered the UK Albums Chart at number 30. The album dropped to number 84 in its second week. The album also peaked to number 35 on the Scottish Albums Chart.

=== Charts ===
Chart (2012)	Peak position
UK Albums Chart	30
Scottish Albums Chart	35

== Release history ==
Region	Release date	Format	Label
United Kingdom	26 August 2012	Digital download	Mono-ra-rama
United Kingdom	27 August 2012	CD	Mono-ra-rama
