= Never Forget You (Noisettes song) =

2009 single by Noisettes

Single by Noisettes

from the album Wild Young Hearts
- Released: 21 June 2009
- Studio: Mayfair (London)
- Genre: Soul
- Length: 3:12
- Label: Vertigo
- Songwriters: Shingai Shoniwa; Daniel Smith; Jamie Morrison; George Astasio; Jason Pebworth
- Producer: Jim Abbiss

Noisettes singles chronology
"Don't Upset the Rhythm (Go Baby Go)" (2009)	"Never Forget You" (2009)	"That Girl" (2012)

Music video
- "Never Forget You" on YouTube

"Never Forget You" is a song by English band Noisettes from their second studio album, Wild Young Hearts (2009). Released on 21 June 2009 as the album's third and final single, the song was written by the band members. It peaked at number 20 on the UK Singles Chart in August 2009.

== Critical reception ==
The single was featured as one of USA Today's "Picks of the Week" for 14 July 2009 with the following comment, "the Brit pop trio's bubbly soul ditty is, thanks to Shingai Shoniwa's sweet crooning, reminiscent of an early Motown party groove."

== Music video ==
The music video has three concurrent themes. The primary setting begins as Shingai Shoniwa exits a factory/warehouse-type building (Alexandra Palace, North London) via blue doors. She sips a drink from a bottle, puts the bottle down and pulls on a gold bass-guitar over her shoulder. The camera pans down to her silver Dr. Martens boots, which feature in the song lyrics. After singing the first few lines of the song, her attention shifts to a blue convertible car, a Chesil Speedster (a replica of a classic Porsche 356), which she then walks over to, climbing into the passenger seat. After sitting there, as if almost pondering on past memories, she takes off her silver boots, and places them on the back seat of the car.

After walking barefoot back into the building, almost closing the door, she peeks through the gap to see an anonymous male get into the vehicle and drive off with the boots still in the back. While this scene plays out, which primarily relates to the lyrics of the song, the camera frequently cuts to Noisettes, complete with orchestral accompaniments and backing singers, practicing in what appears to be a derelict theatre (old smoke damaged theatre at Alexandra Palace), lit with a soft red light. Shoniwa is dressed in a kitsch, white tasseled dress, dancing barefoot (from removing the boots previously). Towards the end of the video, the camera begins to frequently cut to the circle balcony above the rehearsal space, where Shoniwa can be seen again, this time dressed in black, singing out over the balcony. As the music ends, the final shot shows a silhouette of Shoniwa in front of a giant red orb, as the camera pans out slightly and fades to black.

== Track listing ==
Digital download

1. "Never Forget You"
2. "Never Forget You" (FP remix)
3. "When You Were Young" (Radio 1 Live Lounge)
4. "Never Forget You" (video)

== Charts ==
=== Weekly charts ===
Chart (2009)	Peak position
Belgium (Ultratop 50 Flanders)	25
Belgium (Ultratip Bubbling Under Wallonia)	7
Hungary (Rádiós Top 40)	6
Ireland (IRMA)	24
Switzerland (Schweizer Hitparade)	73
UK Singles (OCC)	20

=== Year-end charts ===
Chart (2009)	Position
Hungary (Rádiós Top 40)	74
UK Singles (OCC)	115

== Certifications ==
Region	Certification	Certified units/sales
United Kingdom (BPI)	Platinum	600,000^{‡}
^{‡} Sales+streaming figures based on certification alone.

== Release history ==
Region	Release date	Format	Label(s)	Ref.
United Kingdom	21 June 2009	Digital download	Mercury; Vertigo	

== In other media ==
- Noisettes performed "Never Forget You" on One Tree Hill in 2009.
- Noisettes performed the song on The Wendy Williams Show on 11 August 2009.
- Featured on the soundtrack for the 2010 movie Leap Year.
- Jai McConnell, a contestant on the third series of The Voice UK performed the song in her blind audition. All four coaches turned around, praising her unique sound. She opted to go with Kylie Minogue. Her audition currently has a million views on YouTube.
- Featured in Chance Encounters, the first episode of the 2021 Netflix series Behind Her Eyes.
