= Don't Give Up (Noisettes song) =

Single by Noisettes

from the album What's the Time Mr Wolf?
- Released: 17 November 2006
- Genre: Pop-punk
- Length: 2:31
- Label: Mercury
- Songwriters: Shingai Shoniwa, Dan Smith, Jamie Morrison

Noisettes singles chronology
"Scratch Your Name" (2006)	"Don't Give Up" (2006)	"Sister Rosetta (Capture The Spirit)" (2007)

"Don't Give Up" was the third single from What's the Time Mr Wolf? by the UK indie rock band Noisettes. It was released as a CD single and Vinyl 7" in November 2006. This song has featured in FIFA 08, been part of the five songs played in-game on FIFA Online 2, on the soundtrack to the film St Trinian's and the video game Driver: San Francisco.

== Track listing ==
- "Don't Give Up" CD single Released 17 November 2006
1. "Don't Give Up" 2:30
2. "For All We Know" ?:??
- "Don't Give Up" Vinyl 7" Released 20 November 2006
1. Don't Give Up 2:30
2. For All We Know ?:??
3. Speedhorn 4:38
4. What Kind Of Model ?:??

== Critical ==
The song made Rolling Stone's April 2007 list of the Editor's Favorite Albums, Singles and Videos, with the comment "This punky British threesome goes batshit with 'Train Kept A-Rollin''' fuzz guitar and a relentless groove: It all sounds like the soundtrack to a really fun knife fight."
