= Wild Young Hearts =

2009 studio album by Noisettes

Studio album by Noisettes
- Released: 20 April 2009
- Recorded: 2007–2008
- Studios: Mayfair (London); RAK (London)
- Genre: Indie-soul
- Label: Vertigo
- Producer: Jim Abbiss

Noisettes chronology
What's the Time Mr Wolf? (2007)	Wild Young Hearts (2009)	Contact (2012)

Singles from Wild Young Hearts
- 1. "Wild Young Hearts" Released: 29 December 2008; 2. "Don't Upset the Rhythm (Go Baby Go)" Released: 23 March 2009; 3. "Never Forget You" Released: 15 June 2009

Wild Young Hearts is the second studio album by English indie-soul group Noisettes, released in the United Kingdom on 20 April 2009 by Vertigo Records, and the United States on 22 September 2009 by Mercury Records. Three singles were released from the album – "Wild Young Hearts", "Don't Upset the Rhythm (Go Baby Go)", and "Never Forget You", with "Every Now and Then" meant to be released as the fourth single, but was cancelled.

== Singles ==
- The first single released from the album was the title track – "Wild Young Hearts". It was released on 29 December 2008 and the video premiered on the official Noisettes' YouTube channel on 7 January 2009. However, the single failed to enter the UK charts, but was later re-released on 30 August 2009, replacing "Every Now and Then" which was originally meant to be the fourth single. The re-release helped it to reach a peak of number 91 in the UK.
- The second single was "Don't Upset the Rhythm (Go Baby Go)", released on 23 March 2009. There were two videos for the single, the second released less than two months after the first. The song was featured on a Mazda 2 advert, and this helped it to debut at number two in the UK upon release. "Don't Upset the Rhythm" is the group's best selling and performing single, spending 10 weeks in the Top 40 and 22 weeks in the Top 40.
- The third single was "Never Forget You" which was released on 15 June 2009, and made the A list on XFM, Radio 2, Capital and Q radio and was also added to the C list on Radio 1. It debuted at number 68 on downloads alone, and entered the Top 40 at number 31 two weeks later. "Never Forget You" eventually made a peak of number 20 on the week ending 8 August 2009.
- "Every Now and Then" was originally meant to be the album's fourth single, to be released on 30 August 2009. A video was also released, however a few weeks before the song was to be released, it was cancelled and a re-release of "Wild Young Hearts" was released instead.
- A music video for "Saturday Night" was made up of recordings by fans using only Nokia mobile devices, at an exclusive live performance in East London. However, the song was never released as a single.

== Critical reception ==
Professional ratings
Review scores
Source	Rating
AllMusic	3.5/5 stars
The Daily Telegraph	3/5 stars
Digital Spy	4/5 stars
Drowned in Sound	8/10 stars
The Guardian	4/5 stars
musicOMH	4/5 stars
Paste	6.5/10 stars
Pitchfork	(6.7/10)
The Times	4/5 stars

The album received critical acclaim. On review aggregate website Metacritic, it was awarded a rating of 74/100. 4 out of 5 stars was awarded by Digital Spy and 8 out of 10 stars by Drowned in Sound. Essence magazine remarked that the album "has a 1960's-tinged soulful rock sound that stays firmly etched in your mind." Lead Singer Shoniwa's voice and presence was praised, while criticism focused on the merging of multiple genres. The musicians on the album were also heavily praised.

== Track listing ==
All tracks are produced by Jim Abbiss.

No.	Title	Writer(s)	Length
1.	"Sometimes"	Shingai Shoniwa; Daniel Smith; Jamie Morrison	4:06
2.	"Don't Upset the Rhythm (Go Baby Go)"	Shoniwa; Smith; Morrison; George Astasio; Jason Pebworth	3:49
3.	"Wild Young Hearts"	Shoniwa; Smith; Morrison; John Frederick Fortis	2:58
4.	"24 Hours"	Shoniwa; Smith; Morrison; Astasio; Pebworth	3:50
5.	"Every Now and Then"	Shoniwa; Smith; Morrison; Astasio	3:43
6.	"Beat of My Heart"	Shoniwa; Smith; Morrison	3:26
7.	"Atticus"	Shoniwa; Smith; Morrison	4:18
8.	"Never Forget You"	Shoniwa; Smith; Morrison; Astasio; Pebworth	3:12
9.	"So Complicated"	Shoniwa; Smith; Morrison; Fortis	3:10
10.	"Saturday Night"	Shoniwa; Smith; Morrison; Astasio; Pebworth	3:16
11.	"Cheap Kicks"	Shoniwa; Smith; Morrison	4:48

UK iTunes Store pre-order bonus track
No.	Title	Writer(s)	Length
12.	"Ill Wind"	Shoniwa; Smith; Morrison	5:28

US and Canadian edition
No.	Title	Writer(s)	Length
1.	"Wild Young Hearts"	Shoniwa; Smith; Morrison; Fortis	2:57
2.	"Don't Upset the Rhythm (Go Baby Go)"	Shoniwa; Smith; Morrison; Astasio; Pebworth	3:42
3.	"Never Forget You"	Shoniwa; Smith; Morrison; Astasio; Pebworth	3:12
4.	"Saturday Night"	Shoniwa; Smith; Morrison; Astasio; Pebworth	3:15
5.	"Atticus"	Shoniwa; Smith; Morrison	4:17
6.	"Every Now and Then"	Shoniwa; Smith; Morrison; Astasio	3:42
7.	"24 Hours"	Shoniwa; Smith; Morrison; Astasio; Pebworth	3:50
8.	"Beat of My Heart"	Shoniwa; Smith; Morrison	3:24
9.	"Sometimes"	Shoniwa; Smith; Morrison	4:07
10.	"Cheap Kicks"	Shoniwa; Smith; Morrison	4:39
11.	"So Complicated (ITunes US Edition)"	Daniel Smith, Jamie Morrison, John Fortis, Shingai	3:10

== Chart performance ==
In the UK, Wild Young Hearts debuted at number 7 on the week ending 2 May 2009, making it the second highest debut of the week, behind Depeche Mode's Sounds of the Universe who debuted at number two. In its second week, it fell 16 places to number 23, and after another two weeks, it was out of the Top 100. However, the success of "Never Forget You" helped the album return to the Top 40 and climb as high as number nine. On the first chart of 2010, Wild Young Hearts re-entered the Top 40 at number 35. In total, Wild Young Hearts spent 16 weeks in the Top 40 and was certified Gold by the BPI for shipments of over 100,000 copies.

In Ireland, Wild Young Hearts debuted at number 36 on the week ending 23 April 2009, but dropped to number 55 in its second week. The album eventually reached a peak of number 31, the week ending 3 September 2009.

== Personnel ==
Personnel credits adapted from AllMusic and the liner notes of Wild Young Hearts.

- Shingai Shoniwa – vocals, performer, bass, composer, background vocals
- Dan Smith – performer, guitar, composer, percussion
- Jamie Morrison – performer, drums, composer, percussion
- Jim Abbiss – producer, keyboards, tambourine
- Paul Adam & His Mayfair Music – A&R
- George Astasio – writer, composer
- Natalia Bonner – violin
- Duchess Nell Catchpole – violin
- Susan Collins – executive producer
- Ewan Davies – engineer, mixing, tambourine
- Emily Davis – violin
- Calina de la Mare – violin
- Sandrine Dulermo – photography
- Luke Gordon – programming
- Stephen Hussey – violin
- Steven Large – clavinet, piano
- Vicky Matthews – cello
- Jason Pebworth – writer, composer
- Lucy Shaw – double bass, string arrangements
- Lucy Wilkins – violin
- Richard Wilkinson – mixing
- Chris Worsey – cello
- Miriam Nervo – backing vocals, vocal producer
- Olivia Nervo – backing vocals, vocal producer

== Charts ==
=== Weekly charts ===
Chart (2009)	Peak position
Austrian Albums (Ö3 Austria)	71
Belgian Albums (Ultratop Flanders)	60
French Albums (SNEP)	126
Irish Albums (IRMA)	31
Scottish Albums (Official Charts)	19
Swiss Albums (Schweizer Hitparade)	86
UK Albums (Official Charts)	7
US Billboard 200	98

=== Year-end charts ===
Chart (2009)	Position
UK Albums (OCC)	66

== Certifications ==
Region	Certification	Certified units/sales
United Kingdom (BPI)	Gold	100,000^{^}
^{^} Shipments figures based on certification alone.

== Release history ==
Region	Date	Label
United Kingdom	20 April 2009	Vertigo
United States	22 September 2009	Mercury
