= That Girl (Noisettes song) =

Single by Noisettes

from the album Contact
- B-side: "Winner"
- Released: 12 August 2012
- Recorded: 2011
- Genre: Pop
- Length: 3:13
- Label: Mono-ra-rama
- Songwriter(s): Shingai Shoniwa; Daniel Smith

Noisettes singles chronology
"Never Forget You" (2009)	"That Girl" (2012)	"I Want You Back" (2012)

"That Girl" is a song by English indie rock band Noisettes from their third studio album, Contact (2012). It was released as the album's lead single in the United Kingdom as a digital download on 12 August 2012. The song peaked to number 87 on the UK Singles Chart.

== Live performances ==
On 29 August 2012 they performed "That Girl" on BBC Breakfast. On 16 September 2012 they performed the song on The Andrew Marr Show.

== Critical reception ==
Robert Copsey of Digital Spy gave the song a positive review stating:

Shingai Shoniwa sings about a blossoming romance over a peppy, toe-tapping melody that evokes the golden era of surf rockers The Beach Boys and The Honeys. Like a glass of Sex on the Beach, the result is instantly refreshing and guaranteed to loosen those hips..

== Track listing ==
Digital download
No.	Title	Length
1.	"That Girl"	3:13
2.	"Winner"	3:15

== Chart performance ==
=== Weekly charts ===
Chart (2012/13)	Peak position
Belgium (Ultratip Bubbling Under Flanders)	82
UK Singles (The Official Charts Company)	87

== Release history ==
Region	Date	Format	Label
United Kingdom	12 August 2012	Digital Download	Mono-ra-rama
