= Early in the Morning (James Vincent McMorrow album) =

Studio album by James Vincent McMorrow
- Released: 26 February 2010
- Recorded: 2009–10
- Genre: Folk
- Labels: Believe Recordings, Universal Music, Vagrant

James Vincent McMorrow chronology
Early in the Morning (2010)	Post Tropical (2014)

Professional ratings
Review scores
Source	Rating
Allmusic	4/5 stars

Early in the Morning is the first full-length album by Irish singer-songwriter James Vincent McMorrow. The album has drawn comparisons with Bon Iver for both its sound and the recording technique. The album was first released in Ireland on 26 February 2010.

== Track listing ==
All tracks are written by James Vincent McMorrow.

Early in the Morning track listing
No.	Title	Length
1.	"If I Had a Boat"	4:09
2.	"Hear the Noise That Moves So Soft and Low"	4:00
3.	"Sparrow and the Wolf"	3:42
4.	"Breaking Hearts"	4:48
5.	"We Don't Eat"	4:56
6.	"This Old Dark Machine"	4:14
7.	"Follow You Down to the Red Oak Tree"	3:28
8.	"Down the Burning Ropes"	5:00
9.	"From the Woods!!"	3:58
10.	"And If My Heart Should Somehow Stop"	4:33
11.	"Early In the Morning, I'll Come Calling"	2:37

== Chart performance ==
Chart (2010–2011)	Peak position
Dutch Albums Chart	92
French Albums Chart	87
Irish Albums Chart	23
Norwegian Albums Chart	27
UK Albums Chart	73

== Release history ==
Country	Date	Format	Label
Ireland	26 February 2010	Digital download	Universal Music
United Kingdom	7 March 2011	Digital download	Believe Digital
United Kingdom	7 March 2011	CD	Believe Digital
