= Don't Upset the Rhythm (Go Baby Go) =

2009 single by Noisettes

Single by Noisettes

from the album Wild Young Hearts
- Released: 23 March 2009
- Studio: Mayfair (London)
- Length: 3:49 (album version); 3:12 (radio edit)
- Label: Vertigo
- Songwriter(s): Shingai Shoniwa; Daniel Smith; Jamie Morrison; George Astasio; Jason Pebworth
- Producer(s): Jim Abbiss

Noisettes singles chronology
"Wild Young Hearts" (2008)	"Don't Upset the Rhythm (Go Baby Go)" (2009)	"Never Forget You" (2009)

Alternative cover
- Alternate European CD single cover

Music video
- "Don't Upset the Rhythm (Go Baby Go)" on YouTube

"Don't Upset the Rhythm (Go Baby Go)" is a song by English band Noisettes from their second studio album, Wild Young Hearts (2009). Released on 23 March 2009 as the album's second single, the song debuted and peaked at number two on the UK Singles Chart. The official remix features Wale and Estelle. The track was prominently featured in television advertisements for Mazda 2 throughout 2009 and 2010 in the United Kingdom.

== Critical reception ==
Of the track, USA Today said "The London band has a grabber in Shingai Shoniwa's soul-jazz vocal, funky bass lines, snappy guitars and disco beat."

== Chart performance ==
In the United Kingdom, the song made its debut on 29 March 2009 at number two, becoming the band's highest-charting single to date. The song entered the Irish Singles Chart at number 55 on 2 April 2009. On 9 April, "Don't Upset the Rhythm (Go Baby Go)" was the Irish chart's "greatest gainer" of the week after jumping to number 18 and ultimately peaking at number 8.

== Track listing ==
Digital single

1. "Don't Upset the Rhythm (Go Baby Go)" – 3:48
2. "Don't Upset the Rhythm (Go Baby Go)" (Kissy Sell Out in The Black Lodge Remix) – 5:02

== Charts ==
=== Weekly charts ===
Chart (2009)	Peak position
Belgium (Ultratip Bubbling Under Flanders)	4
Europe (European Hot 100 Singles)	4
Ireland (IRMA)	8
Netherlands (Dutch Top 40)	33
Netherlands (Single Top 100)	75
Scotland (OCC)	14
Switzerland (Schweizer Hitparade)	79
UK Singles (OCC)	2
US Hot Dance Club Play (Billboard)	4

=== Year-end charts ===
Chart (2009)	Position
UK Singles (OCC)	43

== Certifications ==
Region	Certification	Certified units/sales
United Kingdom (BPI)	Gold	400,000^{‡}
^{‡} Sales+streaming figures based on certification alone.
