= James Vincent McMorrow =

Irish musician (born 1981)

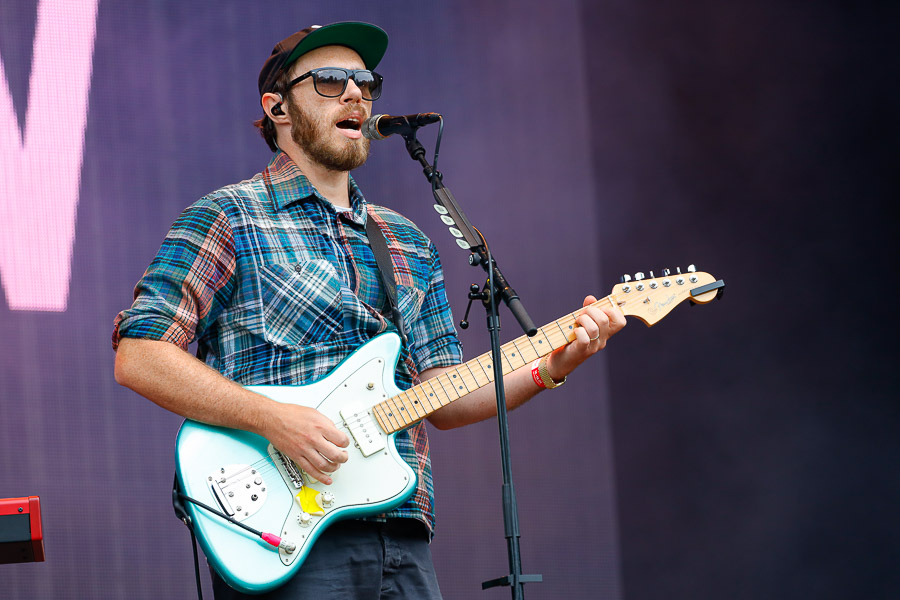
- McMorrow performing in 2022

Background information
- Born: 14 February 1983 (age 43); Dublin, Ireland
- Genres: Folk rock; indie rock; alternative rock
- Occupations: Singer; songwriter
- Instruments: Vocals; guitar; keyboards; banjo; drums
- Labels: Vagrant; Believe Digital; Dew Process; Dine Alone; Faction Records
- Website: jamesvmcmorrow.com

James Vincent McMorrow (born 14 February 1983) is an Irish singer, songwriter, and musician. As of 2026, he has released seven studio albums, three EPs, and numerous singles.

== Career ==
James Vincent McMorrow was born in Dublin, Ireland. His debut album, Early in the Morning, was released in Ireland in February 2010 and in the United States and the rest of Europe in 2011, to widespread acclaim. He made his UK television debut on BBC Two's Later... with Jools Holland on 27 May 2011.

In 2014, he released his second album, Post Tropical. It was recorded in 2013 in the small desert town of Tornillo, 89 kilometres (55 mi) south of El Paso, Texas. The studio is located on a pecan farm, and McMorrow found the location "the most surreal place to work" and one that helped add to the tone of the album and inspire his creativity. He said "I think it's kind of engrained in the record, more than any pinpointed thing. I can hear the hot bedded air in this part. You can hear the birds in the pianos."

In 2016, McMorrow announced his third studio album and released "Rising Water", its lead single. We Move was produced by McMorrow, Nineteen85, Frank Dukes, and Two Inch Punch. Released on 2 September 2016, it marks a shift in McMorrow's style towards more R&B-tinged sounds. His cover of the Chris Isaak song "Wicked Game" was used in the first official full-length trailer for the sixth season of the HBO series Game of Thrones. In April 2016, he was featured on the promotional single "I'm in Love" from Kygo's debut album, Cloud Nine.

In May 2017, McMorrow released his fourth album, True Care, which peaked at number 22 on the Irish Albums Chart. Tony Clayton-Lea from The Irish Times said, "An artist such as James Vincent McMorrow is commercially successful only on a certain level, so announcing a new album – arriving less than 10 months after his third, the tactically planned We Move – isn't the most financially astute of decisions. There is, however, method in his unorthodox approach. The songs here, on the other hand, are sometimes flawed, occasionally faltering, but always within the grasp of the listener. By being "reactive to the world" he lives in, McMorrow has learned a crucial tortoise/hare lesson: instinct beats intellect every time."

McMorrow's 2021 album, titled Grapefruit Season, was produced alongside Paul Epworth, Kenny Beats, Lil Silva, and Patrick Wimberly. He followed it a year later with his sixth record,The Less I Knew.

In 2024, McMorrow issued Wide Open, Horses.

== Awards and nominations ==
In January 2012, McMorrow received a European Border Breakers Award in recognition of Early In The Morning's success beyond Ireland.

== Discography ==
=== Studio albums ===
Title	Details	Peak chart positions										Sales	Certifications
Title	Details	IRE	AUS	BEL (Fl)	CAN	FRA	NL	SCO	SWI	UK	US	Sales	Certifications
Early in the Morning	Released: 26 February 2010; Label: Believe Digital, Vagrant, Dew Process, Dine Alone; Formats: Digital download, CD	22	— (Note: Early in the Morning did not enter the Australian ARIA Albums Chart but peaked at number six on the ARIA Hitseekers Chart.)	143	—	87	68	72	—	68	— (Note: Early in the Morning did not enter the US Billboard 200 but peaked at number 12 on the US Heatseekers Albums Chart.)		BPI: Silver
Post Tropical	Released: 10 January 2014; Label: Believe; Formats: Digital download, CD	2	25	77	—	122	21	43	78	28	76	US: 18,000	
We Move	Released: 2 September 2016; Label: Faction; Formats: Digital download, CD	1	28	52	77	134	39	46	63	47	— (Note: We Move did not enter the US Billboard 200 but peaked at number 84 on the Current Album Sales Chart.)		
True Care	Released: 26 May 2017; Label: Faction; Formats: Digital download, CD	22	—	—	—	—	—	—	—	— (Note: True Care did not enter the UK Albums Chart but peaked at number 90 on the UK Album Downloads Chart.)	—		
Grapefruit Season	Released: 17 September 2021; Label: Sony Music; Formats: Digital download, CD, LP	8	—	—	—	—	—	77	—	84	—		
The Less I Knew	Released: 24 June 2022; Label: Faction; Formats: Digital download	29	—	—	—	—	—	—	—	—	—		
Wide Open, Horses	Released: 4 June 2024; Label: Nettwerk; Formats: Digital download	56	—	—	—	—	—	—	—	—	—		
"—" denotes a recording that did not chart or was not released.

=== EPs ===
Title	Details
The Sparrow and the Wolf	Released: 2008; Label: Faction Records; Formats: Digital download
James Vincent McMorrow	Released: 2010 (United States); Label: Faction Records; Formats: Digital download
We Don't Eat	Released: 2011; Label: Faction Records; Formats: Digital download

=== Singles ===
==== As lead artist ====
Title	Year	Peak chart positions										Certifications	Album
Title	Year	IRE	AUS	BEL (Fl)	BEL (Wa)	FRA	NZ Hot	SCO	UK	UK Indie	US Rock Digital	Certifications	Album
"This Old Dark Machine"	2011	—	—	—	—	—	—	—	—	—	—		Early in the Morning
"Sparrow and the Wolf"	2011	—	—	—	—	—	—	—	—	—	—		Early in the Morning
"We Don't Eat"	2011	—	—	—	—	—	—	—	— (Note: "We Don't Eat" did not enter the UK Singles Chart but peaked at number 19 on the UK Physical Singles chart.)	—	—		Early in the Morning
"Higher Love"	2011	4	35	—	—	—	—	22	21	1	—	ARIA: Platinum; BPI: Gold	We Don't Eat
"Wicked Game"	2012	—	—	—	—	111	—	—	—	44	39		We Don't Eat
"Cavalier"	2014	66	—	—	—	81	—	—	—	44	—		Post Tropical
"Red Dust"	2014	—	—	—	—	—	—	—	—	—	—		Post Tropical
"How to Waste a Moment"	2015	—	—	—	—	—	—	—	—	—	—		Non-album single
"Rising Water"	2016	—	—	— (Note: "Rising Water" did not enter the Flanders Ultratop Top 50 but charted as an extra tip on the Flanders Ultratop Bubbling Under chart.)	— (Note: "Rising Water" did not enter the Wallonie Ultratop Top 50 but charted as an extra tip on the Wallonie Ultratop Bubbling Under chart.)	—	—	—	—	—	—		We Move
"Evil"	2016	—	—	— (Note: "Evil" did not enter the Flanders Ultratop Top 50 but charted as an extra tip on the Flanders Ultratop Bubbling Under chart.)	—	—	—	—	—	—	—		We Move
"Get Low"	2017	—	—	—	—	—	—	—	—	46	—		We Move
"One Thousand Times"	2017	—	—	—	— (Note: "One Thousand Times" did not enter the Wallonie Ultratop Top 50 but charted as an extra tip on the Wallonie Ultratop Bubbling Under chart.)	—	—	—	—	—	—		We Move
"Me and My Friends"	2018	—	—	—	—	—	—	—	—	—	—		Non-album single
"Headlights"	2020	— (Note: "Headlights" did not enter the Irish Singles Chart but peaked at number 11 on the Irish Homegrown Top 20 chart.)	—	—	—	—	—	—	—	—	—		Grapefruit Season
"I Should Go"	2020	—	—	—	— (Note: "I Should Go" did not enter the Wallonie Ultratop Top 50 but charted as an extra tip on the Wallonie Ultratop Bubbling Under chart.)	—	—	—	—	—	—		Grapefruit Season
"Gone"	2020	— (Note: "Gone" did not enter the Irish Singles Chart but peaked at number 11 on the Irish Homegrown Top 20 chart.)	—	—	—	—	—	—	—	—	—		Grapefruit Season
"Be Somebody" (with Rudimental)	2021	— (Note: "Be Somebody" did not enter the Irish Singles Chart but peaked at number 11 on the Irish Homegrown Top 20 chart.)	—	—	—	—	34	—	—	—	—		Ground Control
"Waiting"	2021	— (Note: "Waiting" did not enter the Irish Singles Chart but peaked at number eight on the Irish Homegrown Top 20 chart.)	—	—	—	—	—	—	—	—	—		Grapefruit Season
"Paradise"	2021	— (Note: "Paradise" did not enter the Irish Singles Chart but peaked at number nine on the Irish Homegrown Top 20 chart.)	—	—	—	—	38	—	—	—	—		Grapefruit Season
"Tru Love"	2021	— (Note: "Tru Love" did not enter the Irish Singles Chart but peaked at number nine on the Irish Homegrown Top 20 chart.)	—	—	—	—	—	—	—	—	—		Grapefruit Season
"Planes in the Sky"	2021	— (Note: "Planes in the Sky" did not enter the Irish Singles Chart but peaked at number eight on the Irish Homegrown Top 20 chart.)	—	—	—	—	—	—	—	—	—		Grapefruit Season
"The Less I Knew"	2022	— (Note: "The Less I Knew" did not enter the Irish Singles Chart but peaked at number nine on the Irish Homegrown Top 20 chart.)	—	—	—	—	—	—	—	—	—		The Less I Knew
"Hurricane"	2022	— (Note: "Hurricane" did not enter the Irish Singles Chart but peaked at number nine on the Irish Homegrown Top 20 chart.)	—	—	—	—	—	—	—	—	—		The Less I Knew
"At Christmas"	2022	— (Note: "At Christmas" did not enter the Irish Singles Chart but peaked at number 19 on the Irish Homegrown Top 20 chart.)	—	—	—	—	—	—	—	—	—		Non-album singles
"What are the Chances" (with Man Alive)	2023	—	—	—	—	—	—	—	—	—	—		Non-album singles
"Stay Cool"	2024	—	—	—	—	—	—	—	—	—	—		Non-album singles
"Never Gone"	2024	—	—	—	—	—	—	—	—	—	—		Wide Open, Horses
"Rent California"	2024	— (Note: "Rent California" did not enter the Irish Singles Chart but peaked at number 15 on the Irish Homegrown Top 20 chart.)	—	—	—	—	—	—	—	—	—		Non-album single
"Cowboys of Los"	2025	—	—	—	—	—	—	—	—	—	—		
"—" denotes a recording that did not chart or was not released.

==== As featured artist ====
Title	Year	Peak chart positions									Album
Title	Year	AUT	NL Tip	NOR	SCO	SWE	SWI	UK	UK Dance	US Dance	Album
"I'm in Love" (Kygo featuring James Vincent McMorrow)	2016	38	18	9	38	65	39	99	22	—	Cloud Nine
"The Future" (San Holo featuring James Vincent McMorrow)	2017	—	—	—	—	—	—	—	—	50	Non-album single
"—" denotes a recording that did not chart or was not released.

=== Songwriting and production credits ===
Title	Year	Artist	Album	Songwriter	Feature / Vocals	Producer		
Title	Year	Artist	Album	Songwriter	Feature / Vocals	Primary	Secondary	Additional
"See Yourself"	2019	Moreton	Non-album single	✓	✓			
"Just to Exist"	2018	All Tvvins	Just to Exist	✓	✓	✓		
"always on my mind"	2018	San Holo	album1	✓	✓			
"Run Away"	2017	dvsn	Morning After	✓				
"The Future"	2017	San Holo	Non-album single	✓	✓			
"I'm in Love"	2016	Kygo	Cloud Nine	✓	✓			
"Hype"	2016	Drake	Views		✓			
"Angela"	2016	dvsn	5 Sept.	✓	✓			
