= What's the Time Mr Wolf? (album) =

Studio album by Noisettes
- Released: 5 February 2007 (UK)
- Recorded: 2005–2006: London, England, UK; California, U.S.
- Genres: Indie rock; rock; soul
- Length: 38:30
- Labels: Vertigo; Mercury; Universal
- Producers: Noisettes; Clif Norrell; Dave Eve; Sam Williams

Noisettes chronology
| What's the Time Mr Wolf? (2007) | Wild Young Hearts (2009) |

What's the Time Mr Wolf? is the debut album by Noisettes. It was released on 5 February 2007 in the United Kingdom on Vertigo Records (supported by an extensive UK tour) and on 17 April 2007 in the United States on Universal Records. Five singles were released from the album: "IWE", "Scratch Your Name", "Don't Give Up", "Sister Rosetta (Capture The Spirit)", and "The Count of Monte Christo". The album was recorded over a period of two years, in various studios in Croydon, England and in Los Angeles and Sausalito, California. It peaked at #75 on the UK Albums Chart.

== Track listing ==
| No. | Title | Writer(s) | Length |
|---|---|---|---|
| 1. | "Don't Give Up" | Shingai Shoniwa, Dan Smith, Jamie Morrison | 2:31 |
| 2. | "Scratch Your Name" | Shoniwa, Smith, Morrison | 3:11 |
| 3. | "The Count of Monte Christo" | Shoniwa, Smith, Morrison | 4:14 |
| 4. | "Sister Rosetta" | Shoniwa, Smith, Morrison | 2:56 |
| 5. | "Bridge to Canada" | Shoniwa, Smith, Morrison | 3:25 |
| 6. | "IWE" | Shoniwa, Smith, Morrison | 3:30 |
| 7. | "Nothing to Dread" | Shoniwa, Smith, Morrison | 2:49 |
| 8. | "Mind the Gap" | Shoniwa, Smith | 3:44 |
| 9. | "Cannot Even (Break Free)" | Shoniwa | 4:08 |
| 10. | "Hierarchy" | Shoniwa, Smith | 4:18 |
| 11. | "Never Fall In Love Again (hidden track)" | Shoniwa, Smith, Morrison | 3:27 |

Japanese bonus tracks
| No. | Title | Writer(s) | Length |
|---|---|---|---|
| 12. | "Speedhorn" | Shoniwa, Smith, Morrison | 4:39 |
| 13. | "What Kind of Model" | Shingai Shoniwa, Dan Smith, Jamie Morrison | 3:30 |

== Critical response ==
Professional ratings
Review scores
| Source | Rating |
|---|---|
| Allmusic | 4/5 stars |
| Drowned In Sound | 4/5 stars |
| Gigwise | 4/5 stars |
| The Guardian | 4/5 stars |
| Pitchfork Media | (5.7/10) |
| PopMatters | (7/10) |

New Yorker called the album "a smart, relentlessly exuberant thirty-eight-minute demonstration of chutzpah and musicianship, despite the band's affinity with the fizzy amateur energy of punk." Rolling Stone called the band on this album "three bad-news London kids who came to knock you out, take your money and blow your mind," and gave the album three-and-a-half stars. Entertainment Weekly said that Shoniwa's "show-offy noodling derails the last few cuts, but when the Noisettes connect, they're a euphoric mix of Bow Wow Wow and the Yeah Yeah Yeahs."
