= Noisettes =

English indie rock band

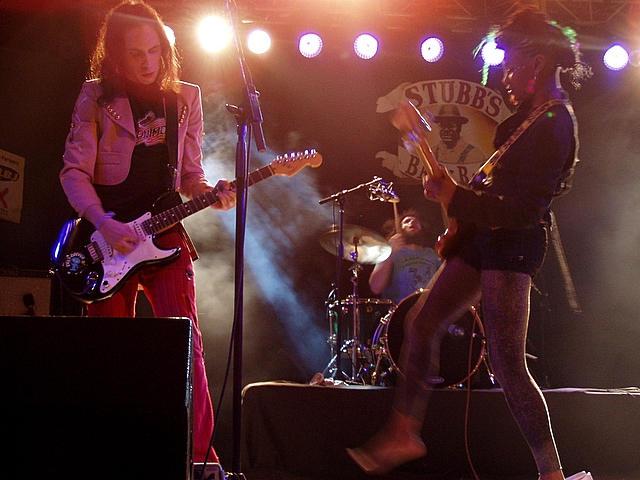
- Noisettes performing at Stubbs BBQ SXSW in 2006

Background information
- Origin: London, England
- Genres: Indie rock; pop; pop punk
- Years active: 2003–present
- Label: Vertigo
- Members: Shingai Shoniwa; Dan Smith
- Past members: Jamie Morrison
- Website: noisettes.co.uk

Noisettes are an English indie rock band from London, currently composed of singer and bassist Shingai Shoniwa and guitarist Dan Smith. The band first achieved commercial success and nationwide recognition with the second single of their second album, "Don't Upset the Rhythm (Go Baby Go)" which reached number two on the UK Singles Chart in 2009.

== History ==
=== 2003–2009: Formation and What's the Time Mr Wolf? ===
The band formed in 2003 when guitarist Smith and singer Shoniwa were attending the BRIT School for Performing Arts & Technology in Croydon, both of whom had previously been in the band Sonarfly. Drummer Jamie Morrison (formerly of Living With Eating Disorders, Willis, Six Toes, Jaywalk Buzz, Loden Jumbo and others) was recruited after Smith saw him performing on the UK television show 'Later... with Jools Holland' with his then band, Willis. The Noisettes gradually formed a reputation for being one of the rowdiest live acts in London.

Early feedback about the band was largely positive. Entertainment Weekly placed the band on its November 2005 list of "Six Indie Brit Bands on the Cusp," and said the band "sound[s] like high-drama, heavily syncopated swagger-and-sway rock, spearheaded by incandescent frontwoman Shingai Shoniwa." In a March 2006 article on UK bands, USA Today said, "The incendiary Shingai Shoniwa leads this London blues-punk band, known for its feral and explosive live show."

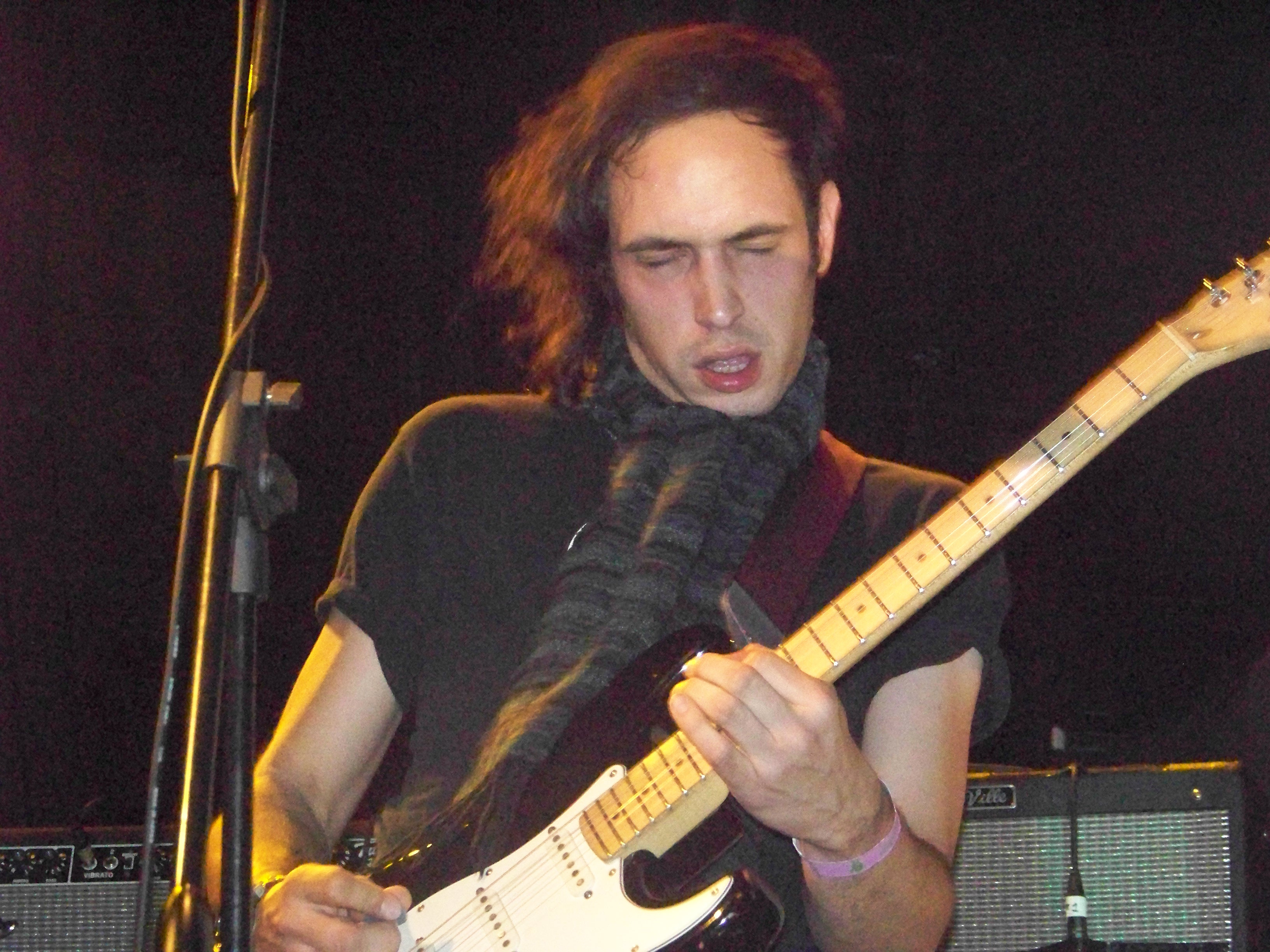
Dan Smith performing in Atlanta, 2007

Noisettes along with Paul Weller, Graham Coxon, The Smiths's Andy Rourke, and members of New Young Pony Club and Supergrass performed an exclusive rendition of a specially created track, alongside their own material, to raise money for the homelessness charity Crisis Consequences. The event was hosted at Camden's Roundhouse on 2 March 2008, and organized by Pearl Lowe. Noisettes also performed at the SXSW showcasing three of their new songs from their new album, which was released on 22 April the following year. They were part of the NME/Transgressive party at the Wave venue on 13 March 2008. The set including their hit songs "Scratch Your Name" and "Sister Rosetta", with three new songs: "Beat of My Heart", "IWE", and "Atticus". Noisettes performed at 48 hours music festival Camden Crawl on 18 April 2008.

=== 2009–2011: Wild Young Hearts ===
In January 2009, the song "Don't Upset The Rhythm" appeared on the advert for the Mazda 2. The song was the second single from their second album Wild Young Hearts which was produced by Jim Abbiss. The album was released on 20 April 2009.

On 5 February 2010, the band released the single "Saturday Night". The video for this song was shot solely on more than a hundred mobile phones. For the release of the soundtrack to the 2009 musical film Nine, they recorded a 1950s pop-style song titled "Io Bacio... Tu Baci". The Noisettes' "Never Forget You" is featured in the DFS furniture advertising campaign. In 2009, the Noisettes' song "Don't Give Up" has backed the "Bait" ad campaign by Timberland (footwear) for their "Mountain Athletic Series 2009" line-up in US, UK and Italy.

In January 2010, drummer Jamie Morrison left the band.

From February to September 2010, the Noisettes' track "Never Forget You" had been the jingle at the basis of the TV commercials and all-media marketing campaign by Vodafone in Italy. The ads featured football champion Francesco Totti and his wife Ilary Blasi acting comedy roles (project managed by the 1861 United agency). To celebrate Dr. Martens's 50th Anniversary, in April 2010 the Noisettes released a cover of "Ever Fallen in Love (With Someone You Shouldn't've)" by Buzzcocks (also a video was shot featuring Shingai Shoniwa alone). A remake of their song, "Sister Rosetta", from the album What's the Time Mr Wolf?, was redone for the soundtrack of the film The Twilight Saga: Breaking Dawn - Part 1.

=== 2012–present: Contact ===
On 25 April 2012, The Noisettes released a clip of a new song "Winner", the first official trailer single from their upcoming third album. The duo later released "That Girl" on 12 August 2012 as the lead single from the album, which peaked at number 87 on the UK Singles Chart. The album, entitled Contact, was released on 27 August 2012. It received generally positive reviews, but failed to make a commercial impact and charted 23 places lower than their previous album, peaking at number 30 on the UK Albums Chart.

In 2016, The Noisettes cover version of the 1970 R&B hit "Express Yourself", was used in a season 3 episode of the television series, The Flash. The Noisettes continued performing live, appearing at the Smoked & Uncut festival in Brockenhurst in June 2018 and at the Skopje Unplugged festival in North Macedonia in May 2019.

In 2019, Shoniwa released her debut solo EP Ancient Futures. In 2020, Shoniwa released her debut solo album, Too Bold through her independent label, Zimtron Records. Shoniwa continued her solo career and was billed as a headliner at the Ben & Jerry's Sundaes in the Park festival at Chiswick House and Gardens in London in July 2024. Guitarist Dan Smith also continued working on other projects, collaborating with Marcus Malone on the 2024 single Hurt Walks Out the Door.

== Tours and appearances ==
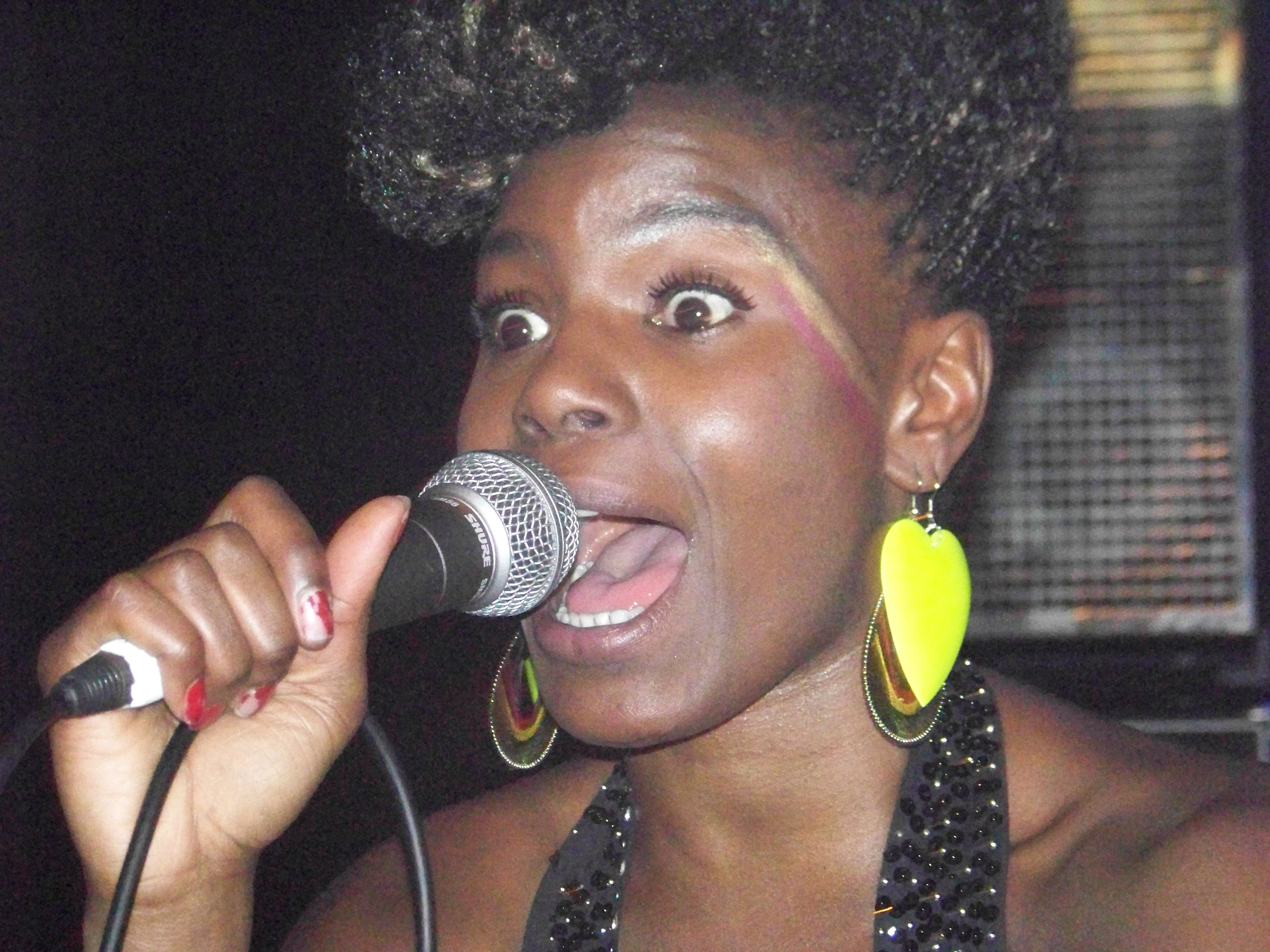
Shingai Shoniwa performing in Atlanta, 2007

Noisettes have toured Europe and the United States extensively, with TV on the Radio, Tom Vek, Babyshambles, Bloc Party, the Mystery Jets, Muse and Lady Gaga.

Noisettes toured the UK to promote the release of their debut album What's the Time Mr Wolf? in February 2007. The band undertook a UK tour prior to the release of Wild Young Hearts, and took the unusual step of using their Myspace blog to appeal for local bands to appear as support acts on this tour. These included Paul Dixon in Manchester, This Beautiful Thief in Birmingham, Emily Breeze in Bristol, Young Fathers, Jack Butcher in Glasgow and I Am A Cult Hero in Dublin.

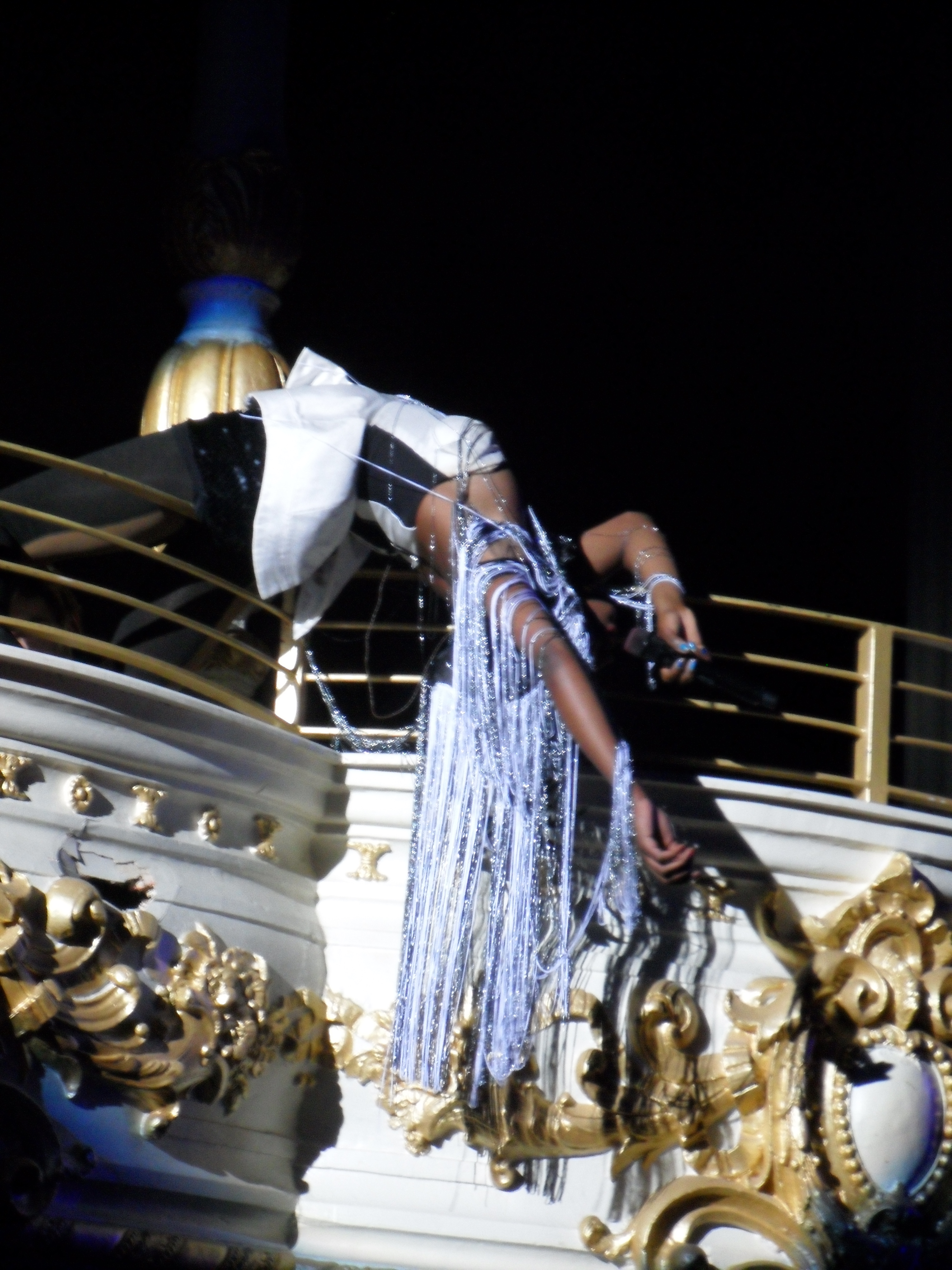
Shingai Shoniwa performing in Bournemouth, UK, 2010

Noisettes have also appeared at festivals including Coachella festival, Reading and Leeds Festivals, Detour Music Festival (all in 2007), Isle of Wight Festival, Wireless, and Glastonbury Festival (2009), Cornbury Festival, Vintage and the Lake of Stars festival in Mangochi, Malawi (2010), Get Loaded In The Park, Glastonbury Festival, Summer Well festival in Romania, V Festival (2011), and Alex James' The Big Feastival (2012). As part of the 2012 London Olympic celebrations, the band played at Hyde Park in London on 9 August 2012. On 2 May 2013, the band also performed at the 2013 edition of the Harare International Festival of the Arts (HIFA) in Harare, Zimbabwe. They featured on 4 May 2013 at the Cheltenham Jazz Festival, England.

Shingai Shoniwa has provided backing vocals for many bands including Guillemots songs "Made Up Love Song#43" and "Over the Stairs" as well as "Sunshine" by Afrikan Boy.

== Discography ==
Studio albums

- What's the Time Mr Wolf? (2007)
- Wild Young Hearts (2009)
- Contact (2012)
