= Nigel Stonier =

- Born: 10 December 1956 (age 69)
- Origin: North West England
- Genres: Rock, pop, folk
- Occupations: Musician, singer-songwriter, record producer
- Instruments: Vocals, guitar, piano
- Website: nigelstonier.co.uk

Nigel Stonier (born 10 December 1956) is an English rock, roots and pop record producer, songwriter and multi-instrumentalist.

== Biography ==
He was born in Cheshire, but first relocated to London when, at the age of 17 he secured a publishing deal with Southern music, and recorded his first demos produced by Dave Cousins of Strawbs, and with arrangements by Robert Kirby, famed for his work with Nick Drake.

Stonier's first official releases were with Northern Sky, with whom he was the rhythm guitarist, and co-writer of their 1980s track, "I Wanna Be With You". However, it was as a producer/collaborator that he eventually came to major recognition.

He has produced and written material for a long line of British acts, including Fairport Convention (whose latter-day anthem The Wood and the Wire he composed with Chris Leslie), Lindisfarne, Paul Young of Mike + The Mechanics and Sandi Thom. He has also collaborated with such UK roots-rock luminaries as Mike Scott of the Waterboys, Kathryn Tickell, Chris While and Rod Clements. It was with Clements that Stonier co-wrote "Can't Do Right For Doing Wrong", a top 40 hit in 2003 for pop singer Erin Rocha. He has produced both of Clements solo albums Stamping Ground and Odd Man Out.

In the mid-1990s, Stonier met and began working with Oxfordshire-born singer-songwriter Thea Gilmore. He produced sixteen of her albums and toured extensively in the UK and US as her guitarist.

In 2006, a song composed by Stonier and Clare Teal ("Messin' With Fire") was featured on the soundtrack of the hit British comedy movie Confetti, performed by Teal. In 2019 the song was chosen by Toyota to feature on their TV advertising campaign across the US and South America. Stonier further collaborated with Teal on material for her 2007 album Paradisi Carousel.

Also in 2006, Stonier joined Martha Wainwright onstage at the Bloomsbury Theatre in London. One of several UK artists guesting on the show, Stonier hooked up with Wainwright for a performance of her song "Who Was I Kidding".

In 2009, Stonier co-wrote and produced Thea Gilmore's "That'll Be Christmas"; the most heavily played new seasonal song on BBC Radio 2 that year. It was also the first of several tracks Stonier co-wrote with Gilmore over the next five years which all made the 'A' list at Radio 2, others including "You're The Radio", "Live Out Loud", "Start As We Mean To Go On" and "Love Came Looking For Me". The last of these was chosen as Radio 2's single of the week in May 2013 and the spearhead for Thea Gilmore's first UK top 40 album Regardless.

Stonier also joined Gilmore on a project commissioned by Island Records to create completed songs from unfinished manuscripts left by the late singer-songwriter, Sandy Denny. The resulting album Don't Stop Singing yielded the song "London", co-written by Stonier, which was adopted by BBC TV for usage during their coverage of the 2012 Summer Olympics. On 2015's Ghosts And Graffiti collection, Stonier worked with artists including Billy Bragg, The Waterboys and Joan Baez on new versions of Thea Gilmore songs. The album hit the top 40 in the UK Albums Chart in May of that year.

Stonier has in recent years also produced debut albums for a number of artists, and secured the first national airplay for a diverse range of acts including Yorkshire based band Katy Lied (2008), Cambridge born singer/songwriter Tracey Browne (2013) and award-winning young UK folk singer Kelly Oliver (2014).

In 2014, Stonier released his fifth solo album Built For Storms, which included the track "I Hope I Always", which received extensive BBC Radio 2 airplay and led to performing a live session on Clare Balding's Good Morning Sunday show in September 2014. The track was described by several BBC Radio 2 presenters as "one of the songs of the year". The album was also notable for featuring a guest appearance on violin by Stonier's older son Egan, then aged just 7. Egan has played on both subsequent solo albums released. The follow-up album Love And Work was released in February 2017 and again achieved BBC Radio 2 airplay and a 4 star review in Mojo magazine.

In 2015, he produced the comeback album from Welsh band Songdog, Joy Street; the first single from this "It's Not A Love Thing" received airplay on both BBC Radio 6 Music and BBC Radio 2.

In early 2016, Stonier collaborated with Robert Plant, Gretchen Peters, Rosanne Cash and Mary Gauthier on a track to commemorate the 70th birthday of the TV and radio presenter Bob Harris.

In January 2019 Stonier released "Navigate" which also received a 4 Star review in Mojo Magazine and widespread critical acclaim. During the same year "The New Tin Drum", a song co-written by Stonier was featured in the art-house film Bait which won several awards at The Stockholm International Film Festival and the British Academy Film Awards.

In 2019, Stonier began working on producing The Far North's debut album Songs For Gentle Souls. This garnered the band their first BBC 6 Music airplay.

In 2020 Stonier worked with Mark Knopfler, Richard Thompson, Rick Wakeman, John Oates and other celebrated musicians on a remake of the classic Stand By Me, to raise funds for Help Musicians, the online fund established to support musicians affected by the global pandemic.

Stonier is an artistic director and curator of the annual music, poetry and literature event, Words and Music Festival, in Nantwich, Cheshire. This is now entering its sixteenth year and sister-festival, Nantwich Roots, has also been established.

=== Marriage ===
Stonier and Thea Gilmore were married until their separation in early 2019 and subsequent divorce in 2021.

== Discography ==
Stonier has released six solo albums and one compilation.

- Golden Coins for the Holy Kid (1995)
- English Ghosts (2000)
- Brimstone and Blue (2003)
- Don't Sing Love Songs... ...You'll Wake My Mother (2006 compilation)
- Notes from Overground (2010)
- Built for Storms (2014)
- Love and Work (2017)
- Navigate (2019)
- Wolf Notes (2025)
