= Island Records discography =

Record label discography

The history and the discography of the Island Records label can conveniently be divided into three phases:

- The Jamaican Years, covering the label's releases from 1959 to 1966
- The New Ground Years, covering 1967 to approximately 1980.
- The Consolidation Years, covering 1980 onwards. In 1989, Chris Blackwell sold Island Records to PolyGram, resulting in a remarketing of the Island back catalogue on compact disc under the Island Masters brand.

== Jamaican releases (1959–1962) ==
Blackwell released 32 singles and four LPs in this period.

=== Jamaican singles ===
The very first records were issued on 7" 45rpm sides in Jamaica on a label simply called 'R & B'...

- No number – The Caribs: "Taboo" / "Matilda Cha Cha" (matrix: GRC.5725A/5725B; also issued on Starlite ST.45 012), June 1960
- 002 – Laurel Aitken: "Boogie In My Bones" / "Little Sheila" (matrix: GRC.5935A/5935B; also issued on Starlite ST.45 011), March 1960
- 006 – Laurel Aitken with the Caribs: "Honey Girl" / "Drinkin' Whisky" (matrix: GRC.6012A/6012B; also issued on Starlite ST.45 014), August 1960
- 007 – Lord Lebby with the Caribs: "One Kiss For My Baby" / "Caldonia" (matrix: IRB-6A/6B; also issued on Starlite ST.45 018), October 1960
- 008 – Wilfred "Jackie" Edwards and the Caribs: "We're Gonna Love" / "Your Eyes Are Dreaming" (matrix: GRC.6017A/6017B; also issued on Starlite ST.45 016), September 1960 (on red vinyl)
- 009 – Owen Gray and the Caribs: "Far Love" / "Please Let Me Go" (matrix: GRC.6018A/6018B; also issued on Starlite ST.45 015), August 1960
- 010 – The Champs: "Too Much Tequila" / "Chariot Rock", 1960 (Licensed from Challenge Records)
- 011 – The Jiving Juniors: "Tu-Woo-Up-Tu-Woo" / "Lovers Line" (matrix: IRB-9A/9B; also issued on Starlite ST.45 028), December 1960
- 012 – Charlie Babcock: "I Have a Feeling" / "Baby Baby Baby" (matrix: GRC.6140A/6140B), 1960
- 016 – Earl Hooker: "Do the Chicken" / "Yea Yea", 1960 (Licensed from C.J. Records)
- 017 – Wilfred "Jackie" Edwards and the Caribs: "I Know" / "Tell Me Darling" (matrix: IRB-8A/8B; also issued on Starlite ST.45 026), December 1960
- 018 – The Jiving Juniors and the Caribs: "Slop 'N' Mash" / "My Sweet Angel" (matrix: IRB-15A/15B; also issued on Starlite ST.45 049), July 1961
- 019 – Owen Gray (featuring Ernest Ranglin – Guitar): "The Plea" / "Jenny Lee" (matrix: IRB-7A/7B; also issued on Starlite ST.45 019), October 1960
- 021 – The Downbeats: "Thinkin' of You" / "Midnite Love" (matrix: IRB-16A/16B; also issued on Starlite ST.45 051), July 1961
- 022 – Owen Gray and the Caribs: "Mash It, Pt. 1" / "Mash It, Pt. 2" (matrix: IRB-11A/11B; also issued on Starlite ST.45 032), January 1961
- 023 – The Blues Busters: "The Spiritual (Jesus Is In My Soul)" / "Lost My Baby" (matrix: IRB-10A/10B; also issued on Starlite ST.45 031), January 1961
- No number – Teddy Brown: "Pretty Little Baby" / "Genevieve (Jenny V)" (matrix: IRB-12A/12B; also issued on Starlite ST.45 033), January 1961
- No number – Wilfred "Jackie" Edwards: "Whenever There's Moonlight" / "Heaven Just Knows" (matrix: IRB-13A/13B; also issued on Starlite ST.45 046), June 1961
- 027 – Keith and Enid: "It's Only a Pity" / "Never Leave My Throne" (matrix: IRB-14A/14B; also issued on Starlite ST.45 047), June 1961
- 028 – The Rhythm Aces with the Caribs: "Wherever You May Go" / "A Thousand Teardrops" (matrix: IRB-23A/23B; also issued on Starlite ST.45 061), November 1961
- No number – Wilfred "Jackie" Edwards: "More Than Words Can Say" / "I Love You No More" (matrix: IRB-24A/24B; also issued on Starlite ST.45 062), November 1961
- 035 – The Blues Busters: "You Send Me Crazy" / "Your Love" (matrix: IRB-18A/18B; also issued on Starlite ST.45 072), January 1962
- 037 – A. [Audley] Williams: "Grisby" / "Clint's Theme", 1961
- 040 – Keith and Enid: "What Have I Done" / "You're Gonna Break My Heart" (matrix: IRB-17A/17B; also issued on Starlite ST.45 067), December 1961
- 041 – The Rhythm Aces: "C-H-R-I-S-T-M-A-S" / "Please Don't Go Away", 1961
- No number – The Rhythm Aces: "Oh My Darling" / "Please Don't Go Away" (matrix: IRB-19A/19B; also issued on Starlite ST.45 066), December 1961
- No number – Wilfred "Jackie" Edwards: "Never Go Away" / "Little Bitty Girl" (matrix: IRB-25A/25B; also issued on Starlite ST.45 076), February 1962
- No number – Owen Gray: "I Feel Good" / "Someone To Help Me" (matrix: IRB-26A/26B; also issued on Starlite ST.45 078), March 1962
- No number – Owen Gray: "Let Me Go Free" / "In My Dreams" (matrix: IRB-27A/27B; also issued on Starlite ST.45 088), October 1962
- No number – Rico's Combo (Rico Rodriguez): "London Here I Come" / "Midnight In Ethiopia" (matrix: PLA-12/PLA-13), 1962
- No number – The Champs: "Tequila Twist" / "Limbo Rock", 1962 (Licensed from Challenge Records)
- 1001 – Jim Hawthorn: "Gaucho" / "Walkin' To New Orleans", 1960 (Licensed from Bingo Records)

=== Jamaican LPs ===
CB stands for Chris Blackwell; 21 for the age of Blackwell at that time; this is the first number in the LP catalogue series.

- CB 21 – Lance Hayward: Lance Hayward at the Half Moon Hotel, 1959
- CB 22 – Lance Hayward: Lance Hayward at the Half Moon Hotel, Volume 2, 1960
- CB 23 – Ernest Ranglin Trio: Guitar In Ernest, 1961
- CB LP 24 – Owen Gray: Sings, 1961

== UK releases 1960s ==
After the company's start in London in 1962, Island Records diversified already in 1963 into various labels: Black Swan, Island, Sue, and Jump Up.

=== Singles of the 1960s ===
The first Island "white and red" label was used mainly for Jamaican productions released in the United Kingdom. Catalogue numbers started at WI-001. Many of these records had been released previously in Jamaica and other territories on small local labels. For a variety of reasons details of the artists and songs printed on the labels do not always match what is actually to be found in the grooves of the record! The main Island label was soon joined by another three labels: Sue for black American music with catalogue numbers starting at WI-300, Black Swan for more Jamaican music starting with WI-400, and Jump Up, for Calypso and Trinidadian music, starting with 500, but using another prefix (JU). The Aladdin label was started in about 1965 and used numbers starting with 600, using the WI prefix.

==== Island (white and red label) ====
Island singles were released with prefix WI and numbers starting with 001. The Island label itself was white with red lettering and logotypes – for the first 100 releases it had a round "Flaming sun" logo on a white label, then and for reprints of the early issues a red strip across the centre of the label like a "bow tie". The labels have the Rutland Gate Mews address on all first pressings up until about number 14; this was followed by the London England address which goes up to at least # 47, then came Cambridge Road.

(N.B. This discography has been expanded and corrected using the published discography in "Record Collector" magazine 201, published May 1996. Details can also be checked online, at the "45cat" database, which contains many label scans. As far as possible, the listings below reflect what is actually written on the record label. Known variations or labelling errors are given in brackets after the entry.)

- WI 001 – Lord Creator: "Independent Jamaica" (later expanded to "Independent Jamaica Calypso" and later still corrected to "Independent Jamaica Calypso") b/w "Remember", 14/6/1962 (B-side actually titled "Remember Your Mother & Father"; a version released to celebrate the 1st Anniversary of Jamaican independence had the full title on the label.)
- WI 002 – Owen Gray: "Patricia" b/w "Twist Baby", 14/6/1962
- WI 003 – The Jiving Juniors: "Sugar Dandy" b/w "Valerie", 1962;
- WI 004 – Derrick Morgan: "Travel On" b/w "Teach Me Baby", 1962
- WI 005 – Roy and Millie: "We'll Meet" b/w Roland Alphonso: "Back Beat", 1962 (B-side is with uncredited City Slickers); Collectable Records.ru
- WI 006 – Derrick Morgan: "The Hop" b/w "Tell It To Me", 1962
- WI 007 – Lloyd Clarke: "Love You The Most" b/w Lloyd Robinson: "You Said You Loved Me", 1962
- WI 008 – Wilfred Jackie Edwards: "All My Days" b/w "Hear Me Cry", 1962
- WI 009 – Alton and Eddy: "Let Me Dream" b/w "My Love Divine", 1962
- WI 010 – The Continentals: "Give Me All Your Love" b/w "Going Crazy", 1962
- WI 011 – Derrick Morgan: "Forward March" b/w "Please Don't Talk About Me", 1962 (B-side act. with Eric Morris); Collectable Records.ru
- WI 012 – Jimmy Cliff: "Hurricane Hatty" b/w "Dearest Beverley", 1962
- WI 013 – Derrick Morgan: "See The Blind" b/w "Cherry Home", 1962
- WI 014 – Owen Gray: "Jezebel" b/w Owen & Millie: "Sugar Plum", 1962
- WI 015 – Ernest Ranglin Orchestra: "Harmonica Twist" b/w "Nitty Gritty", 1962
- WI 016 – Jimmy Cliff: "Miss Jamaica" b/w "Gold Digger", 1962
- WI 017 – Errol Dixon: "Morning Train" b/w "Lonely Heart", 1962
- WI 018 – Derrick & Patsy: "Housewife's Choice" b/w "Gypsy Woman", 1962
- WI 019 – Wilfred Jackie Edwards: "One More Week" b/w "Tears Like Rain", 1962
- WI 020 – Owen Gray with Ernest Rauglin (sic.) Orchestra: "Audrey" b/w Owen Gray: "Dolly Baby", 1962
- WI 021 – Don Drummond Orchestra: "Schooling The Duke" b/w "Bitter Rose", 1962 (B-side act. Shenley Duffas)
- WI 022 – Emanuel Rodrigues Ork.: "Rico Special" b/w Bunny & Skitter: "A Little Mashin'", 1962
- WI 023 – The Blues Busters: "Behold!" b/w "Oh! Baby", 1962
- WI 024 – Martin & Derrick: "Come On" b/w Monty & the Cyclones: "Organisation", 1962
- WI 025 – Jimmy Cliff: "Since Lately" b/w "I'm Free", 1962
- WI 026 – Theo Beckford: "I Don't Want You" (actually by King Edwards All Stars) b/w "Seven Long Years", 1962
- WI 027 – The Jiving Juniors: "Andrea" b/w "Don't Leave Me", 1962
- WI 028 – Bobby Aitken: "Baby Baby" (actually with Patsy) b/w "Lonely Boy", 1962
- WI 029 – The Hi-Tones: "Going Steady" b/w "Darlin' Elaine", 1962
- WI 030 – Owen Gray: "Midnight Track" b/w "Time Will Tell", 1962;
- WI 031 – Wilbert Harrison: "Off To School" b/w "I'm Broke", 1962
- WI 032 – The Rhythm Aces: "C-H-R-I-S-T-M-A-S" b/w Top Grant: "A Christmas Drink", 1962
- WI 033 – Basil Gabbidon: "I Found My Baby" (actually by Roy Braham) b/w "No Fault Of Mine", 1962
- WI 034 – Top Grant: "Searchin' (For You)" b/w "David And Goliath", 1963
- WI 035 – The Vikings: "Maggie Don't Leave Me" b/w "Henchman" (both actually with Victor Wong), 1963 (The Vikings are actually The Maytals)
- WI 036 – Shenley Duffas: "Give To Get" b/w Shenley & Millie: "What You Gonna Do", 1963;
- WI 037 – Derrick Morgan: "Dorothy" b/w "Leave Her Alone", 1963
- WI 038 – Lascelles Perkins & Yvonne: "Tango Lips" b/w Dennis Sindrey: "Rub Up" (B-side actually plays "Jamaica's Song"), 1963
- WI 039 – Cornell Campbell: "Rosabelle" b/w "Turndown Date" (B-side act. "Under The Old Oak Tree"), 1963
- WI 040 – King Edwards (Group): "Dear Hearts" b/w "Oh Mary" (b-side actually by Ransford Barnett), 1963
- WI 041 – John Holt: "I Cried A Tear" b/w "Forever I'll Stay", 1963
- WI 042 – Jackie Estick: "Since You've Been Gone" b/w "Daisy I Love You", 1963
- WI 043 – The Moonlighters: "Going Out" b/w "Hold My Hands", 1963
- WI 044 – Clancy Eccles: "Judgement" b/w Clancy & Paulette: "Baby Please", 1962
- WI 045 – Lloyd Clarke: "Japanese Girl" b/w "He's Coming", 1963
- WI 046 – Kent & Dimples: "Day Is Done" b/w "Linger A While", 1963
- WI 047 – King Edwards: "Russian Roulette" (actually by King Edwards All Stars) b/w "You're Mine" (B-side actually by Douglas Brothers), 1963
- WI 048 – Owen Gray: "I'm Still Waiting" b/w "Last Night", 1963
- WI 049 – The Melody Enchanters: "Enchanter's Ball" b/w "I'll Be True", 1963
- WI 050 – Roy & Millie: "This World" b/w "Never Say Goodbye", 1963
- WI 051 – Derrick Morgan: "Blazing Fire" b/w Derrick & Patsy: "I'm In A Jam", 1963
- WI 052 – Top Grant: "Suzie" b/w "Jenny", 1963
- WI 053 – Derrick Morgan: "No Raise, No Praise" b/w "Loving Baby", 1963
- WI 054 – Desmond Dekker & Beverleys All Stars: "Madgie" b/w Desmond Dekker: "Honour Your Mother And Father", 1963
- WI 055 – Derrick & Patsy: "Sea Wave" b/w "Look Before You Leap", 1963
- WI 056 – Andy & Joey: "Have You Ever" b/w "Cross My Heart", 1963
- WI 057 – Adam Smith: "I Wonder Why" b/w "My Prayer", 1963 (Adam Smith was a pseudonym for Eric Smith)
- WI 058 – Frank Cosmo: "Revenge" b/w "Laughin' At You" (B-side actually with Bobby Aitken), 1963
- WI 059 – Tony & Louise: "Ups And Downs" b/w Tony Tomas: "Brixton Lewisham", 1963
- WI 060 – The Richard Brothers: "I Need A Girl" b/w "Desperate Lover", 1963
- WI 061 – Charley Tabor: "Blue Atlantic" b/w "Red Lion Madison", 1963
- WI 062 – Jimmy Cliff: "My Lucky Day" b/w "One-Eyed Jacks", 1963
- WI 063 – Shenley Duffas: "Fret Man Fret" b/w "Doreen", 1963
- WI 064 – The Tonettes: "Love That Is Real" b/w "Pretty Baby", 1963
- WI 065 – The Vikings: "Hallelujah!" b/w "Helpin' Ages" (actually by The Maytals), 1963
- WI 066 – Kentrick Patrick: "Man To Man" b/w Roland Alfonso: "Blockade", 1963
- WI 067 – Roy & Paulette: "Have You Seen My Baby" b/w "Since You're Gone", 1963
- WI 068 – Tony Washington: "Something Gotta Be Done" b/w Tony & Louise: "I Have Said", 1963
- WI 069 – Errol Dixon: "I Love You" b/w "Tell Me More", 1963
- WI 070 – Jimmy Cliff: "King Of Kings" b/w Sir Percy: "Oh Yeah", 1963
- WI 071 – The Afro Enchanters: "Peace And Love" b/w "Wayward African", 1963
- WI 072 – Top-Grant: "Riverbank Coberley" b/w "Nancy", 1963
- WI 073 – Frank Cosmo: "Dear Dreams" b/w "Go Go Go", 1963
- WI 074 – Top Grant: "Money Money Money" b/w "Have Mercy On Me", 1963
- WI 075 – The Vikings: "Six And Seven Books Of Moses" b/w "Zacions" (actually by The Maytals), 1963
- WI 076 – Basil Gabbidon: "I Bet You Don't Know" b/w Shenley Duffas: "Three Times Seven", 1963
- WI 077 – Top Grant: "War In Africa" b/w "The Birds", 1963
- WI 078 – The Blues Masters: "5 O'Clock Whistle" b/w "African Blood" (both actually by Baba Brooks & His Band), 1963
- WI 079 – Kentrick Patrick: "Don't Stay Out Late" b/w "Forever And Ever", 1963
- WI 080 – Derrick Morgan: "Angel With Blue Eyes" b/w "Corner Stone", 1963
- WI 081 – Higgs & Wilson: "Last Saturday Morning" b/w "Praise The Lord", 1963
- WI 082 – Edwards Grp: "He Gave You To Me" b/w "Kings Priests & Prophets" (both actually by The Schoolboys), 1963
- WI 083 – Cornell Campbell: "Each Lonely Night" b/w Roland Alphonso: "Steamline", 1963
- WI 084 – Duke White: "It's Over" b/w "Forever", 1963
- WI 085 – Drumbago: "I Am Drunk" (actually by Raymond Harper & Drumbago's Group) b/w "Sea Breeze" (actually by Sammy & Drumbago's Group), 1963
- WI 086 – The Hi-Tones: "Ten Virgins" (actually by The Angelic Brothers) b/w "Too Young To Love" (actually by Larry Marshall), 1963
- WI 087 – King Edwards: "Hey Girl" b/w "Skies Are Grey" (both actually by Ransford Barnett), 1963
- WI 088 – Robert Marley: "Judge Not" b/w "Do You Still Love Me", 1963
- WI 089 – Basil Gabbidon: "St. Louis Woman" b/w "Get On The Ball", 1963
- WI 090 – Roy and Millie: "There'll Come A Day" b/w "I Don't Want You", 1963; Collectable Records.ru
- WI 091 – Larry Lawrence: "Garden Of Eden" b/w Derrick Morgan: "Sendin' This Message", 1963
- WI 092 – Laurel Aitken: "I Shall Remove" b/w "We Got To Move", 1963
- WI 093 – Shenley Duffus: "What A Disaster" b/w "I Am Rich", 1963
- WI 094 – Don Drummond: "Scandal" b/w "My Ideal" (B-side actually by W. Sparks), 1963
- WI 095 – Laurel Aitken: "What A Weeping" b/w "Zion City Wall", 1963
- WI 096 – Baba Brooks: "Bank To Bank, Pt. 1" b/w "Bank To Bank, Pt. 2", 1963;
- WI 097 – Delroy Wilson: "I Shall Not Remove" b/w "Naughty People", 1963
- WI 098 – Clancy Eccles: "Glory Halleluja" b/w "Hot Rod" (B-side actually by Roland Alphonso), 1963
- WI 099 – Laurel Aitken: "In My Soul" b/w "One More River To Cross", 1963
- WI 100 – Frank Cosmo: "Merry Christmas" b/w Greetings From Beverley's, 1963
- WI 101 – The Vikings: "Never Grow Old" b/w "Irene" (actually by The Maytals), 1963
- WI 102 – Tommy McCook: "Adams Apple" b/w The Maytals: "Every Time" (B-side actually by The Tonettes), Tapir's, 1963
- WI 103 – Delroy Wilson: "One, Two, Three" b/w "Back Biter", 1963
- WI 104 – Kentrick Patrick: "The End Of The World" b/w "Little Princess", 1963
- WI 105 – Creator and Norma: "We Will be Lovers" b/w "Come On Pretty Baby", 1963
- WI 106 – Theo Beckford: "Boller Man" b/w "Daphney", 1963
- WI 107 – The Vikings: "Just Got To Be" b/w "You Make Me Do" (actually by The Maytals), 1963
- WI 108 – Tanamo: "Come Down" b/w "I Am Holding On" (white+red label), 1964;
- WI 109 – Richard Bros: "I Shall Wear A Crown" b/w Baba Brooks: "Robin Hood", 1963
- WI 110 – Stranger Cole: "Stranger at the Door" b/w "Conqueror", 1963
- WI 111 – Desmond Dekker: "Parents" b/w "Labour For Learning" (white+red label), 1963;
- WI 112 – Jimmy Cliff: "Miss Universe" b/w "The Prodigal", 1963
- WI 113 – Stranger & Patsy: "Senor and Senorita" b/w Don Drummond: "Snowboy", 1963
- WI 114 – Stranger Cole: "Last Love" b/w Stranger & Ken: "Hush Baby", 1963
- WI 115 – Shenley Duffas: "Know The Lord" b/w Tommy McCook: "Ska Ba", 1963
- WI 116 – Delroy Wilson: "You Bend My Love" b/w "Can't You See", 1963
- WI 117 – The Vikings: "Fever" b/w "Cheer Up" (actually by The Maytals), 1963
- WI 118 – Tommy McCook: "Below Zero" b/w Lee Perry: "Never Get Weary", 1963
- WI 119 – Kentrick Patrick: "Golden Love" b/w "Beyond", 1963
- WI 120 – Paulette & Delroy: "Little Lover" b/w "Lovin' Baby" (white+red label), 1963;
- WI 121 – Lester Sterling: "Clean The City" b/w "Long Walk Home" (B-side actually by The Charmers), 1963
- WI 122 – Bonnie & Skitto: "Get Ready" (actually by The Vikings, alias The Maytals) b/w Don Drummond: "The Rocket", 1963
- WI 123 – Horace Sexton: "I'm So Glad" b/w "Tell Me", 1963
- WI 124 – Tommy McCook: "Junior Jive" b/w Horace Seaton: "Power", 1963
- WI 125 – Shenley Duffas: "Easy Squeal" b/w "Things Aren't Going Right", 1963
- WI 126 – Stranger Cole: "We Are Rolling" b/w "Millie Maw", 1963
- WI 127 – Baba Brooks: "Three Blind Mice" b/w Billy & Bobby: "We Ain't Got Nothing", 1963
- WI 128 – Ernest Ranglin: "Exodus" b/w Robert Marley: "One Cup Of Coffee", 1963
- WI 129 – The Jiving Juniors: "Sugar Dandy" b/w "Valerie", 1963 (reissue)
- WI 130 – The Flames: "He's The Greatest" b/w Someone Going To Bawl (both actually by The Maytals), 1964
- WI 131 – Lord Briscoe: "Praise For I" b/w "Tell You The Story", 1964
- WI 132 – Kentrick Patrick: "Take Me To The Party" b/w "I'm Sorry", 1964
- WI 133 – Stranger Cole: "Til My Dying Days" b/w Stranger & Patsy: "I Need You", 1964
- WI 134 – Sonny & Yvonne: "Life Without Fun" b/w Sonny Burke Group: "Mount Vesuvius", 1964
- WI 135 – Frank Cosmo: "Better Get Right" b/w "Ameletia", 1964
- WI 136 – The Flames: "Little Flea" b/w "Good Idea" (both actually by The Maytals), 1964
- WI 137 – Stranger Cole: "Goodbye Peggy" (actually plays "Goodbye Peggy Daring" by Roy Panton) b/w Baba Brooks: "Portrait of my Love", 1964
- WI 138 – The Flames: "When I Get Home" b/w "Neither Silver Nor Gold" (both actually by The Maytals), 1964
- WI 139 – The Flames: "Broadway Jungle" b/w "Beat Lied" (both actually by The Maytals), 1964
- WI 140 – Kentrick Patrick: "I Am Wasting Time" b/w Randy's Group: "Royal Charley", 1964
- WI 141 – Stranger & Patsy: "Oh Oh I Need You" b/w Don Drummond: "J.F.K.'s Memory", 1964
- WI 142 – Eric Morris: "Penny-Reel" b/w Duke Reid's Group: "Darling When" (actually by Dotty & Bonnie), 1964
- WI 143 – Dotty and Bonny: "Your Kisses" b/w "Why Worry" (white+red label), 1964;
- WI 144 – Stranger and Patsy: "Tom, Dick & Harry" b/w "We Two, Happy People" (white+red label), 1964;
- WI 145 – Joe White: "When Are You Young" b/w "Wanna Go Home", 1964
- WI 146 – Owen and Leon: "Next Door Neighbour" b/w Roland Alphonso: Feeling Fine, 1964;
- WI 147 – Eric Morris: "Mama No Fret" b/w Frankie Anderson: "Santa Lucia" (actually with Roland Alphonso), 1964
- WI 148 – Dotty and Bonny: "Dearest" b/w "Tears Are Falling" (white+red label), 1964;
- WI 149 – Don Drummond: "Eastern Standard Time" b/w Dotty & Bonny: "Sun Rises", 1964
- WI 150 – Eric Morris: "Drop Your Sword" b/w "Catch a Fire" (actually by Roland Alphonso), 1964
- WI 151 – Eric Morris: "What A Man Doeth" b/w Duke Reid's Group: "Rude Boy" (actually by Baba Brooks), 1964;
- WI 152 – Stranger and Patsy: "Yeah Yeah Baby" b/w Baba Brooks: "Boat Ride", 1964
- WI 153 – Don Drummond: "Musical Storeroom" b/w Stranger Cole: "He Who Feels", 1964
- WI 154 – The Charms: "Carry Go, Bring Home" (actually by Justin Hinds & the Dominoes) b/w "Hill And Gully" (actually by L. Reid's Group), 1964
- WI 155 – Sonny Burke Group: "Live And Let Live" b/w "Our Love Is True", 1964
- WI 156 – Sonny Burke: "Write Your Name" b/w "It Means So Much", 1964
- WI 157 – Derrick Harriott: "What Can I Do (The Wedding)" b/w "Leona", 1964
- WI 158 – Desmond Dekkar (sic.) & his Cherry Pies: "Jeserine" b/w "King Of Ska", 1964 (The Cherry Pies are actually The Maytals)
- WI 159 – Joe White: "Hog In A Co Co" b/w Skatalites: "Sandy Gully", 1964
- WI 160 – Stranger and Patsy: "Miss B" b/w "Thing Come To Those Who Wait", 1964
- WI 161 – The Skatalites: "Trip To Mars" b/w Dottie and Bonnie: "Bunch of Roses", 1964
- WI 162 – Don Drummond: "Garden of Love" b/w Stranger Cole: "Cherry May", 1964
- WI 163 – Owen and Leon: "My Love For You" b/w "How Many Times", 1964
- WI 164 – Owen and Leon: "The Fits Is On Me" b/w Skatalites: "Good News", 1964
- WI 165 – Owen and Leon: "Running Around" b/w Skatalites: "Around The World", 1964
- WI 166 – Joe White: "Downtown Girl" b/w The Richard Bros: "You Are My Sunshine", 1964 (b-side actually plays "Cool Smoke" by Don Drummond)
- WI 167 – The Vikings: "Daddy" b/w "It's You" (both actually by The Maytals), 1964
- WI 168 – The Skatalites: "Guns Of Navarone" (actually by Roland Alphonso and Studio One Orchestra) b/w "Marcus Garvey" (actually plays "Where's Marcus Garvey" by Bongoman Byfield), 1965 (UK #36, April 1967)
- WI 169 – Stranger Cole with Owen & Leon: "Koo Koo Doo" b/w Gloria & the Dreamletts: "Stay Where You Are", 1965
- WI 170 – Derak (sic.) Harriott: "I'm Only Human" b/w Roy Panton: "Good Man", 1965
- WI 171 – Justin Hinds and the Dominoes: "Botheration" b/w "Satan", 1965
- WI 172 – Sam Houston: "My Mother's Eyes" b/w "Danny Boy", 1965
- WI 173 – Carlos Malcolm and The Afro Caribs: "Bonanza Ska" b/w "Papa Luiga", 1965; Collectable Records.ru
- WI 174 – Justin Hinds and the Dominoes: "Jump Out Of Frying Pan" b/w "Holy Dove", 1965
- WI 175 – The Skatalites: "Dragon Weapon" b/w Desmond Dekkar and Four Aces: "It Was Only A Dream", 1965
- WI 176 – Riots: "Telling Lies" b/w "Don't Leave Me" (actually by The Techniques), 1965
- WI 177 – Stranger Cole and Baba Brooks: "Run Joe" b/w Stranger Cole: "Make Believe", 1965
- WI 178 – The Four Aces: "Hoochy-Koochy Kai-Po" b/w "River Bank Coberley Again", 1965
- WI 179 – The Four Aces: "Swing Low, Sweet Chariot" b/w "Peace and Love", 1965
- WI 180 – The Clarendonians: Day Will Come, 1965;
- WI 181 – Desmond Dekkar (sic.): "Get Up Edina" (actually with The Four Aces) b/w Patsy & Desmond: "Be Mine Forever" (B-side actually plays "Down Down Down" by Clive & Naomi), 1965;
- WI 182 – Upcoming Willows: "Jones Town Special" b/w Shenley Dutlus: "La La La", 1965
- WI 183 – Eric Morris: "Love Can Make a Mansion", 1965;
- WI 184 – Shenley Duffus: "You Are Mine" / Upcoming Willows: "Red China"
- WI 185 – Eric Morris: "Many Long Years" b/w "Suddenly", 1965
- WI 186 – Shenley Duffas: "Rukumbine" / "One Morning", 1965
- WI 187 – Lloyd Briscoe: "Jonah (The Master)" / "Mr. Cleveland"
- WI 188 – The Wailers: "It Hurts To Be Alone" / "Mr. Talkative", 1965
- WI 189 – Ruby Seedorf: "One Million Stars", 1965
- WI 190 – Wilfred and Millicent: "The Vow" / "I'll Never Believe In You"
- WI 191 – The Skatalites: "Doctor Kildare" / Roland Alphonso: "Sucu Sucu"
- WI 192 – Don Drummond and Drumbago: "Stampede" / Justin Hinds and the Dominoes: "Come Bail Me"
- WI 193 – Derrick and Naomi: "Two of a Kind" b/w Derrick Morgan: "I Want a Lover", 1965
- WI 194 – Justin Hinds & the Dominoes: "Rub Up Push Up" / "The Ark", 1965
- WI 195 – The Riots: "You Don't Know" b/w Don Drummond: "Treasure Island", 1965
- WI 196 – Virtues: "Your Wife and Your Mother" / "Amen", 1965
- WI 197 – The Riots: "I Am in Love" b/w "When You're Wrong", 1965
- WI 198 – Laurel Aitken: "Boogie in My Bones" b/w "Little Sheila" (reissue), 1965
- WI 199 – Tommy McCook and His Skatalites: "Fast Mouth" / "The Harder They Come The Harder They Fall", 1965
- WI 200 – The Maytals: "Never You Change" / "What's On Your Mind"
- WI 201 – Joe White & Chuck: "Low-Minded People" b/w Joe White: "Irene", 1965
- WI 202 – Desmond Dekker: "This Woman" b/w The Upsetters: "Si Senor", 1965
- WI 203 – Jackie Opel: "Wipe Those Tears" b/w "Don't Take Away My Love", 1965
- WI 204 – Don Drummond: "Coolie Boy" b/w Lord Antics: "You May Stray", 1965
- WI 205 – Delroy Wilson: "Pick Up the Pieces" b/w "Oppression", 1965
- WI 206 – The Wailers: "Play Boy", 1965
- WI 207 – The Skatalites: "Ball 'O' Fire" b/w Linval Spencer: "Can't Go On", 1965
- WI 208 – Don Drummond: "Man in the Street" b/w Rita and Benny: "You Are My Only Love", 1965
- WI 209 – Jackie Opel: "Go Whey" b/w "Shelter the Storm", 1965
- WI 210 – Lee Perry: "Please Don't Go" / "Bye St. Peter"
- WI 211 – Peter Touch and the Wailers: "Hoot Nanny Hoot" b/w Bob Marley and the Wailers: "Do You Remember", 1965
- WI 212 – The Wailers: "Holligan" b/w "Maga Dog", 1965
- WI 213 – The Maytals: "My New Name" / "It's No Use", 1965
- WI 214 – The Blues Busters: "How Sweet It Is" (white+red label), 1965
- WI 215 – Peter Touch and the Wailers: "Shame and Scandal" / Wailers: "The Jerk"
- WI 217 – Roland Alphonso: "El Pussy Cat"
- WI 218 – Joe Haywood: "Warm and Tender Love"
- WI 219 – Philip James and the Blues Busters: "Wide Awake in a Dream" b/w The Maytals: "Tell Me the Reason", 1965
- WI 220 – Ken Lazrus: "Funny" b/w Byron Lee Orchestra: "Walk Like a Dragon", 1965
- WI 221 – Sonny Burke: "Grandpa" b/w Keith Patterson: "Deep in My Heart", 1965
- WI 222 – The Blues Busters: "Wings of a Dove" b/w Byron Lee and the Dragonaires: "Dan is the Man", 1965
- WI 223 – The Upsetters: "Country Girl" / "Strange Country" 1965
- WI 224 – Desmond Dekker And The Four Aces: "Mount Zion", 1965
- WI 225 – Derrick Morgan: "Starvation" b/w "I Am a Blackhead", 1965
- WI 226 – The Skatalites: "Dick Tracy" b/w Rita and the Soulettes: "One More Chance", 1965
- WI 227 – The Skatalites: "Song of Love" b/w Jackie Opel: "Old Rocking Chair", 1965
- WI 228 – Bunny & Rita: "Bless You" b/w The Skatalites: "Beardman Ska", 1965
- WI 229 – Baba Brooks: "Guns Fever" b/w Dotty And Bonny: "Don't Do It", 1965
- WI 230 – Hortense & Alton: "Don't Gamble with Love" b/w Alton Ellis and the Flames: "Something You've Got", 1965
- WI 231 – Techniques: Little "Did You Know" b/w Don Drummond: "Cool Smoke"
- WI 232 – Tommy McCook: "Rocket Ship" b/w Justin Hinds: "Turn Them Back", 1965
- WI 233 – Stranger And Claudette: "Seven Days" b/w Baba Brooks: "Independence Ska", 1965
- WI 234 – Eric Morris: Children of Today b/w Baba Brooks: Greenfield Ska, 1965
- WI 235 – Baba Brooks: "Duck Soup" b/w The Zodiacs: "Renegade"
- WI 236 – Justin Hinds: "Peace And Love" b/w "Skalarama"
- WI 237 – Derrick Harriott: "My Three Loves" b/w "The Jerk"
- WI 238 – The Pioneers: "Sometimes" (white+red label), 1965
- WI 239 – Alton Ellis: "Dance Crasher" b/w Baba Brooks: "Vitamin A", 1965
- WI 240 – Two Kings: "Rolling Stone" b/w The Sufferer: "Tomorrow Morning"
- WI 241 – Baba Brooks: "Teenage Ska" b/w Alton Ellis: "You Are Not to Blame", 1965
- WI 242 – Don Drummond: "University Goes Ska" b/w Derrick & Naomi: "Pain in the Heart", 1965
- WI 243 – Theo Beckford: "You Are the One Girl" b/w "Grudgeful People", 1965
- WI 244 – Desmond Dekker & The Aces: "Mount Zion"
- WI 245 – Derrick Harriott: "Together" b/w "Mama Didn't Lie", 1965
- WI 246 – Theo Beckford: "If Life Was A Thing" (white+red label), 1965
- WI 247 – The Riots: "Yeah Yeah" b/w Baba Brooks: "Virginia Ska", 1965
- WI 248 – Theo Beckford: "What a Whoe" b/w "Bajan Girl", 1965
- WI 249 – The Two Kings: "Hit You Let You Feel It" b/w "Honey I Love You", 1965
- WI 250 – Daniel Johnson: "Come On My People" b/w "Brother Nathan", 1965
- WI 251 – Lee Roy: "Oo Ee Baby" b/w "My Loving Baby – Come Back"
- WI 252 – Laurel Aitken: "How Can I Forget You" b/w Owen Gray: "I'm Going Back", 1965
- WI 253 – Millie and Jackie: "Never Again" / Jackie Edwards: "This Is My Story"
- WI 254 – The Wailers: "What's New Pussycat" b/w "Where Will I Find", 1965
- WI 255 – Jackie Edwards: "White Christmas" b/w "My Love and I", 1965
- WI 256 – Rosco Gordon: "Surely I Love You" b/w "What You Do to Me", 1965
- WI 257 – Shirley & Lee: "Let the Good Times Roll" b/w "I'm Gone", 1965
- WI 258 – Owen Gray & The Sound System: "You Don't Know Like I Know" b/w "Take Me Serious", 1965
- WI 259 – Ronaldo Alphonso: "James Bond" b/w Lee Perry: "Just Keep it Up", 1965
- WI 260 – The Wailers: "Jungle Jamboree" b/w The Skatalites: "Independent Anniversary Ska (I Should Have Known Better)", 1966
- WI 261 – David Isaacs: "See That Man" b/w "I'd Rather Be Lonely", 1966
- WI 262 – Llans Thelwell and his Celestials: "Choo Choo Ska", 1966
- WI 263 – Avalons: "Everyday" b/w "I Love You", 1966
- WI 264 – Jackie Opel: "Love to Share" b/w Roland Alphonso: "Devoted to You", 1966
- WI 265 – Jackie and Millie: "My Desire" b/w Millie: "That's How Strong My Love Is", 1966
- WI 266 – Lord Brynner and the Sheiks: "Congo War" b/w "Teach Me to Ska", 1966
- WI 267 – Owen Gray: "Paradise" b/w "Bye Bye Love", 1966
- WI 268 – Wailers: "Put It On" / "Love Won't Be Mine", (white+red label)
- WI 269 – The Gaylads: "What Is Wrong", 1966
- WI 270 – Jackie Edwards: "Come Back Home" b/w "Sometimes", 1966
- WI 271 – Patsy Cole: "Disappointed Bride" b/w Earl Bostic: "Honeymoon Night", 1966 ("Patsy Cole" was a pseudonym for Genya Ravan)
- WI 272 – not issued
- WI 273 – Roy C: "Shotgun Wedding" b/w "I'm Gonna Make It" OR "High School Dropout", 1966 (Record was pressed with two different b-sides; UK #11, April 1966)
- WI 274 – Jackie Edwards: "L-O-V-E" b/w "What's Your Name", 1966
- WI 275 – Leapers Creepers Sleepers: "Precious Words"
- WI 276 – not issued
- WI 277 – Derrick Morgan: "It's Alright" / "I Need Someone", 1966
- WI 278 – Kim Fowley: "The Trip"
- WI 279 – The Circles: "Take Your Time"
- WI 280 – Wynder K. Frog: "Turn On Your Lovelight"
- WI 281 – The Gaylads: "Goodbye Daddy" b/w "Your Eyes", 1966
- WI 282 – Soul Brothers: "Green Moon" b/w Egal: "OK", 1966
- WI 283 – Fitzy & Freddy: "Why Did You Do It" b/w Roy Richards: "Double Trouble", 1966
- WI 284 – The Clarendonians: "Try Me One More Time" b/w "You Can't Keep Me Down" (white+ red label), 1966
- WI 285 – King Sparrow: "Beggars Have No Choice" b/w Marcia Griffith: "Funny", 1965
- WI 286 – Robert Parker: "Barefootin'" b/w "Let's Go Baby", 1966 (UK #24, August 1966)
- WI 287 – Jackie Edwards: "Think Twice" b/w "Oh Mary", 1966
- WI 288 – Derrick Morgan: "I Found a Queen" b/w Derrick & Patsy: "It's True, My Darling", 1966
- WI 289 – Derrick Morgan: "Amaletia" b/w Derrick & Patsy: "Don't You Worry", 1966
- WI 290 – not issued
- WI 291 – The Gaylads: "You Never Leave Him" b/w "Message To My Girl", 1966
- WI 292 – King Perry: "Doctor Dick Soul" b/w Soul Brothers: "Magic Star", 1966
- WI 293 – Jackie Mitoo: "Killer Diller" b/w Patrick Hylton: "Oh Lady", 1966
- WI 294 – The Skatalites: "Ska Bostello" b/w Don Drummond: "Looking Through the Window", 1966
- WI 295 – Desmond Baker And The Clarendonians: "Rude Boy Gonna Jail" b/w The Sharks: "Don't Fool Me", 1966
- WI 296 – Soul Brothers: "Sound One" b/w The Martine: "Grandfather's Clock", 1966
- WI 297 – Roy Richards: "Green Collie" b/w Marcia Griffith: "You're No Good"
- WI 298 – King Perry: "Rub and Squeeze" b/w Soul Brothers: "Here Comes the Minx"
- WI 299 – Roy Richards: "Western Standard Time" b/w The Eagles: "What a Agony"

==== Sue ====
The Sue label, initiated in 1963, was a subsidiary to release black US-American music. The releases followed the catalogue numbers of Island's singles starting at number 300. The first 17 releases of the British Sue label were in fact related to Henry 'Juggy' Murray's New York based Sue label. Some earlier issues from the black-owned independent American label established in 1957 were released on the London American label. The original Island agreement with the American company ended in disagreement and all (U.S.) Sue records were deleted from their catalogue in July 1965, and American Sue issues returned to the London American label. Island records retained the use of the name Sue until the final release in 1968.

- WI 301 – Inez Foxx: "Mockingbird" / "He's The One You Love"
- WI 302 – Baby Washington: "That's How Heartaches are Made" b/w "Doodlin", 1964
- WI 303 – Jimmy McGriff: "All About My Girl" b/w "MG Blues", 1964
- WI 304 – Inez Foxx: "Jaybirds" b/w "Broken-Hearted Fool", 1964
- WI 305 – Russell Byrd: "Hitch Hike", 1964
- WI 306 – Ike and Tina Turner: "Gonna Work Out Fine" b/w "Won't You Forgive Me", 1964
- WI 307 – Charlie and Inez Foxx: "Here We Go Round The Mulberry Bush" b/w "Competition", 1964
- WI 308 – Derak Martin: "Don't Put Me Down Like This"
- WI 309 – Ernestine Anderson: "Keep an Eye on Love"
- WI 310 – Jimmy McGriff: "Last Minute", 1964
- WI 311 – Mary Lou Williams: "Chuck-a-Lunk Jug", 1964
- WI 312 – The Soul Sisters: "I Can't Stand It" b/w "Blueberry Hill"
- WI 313 – Hank Jacobs: "So Far Away" b/w "Monkey, Hips and Rice", 1964
- WI 314 – Inez Foxx: "Ask Me" b/w "Hi Diddle Diddle", 1964
- WI 315 – Bobby Henricks: "Itchy Twitchy Feeling" b/w "A Thousand Dreams", 1964
- WI 316 – Barbara George: "Send for Me" b/w "Bless You", 1964
- WI 317 – Jimmy McGriff: "I've Got a Woman", 1964
- WI 318 – Tim Whitsett: "Macks by the Tracks" b/w "Shine", 1964
- WI 319 – Homesick James: "Crossroads" b/w "My Baby's Sweet", 1964
- WI 320 – Willie Mabon: "Got to Have Some" b/w "Why Did it Happen to Me?", 1964
- WI 321 – Baby Washington: "I Can't Wait Until I See My Baby" b/w "Who's Going to Take Care of Me?", 1964
- WI 322 – Ike and Tina Turner: "The Argument" b/w "Poor Fool", 1964
- WI 323 – Inez Foxx: "Hurt by Love" (UK #40, July 1964)
- WI 324 – Patti LaBelle And The Blue Belles: "Down the Aisle" b/w "C'est La Vie", 1964
- WI 325 – The Megatons: "Shimmy Shimmy Walk", 1964
- WI 326 – Bobby Lee Trammell: "New Dance in France" b/w "Carolyn", 1964
- WI 327 – Tony Washington: "Show Me How (To Milk a Cow)" b/w "Boof Ska", 1964
- WI 328 – Anita Wood: "Dream Baby" b/w "This Happened Before", 1964
- WI 329 – Jackie Edwards: "Staggar Lee" b/w "Pretty Girl", 1964
- WI 330 – Homesick James: "Set a Date" b/w "Can't Afford to Do It", 1965
- WI 331 – Willie Mabon: "Just Got Some" b/w "That's No Big Thing", 1965
- WI 332 – Doug Sheldon: "Take it Like a Man" b/w "Lonely Boy", 1964
- WI 333 – Jimmy McGriff: "'Round Midnight" b/w "Lonely Avenue", unreleased
- WI 334 – The Wallace Brothers: "Precious Words" b/w "You're Mine", 1964
- WI 335 – Elmore James: "Dust My Blues"
- WI 336 – The Soul Sisters: "Loop de Loop" b/w "Long Gone", unreleased
- WI 337 – Louisiana Red: "I Done Woke Up"
- WI 338 – not issued
- WI 339 – J.B. Lenoir And His African Hunch Rhythm: "I Sing Um The Way I Feel"
- WI 340 – Bobby Parker: "Watch Your Step" / "Steal Your Heart Away"
- WI 341 – Big Al Downing: "Yes I'm Loving You" b/w "Please Come Home", 1964
- WI 342 – Bobby Peterson: "Rockin' Charlie", 1964
- WI 343 – The Daylighters: "Oh Mom (Teach Me How to Uncle Willie)" b/w "Hard-Headed Girl", 1964
- WI 344 – Paul Revere & the Raiders: "Like Long Hair" b/w "Sharon", 1965
- WI 345 – Willie Mae Thornton: "Tom Cat" b/w "Monkey in the Barn", 1965
- WI 346 – Bobby Peterson: "Piano Rock" b/w "One Day", 1965
- WI 347 – June Bateman: "I Don't Wanna" b/w Noble "Thin Man" Watts and His Band: "Noble's Theme", 1965
- WI 348 – The Olympics: "The Bounce" b/w "Fireworks", 1965
- WI 349 – Freddy King: "Driving Sideways" b/w "Hideaway", 1965
- WI 350 – Ike & Tina Turner: "I Can't Believe What You Say"
- WI 351 – Chris Kenner: "Land of 1,000 Dances" b/w "That's My Girl", 1965
- WI 352 – Betty Everett: "I've Got A Claim On You"
- WI 353 – Harold Burrage: "I'll Take One" b/w "A Long Ways Together", 1965
- WI 354 – Roscoe Shelton: "Question" b/w "Strain on My Heart", 1965
- WI 355 – The Wallace Brothers: "Lover's Prayer" b/w "Love Me Like I Love You", 1965
- WI 356 – Inez & Charlie Foxx: "La De Da I Love You" b/w "Yankee Doodle Dandy", 1965
- WI 357 – The Pleasures: "Music City" b/w "If I Had a Little Money", 1965
- WI 358 – B. B. King: "You Never Know" b/w "The Letter", 1965
- WI 359 – Etta James & The Peaches: "Roll With Me Henry"
- WI 360 – James Brown and the Famous Flames: "Night Train" b/w "Why Does Everything Happen to Me", 1965
- WI 361 – John Lee Hooker: "Boogie Chillun"
- WI 362 – Otis Redding: "Shout Bamalama" b/w "Fat Girl", 1965
- WI 363 – Wilbert Harrison: "Let's Stick Together" b/w "Kansas City Twist", 1965
- WI 364 – Huey "Piano" Smith and the Clowns: "If It Ain't One Thing It's Another" b/w "Tu-Ber-Cu-Lucas and the Sinus Blues", 1965
- WI 365 – Sonny Boy Williamson: "No Nights by Myself" b/w "Boppin' With Sonny Boy", 1965
- WI 366 – Frankie Ford: "Sea Cruise" / "Roberta"
- WI 367 – Lee Dorsey: "Do-Re-Mi" / "Ya Ya", 1965
- WI 368 – Buster Brown: "Fannie Mae" b/w "Lost in a Dream", 1965
- WI 369 – Frankie Ford: "What's Going On" b/w "Watchdog", 1965
- WI 370 – Joe Tex: "Yum Yum Yum" b/w "You Little Baby Face Thing", 1965
- WI 371 – Larry Williams: "Strange" b/w "Call on Me", 1965
- WI 372 – Irma Thomas: "Don't Mess With My Man" b/w "Set Me Free", 1965
- WI 373 – Big Jay McNeely: "Something on Your Mind" b/w "Back...Shack...Track", 1965
- WI 374 – Bob & Earl: "Harlem Shuffle" b/w "I'll Keep Running Back", 1965
- WI 375 – Lowell Fulson: "Too Many Drivers" b/w "Key to My Heart", 1965
- WI 376 – Ike and Tina Turner: "Please, Please, Please" b/w "Am I a Fool in Love", 1965
- WI 377 – Donnie Elbert: "A Little Piece Of Leather" / "Do What'cha Wanna"
- WI 378 – Harold Betters: "Do Anything You Wanna", 1965
- WI 379 – Screamin' Jay Hawkins: "I Hear Voices" b/w "Just Don't Care", 1965
- WI 380 – Huey "Piano" Smith and the Clowns: "Rockin' Pneumonia and the Boogie Woogie Flu", 1965
- WI 381 – Larry Williams: "Turn On Your Lovelight" b/w "Dizzy Miss Lizzy", 1965
- WI 382 – Willie Mabon: "I'm the Fixer" b/w "Some More", 1965
- WI 383 – Elmore James: "It Hurts Me Too" b/w "Bleeding Heart", 1965
- WI 384 – The Manhattans: "I Wanna Be (Your Everything)" b/w "Searchin' for My Baby", 1965
- WI 385 – Little Joe Cook: "Stormy Monday Blues, Pt. 1" b/w "Pt. 2" (the ol' T-Bone Walker song, miscredited)
- WI 386 – Alexander Jackson and the Turnkeys: "The Whip" b/w "Tell it Like it Is", 1965
- WI 387 – Jimmy Johnson: "Don't Answer the Door", 1965
- WI 388 – Bobby Day: "Rockin' Robin" b/w "Over and Over", 1965
- WI 389 – The Ikettes: "Prisoner in Love" b/w "Those Words", 1965
- WI 390 – Tarheel Slim and Little Ann: "You Make Me Feel So Good" b/w "Got to Keep On Lovin' You", 1965
- WI 391 – The Dorsets: "Pork Chops" b/w "Cool It", 1965
- WI 392 – Elmore James: "Knocking at Your Door" b/w "Calling All Blues", 1965
- WI 393 – Bob and Earl: "Baby, I'm Satisfied" b/w "The Sissy", 1965
- WI 394 – Gladys Knight & the Pips: "Letter Full Of Tears" b/w "You Broke Your Promise", 1965
- WI 395 – Esther Philips: "The Chains" b/w "Feel Like I Wanna Cry", 1965
- WI 396 – Donnie Elbert: "You Can Push It (Or Pull It)" b/w "Lily Lou", 1965
- WI 397 – Professor Longhair: "Baby Let Me Hold Your Hand" b/w "Looka' No Hair", 1965
- WI 398 – The Baron with His Pounding Piano: "Is a Blue Bird Blue" b/w "In the Mood", 1965
- WI 399 – Lee Dorsey: "Messed Around" b/w "When I Meet My Baby", 1966

==== Black Swan ====
The Black Swan label was one of Island's first subsidiaries with releases from 1963 to 1965. With a black and white label the catalogue covered the WI series numbers from 401 to 471. From 1970 to 1971 Trojan/B&C Records used the label for records within a BW series. Island reactivated the label in 1976/1977 within the WIP series and with a small series of 12" singles in a BS series.

- WI 401 – Laurel Aitken: "Lion Of Judah" b/w "Remember My Darling" (b-side with Cynthia Richards), 1963
- WI 402 – Derrick Morgan: "Street Girl" b/w "Edmarine", 1963
- WI 403 – Jimmy Cliff: "The Man" b/w "You Are Never Too Old", 1963
- WI 404 – Wilfred Jackie Edwards: "Why Make Believe" b/w "Do You Want Me Again", 1963 (b-side with Velvetts)
- WI 405 – Delroy Wilson: "Spit In The Sky" b/w "Voodoo Man", 1963
- WI 406 – Don Drummond: "Scrap Iron" b/w Dragonaire: "Prevention", 1963
- WI 407 – Archibald Trott: "Get Together" b/w "Just Because", 1963
- WI 408 – The Melody Enchanters: "Oh Ma, Oh Pa" b/w Top Grant: "Coronation Street", 1963
- WI 409 – Roy & Millie: "You Are The Only One" b/w "Cherry, I Love You", 1963
- WI 410 – Roy & Millie: "Oh Merna" b/w Don Drummond: "Dog War Bossa Nova", 1963
- WI 411 – Laurel Aitken: "The Saint" b/w "Go, Gal, Go", 1963
- WI 412 – Baba Brooks: "Jelly Beans" b/w Eric Morris: "Sampson", 1964
- WI 413 – Stranger and Ken: "Uno-Dos" / "Look", 1963
- WI 414 – Baba Brooks: "Key To The City" b/w/ Eric Morris: "Solomon Gondie"
- WI 415 – Stranger Cole: "Summer Day" b/w "Loving You Always"
- WI 416 – Wilfred Jackie Edwards: "The Things You Do" b/w "Little Smile"
- WI 417 – Ernest Ranglin & The GB's: "Swing A Ling, Part 1" b/w "Part 2", 1964
- WI 418 – Barbara and Winston: "The Dream" b/w "I Love You", 1964
- WI 419 – Winston Samuels: "Luck Will Come My Way" b/w Lloyd Brevett: "One More Time", 1964
- WI 420 – Beltones: "Gloria Love" b/w Winston Francis: "You Are The One"
- WI 421 – Jackie Opel: You're No Good / King Liges
- WI 422 – Tommy McCook: Two For One / Lascelles Perkins: I Don't Know
- WI 423 – The Vikings: Down By The Riverside / This Way, 1964
- WI 425 – Derrick Morgan: Cherry Pie / Bob Walls: Remember Where You're From, 1964
- WI 426 – Winston Samuels: You Are The One / Gloria Love, 1964
- WI 427 – Roy and Millie: Oh Shirley / Marie, 1964
- WI 428 – Vikings: Treat Me Bad / Sitting On Top, 1964
- WI 429 – Keith and Enid: Lost My Love / I Cried, 1964
- WI 430 – The Maytals: Come Into My Parlour / I Am In Love, 1964
- WI 431 – Marguerita: Woman Come / Eric Morris: Number One, 1964
- WI 432 – Melody Enchanters: Enchanted Ball / Sailor Boy
- WI 433 – Eric Morris: Supper In The Gutter / Ambition, 1964
- WI 434 – Baba Brooks: Spider / Meldoy Jamboree
- WI 435 – Stranger Cole: Boy Blue / Eric Morris: Words Of Wisdom, 1964
- WI 436 – Roy and Yvonne: Two Roads / Join Together, 1964
- WI 437 – Jimmy James: Thinking Of You / Shirley, 1964
- WI 438 – Baba Brooks: Cork Foot / The Hersang Combo: BBC Channel 2
- WI 439 – Eric Morris: River Come Down / Eric Morris: Seek And You'll Find, 1964
- WI 440 – Shenley Duffas: Digging A Ditch / He's Coming Down, 1964
- WI 441 – Bobby Aitken: Jericho / Lester Sterling: Lunch Time
- WI 442 – Baba Brooks: Musical Workshop / Duke White: Be Wise
- WI 443 – Shenley Duffus: Gather Them In / Crucifixion
- WI 444 – Baba Brooks: Bus Strike / Duke White: Sow Good Seeds
- WI 445 – Eric Morris: Home Sweet Home / Lester Sterling: 64, 1964
- WI 446 – Frank Cosmo: Alone / Beautiful Book
- WI 447 – Lloyd Briscoe: Spiritualist Mambo / Baba Brooks: Fly Right, 1964
- WI 448 – The Cherry Pies: Do You Keep On Dreaming / Sweeter Than Cherry Pies
- WI 449 – Charlie Organaire: Go Home / Theo Beckford: Ungrateful People, 1964
- WI 450 – Lloyd Briscoe: My Love Has Come / Baba Brooks: Sweet Eileen
- WI 451 – Sonny and Yvonne: Night After Night / Sonny Burke Group: Here We Go Again, 1965
- WI 452 – Theophilus Beckford: Take Your Time / Stranger Cole: Happy Go Lucky
- WI 453 – Baba Brooks: Take Five / Viney Gale: Go On
- WI 454 – Lloyd Briscoe: Trojan / I Am The Least
- WI 455 – Desmond Dekker: Dracula / Don Drummond: Spitfire, 1964
- WI 456 – Baba Brooks: Dreadnaught / Playgirls: Looks Are Everything, 1964
- WI 457 – Sonny Burke: I Love You Still / It's Always A Pleasure, 1965
- WI 458 – Sonny Burke: City In The Sky / Everyday I Love You More
- WI 459 – Tony Washington: But I Do / D.C.s: Night Train, 1964
- WI 460 – Tony Washington: Dilly Dilly / But I Do, 1964
- WI 461 – Sonny and Yvonne: Night After Night / Here We Go Again, 1964
- WI 462 – Stranger Cole & Patsy: Hey Little Girl / Cornel Campbell: Make Hay, 1965
- WI 463 – Lord Creator: Wicked Lady / The Maytals: My Little Ruby, 1964
- WI 464 – The Maytals: John And James / Theo Beckford: Sailing On, 1965
- WI 465 – Stranger & Ken: I Want To Go Home / Richard Suanders: The Sign Of The Times
- WI 466 – Baba Brooks: Baby Elephant Walk / Don Drummond: Don's Special
- WI 467 – Marvin and Johnny: Cherry Pie / Ain't That Right, 1965
- WI 468 – Joe & Ann: Gee Baby / Wherever You May Be, 1965
- WI 469 – Sonny Burke: Glad / Jeanie
- WI 470 – Sonny Burke: Dance With Me / My Girl Can't Cook
- WI 471 – Sonny Burke: Wicked People / God In Heaven Knows

==== Jump Up ====
Jump Up started in 1963 and released singles mainly in calypso style until ca. 1967. Around 1970 Trojan/B&C continued to release with the label, continuing with both prefix and catalogue numbers. (Tapir's)

- JU 501 – Mighty Dougla: Laziest Man / Dance Me Lover
- JU 502 – Lord Blakie: Maria / Snakes In The Square
- JU 503 – Lord Creator With The Byron Lee Orchestra: Jamaica Jump Up / Laziest Man, 1963
- JU 504 – Lord Kitchener: Love In The Cemetery / Jamaican Woman, 1962
- JU 505 – Gene Lawrence: Longest Day Meringie / Bachelor Boy
- JU 506 – Lord Kitchener: Road / Neighbour, 1967
- JU 507 – Mighty Sparrow: Kennedy & Khruschev / The Slave (National Record Co, Trinidad, 1962)
- JU 508 – Mighty Dougla: Teacher Teacher / Split Me In Two
- JU 509 – Mighty Dougla: Ugliness / My Wicked Boy Child
- JU 510 – Gene Lawrence: Longest Day Meringue / Bachelor Boy
- JU 511 – Lord Kitchener: Dr. Kitch / Come Back Home Meh Boy (Telco Records, Trinidad, 1963)
- JU 512 – Jackie Opel: TV In Jamaica / Worrells Captaincy (Beverleys Jamaica, 1963)
- JU 513 – Mighty Dougla: You Wasting Your Time / The Smart Barbadian (Telco Records, Trinidad)
- JU 515 – Lord Christo: The Dumb Boy And The Parrot / The General Hospital, 1967
- JU 516 – Nap Hepburn: Political Girl / The River
- JU 517 – Lord Cristo: Election War Zone / Bad Luck Man, 1967
- JU 518 – King Fighter: People Will Talk / Same Thing, 1965
- JU 519 – Joey Lewis: Nut Vendor / Marriage Recipe
- JU 520 – Ramon Otano: Mambo Trinidad / Fiesta En La Joya
- JU 521 – Joey Lewis Band: Oye Mi Son / Yo-No-Se
- JU 522 – Lord Blakie: Chinese Restaurant (Curry Shrimp & Rice) / What They Get, They Will Take
- JU 523 – Mighty Sparrow: Bull Pistle Gang / Village Ram
- JU 524 – Lord Creator: Big Bamboo / Marjorie & Harry
- JU 525 – Young Growler: Bulldozer / Clarabel
- JU 526 – Young Growler: Pressure In Britain / Pretentious Woman
- JU 527 – Lord Nelson: Party For Santa Claus / Stella
- JU 528 – Young Growler: Lucy Swimming Pool / Topless Dress
- JU 529 – Young Growler: Pussy Galore / Sledgehammer
- JU 530 – Lord Kitchener: Kitch You So Sweet / Ain't That Fun, 1967
- JU 531 – Baldhead Growler: The Sausage / Bingo Woman, 1967

==== Aladdin ====
Island's "first serious stab at setting up a pukka pop label". Releases were numbered in a WI-6xx series, but the matrix number of Jackie Edwards' "He'll Have To Go" was WI 2000, suggesting that it might have been intended to use that catalogue number series instead.

- WI 601 – Jackie Edwards: "He'll Have To Go" b/w "Gotta Learn To Love Again", 1965
- WI 602 – unissued
- WI 603 – Owen Gray: "Gonna Work Out Fine" b/w "Dolly Baby", 1965
- WI 604 – Theo Johnson: "Masters Of War" b/w "Water Is Wide", 1965
- WI 605 – Jackie Edwards: "Hush" b/w "I Am In Love With You No More", 1965
- WI 606 – Dinah Lee: "I'll Forgive You Then Forget You" b/w "Nitty Gritty", 1965
- WI 607 – Owen Gray: "Linda Lu" b/w "Can I Get A Witness", 1965
- WI 608 – Dinah Lee: "I Can't Believe What You Say" b/w "Pushin' A Good Thing Too Far", 1965
- WI 609 – Prince & Princess: "Ready Steady Go" b/w "Take Me Serious", 1965
- WI 610 – unissued
- WI 611 – Jackie Edwards: "The Same One" b/w "I Don't Know", 1965
- WI 612 – Lord Kitchener: "Dr. Kitch" b/w "Come Back Home Meh Boy", 1965 (reissue)

==== Brit ====
A short-lived subsidiary whose releases came out in the spring of 1965. The handful of releases were numbered in the WI-1000 series.

- WI 1001 – Bobby Jameson: "Rum-Pum" b/w "I Want To Know Why", 1965
- WI 1002 – Millie: "My Street" b/w "Mixed Up, Fickle, Moody, Self-Centred, Spoiled Kind Of Boy", 1965
- WI 1003 – The Cannon Brothers: "Turn Your Eyes To Me" b/w "Don't Stop Now", 1965
- WI 1004 – The Anglos: "Incense" b/w "You're Fooling Me", 1965 (a US production featuring vocalist Joe Webster, originally issued on Orbit Records in USA. For several years it was rumoured wrongly that the A-side featured Stevie Winwood, who had recorded under the pseudonym 'Steve Anglo'. Disc was later reissued – see WIP-6061)
- WI 1005 – Dinah Lee: "I Can't Believe What You Say" b/w "Pushing A Good Thing Too Far" (unissued on Brit label – later issued on Aladdin, see WI-608)

==== Island (WI 3000 series) ====
The catalogue numbers 3000 ff. had been chosen after the first series ended at number 299 and 300 ff. had been used for the Sue label (see above).

- WI 3000 – Roy Richards: "South Viet Nam" b/w "You Must Be Sorry I(Vocal)", 1966
- WI 3001 – The Wailers: "He Who Feels It Knows It" b/w "Sunday Morning", 1966
- WI 3002 – The Gaylads: "Stop Making Love" b/w "They Call Her Dawn", 1966
- WI 3003 – The V.I.P.'s: "I Wanna Be Free" b/w "Don't Let It Go", 1966
- WI 3004 – unissued
- WI 3005 – The Claredonians: "I'll Never Change" b/w "Rules Of Life", 1966
- WI 3006 – Jackie Edwards: "I Feel So Bad" b/w "I Don't Want To Be Made A Fool Of", 1966
- WI 3007 – Belfast Gypsies: "Gloria's Dream" b/w "Secret Police", 1966
- WI 3008 – Robert Parker: "Happy Feet" b/w "The Scratch", 1966
- WI 3009 – The Wailers: "Let Him Go (Rude Boy Get Bail)" b/w "Sinner Man", 1966
- WI 3010 – Derrick Morgan: "Gather Together Now" b/w "Soft Hand Nice", 1966
- WI 3011 – Wynder K Frog: "Sunshine Superman" b/w "Blues For a Frog", 1966
- WI 3012 – unissued
- WI 3013 – Delroy Wilson: "Dancing Mood" b/w Soul Brothers: "More & More" (white+red label), 1966
- WI 3014 – unissued
- WI 3015 – Ethiopians: "I am Free" b/w Soul Brothers: "Shanty Town"
- WI 3016 – Soul Brothers: "Mr. Flint" b/w "Too Young To Love", 1966
- WI 3017 – Freaks of Nature: "People Let's Freak Out" b/w "Secret Police (Shadow Crashers)", 1966
- WI 3018 – Jackie Edwards: "Royal Telephone" b/w/ "It's No Secret", 1967
- WI 3019 – Joyce Bond: "Tell Me What It's All About" b/w "Tell Me Right Now", 1967
- WI 3020 – Ken Boothe: "Train Is Coming" b/w "This Is Me", 1966
- WI 3021 – unissued
- WI 3022 – Gaylads: Don't Say No / Sonny Burke: You Rule My Heart, 1967
- WI 3023 – Slim Smith: I've Got Your Number / New Boss, 1967
- WI 3024 – unissued
- WI 3025 – The Gaylads: No Good Girl / Yes Girl, 1967
- WI 3026 – Joe Higgs: I Am The Song (The Prophet) / Worry No More, 1967
- WI 3027 – Roy Richards: Rub-A-Dub / The Sharks: Baby Come Home, 1967
- WI 3028 – Bobby Aitken: Kiss Bam Bam / Cynthia Richards: How Could I, 1967
- WI 3029 – Tony Gregory: Get Out Of My Life / Soul Brothers: Sugar Cane, 1967
- WI 3030 – Jackie Edwards: Only A Fool Breaks His Own Heart / The End, 1967
- WI 3031 – Buster Brown: My Blue Heaven / Two Women, 1967
- WI 3032 – Clarendonians: Shoo Be Doo Be / Sweet Heart Of Beauty, 1967
- WI 3033 – Delroy Wilson: Riding For A Fall / Got To Change Your Ways, 1967
- WI 3034 – Dudley Sibley: Gun Man / Denzil Thorpe: Monkey Speaks His Mind, 1967
- WI 3035 – Ken Boothe: I Don't Want To See You Cry / Baby I Need You, 1967
- WI 3036 – The Ethiopians: For You / Soul Brothers: Sound Pressure (white+red label)
- WI 3037 – Delroy Wilson: Ungrateful Baby / Roy Richards: Hopeful Village Ska, 1967
- WI 3038 – Soul Brothers: Cherry / Soul Junior: Out Of My Mind, 1967
- WI 3039 – Soul Brothers: Hi-Life / Delroy Wilson: Close To Me, 1967
- WI 3040 – Bob Andy: I've Got To Go Back Home / Sonny Burke: Rudy Girl, 1967
- WI 3041 – The Claredonians: You Can't Be Happy / Goodbye Forever, 1967
- WI 3042 – Peter Touch: I Am The Toughest / Marcia Griffiths: No Faith, 1967
- WI 3043 – The Wailers: Bend Down Low / Freedom Time, 1967
- WI 3044 – Chords Five: I Am Only Dreaming / Universal Vegrant, 1967
- WI 3045 – The Paragons: "On The Beach" / Tommy McCook: Sweet And Gentle, 1967
- WI 3046 – Alton Ellis and the Flames: Cry Tough / Carol With Tommy McCook: Mr. Solo, 1967
- WI 3047 – Tommy McCook: 1, 2, 3 Kick / The Treasure Isle Boys: What A Fool, 1967
- WI 3048 – Justin Hinds: On A Saturday Night / Save A Bread, 1967
- WI 3049 – The Moving Brothers: Darling I Love You / Tommy McCook: Saboo, 1967
- WI 3050 – Delroy Wilson: Get Ready / Roy Richards: Port 'O'Jam, 1967
- WI 3051 – Winston Samuels: The Greatest / Freddie & Fitsy: Truth Hurts, 1967
- WI 3052 – Soul Boys: Blood Pressure / Rita Marley: Come To Me, 1967
- WI 3053 – Winston Samuels: I Won't Be Discouraged / Freddie& Fitsy: Why Did My Little Girl Cry, 1967
- WI 3054 – Hopeton Lewis: Rock Steady / Cool Collie, 1967
- WI 3055 – Hopeton Lewis: Finders Keepers / Roland Alphonso: Shanty Town Curfew, 1967
- WI 3056 – Hopeton Lewis: Let Me Come On Home / Hardships Of Life, 1967
- WI 3057 – Hopeton Lewis: Run Down / Pick Yourself Up, 1967
- WI 3058 – Tartans: Dance All Night / What Can I Do, 1967
- WI 3059 – Hopeton Lewis: Let the Little Girl Dance / This Music Got Soul, 1967
- WI 3060 – Mighty Vikings Band: Do Re Mi / The Sound Of Music, 1967
- WI 3061 – Shadrocks: Go Go Special / Count Down, 1967
- WI 3062 – Granville Williams Orchestra: Hi-life / More, 1967
- WI 3063 – Derrick Harriott: "The Loser" / Bless You, 1967
- WI 3064 – Derrick Harriott: Happy Times / You My Everything, 1967
- WI 3065 – Astronauts: Before You Leave / Syncopate, 1967
- WI 3066 – Lynn Tait & The Jets: Something Stupid / Blue Tuesday, 1967
- WI 3067 – The Paragons: Talking Love / If I Were You, 1967
- WI 3068 – Hopeton Lewis: Rock A Shacka / I Don't Want Trouble, 1967
- WI 3069 – Leslie Butler: Polonaise Reggae / You Don't Have To Say, 1967
- WI 3070 – Roy Shirley: People Rock Steady / Slim Smith & Uniques: Trying Hard To Find A Home, 1967
- WI 3071 – Roy Shirley: Musical War / Soul Voice, 1967
- WI 3072 – Glen Adams: Silent Lover / I Remember, 1967
- WI 3073 – Tomorrow's Children: Bang Bang Rock Steady / Rain Rock Steady, 1967
- WI 3074 – Sammy Ismay & Mighty Vikings: Rockitty Fockitty, 1967
- WI 3075 – Lynn Taitt & The Jets: I Don't Want To See You Cry / Nice Time, 1967
- WI 3076 – Hopeton Lewis: Everybody Rocking / Stars Shining So Bright, 1967
- WI 3077 – Derrick Harriott: Walk The Streets / Bobby Ellis: Step Softly, 1967
- WI 3078 – Henry Buckley: Thank You Girl / Take Me Back, 1967
- WI 3079 – Derrick & Pauline Morgan: Someone / Do You Love Me, 1967
- WI 3080 – Alva Lewis: I'm Indebted / Groovers: You've Got To Cry, 1967
- WI 3081 – Henry Buckley: I'll Reach The End / Don Tony Lee: Lee's Special, 1967
- WI 3082 – Ken Parker: How Could I / Sonny Burke: Choo Choo Train, 1967
- WI 3083 – Glen Adams: She / S. Burke: Some Other Time, 1967
- WI 3084 – Slim Smith & the Uniques: Gypsy Woman / Ken Rose: Wall Flower, 1967
- WI 3085 – Keith & Tex: Tonight / Lynn Tait: You Have Caught Me, 1967
- WI 3086 – Slim Smith & the Uniques: Let Me Go Girl / Soulettes: Dum Dum, 1967
- WI 3087 – Uniques: Never Let Me Go / Don Lee: Lees Special, 1967
- WI 3088 – Rude Boys: Rock Steady Massachusetts / Going Home, 1967
- WI 3089 – Derrick Harriott: Solomon / Bobby Ellis & Crystallites: The Emperor, 1967
- WI 3090 – Mike Thompson Junior & Jets: Rock Steady Wedding / Flowerpot Bloomers, 1967
- WI 3091 – Keith & Tex: Stop That Train / Bobby Ellis & The Crystallies: Feeling Peckish, 1967
- WI 3092 – Rudy Mills: Long Story / Bobby Ellis & Crystallites: Now We Know, 1967
- WI 3093 – Paragons: So Depressed / We Were Meant To Be, 1967
- WI 3094 – Lloyd & Devon: Red Bum Ball / Derrick Morgan: Conquering Ruler, 1968
- WI 3095 – Viceroys: Lip And Tongue / Dawn Penn: When Am I Gonna Be Free, 1968
- WI 3096 – Ken Parker: Down Low / Sad Mood, 1968
- WI 3097 – Dawn Penn: I'll Never Let You Go / Mark Brown: Brownlow Special, 1968
- WI 3098 – Roy Shirley: Thank You / Roy Shirley: Touch Them, 1968
- WI 3099 – Delroy Wilson: This Heart Of Mine / Glen Adams: Grab A Girl, 1968
- WI 3100 – Glen Adams: Hold Down Miss Winey / Vincent Gordon: Sounds And Soul, 1968
- WI 3101 – Derrick Morgan: Gimme Back / Viceroys: Send Requests, 1968
- WI 3102 – Nehemia Reid: Family War / Give Me That Love, 1968
- WI 3103 – Frank Brown: Some Come, Some Go / Consomates: Do It Now, 1968
- WI 3104 – Max Romeo: Put Me In The Mood / My One Girl, 1968
- WI 3105 – Ken Parker: Lonely Man / Bunnie Lee: Joy In My Heart, 1968
- WI 3106 – Glen Adams: That New Girl / Uniques: Speak No Evil, 1968
- WI 3107 – Uniques: Lesson Of Love / Delroy Wilson: Till I Die, 1968
- WI 3108 – Roy Shirley: Move All Day / Rollin' Rollin', 1968
- WI 3109 – Webber Sisters: My World / Alva Lewis: Lonely Still, 1968
- WI 3110 – Sensations: Long Time No See You Girl / Roy Shirley: Million Dollar Baby, 1968
- WI 3111 – Max Romeo: Walk Into The Dawn / Dawn Penn: I'll Get You, 1968
- WI 3112 – Roy Wilson: Dread Saras / David Brown: All My Life, 1968
- WI 3113 – Val Bennett: Jumping With Mr. Lee / Roy Shirley: Keep Your Eyes On The Road, 1968
- WI 3114 – Uniques: Build My World Around You / Lloyd Clarke – I'll Never Change, 1968
- WI 3115 – Pat Perrin: Over You / Lloyd Terrell: Lost Without You, 8/1968
- WI 3116 – Lloyd Clarke: Summertime / Val Bennett: Soul Survivor, 8/1968
- WI 3117 – Uniques: More Love / Val Bennett: Lovall's Special, 1968
- WI 3118 – Roy Shirley: Good Is Better Than Bed / Fantastic Lover, 1968
- WI 3119 – Roy Shirley & Uniques: Facts Of Life / Leas Us Not Into Temptation, 1968
- WI 3120 – Glen Adams: She's So Fine / Roy Shirley: Girlie, 1968
- WI 3121 – Pat Kelly: Somebody's Baby / Bevely Simmons: Please Don't Leave Me, 1968
- WI 3122 – Slim Smith & The Uniques: My Conversation / Slim Smith: Love One Another, 1968
- WI 3123 – Uniques: The Beautitude / Keith Blake: Time On The River, 1968
- WI 3124 – Pat Kelly: Twelfth Of Never / Val Bennett: Caldonia, 1968
- WI 3125 – Roy Shirley: If I Did Know / Good Ambition, 8/1968
- WI 3126 – Federals: Penny For Your Song / I've Passed This Way Before, 1968
- WI 3127 – Delroy Wilson: Once Upon A Time / I Want To Love You, 1968
- WI 3128 – Stranger & Gladdy: Love Me Today / Over And Over Again, 8/1968
- WI 3129 – Gaylets: Silent River Runs Deep / You're My Kind Of Man, 1968
- WI 3130 – Alfred Brown & Melmoth: I Want Someone / Alfred Brown: One Scotch One Bourbon One Beer, 1968
- WI 3131 – Joe Higgs: You Hurt My Soul / Lynn Taitt & The Jets: Why Am I Treated So Bad, 1968
- WI 3132 – Horatio Soul: Ten White Horses / Angela, 1968
- WI 3133 – The Tennors: Ride Your Donkey / I've Got To Get You Off My Mind, 1968
- WI 3134 – Ike & Crystallites: Illya Kuryakin / Bobby Ellis & Crystallites: Ann Marie, 1968
- WI 3135 – Derrick Harriott: Do I Worry / Bobby Ellis & Crystallites: Shuntlin', 1968
- WI 3136 – Bobby Ellis & Crystallites: Dollar A Head / Rudy Mills: I'm Trapped, 8/1968
- WI 3137 – Keith & Tex: Hypnotising Eyes / Keith & Tex: Lonely Man, 8/1968
- WI 3138 – The Paragons: Memories By The Score / The Number One For Me, 9/1968
- WI 3139 – Lynn Taitt And The Jets: Napoleon Solo / Pressure And Slide, 1968
- WI 3140 – The Tennors: Copy Me Donkey / Ronnie Davis: The Stage, 8/1968
- WI 3141 – The Gaylets: I Like Your World / That Lonely Feeling, 8/1968
- WI 3142 – The Versatiles: Someone To Love / Teardrops Falling, 1968
- WI 3143 – Natives: Live It Up / Never Break My Heart, 1968
- WI 3144 – Lyn Beckford: Combination / Keelynn Beckford: Hey Little Girl, 8/1968
- WI 3145 – The Uniques: Girl Of My Dreams / Lester Sterling: Tribute To King Scratch, 8/1968
- WI 3146 – Val Bennett: The Russians Are Coming / Lester Sterling: Sir Lee's Whip, 8/1968
- WI 3147 – Derrick Harriott: Born To Love You / Ike Bennett & Crystallites: Alfred Hitchcock, 1968
- WI 3148 – David Anthony: All Night / David Anthony: Out Of My Mind, 1968
- WI 3149 – Noel Brown: Man's Temptation / Heartbreak Girl, 1968
- WI 3150 – Errol Dunkley: Once More / I'm Not Your Man, 1968
- WI 3151 – Ike B & Crystallites: Try A Little Merriness / Patricia, 1968
- WI 3152 – Federals: Shocking Love / By The River, 1968
- WI 3153 – Derrick Harriott: Tang! Tang! Festival Song / Ike Bennett & Crystallites: James Ray, 8/1968
- WI 3154 – Stranger Cole: Jeboza Macoo / Stranger & Gladdy: Now I Know, 1968
- WI 3155 – Charlie Kelly: So Nice Like Rice / Stranger & Gladdy: Over Again, 1968
- WI 3156 – The Tennors: Gram-Pa / Romeo Stewart: While I Was Walking, 9/1968
- WI 3157 – Jackie Edwards: You're My Girl / Heaven Only Knows, 8/1968
- WI 3158 – Lloyd And Johnny Melody: My Argument / Johnny Melody: Foey Man, 1968
- WI 3159 – Derrick Morgan: Hold You Jack / One Morning In May, 1968
- WI 3160 – D. Tony Lee: It's Reggae Time / Errol Dunkley: The Clamp, 1968

==== Sue (WI 4000 series) ====
- WI 4001 – Little Richard: "Without Love" b/w "Dance What You Wanna", 1966
- WI 4002 – Tommy Duncan: "Dance, Dance, Dance" b/w "Let's Try it Over Again", 1966
- WI 4003 – Jerry Butler: "I Stand Accused" b/w "I Don't Want to Hear Anymore", 1966
- WI 4004 – Jimmy Reed: "Odds and Ends" b/w "Going by the River, Part 1", 1966
- WI 4005 – Phil Upchurch Combo: "You Can't Sit Down, Pt. 1" b/w "Pt. 2" (UK #39, May 1966)
- WI 4006 – Jimmy Hughes: "Goodbye My Love" b/w "It Was Nice", 1966
- WI 4007 – Elmore James: "I Need You" b/w "Mean Mistreating Mama", 1966
- WI 4008 – not issued
- WI 4009 – Jerry Butler: "Just for You" b/w "Believe in Me", 1966
- WI 4010 – Ellie Smith: "Dial That Telephone", 1966
- WI 4011 – Ritchie Valens: "La Bamba" b/w "Donna", unreleased
- WI 4012 – Billy Preston: "Billy's Bag" b/w "Don't Let the Sun Catch You Cryin’", 1966
- WI 4013 – The Jaybirds: "Somebody Help Me" b/w "The Right Kind", 1966
- WI 4014 – Birdlegs and Pauline: "Spring" b/w "In So Many Ways", 1966
- WI 4015 – Little Richard: "It Ain't Watcha Do" b/w "Crossover", 1966
- WI 4016 – Thurston Harris: "Little Bitty Pretty One" b/w "I Hope You Won't Hold It Against Me", 1966
- WI 4017 – Phil Upchurch Combo: "Nothing but the Soul" b/w "Evad", 1966
- WI 4018 – The Righteous Brothers: You Can Have Her / Justine, 1966
- WI 4019 – The Spidells: "Find Out What's Happening" b/w "That Makes My Heart Break", 1966
- WI 4020 – The Santells: "So Fine" b/w "These Are Love", 1966
- WI 4021 – Little Milton: "Early in the Morning" b/w "Bless Your Heart", 1966
- WI 4022 – Shades of Blue: "Oh! How Happy" b/w "Little Orphan Boy", 1966
- WI 4023 – Lowell Fulsom: "Talking Woman" b/w "Blues Around Midnight", 1966
- WI 4024 – Raymond Parker: "Ring Around the Roses" b/w "She's Coming Home", 1966
- WI 4025 – Lydia Marcelle: "Another Kind of Fellow" b/w "I've Never Been Hurt Like This Before", 1966
- WI 4026 – Gerri Hall: "Who Can I Run To" b/w "I Lost a Key", 1966
- WI 4027 – Mr. Dynamite: "Sh'mon", 1967
- WI 4028 – Barbara Lynn: "Letter To Mommy And Daddy" b/w "Second Fiddle Girl", Jan. 1967
- WI 4029 – Sugar Simone: "Suddenly" b/w "King Without a Throne", 1967
- WI 4030 – Bob and Earl: "Don't Ever Leave Me" b/w "Fancy Free", 1967
- WI 4031 – Danny White: "Keep My Woman Home" b/w "I Am Dedicating My Life", 1967
- WI 4032 – Don and Dewey: "Soul Motion" b/w "Stretchin' Out", March 1967
- WI 4033 – The Anglos: "Incense" b/w "You're Fooling Me", unreleased
- WI 4034 – The Kelly Brothers: "Falling in Love Again" b/w "Crying Days Are Over", April 1967
- WI 4035 – Theola Kilgore: "I'll Keep Trying" b/w "He's Coming Back to Me", April 1967
- WI 4036 – The Wallace Brothers: "I'll Step Aside" b/w "Hold My Hurt for a While", April 1967
- WI 4037 – Edgewood Smith and the Fabulous Tailfeathers: "Ain't That Lovin'" b/w "Yeah", May 1967
- WI 4038 – Barbara Lynn: "You'll Lose a Good Thing" b/w "Lonely Heartaches", April 1967
- WI 4039 – Claudine Clark: "The Strength to Be Strong" b/w "Moon Madness", May 1967
- WI 4040 – Jackie Day: "Before it's Too Late" b/w "Without a Love", May 1967
- WI 4041 – Paul Martin: "Snake in the Grass" b/w "I've Got a New Love", July 1967
- WI 4042 – John Roberts: "Sockin' 1, 2, 3, 4" b/w "Sophisticated Funk", February 1968
- WI 4043 – O.V. Wright: "What About You" b/w "What Did You Tell This Girl of Mine", March 1968
- WI 4044 – Bobby Bland: "That Did It" b/w "A Touch of the Blues", March 1968
- WI 4045 – Al King: "Think Twice Before You Speak" b/w "The Winner", March 1968
- WI 4046 – Joe Matthews: "Sorry Ain't Good Enough" b/w "You Better Mend Your Ways", March 1968
- WI 4047 – Thelma Jones: "Stronger" b/w "Never Leave Me", April 1968
- WI 4048 – The Lamp Sisters: "A Woman With the Blues" b/w "I Thought it Was All Over", May 1968
- WI 4049 – Fascinations: "Girls Are Out to Get You" b/w "You Be Sorry", June 1968
- WI 4050 – The Sapphires: "Who Do You Love" b/w "Where is Johnny Now", unreleased

==== Island WIP series ====
This series commenced in January 1967 and initially ran alongside the existing WI 3000 series (see above). It coincided with the introduction of a new pink label design (chosen, according to label founder and owner Chris Blackwell, "because it created a clear break from our Jamaican years") and the "P" in WIP is variously said to stand for "Pink" or "Progressive", reflecting the fact that this new series was geared towards the new generation of rock/pop acts that Island had begun to accumulate from early 1967 onwards, as well as artists from its traditional roster who were being oriented towards the rock/pop audience, such as Jackie Edwards and Jimmy Cliff. Another change was that releases in the WIP series were normally stereo productions. Major UK top twenty singles' chart success for the label came very early in the WIP series, with WIP-6002 – Traffic's "Paper Sun" (#5, 6/1967), a classic slice of British psychedelia released just in time for the "summer of love", but quite a high proportion of the early WIP-series output was by artists who failed to develop as anticipated (e.g. Hard Meat, The Smoke) or represented one-off licensing deals with artists who never again appeared in the Island listings (e.g. WIP-6001, WIP-6013, etc.). The series continued throughout the 1970s and into the early 1980s (see below).

The first of a series of pink label designs was used for singles WIP-6000 to WIP-6051, inclusive. Sometimes referred to as the "eye" label design, it featured an orange and black elliptical device on the left-hand side of the label which could be said to resemble a grotesque eyeball when viewed sideways. "A" and "B" sides were clearly delineated on this early series of pink label singles, thus: WIP-6050-A (Traffic's "Medicated Goo") and WIP-6050-B (the same band's "Shanghai Noodle Factory").

Beginning with WIP-6052, a new series of matrix numbers was introduced for 7" singles. Henceforward, singles' sides were not usually identified as "A" or "B", but each bore a unique matrix number in a series starting at wipx 1002. The matrix number appeared on the label, usually upside-down directly beneath the main catalogue number. The matrix numbers seem to have been allocated to each release in numerical sequence, irrespective of the actual or proposed release date of the record; thus the two sides of WIP-6056 (Jethro Tull's "Living In The Past" b/w "Driving Song") have matrix numbers wipx 1010 and wipx 1011, respectively. Initially, the new matrix numbers were used in conjunction with the existing "eye" label design, but beginning with releases in June 1969 a new pink label design was introduced, known as the "block" design. The new design continued to feature the "eye" device in plain black enclosed within the push-out centre of the record, but the company name was now written in capital letters within a rectangular black block in the lower part of the label. The first release to feature the new label design appears to have been WIP-6060 and the last to feature the orange-and-black "eye" design WIP-6061, a reissue of "Incense" by the Anglos, which had actually been released the previous month. One or two earlier releases which were evidently still selling were re-pressed with the new design (e.g. WIP-6056, which exists with both the orange-and-black "eye" and the "block" label designs).

Towards the end of 1969, artists signed to Terry Ellis and Chris Wright's Chrysalis management company began to be favoured with a special Chrysalis label design – green with a red Chrysalis butterfly logo. Initially this applied to Jethro Tull and former Tull guitarist Mick Abrahams' band Blodwyn Pig. These early Chrysalis singles were allotted catalogue and matrix numbers in the main Island WIP and wipx series, respectively, and bore the legend "manufactured and distributed by island records basing st london" on the upper circumference of the label. Chrysalis continued to issue singles bearing Island catalogue numbers until Autumn 1971, after which the label broke away completely and began its own series of catalogue numbers in a CHS 2000 series.

- WIP-6000 – Owen Gray: "Help Me" b/w "Incense", 14/1/1967
- WIP-6001 – Rene & Rene: "Loving You Could Hurt Me So Much" b/w "Little Diamonds", 14/1/1967
- WIP-6002 – Traffic: "Paper Sun" b/w "Giving to You", 5/1967 (UK #5, June 1967)
- WIP-6003 – Ray Cameron: "Doing My Time" b/w "Getaway, Getaway Car", 1/1967
- WIP-6004 – Jimmy Cliff: "Give and Take" b/w "Aim And Ambition", 2/1967
- WIP-6005 – The V.I.P.'s: "Straight Down To The Bottom" b/w "In A Dream", 2/1967
- WIP-6006 – Wynder K Frog: "Green Door" b/w "Dancing Frog", 2/1967
- WIP-6007 – Tim Tam and the Turn-Ons: "Wait A Minute" b/w "Ophelia", 4/1967
- WIP-6008 – Jackie Edwards: "Come Back Girl" b/w "Tell Him You Lied", 4/1967
- WIP-6009 – Julien Covey and the Machine: "A Little Bit Hurt" b/w "Sweet Bacon", 4/1967
- WIP-6010 – Joyce Bond: "Do The Teasy" b/w "Sugar", 4/1967
- WIP-6011 – Jimmy Cliff: "I Got A Feeling" b/w "Hard Road To Travel", 5/1967
- WIP-6012 – Jackie and Millie: "In a Dream" b/w "Ooh, Ooh", 6/1967
- WIP-6013 – The Bill Shepherd Sound: "Whistling Sailor" b/w "March of the Seven Seas", 1967
- WIP-6014 – Wynder K Frog: "I'm A Man" b/w "Shook Shimmy And Shake", 6/1967
- WIP-6016 – Nirvana: "Tiny Goddess" b/w "I Believe in Magic", 7/1967
- WIP-6017 – Traffic: "Hole in My Shoe" b/w "Smiling Phases", 8/1967 (early issues in picture sleeve; UK #2, September 1967)
- WIP-6018 – Joyce Bond: "This Train" b/w "Not So With Me", 8/1967
- WIP-6019 – Art: "What's That Sound (For What It's Worth)" b/w "Rome Take Away Three", 7/1967
- WIP-6020 – Nirvana: "Pentecost Hotel" b/w "Feelin' Shattered", 9/1967
- WIP-6021 – Millie Small: "I Am In Love" b/w "You Better Forget", 10/1967
- WIP-6022 – Spooky Tooth: "Sunshine Help Me" b/w "Weird", 1/1968
- WIP-6023 – The Smoke: "It Could Be Wonderful" b/w "Have Some More Tea", 11/1967
- WIP-6024 – Jimmy Cliff: "That's The Way Life Goes" b/w "Thank You", 10/1967
- WIP-6025 – Traffic: "Here We Go Round The Mulberry Bush" b/w "Coloured Rain", 11/1967 (first 100,000 in picture sleeve) (UK #8, December 1967)
- WIP-6026 – Jackie Edwards: "Julie On My Mind" b/w "If This Is Heaven", 2/1968
- WIP-6027 – Kytes: "Running In The Water" b/w "The End Of The Day", 2/1968
- WIP-6028 – Peter Sarstedt: "I Must Go On" b/w "Mary Jane", 1/1968
- WIP-6029 – Nirvana: "Rainbow Chaser" b/w "Flashbulb", 3/1968 (UK #34, May 1968)
- WIP-6030 – Traffic: "No Face, No Name And No Number" b/w "Roamin' Thru' The Gloamin' With 40,000 Headmen", 2/1968 (UK #40, March 1968)
- WIP-6031 – The Smoke: "Utterly Simple" b/w "Sydney Gill", 3/1968 (not issued)
- WIP-6032 – Dave Mason: "Just For You" b/w "Little Woman", 2/1968
- WIP-6033 – Emil Dean: "This Is Our Anniversary" b/w "Lonely Boy", 3/1968
- WIP-6034 – Santos Morados: "Tonopah" b/w "Anytime", 3/1968
- WIP-6035 – Sarolta: "Open Your Hands" b/w "L.O.V.E.", 4/1968
- WIP-6036 – Jackie Edwards & Jimmy Cliff: "Set Me Free" b/w "Here I Come", 6/1968
- WIP-6037 – Spooky Tooth: "Love Really Changed Me" b/w "Luther's Groove", 6/1968
- WIP-6038 – Nirvana: "Girl In The Park" b/w "C Side In Ocho Rios", 6/1968
- WIP-6039 – Jimmy Cliff: "Waterfall" b/w "Reward", 7/1968
- WIP-6040 – Soul People: "Hummin'" b/w "Soul Drink", 7/1968
- WIP-6041 – Traffic: "You Can All Join In" b/w "Withering Tree", 8/1968 (promo/export issue only – see reference)
- WIP-6041 – Traffic: "Feeling Alright?" b/w "Withering Tree", 9/1968
- WIP-6042 – Jackie Edwards: "You My Girl" b/w Heaven Only Knows, 1968
- WIP-6043 – Sue and Sunny: "Set Me Free" b/w Nirvana Orchestra: "City Of The South", 8/1968
- WIP-6043 – Jethro Tull: "A Song for Jeffrey" b/w "One for John Gee", 27/9/1968
- WIP-6044 – Wynder K Frog: "Jumpin' Jack Flash" b/w "Baldy", 8/1968
- WIP-6045 – Nirvana: "All Of Us (The Touchables)" b/w "Trapeze", 11/1968
- WIP-6046 – Spooky Tooth: "The Weight" b/w "Do Right People", 9/1968
- WIP-6047 – Fairport Convention: "Meet on the Ledge" b/w "Throwaway Street Puzzle", 12/1968
- WIP-6048 – Jethro Tull: "Love Story" b/w "Christmas Song", 29/11/1968 (UK #29, January 1969)
- WIP-6049 – Heavy Jelly: "I Keep Singing That Same Old Song" b/w "Blue", 1/1969
- WIP-6050 – Traffic: "Medicated Goo" b/w "Shanghai Noodle Factory", 12/1968
- WIP-6051 – Joyce Bond: "Ob-La-Di, Ob-La-Da" b/w Joyce Bond Review: "Robin Hood Rides Again", 12/1968
- WIP-6052 – Nirvana: "Wings Of Love" b/w "Requiem To John Coltrane", 1/1969
- WIP-6053 – Bob & Earl: "Harlem Shuffle" b/w "I'll Keep Running Back", 1/1969 (UK #7, March 1969)
- WIP-6054 – Free: "Broad Daylight" b/w "The Worm", March 1969
- WIP-6055 – Clouds: "Make No Bones About It" b/w "Heritage", 3/1969
- WIP-6056 – Jethro Tull: "Living in the Past" b/w "Driving Song", 2/5/1969 (UK #3, May 1969)
- WIP-6057 – Nirvana: "Oh! What a Performance" b/w "Darling Darlane", 5/1969
- WIP-6058 – Spooky Tooth: "That Was Only Yesterday" b/w "Oh! Pretty Woman", 1969 (believed not issued in UK; Dutch picture sleeve issues exist with this catalogue number.)
- WIP-6059 – Blodwyn Pig: "Dear Jill" b/w "Sweet Caroline", 5/1969
- WIP-6060 – Spooky Tooth: "Son Of Your Father" b/w "I've Got Enough Heartache", 6/1969
- WIP-6061 – The Anglos: "Incense" b/w "You're Fooling Me", 5/1969
- WIP-6062 – Free: "I'll Be Creeping" b/w "Sugar for Mr. Morrison", June 1969
- WIP-6064 – Fairport Convention: "Si Tu Dois Partir" b/w "Genesis Hall", 7/1969 (UK #21, July 1969)
- WIP-6065 – Not issued
- WIP-6066 – Hard Meat: "Rain" b/w "Burning Up Years", 8/1969
- WIP-6067 – Clouds: "Scrapbook" b/w "The Carpenter", 9/1969
- WIP-6068 – Jethro Tull: "Bouree" b/w "Fat Man", 1969 (not issued in UK; French and Belgian issues exist with this catalogue number.)
- WIP-6069 – Blodwyn Pig: "Walk On The Water" b/w "Summer Day", 9/1969
- WIP-6070 – Jethro Tull: "Sweet Dream" b/w "17", 10/10/1969 (green Chrysalis label) (UK #7, November 1969)
- WIP-6071 – King Crimson: "The Court of the Crimson King Part One" b/w "The Court of the Crimson King Part Two", 10/1969
- WIP-6072 – Mott The Hoople: "Rock and Roll Queen" b/w "Road To Birmingham", 10/1969
- WIP-6073 – Not issued
- WIP-6074 – Not issued

(Series continued under heading Singles in the 1970s, below.)

==== IEP series ====
Four track EPs in the 1960s

- IEP 701 – Jackie Edwards: Sacred Hymns, Vol. 1, 1966
- IEP 702 – Jackie Edwards: Sacred Hymns, Vol. 2, 1966
- IEP 703 – Dioris Valladares and his Orchestra: Meringue!
- IEP 704 – Ernest Ranglin and the G.B's: Just A Little Walk
- IEP 705 – Millie and Her Boyfriends: Roy – Jackie – Owen, 1963
- IEP 706 – Ike & Tina Turner: The Soul of Ike and Tina Turner (Sue subsidiary)
- IEP 707 – Bam & Charlie Hyatt: Live At The State Theatre Kingston Jamaica – Rass!, 1966
- IEP 708 – Jackie Edwards: Hush, 1966
- IEP 709 – Chris Farlowe: Stormy Monday, 1966
- IEP 710 – Otis Redding: Early Otis Redding
- IEP 711 – Z. Z. Hill / Intentions: Gimmie Gimmie (Sue subsidiary)

=== LPs of the 1960s ===
For LPs the label chose the prefix ILP (meaning: Island Long Player) with a number of three figures beginning with 900, later supplemented by ILPS (meaning: Island Long Player Stereo) to distinguish between Mono and Stereo records. Some records were issued in both forms. For those records in stereo, the catalogue number was changed by adding a fourth figure (e.g.: ILP 970 was the mono equivalent of ILPS 9070).

==== ILP/ILPS series ====
- ILP 901 – Keith and Enid: Keith and Enid Sing, 1964

the above was the only Island LP released with a black and silver 'flaming sun' label. All following Island LPs had the white and red 'flaming sun' label. The Sue label LPs were incorporated into the island numerical system, and had the yellow and red 'bow tie' labels.

- ILP 902 – The Mighty Sparrow: The Slave, 1964
- ILP 903 – Derrick Morgan: Forward March, 1964
- ILP 904 – Silver Stars Steel Band: Silver Stars Steel Band, 1964
- ILP 905 – Bryon Lee & The Dragonaires: Caribbean Joyride, 1964
- ILP 906 – Jackie Edwards: The Most of Wilfred Jackie Edwards, 1964
- ILP 907 – Jimmy McGriff: I've Got a Woman, (Sue label) 1964
- ILP 908 – Jimmy McGriff: Gospel Time, (Sue label; reissue of One of Mine) 1964
- ILP 909 – Ernest Ranglin: Wranglin' , 1964
- ILP 910 – V.A.: This Is Blue Beat, 1964
- ILP 911 – Inez and Charlie Foxx: Mockingbird, (Sue label) 1964
- ILP 912 – Jackie Edwards: Stand Up For Jesus, 1965
- ILP 913 – The Soul Sisters: The Soul Sisters, (Sue label) 1965
- ILP 914 – V.A.: The Birth of Ska, 1962 (Unreleased UK version of Treasure Isle LP, white label only)
- ILP 915 – Ernest Ranglin: Reflections, 1965
- ILP 916 – The Vagabonds: The Fabulous Vagabonds, 1965
- ILP 917 – Huey Piano Smith & The Clowns: Rockin' Pneumonia & The Boogie Woogie Flu, (Sue label) 1965
- ILP 918 – Elmore James: The Best of Elmore James, (Sue label) 1965
- ILP 919 – V.A.: Pure Blues, Vol. 1, (Sue label) 1965
- ILP 920 – V.A.: 50 Minutes 24 Seconds Of Recorded Dynamite (Sue label), 1965
- ILP 921 – V.A.: We Sing The Blues (Sue Label), 1965
- ILP 922 – Larry Williams: On Stage, (Sue label) 1965
- ILP 923 – The Blues Busters: Behold, 1965
- ILP 924 – Lee Dorsey: The Best of Lee Dorsey, (Sue label) 1965
- ILP 925 – V.A.: The Sue Story!, 1965
- ILP 926 – Harold McNair: Affectionate Fink, 1965
- ILP 927 – Elmore James: Memorial Album, (Sue label) 1965
- ILP 928 – Derrick Harriott: The Best of Derrick Harriott, 1965
- ILP 929 – Billie Holiday: Last Live Recording, 1965 (UK sleeves printed but album released on Sonet Records)
- ILP 930 – V.A.: Ska at the Jamaican Playboy Club, 1966
- ILP 931 – Jackie Edwards: Come on Home, 1965/1966
- ILP 932 – Charlie Hyatt: Kiss Me Neck It's Charles Hyatt, 1966
- ILP 933 – V.A.: The Sue Story, Vol. 2, (Sue label) 1966
- ILP 934 – V.A.: Soul '66, 1966
- ILP 935 – Billy Preston: The Most Exciting Organ Ever (Sue label), 1965
- ILP 936 – Jackie Edwards: The Best of Jackie Edwards, 1966
- ILP 937 – The Righteous Brothers: In Action, (Sue label) 1966
- ILP 938 – V.A.: The Sue Story, Vol. 3, (Sue label) 1966
- ILP 939 – John Foster: John Foster Sings, 1966
- ILP 940 – Jackie Edwards: By Demand, 1966
- ILP 941 – Jackie Edwards and Millie Small: Pledging My Love, 1966
- ILP 942 – Robert Parker: Barefootin' , 1966
- ILP 943 – V.A.: Doctor Soul, 1966
- ILP 944 – Wynder K Frog: Sunshine Superfrog, 1966
- ILP 945 – V.A.: Pakistani Soul Session, 1966
- ILP 946 – Ray Barretto: El Watusi, 1966
- ILP 947 – The Settlers: Early Settlers, 1966
- ILP 948 – V.A.: Club Ska '67, (W.I.R.L. label) 1967
- ILP 949 – Barbara Lynn: Barbara Lynn Story, (Sue label) 1967
- ILP 950 – The Wallace Brothers: Soul Connection, (Sue label) 1967
- ILP 951 – Bob & Earl: Harlem Shuffle, (Sue label) 1967

At this point, Island introduced the first of three pink label designs. These next releases had the first pink label, with an orange and black 'eyeball' logo on the left, unless otherwise indicated:

- ILP 952 – John Martyn: London Conversation, 1967
- ILP 953 – Millie Small: The Best of Millie Small, 1967
- ILP 954 – V.A.: Dr. Kitch, (only on the red/white label) 1967
- ILP 955 – Derrick Harriott: Rock Steady Party, 1967
- ILP 956 – V.A.: Club Ska '67, Vol. Two, (W.I.R.L. label) 1967
- ILP 957 – Hopeton Lewis: Take It Easy, 1967
- ILP 958 – V.A.: Duke Reid's Rock Steady, 1967 (Trojan Records, orange label)
- ILP 959/ILPS 9059 – Nirvana: The Story of Simon Simopath, 1967
- ILP 960/ILPS 9060 – Jackie Edwards: Premature Golden Sands, 1967
- ILP 961/ILPS 9061 – Traffic: Mr. Fantasy, 1967
- ILP 962 – Jimmy Cliff: Hard Road To Travel, 1967
- ILP 963 – Jackie Edwards and Millie Small: The Best of Jackie & Millie, 1967
- ILP 964 – V.A.: Club Soul, 1967
- ILP 965 – V.A.: Club Rock Steady, 1967
- ILP 966/ILPS 9066 – V.A.: British Blue-Eyed Soul, 1967
- ILP 967 – Art: Supernatural Fairy Tales, 1967
- ILP 968 – Joyce Bond: Soul and Ska, 1967
- ILP 969 – Lynn Taitt & The Jets: Sounds Rocksteady, 1967
- ILP 970/ILPS 9070 – The Spencer Davis Group: The Best of the Spencer Davis Group featuring Stevie Winwood, 1967
- ILP 971 – Granville Williams Orchestra: Hi-Life, 1967
- ILP 972 – Sonny Burke: The Sounds of Sonny Burke, 1967
- ILP 973 – (not used)
- ILP 974 – Bobby Bland: A Touch of the Blues, 1967
- ILP 975 – O.V. Wright: 8 Men and 4 Women, 1967
- ILP 976 – V.A.: The Duke and the Peacock, 1967
- ILP 977 – V.A.: Guy Stevens' Testament of Rock and Roll, 1967
- ILP 978 – V.A.: Put It On, It's Rock Steady, 1967/68
- ILPS 9079 – Spontaneous Music Ensemble: Karyobin Are the Imaginary Birds Said To Live In Paradise, 1968 (Island/Hexagram label)
- ILPS 9080 – Spooky Tooth: It's All About, 1968
- ILPS 9081 – Traffic: Traffic, 1968
- ILPS 9082 – Wynder K Frog: Out of the Flying Pan, 1968
- ILP 983 – Derrick Harriott and the Crystallites: The Best of Derrick Harriott, Vol. 2, 1968
- ILP 984 – The Merrymen: Caribbean Treasure Chest, 1968
- ILP 985/ILPS 9085 – Jethro Tull: This Was, 1968 (mono withdrawn)
- ILP 986 – Bunnie Lee's All Stars: Leaping With Mr. Lee, 1968
- ILPS 9087 – Nirvana: All of Us, 1968
- ILPS 9088 – Tramline: Somewhere Down the Line, 1968
- ILPS 9089 – Free: Tons of Sobs, 1969;
- ILP 990 – Derrick Morgan: Derrick Morgan & Friends, 1969
- ILPS 9091 – John Martyn: The Tumbler, 1969
- ILPS 9092 – Fairport Convention: What We Did on Our Holidays, 1968
- ILP 993 – V.A.: The Unfolding of the Book of Life (Volume One), 1969

At this point, monaural releases are discontinued. Releases below this text are in stereophonic only.

- ILPS 9094 – V.A.: British Blues Adventures, Vol. 1, 1969 (France only)
- ILPS 9095 – Tramline: Moves of Vegetable Centuries, 1969
- ILPS 9096 – Bama Winds: Windy, 1969
- ILPS 9097 – Traffic: Last Exit, 1969
- ILPS 9098 – Spooky Tooth: Spooky Two, 1969
- ILPS 9099 – White Noise: An Electric Storm, 1969
- ILPS 9100 – Clouds: Scrapbook, 1969
- ILPS 9101 – Blodwyn Pig: Ahead Rings Out, 1969

At this point, Island introduced the second pink label. It is known as the 'black block' label, as it featured a thick, block-like letter 'i' at the bottom, dotted by a black eyeball in the centre of the label. This was very quickly replaced by the third pink label, featuring a small white letter 'i' logo. Due to variations in catalogue number assignation and the actual release dates of the records, there is a small cross-over period between the three pink label designs. The original label designs for the following LPs are detailed in parentheses.

- ILPS 9102 – Fairport Convention: Unhalfbricking, 1969 (black block label)
- ILPS 9103 – Jethro Tull: Stand Up, 1969 (eyeball label)
- ILPS 9104 – Free: Free, 1969 (white i label)
- ILPS 9105 – Nick Drake: Five Leaves Left, 1969 (black block label)
- ILPS 9106 – Dr. Strangely Strange: Kip of the Serenes, 1969 (eyeball label)

All following LPs were originally issued on the third pink label, with the white 'i' logo.

- ILPS 9107 – Spooky Tooth: Ceremony, 1969
- ILPS 9108 – Mott the Hoople: Mott the Hoople, 1969
- ILPS 9109 – V.A.: British Blues Adventures, Vol. 2, 1969 (France only)
- ILPS 9110 – Quintessence: In Blissful Company, 1969
- ILPS 9111 – King Crimson: In the Court of the Crimson King, 1969
- ILPS 9112 – Traffic: Best of Traffic, 1969
- ILPS 9113 – John & Beverley Martyn: Stormbringer!, 1970
- ILPS 9114 – Renaissance: Renaissance, 1969
- ILPS 9115 – Fairport Convention: Liege & Lief, 1969

==== IWP/IWPS series ====
During the same period Island Records released some sampler albums with the prefixes IWP/IWPS:

- IWPS 2 – You Can All Join In, 1969
- IWP 3 – This Is Sue!, 1969
- IWPS 4 – Jackie Edwards: Put Your Tears Away, 1969
- IWP 5 – This Is Blues, 1969
- IWPS 6 – Nice Enough To Eat, 1969

== UK releases 1970s ==
=== Singles in the 1970s ===
==== Island WIP series ====
The first release in 1970, WIP-6075, had the "block" label design, but the very next one, "John The Baptist" by John & Beverley Martyn, featured a third pink label design, characterised by a large white letter "i" on the left-hand side. This design was used for the remaining pink label issues, interrupted with increasing frequency by green Chrysalis label releases, as denoted in the listing below. Bronze label singles by artists such as Tony Hazzard and Uriah Heep began to appear in the Island listing from May 1971, for a couple of years until that label's own BRO- series was begun. An American record label, Blue Thumb, also released a small number of UK singles with WIP-series numbers in 1972/3. The one-off catalogue number WI-4002 was given to the flexi-single "Let There Be Drums" which came with the album Rock On by The Bunch in 1972.

In the second half of the decade the character of the label began to change and this is reflected in its singles releases from about 1976 onwards. There was a conscious move back towards the label's roots in Jamaican music in the form of commercial reggae aimed at the rock/pop audience. Names such as Bob Marley & the Wailers, Toots & the Maytals and Third World crop up in the listings with increasing frequency. They and others enjoyed considerable commercial success in the U.K. market. There is evidence too of an increasing number of one-off licensing deals featuring (mainly American) soul and R & B singers (e.g. Barbara Pennington and Betty Davis). Island also joined a growing trend amongst U.K.-based record companies at that time towards exploitation of its own back catalogue, and a substantial programme of reissues was undertaken, especially of ska and reggae titles, most of which seem to have been aimed at a small, specialist audience and did not enjoy widespread commercial success.

Also in 1976, another American record label, Shelter Records, began to issue U.K. singles through Island, which received WIP-series catalogue numbers. Artists included the Dwight Twilley Band, J.J. Cale and Tom Petty & the Heartbreakers, the last-named of whom enjoyed some success on the coat-tails of punk. Finally, the Black Swan label was reactivated for certain reggae-styled releases, some of which appeared with WIP-series numbers.

Some numbers were assigned to releases from outside of the United Kingdom; these are noted below.

(N.B. For reasons of continuity, this section of the discography also includes singles numbered in the WIP 6xxx series which were released between 1980 and 1983.)

- WIP 6075 – Quintessence: "Notting Hill Gate" b/w "Move Into The Light", 1/1970
- WIP 6076 – John & Beverley Martyn: "John The Baptist" b/w "The Ocean", 1/1970
- WIP 6077 – Jethro Tull: "The Witch's Promise" b/w "Teacher", 16/1/1970 (green Chrysalis label, some in picture sleeve)
- WIP 6078 – Blodwyn Pig: "Same Old Story" b/w "Slow Down", 1/1970 (green Chrysalis label)
- WIP 6079 – Renaissance: "Island" b/w "The Sea", 1/1970
- WIP 6080 – King Crimson: "Cat Food" b/w "Groon", 13/3/1970 (picture sleeve)
- WIP 6081 – Jethro Tull: "Inside" b/w "Alive And Well And Living In", 24/4/1970 (green Chrysalis label)
- WIP 6082 – Free: "All Right Now" b/w "Mouthful of Grass", 5/1970 (reissued in 1973 with same catalogue number, but "pink rim" labels
- WIP 6083 – If: "Raise The Level Of Your Conscious Mind" b/w "I'm Reaching Out On All Sides", 5/1970
- WIP 6084 – Spooky Tooth: "Nobody There At All" b/w Art: "Room With A View", 6/1970 (withdrawn, white-label/promo copies exist)
- WIP 6085 – Fotheringay: "Peace In The End" b/w "Winter Winds", 6/1970
- WIP 6086 – Cat Stevens: "Lady d'Arbanville" b/w "Time/Fill My Eyes", 6/1970 (some in picture sleeve, which miscredits b-side as "Katmandu")
- WIP 6087 – Jimmy Cliff: "Wild World" b/w "Be Aware", 8/1970
- WIP 6088 – High Broom: "Dancing In The Moonlight" b/w "Percy's On The Run", 8/1970
- WIP 6089 – Fairport Convention: "Now Be Thankful" b/w "Sir B. McKenzie's Daughter's Lament For The 77th Mounted Lancers' Retreat From The Straits Of Loch Knombe, In The Year Of Our Lord 1727, On The Occasion Of The Announcement Of Her Marriage To The Laird Of Kinleakie", 9/1970

WIP-6089 was the last single to be released with a pink label. The next single, WIP-6090 was on the Chrysalis label, but from the one after that, WIP 6091, the "pink rim" palm tree label was introduced.

- WIP 6090 – Tír na Nóg: "I'm Happy To Be (On This Mountain) b/w Let My Love Grow, 10/1970 (green Chrysalis label)
- WIP 6091 – The Alan Bown!: "Pyramid" b/w "Crash Landing", 10/1970
- WIP 6092 – Cat Stevens: "Father and Son" b/w "Moon Shadow", 9/1970
- WIP 6093 – Free: "The Stealer" b/w "Lying In The Sunshine", 11/1970
- WIP 6094 – Not released
- WIP 6095 – Not released
- WIP 6096 – Bronco: "Lazy Now" b/w "A Matter Of Perspective", 11/1970
- WIP 6097 – Jimmy Cliff: "Synthetic World" b/w "I Go To Pieces", 12/1970
- WIP 6098 – Jethro Tull: "Lick Your Fingers Clean" b/w "Up To Me" (number allocated but not released)
- WIP 6099 – Not released
- WIP 6100 – Free: "My Brother Jake" b/w "Only My Soul", 4/1971
- WIP 6101 – Mike Heron: "Call Me Diamond" b/w "Lady Wonder", 5/1971 (some in picture sleeve)
- WIP 6102 – Cat Stevens: "Tuesday's Dead" b/w "Miles From Nowhere", 9/1971
- WIP 6103 – Jimmy Cliff: "Goodbye Yesterday" b/w "Breakdown", 5/1971
- WIP 6104 – Richard Barnes: "Coldwater Morning" b/w "Suddenly I Know", 5/1971 (Bronze label)
- WIP 6105 – Mott the Hoople: "Midnight Lady" b/w "The Debt", 7/1971 (picture sleeve)
- WIP 6106 – Jethro Tull: "Life Is A Long Song" EP ("Life Is A Long Song"/"Up The Pool" b/w "Dr. Bogenbroom"/"From Later"/"Nursie"), 19/9/1971 (green Chrysalis label, picture sleeve)
- WIP 6108 – Paladin: "Anyway" b/w "Giving All My Love", 7/1971 (Bronze label)
- WIP 6109 – Luther Grosvenor: "Here Comes The Queen" b/w "Heavy Day", 9/1971
- WIP 6110 – Jimmy Cliff: "Sitting In Limbo" b/w "The Bigger They Come The Harder They Fall", 8/1971
- WIP 6111 – Uriah Heep: "Look At Yourself" b/w "Simon The Bullet Freak", 9/1971 (Bronze label)
- WIP 6112 – Mott the Hoople: "Downtown" b/w "Home", 9/1971
- WIP 6113 – Tony Hazzard: "Woman In The West" b/w "Hangover Blues", 1971 (Bronze label)
- WIP 6115 – Heads Hands & Feet: "Warming Up The Band" b/w "Silver Mine", 11/1971
- WIP 6116 – John Martyn: "May You Never" b/w "Just Now", 11/1971
- WIP 6117 – Not released
- WIP 6118 – Not released
- WIP 6119 – Mountain: "Roll Over Beethoven" b/w "Crossroader", 12/1971
- WIP 6120 – The Sutherland Brothers Band: "The Pie" b/w "Long Long Day", 1/1972 (picture sleeve)
- WIP 6121 – Cat Stevens: "Morning Has Broken" b/w I Want To Live In A Wigwam, 1/1972
- WIP 6122 – Claire Hamill: "When I Was A Child" b/w "Alice In The Streets Of Darlington", 1/1972 (picture sleeve)
- WIP 6123 – Tony Hazzard: "Blue Movie Man" b/w "Abbot of the Vale", 1/1972 (Bronze label)
- WIP 6124 – Luther Grosvenor: "All The People" b/w "Waiting", 2/1972
- WIP 6125 – Vinegar Joe: "Never Met A Dog (That Took To Me)" b/w "Speed Queen of Ventura", 2/1972
- WIP 6126 – Uriah Heep: "The Wizard" b/w "Gypsy", 3/1972 (Bronze label)
- WIP 6127 – Jim Capaldi: "Eve" b/w "Going Down Slow All The Way", 3/1972
- WIP 6128 – Fairport Convention: "John Lee" b/w "The Time Is Near", 2/1972 (picture sleeve)
- WIP 6129 – Free: "Little Bit Of Love" b/w "Sail On", 5/1972
- WIP 6130 – The Bunch: "When Will I Be Loved" b/w "Willie and the Hand Jive", 4/1972
- WIP 6131 – Mike McGear: "Woman" b/w "Kill", 4/1972
- WIP 6132 – Jimmy Cliff and Jamaica: "Trapped" b/w "Struggling Man", 4/1972
- WIP 6133 – Claire Hamill: "Baseball Blues" b/w "Smile Your Blues Away", 5/1972
- WIP 6134 – Not released
- WIP 6135 – Not released
- WIP 6136 – The Sutherland Brothers Band: "Sailing" b/w "Who's Crying Now", 1972
- WIP 6137 – Not released
- WIP 6138 – Picture sleeve exists bearing this catalogue number with details of the next entry (i.e. Jimmy Cliff: "The Harder They Come" b/w "Many Rivers To Cross") – see http://www.45cat.com/record/wip6139
- WIP 6139 – Jimmy Cliff: "The Harder They Come" b/w "Many Rivers To Cross", 7/1972
- WIP 6140 – Uriah Heep: "Easy Livin'" b/w "Why", 7/1972 (Bronze label)
- WIP 6141 – Pass of Arms (soundtrack) EP, featuring Sandy Denny: "Here In Silence" b/w "Man of Iron", plus poem "Strange Meeting" read by Christopher Logue, 9/1972 (picture sleeve)
- WIP 6142 – Sandy Denny: "Listen, Listen" b/w "Tomorrow Is a Long Time", 10/1972
- WIP 6143 – The Crusaders: "Put It Where You Want It" b/w "Mosadi Woman", 1/1973 (Blue Thumb label)
- WIP 6144 – Roxy Music: "Virginia Plain" b/w "The Numberer", 8/1972
- WIP 6145 – The Incredible String Band: "Black Jack David" b/w "Moon Hang Low", 11/1972
- WIP 6146 – Free: "Wishing Well" b/w "Let Me Show You", 12/1972
- WIP 6147 – Sutherland Brothers: "Lady Like You" b/w "Annie", 1972
- WIP 6148 – Vinegar Joe: "Rock 'n' Roll Gypsies" b/w "So Long", 11/1972
- WIP 6149 – Hackensack: "Moving On" b/w "River Boat", 12/1972
- WIP 6150 – Not released
- WIP 6151 – P.C. Plod: "W.P.C. Hodges" b/w "B Side Yourself With Plod", 24/11/1972 (die-cut picture sleeve. P.C. Plod was John Gorman of The Scaffold – see next entry.)
- WIP 6151 – John Gorman: "W.P.C. Hodges" b/w "I Remember", 11/5/1973 (reissue of previous entry with different b-side)
- WIP 6152 – Cat Stevens: "Can't Keep It In" b/w "Crab Dance", 11/1972 (also pressed with later "orange palm" label)
- WIP 6153 – Amazing Blondel – "Alleluia (Cantus Firmus To Counterpoint)" b/w "Safety In God Alone", 12/1972
- WIP 6154 – Claire Hamill: "Speedbreaker" b/w "The Artist", 2/1973
- WIP 6155 – Fairport Convention: "Rosie" b/w "Knights Of The Road", 1/1973
- WIP 6156 – Mark Allain: "Be Mine" b/w "Best Friend", 1/1973
- WIP 6157 – Sutherland Brothers and Quiver: "(I Don't Want to Love You But) You Got Me Anyway" b/w "Not Fade Away", 2/1973
- WIP 6158 – The Incredible String Band: "At The Lighthouse Dance" b/w "Jigs", 2/1973
- WIP 6159 – Roxy Music: "Pyjamarama" b/w "The Pride And The Pain", 2/1973
- WIP 6160 – Free: "Travellin' In Style" b/w "Easy On My Soul", 3/1973
- WIP 6161 – Rabbit: "Broken Arrows" b/w "Blues My Guitar", 4/1973
- WIP 6162 – A Foot in Coldwater: "(Isn't Love Unkind) In My Life" b/w "Deep Freeze", 3/1973
- WIP 6163 – Cat Stevens: "The Hurt" b/w "Silent Sunlight", 7/1973
- WIP 6164 – The Wailers: "Concrete Jungle" b/w "Reincarnation Soul", 6/1973
- WIP 6165 – Jim Capaldi: "Tricky Dicky Rides Again" b/w "Oh How We Danced", 6/1973
- WIP 6166 – Not released
- WIP 6167 – The Wailers: "Get Up, Stand Up" b/w "Slave Driver", 9/1973
- WIP 6168 – Spooky Tooth: "All Sewn Up" b/w "As Long As The World Keeps Turning", 10/1973
- WIP 6169 – Jimmy Cliff: "Struggling Man" b/w "Many Rivers To Cross", 1973
- WIP 6170 – Bryan Ferry: "A Hard Rain's A Gonna Fall" b/w "2HB", 9/1973
- WIP 6171 – The Pointer Sisters – "Yes We Can" b/w "Jada", 11/1973 (Blue Thumb label)
- WIP 6173 – Roxy Music: "Street Life" b/w "Hula Kula", 11/1973
- WIP 6174 – Vinegar Joe: "Black Smoke From The Calumet" b/w "Long Way Round", 10/1973
- WIP 6175 – Bryan Ferry: "These Foolish Things" b/w "Chance Meeting" (not issued)
- WIP 6176 – Sandy Denny: "Whispering Grass" b/w "Friends", 11/1973 (some in picture sleeve)
- WIP 6177 – Not released
- WIP 6178 – Eno: "Seven Deadly Finns" b/w "Later On", 3/1974
- WIP 6179 – The Heptones: "Book Of Rules" b/w "Book Of Rules (version)", 1973
- WIP 6180 – Nirvana: "Rainbow Chaser" b/w "Tiny Goddess" (Reissue – released 8/1976 on the "orange palm" label with picture sleeve in the "Then!.. ...Now!" series. Promo copies on "pink rim" label exist, suggesting that release was originally scheduled for an earlier date.)
- WIP 6181 – Zap Pow: "This Is Reggae Music" b/w "Break Down The Barriers", 2/1974
- WIP 6182 – Sutherland Brothers and Quiver: "Dream Kid" b/w "Don't Mess Up", 1/1974
- WIP 6183 – Not released
- WIP 6184 – Not released
- WIP 6185 – Owen Gray: "Jealous Guy" b/w "Please Don't Let Me Go", 2/1974
- WIP 6186 – Richard and Linda Thompson: "I Want To See The Bright Lights Tonight" b/w "When I Get To The Border", 1/1974
- WIP 6187 – Elkie Brooks: "Rescue Me" b/w "Sweet Nuthin's", 2/1974
- WIP 6188 – Bob Dylan: "On A Night Like This" b/w "Forever Young", 2/1974
- WIP 6189 – King Crimson: "The Night Watch" b/w "The Great Deceiver", 2/1974
- WIP 6190 – Cat Stevens: "Oh Very Young" b/w "100 I Dream", 3/1974
- WIP 6191 – Bad Company: "Can't Get Enough" b/w "Little Miss Fortune", 5/1974
- WIP 6192 – Tranquility: "Midnight Fortune" b/w "One Day Lady", 4/1974
- WIP 6193 – Sparks: "This Town Ain't Big Enough For Both Of Us" b/w "Barbecutie", 4/1974
- WIP 6194 – Kevin Ayers: "The Up Song" b/w "Everybody's Sometime and Some People's All The Time Blues", 4/1974
- WIP 6195 – Sandy Denny: "Like an Old Fashioned Waltz" (release cancelled)
- WIP 6196 – Bryan Ferry: "The In Crowd" b/w "Chance Meeting", 5/1974 (picture sleeve)
- WIP 6197 – Andy Mackay: "Ride Of The Valkyries" b/w "Time Regained", 6/1974
- WIP 6198 – Jim Capaldi: "It's All Up to You" b/w "Whale Meat Again", 6/1974
- WIP 6199 – Traffic: "Hole In My Shoe" b/w "Here We Go Round The Mulberry Bush", 5/1974 (reissue)
- WIP 6200 – Bryn Haworth: "Grappenhall Rag" b/w "I Won't Lie (This Time)", 1974
- WIP 6201 – Kevin Ayers: "After The Show" b/w "Thank You Very Much", 7/1974
- WIP 6202 – John Cale: "The Man Who Couldn't Afford To Orgy" b/w "Sylvia Said", 7/1974
- WIP 6203 – Sparks: "Amateur Hour" b/w "Lost And Found", 7/1974
- WIP 6204 – Not released
- WIP 6205 – Bryan Ferry: "Smoke Gets In Your Eyes" b/w "Another Time, Another Place", 8/1974
- WIP 6206 – Cat Stevens: "Another Saturday Night" b/w "Home In The Sky", 8/1974 (picture sleeve)
- WIP 6207 – Traffic: "Walking In The Wind" b/w "Walking In The Wind (Instrumental)", 10/1974
- WIP 6208 – Roxy Music: "All I Want Is You" b/w "Your Application's Failed", 10/1974
- WIP 6209 – Sutherland Brothers and Quiver: "Saviour In The Rain" b/w "Silver Sister", 1974
- WIP 6210 – Not released
- WIP 6211 – Sparks: "Never Turn Your Back On Mother Earth" b/w "Alabamy Right", 10/1974 (picture sleeve)
- WIP 6212 – Bob Marley & The Wailers: "So Jah Seh" b/w "Natty Dread", 1974 (reissued 6/1975 and repromoted with "Natty Dread" as the A-side, picture sleeve on reissue only)
- WIP 6213 – Georgie Fame: "Everlovin' Woman" b/w "That Ol' Rock'n'Roll", 1974
- WIP 6214 – Rik Kenton: "Bungalow Love" b/w "Lay It On You", 1974
- WIP 6215 – Bob Dylan & The Band: "It Ain't Me Babe" b/w "All Along The Watchtower", 11/1974
- WIP 6216 – Ronnie Lane: "What Went Down (That Night With You)" b/w "Lovely", 11/1974
- WIP 6217 – Stonedelight: "Reach Out For Me" b/w "Reach Out For Me (Version)", 1/1975
- WIP 6218 – Georgie Fame: "Ali Shuffle" b/w "Round Two", 12/1974
- WIP 6219 – Not released
- WIP 6220 – Richard and Linda Thompson: "Hokey Pokey (The Ice Cream Song)" b/w "I'll Regret It All In The Morning", 2/1975
- WIP 6221 – Sparks: "Something For The Girl With Everything" b/w "Marry Me", 1/1975
- WIP 6222 – Milk'n'Cookies: "Little, Lost And Innocent" b/w "Good Friends", 2/1975
- WIP 6223 – Bad Company: "Good Lovin' Gone Bad" b/w "Whisky Bottle", 3/1975
- WIP 6224 – Art: "What's That Sound (For What It's Worth)" b/w Flying Anchors, 2/1975
- WIP 6225 – Chris Spedding: "My Bucket's Got a Hole in It" b/w "I Can't Boogie", 2/1975
- WIP 6226 – Augustus Pablo: "King Tubby Meets The Rockers Uptown" b/w Jacob Miller: "Baby I Love You So", 2/1975
- WIP 6227 – The Jess Roden Band: "Under Suspicion" b/w "Ferry Cross", 3/1975
- WIP 6228 – Dave & Ansil Collins: "Gonna Keep On Trying Till I Win Your Love" b/w "Keep On Dubbing", 3/1975
- WIP 6229 – Ronnie Lane's Slim Chance: "Brother Can You Spare A Dime?" b/w "Ain't No Lady", 4/1975
- WIP 6230 – Speedy Keen: "Someone To Love" b/w "Fighting In The Streets", 4/1975
- WIP 6231 – Pete Wingfield: "Eighteen With a Bullet" b/w "Shadow of a Doubt", 6/1975 (Promo-only picture sleeve. Initial pressings with "pink rim" labels, later pressings with "orange palm" labels)
- WIP 6232 – Mike Lesley: "Come Together" b/w "Don't Be So Serious", 5/1975
- WIP 6233 – Eno: "The Lion Sleeps Tonight (Wimoweh)" b/w "I'll Come Running (To Tie Your Shoes)", 6/1975
- WIP 6234 – Bryan Ferry: "You Go To My Head" b/w "Re-make Re-model", 6/1975
- WIP 6235 – Peter Skellern: "Hard Times" b/w "And Then You'll Fall", 7/1975
- WIP 6236 – Sparks: "Get In The Swing" b/w "Profile", 7/1975
- WIP 6237 – Lorna Bennett: "Breakfast In Bed" b/w Scotty & Lorna Bennett: "Skank In Bed", 1975
- WIP 6238 – Cat Stevens: "Two Fine People" b/w "A Bad Penny", 7/1975
- WIP 6239 – Rudie Mowatt: "Love You Baby" b/w "Backside (Dub)", 1975
- WIP 6240 – Bryn Haworth: "Give All You've Got To Give" b/w "Thank The Lord", 7/1975
- WIP 6241 – Fairport Convention: "White Dress" b/w "Tears", 7/1975
- WIP 6242 – Bad Company: "Feel Like Makin' Love" b/w "Wild Fire Women", 8/1975
- WIP 6243 – Andy Mackay: "Wild Weekend" b/w "Walking The Whippet", 8/1975
- WIP 6244 – Bob Marley & The Wailers: "No Woman No Cry" b/w "Kinky Reggae", 8/1975 (initial pressings with "pink rim" labels, later pressings with "orange palm" labels)
- WIP 6245 – Pete Wingfield: "A Whole Pot Of Jelly (For A Little Slice Of Toast)" b/w "Anytime", 1975

WIP 6245 is believed to have been the last single released with "pink rim" labels as subsequent releases appeared with the "orange & blue" palm tree label (referred to in this listing as "orange palm").

- WIP 6246 – Jim Capaldi: "Love Hurts" b/w "Sugar Honey", 10/1975
- WIP 6247 – Speedy Keen: "Bad Boys" b/w "Cold Hand Warm Gun", 9/1975
- WIP 6248 – Roxy Music: "Love Is the Drug" b/w "Sultanesque", 9/1975
- WIP 6249 – Sparks: "Looks, Looks, Looks" b/w "Pineapple", 9/1975
- WIP 6250 – Robert Palmer: "Which Of Us Is The Fool" b/w "Get Outside", 10/1975 (picture sleeve)
- WIP 6251 – Not released
- WIP 6252 – Murray Head: "Say It Ain't So Joe" b/w "Don't Have To", 10/1975 (A DJ Promo version of this single, featuring an edited version of "Say It Ain't So", was released in 1/1976.)
- WIP 6253 – Nasty Pop: "Crow" b/w "Gracie", 1975
- WIP 6254 – Joe South: "To Have, To Hold And Let Go" b/w "Midnight Rainbows", 10/1975
- WIP 6255 – Betty Davis: "Shut Off The Light" b/w "He Was A Big Freak", 10/1975
- WIP 6256 – Third World: "Railroad Track" b/w "Freedom Song", 1975
- WIP 6257 – The Chieftains: "The Timpan Reel" b/w "Samhradh, Samhradh", 11/1975
- WIP 6258 – Ronnie Lane's Slim Chance: "Don't Try'n'Change My Mind" b/w "Well Well Hello (The Party)", 1/1976
- WIP 6259 – Not released
- WIP 6260 – Peter Skellern: "Now That I Need You" b/w "I Guess You Wished You'd Gone Home", 1975
- WIP 6261 – Justin Hinds & The Dominoes: "Carry Go, Bring Come" b/w "Jezebel", 28/11/1975
- WIP 6262 – Roxy Music: "Both Ends Burning" b/w "For Your Pleasure", 12/1975
- WIP 6263 – Bad Company: "Run With The Pack" b/w "Do Right By Your Woman", 3/1976
- WIP 6264 – Burning Spear: "Old Marcus Garvey" b/w "Tradition", 1/1976
- WIP 6265 – Bob Marley & The Wailers: "Jah Live" b/w "Concrete Jungle (live)", 1/1976
- WIP 6266 – The Heptones: "Country Boy" b/w "Love Won't Come Easy", 1/1976
- WIP 6267 – War: "Low Rider" b/w "So", 1/1976
- WIP 6268 – The Chieftains: "Mna Na H Eireann (Women of Ireland)" b/w "The Morning Dew", 1/1976
- WIP 6269 – Toots & the Maytals: "Reggae Got Soul" b/w "Dog War", 2/1976
- WIP 6270 – Eddie and the Hot Rods: "Writing On The Wall" b/w "Cruisin' (In The Lincoln)", 2/1976
- WIP 6271 – Kevin Ayers: "Falling In Love Again" b/w "Everyone Knows The Song", 2/1976
- WIP 6272 – Robert Palmer: "Gimme An Inch" b/w "Pressure Drop", 2/1976
- WIP 6273 – Jay Dee Bryant: "Standing Ovation For Love" b/w "I Want To Thank You Baby", 1976
- WIP 6274 – King Crimson: "21st Century Schizoid Man" b/w "Epitaph", 2/1976 (picture sleeve)
- WIP 6275 – Tyrone Taylor: "Extra, Extra" b/w "Life Table Turning", 1976
- WIP 6276 – Cat Stevens: "Banapple Gas" b/w "Ghost Town", 3/1976
- WIP 6277 – Zap-Pow: "This Is Reggae Music" b/w "Break Down The Barriers", 3/1976
- WIP 6278 – Swamp Dogg: "The Mind Does The Dancing While The Body Pulls The Strings" (edited version) b/w (long version), 1976
- WIP 6279 – Georgie Fame: "Yes Honestly" b/w "Lily", 3/1976
- WIP 6280 – Barbara Pennington: "Running In Another Direction" b/w "Running Away", 1976
- WIP 6281 – The Heptones: "Mama Say" b/w "Love Won't Come Easy", 2/1976
- WIP 6282 – Sparks: "I Want to Hold Your Hand" b/w "England", 3/1976 (promo only?)
- WIP 6282 – Sparks: "I Want To Hold Your Hand" b/w "Under The Table With Her", 1976 (promo only?)
- WIP 6283 – Max Romeo & The Upsetters: "War In A Babylon" b/w "Revelation Dub", 3/1976
- WIP 6284 – Ken LaRue: "Peepin' Juke Box" b/w "Peepin'", 5/3/1976
- WIP 6285 – Jackie Edwards: "Come On Home" b/w "I Feel So Bad", 4/1976
- WIP 6286 – The Jess Roden Band: "You Can Leave Your Hat On" b/w "On A Winner With You", 3/1976
- WIP 6287 – Eddie Jobson: "Yesterday Boulevard" b/w "On A Still Night", 3/1976
- WIP 6289 – War: "Why Can't We Be Friends?" b/w "In Mazatlan", 3/1976
- WIP 6290 – Leon Russell: "Tight Rope" b/w "This Masquerade", 1/1977
- WIP 6291 – Trevor White: "Crazy Kids" b/w "Movin' In The Right Direction", 6/1976
- WIP 6292 – The Dodgers: "Don't Let Me Be Wrong" b/w "Get To You", 4/1976
- WIP 6293 – Rock Follies: "Glenn Miller Is Missing" b/w "Talking Pictures", 3/1977
- WIP 6294 – Burning Spear: "Black Wa-Da-Da (Invasion) (Dub version)" b/w "I And I Survive (Slavery Days)" (Dub version), 12/3/1976 (Double A-side)
- WIP 6295 – Righteous Foundation: "Going Back To Ethiopia Zion" b/w "Zion", 1976
- WIP 6296 – Bob Marley & The Wailers: "Johnny Was (Woman Hold Her Head And Cry)" b/w "Cry To Me", 4/1976
- WIP 6297 – Not released
- WIP 6298 – Not released
- WIP 6299 – Jim Capaldi: "Talkin' About My Baby" b/w "Still Talkin'", 4/1976
- WIP 6300 – Peter Skellern: "Oh What A Night For Love" b/w "Down In The Cellar", 1976
- WIP 6301 – Automatic Man: "My Pearl" b/w "Wallflower", 21/5/1976 (picture sleeve) (An edited version for radio play was also released.)
- WIP 6302 – Not released
- WIP 6303 – War: "Me and Baby Brother" b/w "In Your Eyes", 6/1976
- WIP 6304 – Murray Head: "Someone's Rocking My Dreamboat" b/w "She's Such A Drag", 5/1976 (picture sleeve)
- WIP 6305 – Max Romeo & The Upsetters: "One Step Forward" b/w "One Step Dub", 5/1976
- WIP 6306 – Eddie and the Hot Rods: "Wooly Bully" b/w "Horseplay (Weary Of The Schmalz)", 6/1976 (picture sleeve)
- WIP 6307 – Bryan Ferry: "Let's Stick Together (Let's Work Together)" b/w "Sea Breezes", 28/5/1976
- WIP 6308 – Roxy Music: "Do The Strand" b/w "War Brides" (not released)
- WIP 6309 – Bob Marley & The Wailers: "Roots Rock Reggae" b/w "Them Belly Full (But We Hungry)", 6/1976
- WIP 6310 – Rock Follies: "Sugar Mountain" b/w "War Brides", 6/1976
- WIP 6311 – Georgie Fame: "Sweet Perfection" b/w "Thanking Heaven", 6/1976
- WIP 6312 – Aswad: "Back To Africa" b/w "Africa", 6/1976
- WIP 6313 – Burning Spear: "Man In The Hill", 1976
- WIP 6314 – Speedy Keen: "Your Love" b/w "Heaven", 1976
- WIP 6315 – War: "Summer" b/w "All Day Music", 8/1976
- WIP 6316 – Junior Murvin: "Police and Thieves" b/w "Grumblin Dub", 12/11/1976 (originally intended for release on 9/7/1976)
- WIP 6317 – Toots & the Maytals: "Funky Kingston", 1977
- WIP 6318 – The Spencer Davis Group: "Gimme Some Loving" b/w "Gimme Some Loving '76", 8/1976 ("Then!.. ...Now!" picture sleeve)
- WIP 6319 – Heads Hands and Feet: "Warming Up The Band" b/w "Silver Mine", 1976 ("Then!.. ...Now!" picture sleeve)
- WIP 6320 – Bryan Ferry: "The Price Of Love" b/w "Shame Shame Shame", 1976 (Jukebox special issue of two songs from the "Price of Love" EP, IEP 1)
- WIP 6321 – Dwight Twilley Band: "I'm On Fire" b/w "Did You See What Happened", 1976 (Shelter label)
- WIP 6322 – Not released
- WIP 6323 – Peter Tosh: "Legalise It" (not released)
- WIP 6324 – Gavin Christopher: "Dance With Me" (not released)
- WIP 6325 – Heptones with The Upsetters: "Sufferer's Time" b/w "Sufferer's Dub", 1976
- WIP 6326 – Lee Perry: "Roast Fish & Corn Bread" b/w Upsetters: "Corn Fish Dub", 8/1976
- WIP 6327 – Justin Hinds & the Dominoes: "Fire" b/w "Natty Take Over", 8/1976
- WIP 6328 – Scratch & The Upsetters: "Three In One" b/w "Curly Dub", 8/1976 (Scratch was Lee "Scratch" Perry)
- WIP 6329 – Not released
- WIP 6330 – Max Romeo: "Chase The Devil" b/w The Upsetters featuring Prince Jazzbo: "Croaking Lizard", 1976
- WIP 6331 – Derek and Clive: "Squatter and the Ant" b/w "Sex Crime", 1976
- WIP 6332 – Aaron Neville: "Tell It Like It Is" b/w "Been So Wrong", 1976
- WIP 6333 – Eddie and the Hot Rods: "96 Tears" b/w "Get Out Of Denver", 9/1976 (Jukebox special issue of two songs from the "Live at the Marquee" EP, IEP 2)
- WIP 6334 – Dillinger: "Cokane In My Brain" b/w "Power Bank", 1976
- WIP 6335 – Julien Covey & the Machine: "A Little Bit Hurt" (not released)
- WIP 6336 – Pete Wingfield: "Bubbling Under" b/w "I Wanna Try", 1976 (edited version of A-side)
- WIP 6337 – Sparks: "Big Boy" b/w "Fill 'Er Up", 10/1976
- WIP 6338 – Aswad: "Three Babylon" b/w "Ire Woman", 1976
- WIP 6339 – J. J. Cale: "Hey Baby" b/w "Magnolia", 10/1976 (Shelter label)
- WIP 6340 – War: "The Cisco Kid" b/w "Beetles In The Bog", 9/1976
- WIP 6341 – Dwight Twilley Band: "Could Be Love" b/w "Feeling In The Dark", 1976 (Shelter label)
- WIP 6342 – The Dodgers: "Just Wanna Love You" b/w "Don't Know What You're Doing", 10/1976 (number originally allotted to The Heptones with The Upsetters: "Party Time", but not issued)
- WIP 6343 – Not released
- WIP 6344 – Lord Creator: "Big Pussy Sally" b/w The Upsetters: "Big Pussy Dub", 1976
- WIP 6345 – Robert Palmer: "Man Smart, Woman Smarter" b/w "From A Whisper To A Scream", 10/1976
- WIP 6346 – Burning Spear: "Lion" b/w "Door Peep", 10/1976
- WIP 6347 – Bunny Wailer: "Dream Land" b/w "Dream Land Dub", 10/1976
- WIP 6348 – Not released
- WIP 6349 – Not released
- WIP 6350 – Ultravox!: Proposed title unknown (not released)
- WIP 6351 – Free: "The Hunter" b/w "Worry", 11/1976
- WIP 6352 – Fay Bennett: "Big Cockey Wally" b/w The Upsetters: "Big Cockey Dub", 1976
- WIP 6353 – Leroy Smart: "Ballistic Affair" b/w "Ballistic Dub", 1976
- WIP 6354 – Eddie and the Hot Rods: "Teenage Depression" b/w "Shake", 11/1976 (picture sleeve)
- WIP 6355 – Dillinger: "Bionic Dread" b/w "Eastman Skank", 1976 (Black Swan label)
- WIP 6356 – Jah Lion: "Soldier & Police War" b/w Glen DaCosta: "Magic Touch", 1976
- WIP 6357 – Sparks: "I Like Girls" b/w "England", 11/1976
- WIP 6358 – The Jess Roden Band: "Stay In Bed" b/w "Me And Crystal Eye", 11/1976
- WIP 6359 – War: "Slippin' into Darkness" b/w "Nappy Head", 12/1976
- WIP 6360 – The Goodies: "Elizabeth Rules UK" b/w "Blowing Off", 10/12/1976
- WIP 6361 – The Dodgers: "Down" b/w "Don't Know What You're Doing", 12/1976
- WIP 6362 – Rico/I Jah Man: "Gan-jah" (not released)
- WIP 6364 – The Heptones: "Party Time" b/w "Deceivers", 1976
- WIP 6365 – Leon Russell: "Slipping Into Christmas" b/w "Christmas In Chicago", 31/12/1976 (Shelter label)
- WIP 6366 – J. J. Cale: "Travelin' Light" b/w "Cocaine", 1/1977 (Shelter label)
- WIP 6367 – Not released
- WIP 6368 – Not released
- WIP 6369 – Not released
- WIP 6370 – Lee Perry & The Upsetters: "Dreadlocks In Moonlight" b/w "Cut Throat", 11/1976
- WIP 6371 – Ras Midass: "Kude A Bamba" b/w "Congo Dub", 1976 (Black Swan label)
- WIP 6372 – Not released
- WIP 6373 – Michael Nesmith: "Rio" b/w "Life, The Unsuspecting Captive", 3/1977
- WIP 6374 – Eddie and the Hot Rods: "All I Need Is Money" (not released)
- WIP 6375 – Ultravox!: "Dangerous Rhythm" b/w "My Sex", 28/1/1977 (later pressings in picture sleeve)
- WIP 6376 – Bob Marley & the Wailers: "Smile Jamaica" (not released)
- WIP 6377 – Tom Petty and the Heartbreakers: "American Girl" b/w "The Wild One, Forever", 2/1977 (Shelter label)
- WIP 6378 – Not released
- WIP 6379 – Not released
- WIP 6380 – Dillinger: "Natty B.Sc." b/w "Buckingham Palace", 1977 (Black Swan label)
- WIP 6381 – Bad Company: "Everything I Need" b/w "Too Bad", 18/2/1977 (picture sleeve)
- WIP 6382 – Keble Drummond & The Cables: "What Kind Of World" b/w "World Of Dub", 1977 (Black Swan label)
- WIP 6383 – Jim Capaldi: "Goodbye My Love" b/w "Baby You're Not My Problem", 3/1977
- WIP 6384 – Georgie Fame: "Daylight" b/w "Three Legged Mule", 1977 (B-side credited to Georgie Fame & the Blue Flames)
- WIP 6385 – John Martyn: "Over The Hill" b/w "Head And Heart", 2/1977
- WIP 6386 – Wilton Place Street Band: "Disco Lucy (I Love Lucy Theme)" b/w "You Don't Even Know Who We Are", 1976
- WIP 6387 – Cat Stevens: "(Remember The Days Of The) Old School Yard" b/w "The Doves", 3/6/1977 (picture sleeve)
- WIP 6388 – Eddie and the Hot Rods: "I Might Be Lying" b/w "Ignore Them (Always Crashing In The Same Bar)", 15/4/1977 (picture sleeve)
- WIP 6389 – Not released
- WIP 6390 – Bob Marley & The Wailers: "Exodus" b/w "Exodus (Dub)", 6/1977
- WIP 6391 – Sandy Denny: "Candle in the Wind" b/w "Still Waters Run Deep", 5/1977
- WIP 6392 – Ultravox!: "Young Savage" b/w "Slipaway", 5/1977 (picture sleeve)
- WIP 6393 – J.J. Cale: "After Midnight" b/w "Bringing It Back", 5/1977 (Shelter label)
- WIP 6394 – Steve Winwood: "Time Is Running Out" b/w "Penultimate Zone", 6/1977
- WIP 6395 – Jim Capaldi: "Daughter Of The Night" (not released)
- WIP 6396 – Tom Petty and the Heartbreakers: "Anything That's Rock 'n' Roll" b/w "Fooled Again (I Don't Like It)", 6/1977 (Shelter label)
- WIP 6397 – Jimmy Cliff: "You Can Get It If You Really Want" b/w "Many Rivers To Cross", 5/1977
- WIP 6398 – Michael Nesmith: "Navajo Trail" b/w "Love's First Kiss", 7/1977
- WIP 6399 – Rico: "Africa" b/w "Afro Dub", 1977 (Black Swan label)
- WIP 6400 – Not released
- WIP 6401 – Rods: "Do Anything You Wanna Do" b/w "Schoolgirl Love", 29/7/1977 (picture sleeve)
- WIP 6402 – Bob Marley & The Wailers: "Waiting In Vain" b/w "Roots", 7/1977
- WIP 6403 – Tom Petty and the Heartbreakers: "American Girl" b/w "Luna", 7/1977 (Shelter label, picture sleeve)
- WIP 6404 – Ultravox!: "Rockwrok" b/w "Hiroshima Mon Amour", 10/1977 (picture sleeve)
- WIP 6405 – Keith Rowe: "Groovy Situation" b/w "Groovy Dub", 1977 (Black Swan label)
- WIP 6406 – Jess Roden: "Misty Roses" b/w "In Me Tonight", 1977
- WIP 6407 – Cat Stevens: "Sweet Jamaica" (not released)
- WIP 6408 – The Dwight Twilley Band: "Trying To Find My Baby" b/w "Rock And Roll", 1977 (Shelter label)
- WIP 6409 – Matthew Moore: "Savannah" b/w "Moondew", 1977 (Shelter label)
- WIP 6410 – Bob Marley & the Wailers: "Jamming" b/w "Punky Reggae Party", 12/1977 (picture sleeve)
- WIP 6411 – Eddie and the Hot Rods: "Quit This Town" b/w "Distortion May Be Expected", 12/1977 (picture sleeve)
- WIP 6413 – Third World: "96º in the Shade" b/w "Human Market Place", 1977 (number originally allotted to Georgie Fame: "To Be A Lover" – not released)
- WIP 6414 – John Martyn: "Dancing" b/w "Dealer (version)", 1/1978
- WIP 6415 – Grace Jones: "La Vie En Rose" b/w "I Need A Man", 12/1977
- WIP 6416 – Dillinger: "Cokane In My Brain" b/w "Buckingham Palace" & "Ragnampiza", 1977 (Black Swan label)
- WIP 6417 – Ultravox: "Quirks" b/w "Modern Love (live)", 1977
- WIP 6418 – Robin Tyner & the Hot Rods: "Till The Night Is Gone (Let's Rock)" b/w "Flipside Rock", 12/1977
- WIP 6419 – Jess Roden: "The Hardest Blow" b/w "Woman Across The Water", 1977
- WIP 6420 – Bob Marley & The Wailers: "Is This Love" b/w "Crisis (version)", 2/1978 (picture sleeve)
- WIP 6421 – Not released
- WIP 6422 – Hi-Tension: "Hi-Tension" b/w "Girl I Betcha", 5/1978
- WIP 6423 – Ian Gillan Band: "Mad Elaine" b/w "Mercury High", 1/1978
- WIP 6424 – George Faith: "I've Got The Groove" b/w "Opportunity", 1978
- WIP 6425 – Robert Palmer: "Every Kinda People" b/w "Keep In Touch", 3/1978
- WIP 6426 – Tom Petty & the Heartbreakers: "I Need To Know" b/w "No Second Thoughts", 6/1978 (Shelter label)
- WIP 6427 – The Dwight Twilley Band: "Twilley Don't Mind" b/w "Looking For The Magic", 1978 (Shelter label)
- WIP 6428 – Steel Pulse: "Ku Klux Klan" b/w "Dub", 1978 (picture sleeve)
- WIP 6429 – Not released
- WIP 6430 – Illusion: "Madonna Blue" b/w "Everywhere You Go", 1977 (picture sleeve)
- WIP 6431 – Jimmy Lindsay: "Easy" b/w "Easy (Dub)", 1977 (12": 12WIP 6431 also includes "Prophecy" by Fabian)
- WIP 6432 – Not released
- WIP 6433 – Automatics: "Walking With The Radio On" b/w "Watch Her Now" (not released)
- WIP 6434 – J.J. Cale: "I'm A Gypsy Man" b/w "Cherry", 2/1978 (Shelter label)
- WIP 6435 – Not released
- WIP 6436 – Lorna Bennett: "Breakfast In Bed" b/w "Skank In Bed", 10/3/1978 (reissue)
- WIP 6437 – The Reaction: "I Can't Resist" b/w "I Am A Case", 6/1978 (picture sleeve)
- WIP 6438 – Eddie & the Hot Rods: "Life On The Line" b/w "Do Anything You Wanna Do (live)", 3/1978 (picture sleeve)
- WIP 6439 – Automatics: "When The Tanks Roll Over Poland Again" b/w "Watch Her Now", 1978 (picture sleeve)
- WIP 6440 – Bob Marley & the Wailers: "Satisfy My Soul" b/w "Smile Jamaica", 5/1978 (picture sleeve)
- WIP 6441 – Sheila Hylton: "Don't Ask My Neighbour" b/w "Jam Down Rocker", 1978 (picture sleeve)
- WIP 6442 – Julien Covey & the Machine: "A Little Bit Hurt" b/w "Sweet Bacon", 1978 (reissue)
- WIP 6443 – Not released
- WIP 6444 – Not released
- WIP 6445 – Robert Palmer: "Best of Both Worlds" b/w "Where Can It Go?", 21/7/1978 (picture sleeve)
- WIP 6445 – Robert Palmer: "Best of Both Worlds" b/w "Best of Both Worlds (Dub)", 9/1978 (promo version of previous entry)
- WIP 6446 – Hi Tension: "British Hustle" b/w "Peace On Earth", 8/1978
- WIP 6447 – Jimmy Cliff: "Many Rivers To Cross" b/w The Melodians: "Rivers Of Babylon", 6/1978 (picture sleeve)
- WIP 6448 – Arthur Louis: "Knockin' On Heaven's Door" b/w "The Dealer", 1978
- WIP 6449 – Steel Pulse: "Prodigal Son" b/w "Prodigal Son (Dub)", 6/1978 (picture sleeve)
- WIP 6450 – Grace Jones: "Do or Die" b/w "Comme Un Oiseau Qui S'Envoie", 7/1978 (picture sleeve)
- WIP 6451 – Zap-Pow: "Let's Fall In Love" b/w "Some Sweet Day", 1978
- WIP 6452 – Not released
- WIP 6453 – Not released
- WIP 6454 – Ultravox: "Slow Motion" b/w "Dislocation", 8/1978 (picture sleeve)
- WIP 6455 – Tom Petty & the Heartbreakers: "Listen To Her Heart" b/w "I Don't Know What To Say To You", 9/1978 (Shelter label)
- WIP 6456 – Sugar: "Manhattan Fever" b/w "Manhattan", 1978
- WIP 6457 – Third World: "Now That We've Found Love" b/w "Night Heat", 9/1978 (picture sleeve)
- WIP 6458 – I Jah Man: "Jah Heavy Load (Edited version)" b/w "I'm A Levi (Edited version)", 1978
- WIP 6459 – Ultravox: "Quiet Men" b/w "Cross Fade", 10/1978 (picture sleeve)
- WIP 6460 – Reaction: "Telling You" b/w "Telling You Part 2", 1978
- WIP 6461 – Steel Pulse: "Prediction" b/w "Handsworth Revolution (dub)", 8/1978
- WIP 6462 – Hi Tension: "Autumn Love" b/w "Unspoken", 1978
- WIP 6463 – Not released
- WIP 6464 – Eddie + Hot Rods: "Media Messiahs" b/w "Horror Through Straightness", 1/1979 (picture sleeve)
- WIP 6465 – Cat Stevens: "Last Love Song" b/w "Nascimento", 2/1979
- WIP 6466 – Cristina: "Disco Clone" b/w "Disco 'O'", 11/1978 (ZE label)
- WIP 6467 – The Reasons: "Hard Day At The Office" b/w "Bright Baby Eyes", 1978
- WIP 6468 – Not released
- WIP 6469 – Third World: "Cool Meditation" b/w "Cool Meditation (Part II)", 12/1978
- 12WIP 6469 – Third World: "Cool Meditation" b/w "Journey To Addis" (12" single)
- WIP 6470 – Toots & the Maytals: "Take It From Me" b/w "Premature", 1978
- WIP 6471 – Not released
- WIP 6472 – Inner Circle: "Everything Is Great" b/w "Wanted Dead Or Alive", 2/1979
- WIP 6473 – Not released
- WIP 6474 – Eddie + Hot Rods: "Power And The Glory" b/w "Highlands One Hopefuls Two", 3/1979 (picture sleeve)
- WIP 6475 – Not released
- WIP 6476 – Charlie Dore: "Fear Of Flying" b/w "Sweetheart", 1979 (picture sleeve)
- WIP 6477 – Toots & the Maytals: "Famine" b/w "Pass The Pipe", 1978
- WIP 6478 – Bob Marley & The Wailers: "Stir It Up" b/w "Rat Race", 1979 (withdrawn and replaced by following entry)
- 12WIP 6478 Bob Marley & The Wailers: "Stir It Up (live)" b/w "War" and "No More Trouble" (both live), 1979 (12" single)
- WIP 6479 – J.J. Cale: "Katy, Kool Lady" b/w Juan and Maria: "Juarez Blues", 6/1979 (Shelter label)
- WIP 6480 – The Dwight Twilley Band: "Out Of My Hands" b/w "Nothing's Ever Gonna Change So Fast", 23/2/1979 (Shelter label, picture sleeve)
- WIP 6481 – Robert Palmer: "Bad Case Of Lovin' You (Doctor, Doctor)" b/w "Love Can Run Faster", 5/1979
- WIP 6482 – Not released
- WIP 6483 – Gibson Brothers: "Cuba" b/w "Club version", 3/1979
- WIP 6484 – Phoebe Snow: "Poetry Man" b/w "San Francisco Bay Blues" (Shelter label)
- WIP 6485 – Third World: "One Cold Vibe" b/w "Feel A Little Better" (picture sleeve)
- WIP 6486 – Not released
- WIP 6487 – Not released
- WIP 6488 – Inner Circle: "Stop Breaking My Heart" b/w "Sinners", 5/1979
- 12XWIP 6489 – Hi Tension: "Funktified (long version)" b/w "Latin Inspiration", 1979 (12" single)
- WIP 6490 – Steel Pulse: "Sound System" b/w "Crampas Style", 5/1979
- WIP 6491 – Marianne Faithfull: "The Ballad Of Lucy Jordan" b/w "Brain Drain", 10/1979
- WIP 6492 – Not released
- WIP 6493 – Hi Tension: "There's A Reason" b/w "If It Moves You", 1979
- WIP 6494 – Linton Kwesi Johnson: "Want Fi Goh Rave" b/w "Reality Poem", 5/1979
- WIP 6495 – John Martyn: "Johnny Too Bad" b/w "Johnny Too Bad (instrumental)", 10/1980
- WIP 6496 – Third World: "Talk To Me" b/w "Talk To Me (Part 2)", 6/1979 (picture sleeve)
- WIP 6497 – Not released
- WIP 6498 – Inner Circle: "We 'A' Rockers" b/w "We 'A' Rockers (Part 2)", 1979
- WIP 6499 – American Standard Band: "Got What It Takes" b/w "Children's Island", 1979 (picture sleeve)
- 12XWIP 6500 – Tumblack: "Caraiba" b/w "Invocation", 1979 (picture sleeve)
- WIP 6501 – The Jags: "Back Of My Hand" b/w "Double Vision", 6/1979 (picture sleeve)
- 12XWIP 6502 – Dwight Twilley Band: "Dwight On White" (6-track EP: "I'm On Fire"/"T.V."/"Runaway" b/w "Looking For The Magic"/"Standin' In The Shadow Of Love"/"Sleeping"), 1979 (Shelter label, 12" on white vinyl, picture sleeve)
- WIP 6503 – Gibson Brothers: "Ooh! What A Life" b/w "You", 7/1979
- WIP 6504 – U.S. of A.: "2–1 (I Bet Ya)" b/w "2–1 (I Bet Ya) Instrumental Version", 1979
- WIP 6505 – The Slits: "Typical Girls" b/w "I Heard It Through The Grapevine", 9/1979
- WIP 6506 – The B-52's: "Rock Lobster" b/w "Running Around", 7/1979
- WIP 6507 – The In Crowd: "Reggae Groove", 1979
- WIP 6508 – Not released
- WIP 6509 – Not released
- WIP 6510 – Bob Marley & The Wailers: "So Much Trouble In The World" b/w "(instrumental)" 11/1979
- WIP 6511 – Not released
- WIP 6512 – Not released
- WIP 6513 – Not released
- WIP 6514 – Roland Al & The Soul Brothers: "Phoenix City" b/w "El Pussy Cat", 1979
- WIP 6515 – Robert Palmer: "Jealous" b/w "Woman You're Wonderful", 8/1979
- WIP 6516 – Randy VanWarmer: "Just When I Needed You Most" b/w "Your Light", 7/1979 (Bearsville label)
- WIP 6517 – Lone Ranger: "Barnabas Collins" b/w "Part 2 Dub", 1979
- WIP 6518 – Serge Gainsbourg: "Aux Armes Et Caetara" b/w "Daisy Temple", 1979
- WIP 6519 – Third World: "Tonight For Me" b/w "Irie Ites", 1979 (picture sleeve)
- WIP 6520 – Dan-I: "Monkey Chop" b/w "Roller (Do It) Boogie", 1979
- WIP 6521 – J.J. Cale: "Katy, Kool Lady" b/w "Juarez Blues", 8/1979 (Shelter label, picture sleeve) (Reissue of WIP 6479?)
- WIP 6522 – Wailing Souls: "Something Funny" b/w Prince Jammy: "Dub Funny Something", 1979
- WIP 6523 – Total Eclipse: "You Got The Cooties" b/w "(Song from the book of) Astrology", 9/1979 (Shelter label)
- WIP 6524 – The Buggles: "Video Killed the Radio Star" b/w "Kid Dynamo", 9/1979
- WIP 6525 – Gibson Brothers: "Que Sera Mi Vida (If You Should Go)" b/w "Heaven", 11/1979
- WIP 6526 – Charlie Dore: "Pilot Of The Airwaves" b/w "Falling", 1979
- WIP 6527 – The B-52's: "6060-842" b/w "Hero Worship", 9/1979
- WIP 6528 – Linton Kwesi Johnson: "Sonny's Lettah (Anti-Sus Poem)" b/w "Iron Bar Dub/Tek Chance/Funny Dub", 9/1979
- WIP 6529 – Vivian Weathers: "Just A Game" b/w "Cheat Heart Dub", 1979
- WIP 6530 – 4"Be2": "One Of The Lads" b/w "Ummbaba", 1979 (picture sleeve)
- WIP 6531 – The Jags: "Woman's World" b/w "Dumb Blonde", 1/1980 (picture sleeve)
- WIP 6532 – Sparks: "This Town Ain't Big Enough For The Both Of Us" b/w "Looks, Looks, Looks", 9/1979 (reissue)
- WIP 6533 – The Distractions: "It Doesn't Bother Me" b/w "One Way Love", 18/1/1980 (picture sleeve)
- 12WIP 6534 – Third World: "Story's Been Told" b/w "Always Around", 11/1979 (unreleased on 7", although promotional copies may exist with cat. no. WIP 6534)
- WIP 6535 – Not released
- WIP 6536 – Randy VanWarmer: "Call Me" b/w "Forever Loving You", 1979 (Bearsville label)
- WIP 6537 – Inner Circle: "New Age Music" b/w Music Machine", 7/1980
- WIP 6538 – James Vane: "Judy's Gone Down" b/w "Jung Lovers", 9/1979 (picture sleeve))
- WIP 6539 – Junior Murvin: "Police and Thieves" b/w Jah Lion: "Soldier And Police War", (12": 12WIP 6539)
- WIP 6540 – The Buggles: "Living in the Plastic Age" b/w "Island", 1/1980
- WIP 6541 – Not released
- WIP 6542 – Marianne Faithfull: "Broken English" b/w "What's The Hurry", 1/1980
- WIP 6543 – Suicide: "Dream Baby Dream" b/w "Radiation", 11/1979; (12": 12WIP 6543) (ZE label)
- WIP 6544 – Toots & the Maytals: "Chatty, Chatty" b/w "Turn It Up", 1980
- WIP 6545 – Brian Briggs: "Nervous Breakdown" b/w "Lifer", 11/1980 (Bearsville label)
- WIP 6546 – Not released
- WIP 6547 – John Martyn: "Johnny Too Bad" b/w "Johnny Too Bad (Version)", 10/1980
- WIP 6548 – Not released
- WIP 6549 – Robert Palmer: "Can We Still Be Friends" b/w "Back In My Arms", 11/1979
- WIP 6550 – Killing Joke: "Nervous System" b/w "Turn To Red", 11/1979 (Malicious Damage label)
- 12WIP 6550 – Killing Joke: "Nervous System" b/w "Almost Red" (12" single – see WIP 6550 for 7" version)
- WIP 6551 – The B-52's: "Planet Claire" b/w "There's a Moon in the Sky (Called The Moon)", 11/1979 (picture sleeve) (also released as a picture disc with catalogue no. PWIP 6551)
- WIP 6552 – Not released
- WIP 6553 – Bob Marley and the Wailers: "Survival" b/w "Wake Up And Live", 11/1979
- WIP 6554 – Linton Kwesi Johnson: "Di Black Petty Booshwah" b/w "Straight to Madray's Head", 1980
- WIP 6555 – Kim Fowley: "1989: Waiting Around For The Next Ten Years" b/w "1987: Lost Like A Lizard In The Show", 1/1980
- WIP 6556 – Not released
- WIP 6557 – Don Armando's Second Avenue Rhumba Band: "I'm An Indian Too" b/w "Deputy Of Love", 1/1980; (ZE/Island label; 12": 12WIP 6557; reissied 9/1982 with picture sleeve)
- WIP 6558 – The Rivits: "Look All You Like" b/w "Multiplay", 8/1980
- WIP 6559 – Norma Jean: "High Society" b/w "Hold Me Lonely Boy", 3/1980 (Bearsville label)
- WIP 6560 – Cristina: "Is That All There Is?" b/w "Jungle Love", 1/1980 (ZE/Island label; picture sleeve; 12": 12WIP 6560)
- WIP 6561 – Gibson Brothers: "Cuba" b/w "Better Do It Salsa", 2/1980
- WIP 6562 – Steel Pulse: "Don't Give In" b/w "Don't Give In (Instrumental)", 3/1980
- WIP 6563 – Carlos Malcolm & the Afro-Caribs: "Bonanza Ska" b/w Desmond Dekker: "Get Up Edina" / Skatalites: "Beardman Ska", 1980
- WIP 6564 – Davitt Sigerson: "I Never Fall In Love" b/w "Cry For Love", 7/1980 (ZE/Island label)
- WIP 6565 – Not released
- WIP 6566 – Not released
- WIP 6567 – Not released
- WIP 6568 – The Distractions: "Boys Cry (Where No One Can See Them)" b/w "Paracetamol Paralysis", 1980 (picture sleeve)
- WIP 6569 – Cristina: "Is That All There Is?" b/w "Jungle Love", 1980
- WIP 6570 – Not released
- WIP 6571 – Invisible Man's Band: "All Night Thing" b/w Instrumental, 6/1980
- WIP 6572 – Dan-I: "Hidden Valley" b/w "Action", 1980
- WIP 6573 – Not released
- WIP 6574 – Millie: "My Boy Lollypop" b/w "Oh, Henry" (picture sleeve; also 12": 12WIP 6574)
- 12WIP 6575 – Aswad: "Rainbow Culture" b/w "Covenant (Dub)", 1980
- WIP 6576 – Charlie Dore: "Where To Now" b/w "Fear Of Flying", 1979?
- WIP 6577 – Junior Tucker: "One Of The Poorest People" b/w "Strong Love", 1980
- WIP 6578 – Not released
- WIP 6579 – The B-52's: "Give Me Back My Man" b/w "Strobe Light", 7/1980
- WIP 6580 – Justin Hinds & the Dominoes: "Rub Up, Push Up" b/w The Rulers: "Copasetic", 1980
- WIP 6581 – Utopia: "Set Me Free" b/w "Umbrella", 3/1980 (Bearsville label)
- WIP 6582 – Foghat: "Third Time Lucky" b/w "Somebody's Been Sleepin' In My Bed", 3/1980 (Bearsville label, originally scheduled for release in 1979)
- WIP 6583 – Not released
- WIP 6584 – The Buggles: "Clean Clean" b/w "Technopop", 3/1980
- WIP 6585 – Not released
- WIP 6586 – Bernie Tormé: "The Beat", 1980 (3-track EP, p/s on pink vinyl)
- WIP 6587 – The Jags: "Party Games" b/w "She's So Considerate", 1980
- WIP 6588 – Not released
- WIP 6589 – Steel Pulse: "Caught You Dancing" b/w "Caught (dub version)", 5/1980
- WIP 6590 – Not released
- WIP 6591 – Grace Jones: "A Rolling Stone" b/w "Sinning", 1980
- WIP 6592 – Desmond Dekker: "007 (Shanty Town)" b/w Hopeton Lewis: "Cool Collie" / Derrick Morgan: "Judge Dread In Court", (re-issue of 1960s singles)
- WIP 6593 – Toots & the Maytals: "Just Like That" b/w "Gone With The Wind", 1980
- WIP 6594 – Cat Stevens: "Morning Has Broken" b/w "Moonshadow", 1980
- WIP 6595 – King Sounds & Israelites: "Patches" b/w "Happiness", 1980
- WIP 6596 – The Ethiopians: "Train To Skaville" b/w Roy Shirley: "Hold Them" and King Perry: "Doctor Dick", 1980
- WIP 6597 – Bob Marley & The Wailers: "Zimbabwe" b/w "Survival", 3/1980 (picture sleeve)
- 12WIP 6598 – Various Artists: "The Secret Policeman's Ball – The Music", 1980
- 10WIP 6599 – Bob & Earl: "Harlem Shuffle", Owen Gray: "You Don't Know Like I Know", Robert Parker: "Let's Go Baby" b/w Donnie Elbert: "A Little Piece Of Leather", Billy Preston: "Billy's Bag", Righteous Brothers: "Justine", 1980 (Sue label, overall title: "Plundering The Archives Consignment No. 1")
- WIP 6601 – U2 "11 O'Clock Tick Tock" b/w "Touch", 1980
- WIP 6602 – Not released
- WIP 6603 – Bo and the Generals: "Rich Girl" b/w "I Know", 1980
- WIP 6604 – Steve Winwood: "While You See a Chance" b/w "Vacant Chair", 1980 (South African issue)
- WIP 6605 – Grace Jones: "Love Is the Drug" b/w "Sinning", 1980 (Swedish issue)
- WIP 6606 – Robert Palmer: "Johnny and Mary" b/w "What's It Take", 1981 (South African issue)
- WIP 6607 – Not released
- WIP 6608 – Not released
- WIP 6609 – Vane: "Glamorous Boys" b/w "Trails of Error", 1980
- WIP 6610 – Bob Marley & The Wailers: "Could You Be Loved" b/w "One Drop", 5/1980; Could You Be Loved (12": 12WIP 6610)
- WIP 6611 – Randy Vanwarmer: "Whatever You Decide" b/w "Losing Out On Love", 7/1980 (Bearsville label)
- WIP 6612 – Junior Tucker: "Some Guys Have All the Luck" b/w "Spinning Around", 9/1980
- WIP 6613 – Bob Marley and the Wailers: "Is This Love" b/w "No Woman, No Cry", 1981 (South African issue)
- WIP 6614 – Basement 5: "Silicon Chip" b/w "Chip Butty", 5/1980 (picture sleeve)
- WIP 6615 – Robert Parker: "Barefootin'" b/w Julian Covey: "A Little Bit Hurt" and The Anglos: "Incense"
- 10WIP 6615 – Robert Parker: "Barefootin'", Julian Covey: "A Little Bit Hurt", Soul Sisters: "I Can't Stand It" b/w The Anglos: "Incense", The Righteous Brothers: "Little Latin Lupe Lu", Inez and Charlie Foxx: "Hurt By Love", 1980 (Sue label, Plundering the Archives Consignment No. 2
- WIP 6617 – Gibson Brothers: "Mariana" b/w "All I Want Is You", 7/1980
- WIP 6618 – Not released
- WIP 6619 – Kid Creole & The Coconuts: "Maladie d'Amour", 1980
- WIP 6620 – Marianne Faithfull: "Sweetheart" b/w "Over Here", 1980 (South African issue)
- WIP 6621 – Not released
- WIP 6622 – Robert Palmer: "Some Guys Have All the Luck" b/w "Too Good to Be True", 1980 (South African issue)
- WIP 6623 – Not released
- WIP 6624 – The Buggles: "Elstree" b/w "Johnny on the Monorail", 11/1980
- WIP 6625 – Not released
- 12WIP 6626 – Black Uhuru: "Sinsemilla" b/w "Guess Who's Coming to Dinner", 7/1980
- WIP 6627 – Not released
- WIP 6628 – Not released
- WIP 6629 – Grace Jones: "Private Life" b/w "She's Lost Control", 6/1980 (picture sleeve)
- WIP 6630 – U2: "A Day Without Me" b/w "Things To Make And Do", 8/1980
- WIP 6631 – The Strand: "Can't Look Back" b/w "Prisoners in Paradise", 1980
- WIP 6632 – Joe Cocker and Jennifer Warnes: "Up Where We Belong" b/w Joe Cocker: "Sweet Little Woman", 1982 (South African issue)
- WIP 6633 – Peech Boys: "Life Is Something Special" (vocal and instrumental), 1983 (South African issue)
- WIP 6634 – Not released
- WIP 6635 – Not released
- WIP 6636 – Papa Michigan and General Smiley: "One Love Jam Down" b/w "Dub Down", 1980
- WIP 6637 – Not released
- WIP 6638 – Robert Palmer: "Johnny and Mary" b/w "What's It Take", 8/1980 (picture sleeve)
- WIP 6639 – Not released
- WIP 6640 – Gibson Brothers: "Metropolis" b/w "Because I Love You", 1980
- WIP 6641 – Bob Marley & the Wailers: "Three Little Birds" b/w "Every Need Got An Ego To Feed", 8/1980 (Tuff Gong)
- WIP 6642 – Invisible Man's Band: "9 X's Out Of Ten" b/w "Love Can't Come Love Has Come", 1980
- WIP 6643 – Davitt Sigerson: "Twist" b/w "Mood Piece", 1980 (ZE label)
- WIP 6644 – Galaxy: "Dancing Tight", 1983 (South African issue)
- WIP 6645 – Grace Jones: "The Hunter Gets Captured by the Game (LP version)" b/w "The Hunter Gets Captured by the Game (Part 2)", 9/1980
- WIP 6646 – Aswad featuring Tromie and Bami: "Warrior Charge" b/w "Dub Charge", 1980 (Grove Music)
- WIP 6647 – Not released
- WIP 6648 – Not released
- WIP 6649 – Not released
- WIP 6650 – The Distractions: "Something for the Weekend" b/w "What's the Use?", 1980
- WIP 6651 – Robert Palmer: "Looking for Clues" b/w "In Walks Love Again", 11/1980 (picture sleeve)
  - 12WIP 6651 – Robert Palmer: "Looking for Clues" b/w "Good Care of You" and "Style Kills", 11/1980
- WIP 6653 – Bob Marley & The Wailers: "Redemption Song" b/w "Redemption Song" (band version), 10/1980
- WIP 6654 – Basement 5: "Last White Christmas" b/w "Traffic Dub", 12/1980
- WIP 6655 – Steve Winwood: "While You See A Chance" b/w "Vacant Chair", 12/1980
- WIP 6656 – U2: "I Will Follow" b/w "Boy-Girl (live)", 10/1980 (picture sleeve)
- WIP 6657 – Not released
- WIP 6658 – Not released
- WIP 6659 – Gibson Brothers: "Latin America" b/w "Latin America (instrumental version)", 1980
- WIP 6660 – Frankie Goes to Hollywood: "Relax" b/w "Ferry Cross the Mersey", 1984 (South African issue)
- WIP 6661 – Not released
- WIP 6662 – Not released
- WIP 6663 – Toots and the Maytals: "Monkey Man (Live)" b/w "Hallelujah (Live)", 1980 (picture sleeve, Live at the Palais EP)
- WIP 6664 – Brian Briggs: "See You On The Other Side" b/w "Spy Vs Spy", 3/1981 (Bearsville label)
- WIP 6665 – The B-52's: "Strobe Light" b/w "Dirty Back Road", 1980 (picturev sleeve)
- WIP 6666 – The Jags: "I Never Was A Beachboy" b/w "Tune Into Heaven", 1/1981 (picture sleeve)
- WIP 6667 – Not released
- WIP 6668 – Not released
- WIP 6669 – Marina Del Ray: "I Love A Shark" b/w Sea Chicken: "Lone Shark", 1980
- WIP 6670 – Judy Mowatt: "My My People" b/w "Black Woman", 30/1/1981
- WIP 6671 – Sheila Hylton: "The Bed's Too Big Without You" b/w "Give Me Your Love", 1981
- 12WIP 6671 – Sheila Hylton: "The Bed's Too Big Without You (long version)" b/w "Give Me Your Love (long version)", 1981
- WIP 6672 – Manu Dibango: "Happy Feeling" b/w "Gore City", 6/2/1981
- WIP 6673 – Grace Jones: "Demolition Man" b/w "Warm Leatherette", 2/1981
- WIP 6674 – Plastics: "Peace" b/w "Diamond Head", 3/1981 (promo only?)
- WIP 6675 – Junior Tucker: "The Kick (Rock On)" b/w Compass Point All Stars: "Peanut Butter", 9/2/1981
- WIP 6676 – The Johnny Average Band featuring Nikki Wills: "Ch Ch Cheri" b/w "Gotta Go Home", 1981 (Bearsville label)
- WIP 6677 – U2: "Bad" b/w "A Sort of Homecoming", 1985 (South African issue)
- WIP 6678 – Robert Palmer: "Not A Second Time" b/w "Woke Up Laughing", 6/1981 (picture sleeve)
- WIP 6679 – U2: "Fire" b/w "J.Swallo", 7/1981 (picture sleeve)
- WIP 6680 – Steve Winwood: "Spanish Dancer (remix)" b/w "Hold On", 3/1981 (picture sleeve)
- WIP 6681 – Not released
- WIP 6682 – Not released
- WIP 6683 – The Jags: "The Sound Of G-O-O-D-B-Y-E" b/w "The Hurt", 10/4/1981
- WIP 6684 – Not released
- WIP 6685 – Bunny Wailer: "Dancing Shoes" b/w "Walk The Proud Land", 12/6/1981
- WIP 6686 – J.J. Cale: "Carry On" b/w "Cloudy Day", 3/1981 (Shelter label) (Promo copies had DJ suffix to catalogue number.)
- WIP 6687 – Not released
- WIP 6688 – Propaganda: "Duel" b/w "Jewel", 1985 (South African issue)
- WIP 6689 – Jimmy Lindsay: "Easy" b/w "Easy (dub)", 2/1981 (reissue of WIP 6431)
- WIP 6690 – Not released
- WIP 6691 – Ultravox: "Slow Motion" / "Quiet Men" b/w "Hiroshima Mon Amour", 3/1981 (also issued as a double-pack with catalogue no. DWIP 6691 and additional track "Dislocation")
- WIP 6692 – Toots and the Maytals: "Papa Dee Mama Dear" b/w "Dilly Dally", 1981
- WIP 6693 – Aswad: "Babylon" b/w "Explode"
- WIP 6694 – Tom Tom Club: "Wordy Rappinghood", 1981
- WIP 6695 – Black Uhuru: "Sponji Reggae", 1981
- WIP 6696 – Grace Jones: "Pull Up To The Bumper"
- WIP 6697 – J. J. Cale: "Mama Don't" b/w "What Did You Expect", 1981 (Shelter label)
- WIP 6698 – Aerial FX: "Take It From Here" b/w "Somewhere", 1981
- WIP 6699 – Not released
- WIP 6700 – Grace Jones: "I've Seen That Face Before (Libertango)" (English and Spanish versions), 1981
- WIP 6701 – Jah Wobble/Jaki Liebezeit/Holger Czuckay: "How Much Are They?"
- WIP 6702 – Not released
- WIP 6703 – Frankie Goes To Hollywood: "Rage Hard" b/w "(Don't Lose What's Left) Of Your Little Mind", 1986 (South African issue)
- WIP 6704 – Gibson Brothers: "Ooh! What A Life" b/w "Que Sera Mi Vida (If You Should Go)", 1981
- WIP 6705 – Hi-Tension: "Hi-Tension" b/w "British Hustle", 1981
- WIP 6706 – Not released
- WIP 6707 – Kid Creole and the Coconuts 'Live': "There But for the Grace of God Go I" b/w "He's Not Such a Bad Guy (After All)", 1981 (ZE label)
- WIP 6708 – Joe Cocker: "Sweet Little Woman" b/w "Look What You've Done", 1982
- 12 WIP 6709 – Was (Not Was): "Out Come The Freaks" b/w "Out Come The Freaks (Dub Version)", 1981 (ZE label)
- WIP 6710 – Steve Winwood: "Night Train" b/w "Night Train (Instrumental)", 1981
- WIP 6711 – Coati Mundi: "Me No Pop I" b/w "Que Pasa", 1981
- WIP 6712 – Wailing Souls: "Sweet Sugar Plum", 1981
- WIP 6713 – Material: "Bustin' Out", 1981
- WIP 6714 – Not released
- WIP 6715 – Soul Syndicate: "Natural Dub" (not released)
- WIP 6716 – Was (Not Was): "Wheel me Out"
- WIP 6717 – Bits and Pieces: "Don't Stop the Music" b/w Sly and Robbie: "Stampede", 1981
- WIP 6718 – John Martyn: "Sweet Little Mystery" b/w "Johnny Too Bad", 1981
- WIP 6719 – Kid Creole and the Coconuts: "Latin Music" b/w "Music Americana", 1981
- WIP 6720 – Pete Shelley: "Homosapien" b/w "Keats' Song", 1981 (Genetic label)
- WIP 6720 – Pete Shelley: "Homosapien" b/w "Love In Vain", 1982 (reissue with different b-side)
- WIP 6721 – Down to Earth: "Interference" b/w "Fear is the Thing", 1981 (Genetic label)
- WIP 6722 – Ryuichi Sakamoto: "Warhead" b/w "Lexington Queen", 1981
- WIP 6723 – Not released
- WIP 6724 – Prince Miller: "Mule Train", 1981
- WIP 6725 – Alexei's Midnight Runners: "Pop Up Toasters" b/w The Outer Limits: "Page 3 Girls"/20th Century Coyote: "I'm Evil (Trouble)", 1981
- WIP 6726 – Not released
- WIP 6727 – The B-52's: "Give Me Back My Man" b/w "Party out of Bounds" (instrumental), 1981
- WIP 6728 – Kid Creole and the Coconuts: "I Am" b/w "Darrio . . . Can You Get Me Into Studio 54?", 1981
- WIP 6729 – The New Philharmonia Orchestra: "Reprise O Fortuna from 'Carmina Burana' (Fortuna Imperatrix Mundi)" b/w "Prelude Act III 'Lohengrin'", 1981
- WIP 6730 – Not released
- WIP 6731 – Not released
- WIP 6732 – Not released
- WIP 6733 – U2: "Gloria", 10/1981
- WIP 6734 – Pablo: "Bo Mbanda" b/w "Ma Coco", 1981
- WIP 6735 – Tom Tom Club: "Genius Of Love" b/w "Lorelei (Instrumental)", 1981 (picture sleeve; also released as 12" single with catalogue number 12WIP 6735)
- WIP 6736 – The Portsmouth Sinfonia: "Classical Muddly" b/w "Hallelujah Chorus", 1981 (Springtime label)
- WIP 6737 – Marianne Faithfull: "Intrigue" b/w "For Beautie's Sake", 1981
- WIP 6738 – Toots and the Maytals: "Beautiful Woman", 1981
- WIP 6739 – Grace Jones: "Walking In The Rain"
- WIP 6740 – Pete Shelley: "I Don't Know What It Is", 1981
- WIP 6741 – Not released
- WIP 6742 – Mathematiques Modernes: "Disco Rough", b/w "A + B = C", 1981 (Celluoid label)
- WIP 6743 – Not released
- WIP 6744 – Alan Vega: "Jukebox Babe" b/w "Lonely", 1981 (Celluoid label)
- WIP 6745 – Not released
- WIP 6746 – Marianne Faithfull: "Sweetheart" b/w "Strange One", 1981 (Swedish issue)
- WIP 6747 – Steve Winwood: "There's a River" b/w "Two Way Stretch", 12/1981
- WIP 6748 – Alton Ellis: "And I Love Her" b/w "Chatty People", 1981
- WIP 6749 – Not released
- WIP 6750 – Cristina: "Things Fall Apart" b/w "Disco Clone", 1981
- WIP 6751 – Not released
- WIP 6752 – Marianne Faithfull: "Sweetheart" b/w "Over Here", 1981
- WIP 6753 – Not released
- WIP 6754 – Robert Palmer: "Some Guys Have All the Luck" b/w "Too Good To Be True", 1981 (also released as picture disc with catalogue number PWIP 6754)
- WIP 6755 – Not released
- WIP 6756 – Kid Creole & The Coconuts: "I'm A Wonderful Thing, Baby" b/w "Table Manners", 1982 (Ze label, picture sleeve; also released as 12" single with catalogue number 12WIP 6756 and picture disc with catalogue number PWIP 6756)
- WIP 6757 – Gwen Guthrie: "It Should Have Been You" b/w "God Don't Like Ugly", 1982
- WIP 6758 – Not released
- WIP 6759 – Wally Badarou: "Theme from Countryman" b/w "Revenge of Jah", 1982
- WIP 6760 – Not released
- WIP 6761 – Not released
- WIP 6762 – Tom Tom Club: "Under the Boardwalk" b/w "On On On On", 1982
- WIP 6763 – The Waitresses: "Christmas Wrapping" b/w Charlelie Couture: "Christmas Fever", 1981 (ZE label)
- WIP 6764 – Codek: "Tim Toum"
- WIP 6765 – J Walter Negro & The Loose Joints: "Shoot The Pump", 1981
- WIP 6766 – Not released
- WIP 6767 – Hanna Schygulla and Peer Raben: "Lili Marleen" b/w "Willie's Theme, Part 5", 1982 (Metropolis label)
- WIP 6768 – Alexei Sayle: "'Ullo John! Gotta New Motor?", 1982
- WIP 6769 – Cage featuring Nona Hendryx: "Do What Ya Wanna Do", 1982 (Metropolis label)
- WIP 6770 – U2: "A Celebration", 3/1982
- WIP 6771 – Not released
- WIP 6772 – Pablo: "Madeleina" b/w "Mbongo Mokonzi", 1982
- WIP 6773 – The Members: "Radio" b/w "Can't Stand Up", 1982 (Genetic label)
- WIP 6774 – Bob Marley and the Wailers: "Natural Mystic" b/w "Carry Us Beyond", 1982
- WIP 6775 – J.J. Cale: "City Girls" b/w "One Step Ahead Of The Blues", 3/1982 (Shelter label)
- WIP 6776 – Was (Not Was): "Tell Me That I'm Dreaming", 1982 (ZE label)
- WIP 6777 – Dennis Brown: "Sitting and Watching" b/w Toots and the Maytals: "Bam Bam", 1982
- WIP 6778 – Not released
- WIP 6779 – Grace Jones: "The Apple Stretching" b/w "Nipple To The Bottle", 1982
- WIP 6780 – Not released
- WIP 6781 – Not released
- WIP 6782 – George Nooks: "We're in This Love Together", 1982
- WIP 6783 – Space: "Magic Fly" b/w "Save Your Love for Me", 1982 (Metropolis label)
- WIP 6784 – Not released
- WIP 6785 – Snuky Tate: "He's The Groove"
- WIP 6786 – Steve Winwood: "Still In The Game" b/w "Dust", 1982
- WIP 6787 – Black Uhuru: "Darkness-Dubness" b/w "Dub of Eglington", 1982 (10" single)
- WIP 6788 – Not released
- WIP 6789 – Not released
- WIP 6790 – Roy Alton: "If You Want Me", 1982
- WIP 6791 – Not released
- WIP 6792 – Judy Mowatt: "Joseph" b/w "Down in the Valley", 1982 (Grove label)
- WIP 6793 – Kid Creole & The Coconuts: "Stool Pigeon", 1982
- WIP 6794 – Not released
- WIP 6795 – Not released
- WIP 6796 – Not released
- WIP 6797 – Raw Sex Pure Energy: "Stop The War" b/w "Give Sheep A Chance"
- WIP 6798 – Not released
- WIP 6799 – Not released
- WIP 6800 – Gregory Isaacs: "Night Nurse", 1982
  - 10 WIP 6800 – Gregory Isaacs: "Night Nurse", 1982
- WIP 6801 – Kid Creole And The Coconuts: "Annie I'm Not Your Daddy"
- WIP 6802 – Joe Cocker: "Many Rivers to Cross" b/w "Talking Back to the Night", 08/1982
- WIP 6803 – Not released
- WIP 6804 – Not released
- WIP 6805 – Not released
- WIP 6806 – Not released
- WIP 6807 – Tony Tuff: "Show On The Road" b/w "No More", 1982 (Grove label)
- WIP 6808 – Sweet Pea Atkinson: "Don't Walk Away" b/w "Dance Or Die", 1982 (Ze label)
- WIP 6809 – Not released
- WIP 6810 – Not released
- WIP 6811 – Millie: "Sweet William" b/w "Wings of a Dove", 08/1982
- WIP 6812 – Barry Reynolds: "I Scare Myself" b/w "Till the Doctor Gets Back", 08/1982
- WIP 6813 – Not released
- WIP 6814 – The Three Courgettes: "Substitute" b/w "Get Off My Back", 08/1982
- WIP 6815 – Black Uhuru: "Mondays" b/w "Right Stuff", 1982
- WIP 6816 – Not released
- WIP 6817 – Not released
- WIP 6818 – Steve Winwood: "Valerie" b/w "Slowdown Sundown", 09/1982
- WIP 6819 – Joy: "State of Independence" b/w "Pata Pata", 08/1982
- WIP 6820 – Not released
- WIP 6821 – The Waitresses: "Christmas Wrapping" b/w "Hangover 1/1/83", 11/1982 (ZE label)
- WIP 6822 – Jah Wobble & Ben Mandelsohn: "Body Music Moliki"
- WIP 6823 – Not released
- WIP 6824 – Not released
- WIP 6825 – Not released
- WIP 6826 – King Sunny Ade & His African Beats: "Ja Funmi", 1982
- WIP 6827 – Gwen Guthrie: "For You (With a Melody Too) (Remix)" b/w "Peek a Boo (Remix)", 10/1982
- WIP 6828 – Gregory Isaacs: "Cool Down the Pace" b/w "Cool Down the Dub", 10/1982
- WIP 6829 – Not released
- WIP 6830 – Joe Cocker and Jennifer Warnes: "Up Where We Belong" b/w Joe Cocker: "Sweet Little Woman", 1982
- WIP 6831 – Not released
- WIP 6832 – Not released
- WIP 6833 – Robert Palmer: "Pride", 1982
- WIP 6834 – Not released
- WIP 6835 – A Cha Cha at the Opera: "A Cha Cha at the Opera (Disco Concerto)" b/w "Concerto No. 2", 11/1982
- WIP 6836 – Set The Tone: "Dance Sucker" b/w "Let Loose", 1982
- WIP 6837 – Sweet Pea Atkinson: "Someone Could Lose A Heart Tonight"
- WIP 6838 – Not released
- WIP 6839 – Not released
- WIP 6840 – Kid Creole And The Coconuts: "Dear Addy" b/w "No Fish Today/Christmas On Riverside Drive", 1982 ("Christmas In B'Dilli Bay" EP)
- WIP 6841 – Rita Marley: "One Draw", not released
- WIP 6842 – Not released
- WIP 6843 – Not released
- WIP 6844 – Not released
- WIP 6845 – Not released
- WIP 6846 – Peech Boys: "Life Is Something Special (Vocal)" b/w "Life Is Something Special (Special Edition)", 1983
- WIP 6847 – Not released
- WIP 6848 – U2: "New Year's Day" b/w "Treasure (Whatever Happened To Pete The Chop)", 1/1983
- WIP 6849 – Steve Winwood: "Your Silence Is Your Song" b/w "Your Silence Is Your Song (Instrumental)", 6/1983

==== IDS/IDJ series ====
The IDS prefix stands for 'Island Disco Sampler'. The series was used for pre-releases in 1976–77, white labels. IDJ was a limited edition series for related releases on the colourful Island label.

- IDJ 12 – Eddie Quansah: "Che Che Kulé (Funky Highlife)" b/w "Can I Come Back For More?", 1976 (7")
- IDJ 13 – Eddie Quansah: "Che Che Kulé (Funky Highlife)", 1976 (12" – A sided only)
- IDJ 19 – Eddie Quansah: "Che Che Kulé" b/w "Sing a Merry Song", 1977 (12")
- IDJ 19 – Eddie Quansah: Disco Sampler (includes "Awake" and "Che Che Kulé"), 1977 (12" – A sided only)

==== IPR series ====
These singles were released in the 12" format during 1977–79.

- IPR 2002 – Rico (Rico Rodriguez): "Dial Africa" b/w "Dial Dub", 1977
- IPR 2006 – Rico: "Ska Wars (Star Wars)" b/w "Ramble", 1977
- IPR 2014 – Stomu Yamashta / Steve Winwood / Michael Shrieve: "Crossing The Line" b/w "Winner/Loser", 1978
- IPR 2016 – Rico: "Take Five" b/w "Soundcheck", 1979
- IPR 2030 – Rico: "Children of Sanchez" b/w "You Really Got Me", "Midnight In Ethiopia", 1979

==== Black Swan label ====
Island released in 1976/1977 a small number of 12" "limited edition" singles in a BS series

- BS 1 – The Congoes: Congo Man / Congo Man Chant, 1977
- BS 2 – George Faith: To Be A Lover / The Upsetters – Rastaman Shuffle, 1977
- BS 3 – George Faith: I've Got the Groove / Diana, 1977
- BS 4 – George Faith: Midnight Hour / Turn Back The Hands Of Time, 1977
- BS 5 – George Faith: All The Love I've Got / So Fine, 1977
- BS 6 – Keith Rowe: Groovy Situation / Groovy Dub, 1977
- BS 7 – Dillinger: Cocaine In My Brain // Buckingham Palace / Ragnampiza, 1976
- BS 8 – Jimmy Lindsay: Easy / Fabian: Prophecy, 1977
- BS 9 – Dillinger: Cokane In My Brain (Raggarave Mix)
- 7BSX 9 – Dillinger – Cokane In My Brain (Remix), 7"

=== LPs in the 1970s ===
==== ILPS series ====
Following on from the 1960s releases, LPs were originally released with pink labels featuring the 'white i' logo, except for the two Chrysalis albums (ILPS 9122/3), which had that company's green labels with butterfly logo. Possibly as a result of a pressing plant change, Jethro Tull's Chrysalis album Benefit was also pressed on the pink rim/palm tree Island label sometime between November 1970 (when that label design went into use) and July 1973 (when Tull's first four albums, including Benefit, were reissued in the Chrysalis CHR 1000 LP series).

Until late 1970 Island LPs were pressed by Polydor. Pressing was then switched to EMI Records before, in late 1975, moving to an unknown, budget manufacturer. EMI pressings can be identified by type-printed Matrix/catalogue numbers pressed into the spare vinyl around the label, whilst later pressings have hand written matrix numbers around label and tend to be pressed on lighter weight vinyl.

- ILPS 9116 – Traffic: John Barleycorn Must Die, 1970
- ILPS 9117 – Spooky Tooth: The Last Puff, 1970
- ILPS 9118 – Cat Stevens: Mona Bone Jakon, 1970
- ILPS 9119 – Mott the Hoople: Mad Shadows, 1970
- ILPS 9120 – Free: Fire and Water, 1970
- ILPS 9121 – not issued
- ILPS 9122 – Blodwyn Pig: Getting To This, 1970 (Label: Chrysalis)
- ILPS 9123 – Jethro Tull: Benefit, 1970 (Label: Chrysalis)
- ILPS 9124 – Bronco: Country Home, 1970
- ILPS 9125 – Fotheringay: Fotheringay, 1970
- ILPS 9126 – McDonald & Giles: McDonald and Giles, 1970
- ILPS 9127 – King Crimson: In the Wake of Poseidon, 1970
- ILPS 9128 – Quintessence: Quintessence, 1970
- ILPS 9129 – If: If, 1970
- ILPS 9130 – Fairport Convention: Full House, 1970

The pink label was replaced by the 'pink rim/palm tree' label at this point, but there was a small cross-over period. At the same time, Island changed its main pressing plants from those of Polydor to EMI.

- ILPS 9131 – The Alan Bown: Listen, 1970 (pink rim/palm tree label)
- ILPS 9132 – Emerson, Lake & Palmer: Emerson, Lake & Palmer, 1970 (pink label)
- ILPS 9133 – John and Beverley Martyn: The Road to Ruin, 1970 (pink label)
- ILPS 9134 – Nick Drake: Bryter Layter, 1970 (pink rim/palm tree label)
- ILPS 9135 – Cat Stevens: Tea for the Tillerman, 1970 (pink label)

From this point, all Island releases featured the pink rim/palm tree label. ILPS series albums on the Blue Thumb, Bronze and Chrysalis labels used those labels' designs.

- ILPS 9136 – Amazing Blondel: Evensong, 1971
- ILPS 9137 – If: If 2, 1971
- ILPS 9138 – Free: Highway, 1970
- ILPS 9139 – Renaissance: Illusion, 1971 (not released in the UK)
- ILPS 9140 – The Incredible String Band: Be Glad for the Song Has No Ending, 1971
- ILPS 9141 – King Crimson: Lizard, 1971
- ILPS 9142 – Uriah Heep: ...Very 'Eavy ...Very 'Umble, 1971 (Label: Bronze; – original on Vertigo, 1970)
- ILPS 9143 – Quintessence: Dive Deep, 1971
- ILPS 9144 – Mott the Hoople: Wild Life, 1971
- ILPS 9145 – Jethro Tull: Aqualung, 1971 (Label: Chrysalis)
- ILPS 9146 – Mike Heron: Smiling Men with Bad Reputations, 1971
- ILPS 9147 – Mick Abrahams: A Musical Evening with Mick Abrahams (Label: Chrysalis), 1971
- ILPS 9148 – Mountain: Nantucket Sleighride, 1971
- ILPS 9149 – Heads Hands & Feet: Heads Hands & Feet, 1971
- ILPS 9150 – Paladin: Paladin (Label: Bronze), 1971
- ILPS 9151 – Clouds: Watercolour Days (Label: Chrysalis), 1971
- ILPS 9152 – Uriah Heep: Salisbury, 1971 (Label: Bronze; re-issue, Original on Vertigo)
- ILPS 9153 – Tír na nÓg: Tír na nÓg (Label: Chrysalis), 1971
- ILPS 9154 – Cat Stevens: Teaser and the Firecat, 1971
- ILPS 9155 – Emerson, Lake & Palmer: Tarkus, 1971
- ILPS 9156 – Amazing Blondel: Fantasia Lindum, 1971
- ILPS 9157 – Juicy Lucy: Get a Whiff of This, (Label: Bronze), 1971
- ILPS 9158 – Procol Harum: Broken Barricades (Label: Chrysalis), 1971
- ILPS 9159 – Jimmy Cliff: Another Cycle, 1971
- ILPS 9160 – Free: Free Live!, 1971
- ILPS 9161 – Bronco: Ace of Sunlight, 1971
- ILPS 9162 – Fairport Convention: Angel Delight, 1971
- ILPS 9163 – The Alan Bown Set: Stretching Out, 1971
- ILPS 9164 – War: War, 1971
- ILPS 9165 – Sandy Denny: The North Star Grassman and the Ravens, 1971
- ILPS 9166 – Traffic: Welcome to the Canteen, 1971 (Credited on labels and cover to Steve Winwood, Jim Capaldi, Dave Mason, Chris Wood, Rick Grech, "Reebop" Kwaku Baah, Jim Gordon; with the Traffic symbol, but not the band name)
- ILPS 9167 – John Martyn: Bless the Weather, 1971
- ILPS 9168 – Luther Grosvenor: Under Open Skies, 1971
- ILPS 9169 – Uriah Heep: Look at Yourself (Label: Bronze), 1971
- ILPS 9170 – Mike Harrison: Mike Harrison, 1971
- ILPS 9171 – War: The World Is a Ghetto, 1972
- ILPS 9172 – The Incredible String Band: Liquid Acrobat as Regards the Air, 1971
- ILPS 9173 – Colosseum: The Collector's Colosseum (Label: Bronze), 1971
- ILPS 9174 – Tony Hazzard: Loadwater House, (Label: Bronze), 1971
- ILPS 9175 – King Crimson: Islands, 1971
- ILPS 9176 – Fairport Convention: "Babbacombe" Lee, 1971
- ILPS 9177 – War: All Day Music, 1971 (catalogue number originally assigned to Emerson, Lake & Palmer: Pictures at an Exhibition, the LP of which was released as HELP 1, but the 8-track of "Pictures..." was released as Y8I 9177)
- ILPS 9178 – Mott the Hoople: Brain Capers, 1971
- ILPS 9179 – Mountain: Flowers of Evil (Live/Studio), 1971
- ILPS 9180 – Traffic: The Low Spark of High Heeled Boys, 1971
- ILPS 9181 – Sutherland Brothers: The Sutherland Brothers Band, 1972
- ILPS 9182 – Claire Hamill: One House Left Standing, 1972
- ILPS 9183 – Vinegar Joe: Vinegar Joe, 1972
- ILPS 9184 – Nick Drake: Pink Moon, 1972
- ILPS 9185 – Heads Hands & Feet: Tracks, 1972
- ILPS 9186 – Emerson, Lake & Palmer: Trilogy, 1972
- ILPS 9186 – Toots & the Maytals: Funky Kingston, 1972
- ILPS 9187 – Jim Capaldi: Oh How We Danced, 1972
- ILPS 9188 – Kossoff, Kirke, Tetsu and Rabbit: Kossoff, Kirke, Tetsu and Rabbit, 1972
- ILPS 9189 – The Bunch: Rock On, 1972
- ILPS 9190 – Paladin: Charge! (Label: Bronze), 1972
- ILPS 9191 – Mike McGear: Woman, 1972
- ILPS 9192 – Free: Free at Last, 1972
- ILPS 9193 – Uriah Heep: Demons and Wizards (Label: Bronze), 1972;
- ILPS 9194 – War: Deliver the World, 1973
- ILPS 9195 – not issued
- ILPS 9196 – Dick Heckstall-Smith: A Story Ended (Label: Bronze), 1972
- ILPS 9197 – Richard Thompson: Henry the Human Fly, 1972
- ILPS 9198 – Smith-Perkins-Smith: Smith-Perkins-Smith, 1972
- ILPS 9199 – Mountain: Mountain Live: The Road Goes Ever On, 1972

===== ILPS 92.. =====
- ILPS 9200 – Roxy Music: Roxy Music, 1972
- ILPS 9201 – The Persuasions: Street Corner Symphony, 1972 (Label: Blue Thumb)
- ILPS 9202 – V.A.: The Harder They Come (original motion picture soundtrack), 1972
- ILPS 9203 – Dave Mason: Headkeeper (Label: Blue Thumb), 1972
- ILPS 9204 – Dan Hicks & The Hot Licks: Striking It Rich (Label: Blue Thumb), 1972
- ILPS 9205 – Amazing Blondel: England, 1972
- ILPS 9206 – Cat Stevens: Catch Bull at Four, 1972
- ILPS 9207 – Sandy Denny: Sandy, 1972
- ILPS 9208 – Fairport Convention: Rosie, 1972
- ILPS 9209 – Mike Harrison: Smokestack Lightning, 1972
- ILPS 9210 – Patto: Roll 'em Smoke 'em Put Another Line Out, 1972
- ILPS 9211 – The Incredible String Band: Earthspan, 1972
- ILPS 9212 – The Sutherland Brothers: Lifeboat, 1972
- ILPS 9213 – Uriah Heep: The Magician's Birthday (Label: Bronze), 1972
- ILPS 9214 – Vinegar Joe: Rock & Roll Gypsies, 1972
- ILPS 9215 – Mott the Hoople: Rock and Roll Queen, 1972
- ILPS 9216 – not issued
- ILPS 9217 – Free: Heartbreaker, 1972
- ILPS 9218 – The Crusaders: The Crusaders (Label: Blue Thumb), 1972
- ILPS 9219 – Phil Upchurch: Darkness Darkness (Label: Blue Thumb), 1972
- ILPS 9220 – Tempest: Tempest (Label: Bronze), 1972
- ILPS 9221 – Mike Moran: Fair Warning (Label: Bronze), 1973
- ILPS 9222 – Tony Hazzard: Was That Alright Then (Label: Bronze), 1972
- ILPS 9223 – Ken Hensley: Proud Words on a Dusty Shelf, (Label: Bronze), 1973
- ILPS 9224 – Traffic: Shoot Out at the Fantasy Factory, 1973
- ILPS 9225 – Claire Hamill: October, 1973
- ILPS 9226 – John Martyn: Solid Air, 1973
- ILPS 9227 – Spooky Tooth: You Broke My Heart So I Busted Your Jaw, 1973
- ILPS 9228 – Stomu Yamashta: The Soundtrack From "The Man From The East", 1973
- ILPS 9229 – Incredible String Band: No Ruinous Feud, 1973
- ILPS 9230 – King Crimson: Larks' Tongues in Aspic, 1973
- ILPS 9231 – Toots & the Maytals: In The Dark, 1974
- ILPS 9232 – Roxy Music: For Your Pleasure, 1973
- ILPS 9233 – Sharks: First Water, 1973
- ILPS 9234 – The Scaffold: Fresh Liver, 1973
- ILPS 9235 – Jimmy Cliff: Struggling Man, 1973
- ILPS 9236 – Mountain: The Best of Mountain, 1973
- ILPS 9237 – Morning Glory: Morning Glory, 1973
- ILPS 9238 – Rabbit: Broken Arrows, 1973
- ILPS 9239 – not issued
- ILPS 9240 – Cat Stevens: Foreigner, 1973
- ILPS 9241 – The Wailers: Catch a Fire, 1973 (Original flip-top "cigarette lighter" cover credited to "The Wailers", later band photo cover credited to "Bob Marley and The Wailers")
- ILPS 9242 – Stomu Yamashta: Freedom Is Frightening, 1973
- ILPS 9243 – The Pointer Sisters: The Pointer Sisters (Label: Blue Thumb), 1973
- ILPS 9244 – McGuinness Flint: Rainbow (Label: Bronze), 1973
- ILPS 9245 – Uriah Heep: Sweet Freedom, (Label: Bronze), 1973
- ILPS 9246 – Fairport Convention: Nine, 1973
- ILPS 9247 – not issued (The Albion Country Band; material later released as HELP 25 Battle of the Field in 1976)
- ILPS 9248 – Grimms: Rockin' Duck, 1973
- ILPS 9249 – Bryan Ferry: These Foolish Things, 1973
- ILPS 9250 – The Meters: Cissy Strut, 1974
- ILPS 9251 – V.A.: This Is Reggae Music, 1973
- ILPS 9252 – Roxy Music: Stranded, 1973
- ILPS 9253 – John Martyn: Inside Out, 1973
- ILPS 9254 – Jim Capaldi: Whale Meat Again, 1974
- ILPS 9255 – Spooky Tooth: Witness, 1973
- ILPS 9256 – The Wailers: Burnin', 1973
- ILPS 9257 – Blondel: Blondel, 1973
- ILPS 9258 – Sandy Denny: Like an Old Fashioned Waltz, 1973
- ILPS 9259 – Sutherland Brothers & Quiver: Dream Kid, 1973
- ILPS 9260 – The Butts Band: The Butts Band (Label: Blue Thumb), 1973
- ILPS 9261 – Bob Dylan: Planet Waves, 1974
- ILPS 9262 – Vinegar Joe: Six Star General, 1973
- ILPS 9263 – Kevin Ayers: The Confessions of Dr. Dream and Other Stories, 1974
- ILPS 9264 – Paul Kossoff: Back Street Crawler, 1973
- ILPS 9265 – Manfred Mann's Earth Band: Solar Fire (Label: Bronze), 1973
- ILPS 9266 – Richard & Linda Thompson: I Want to See the Bright Lights Tonight, 1974
- ILPS 9267 – Tempest: Living In Fear, (Label: Bronze), 1974
- ILPS 9268 – Brian Eno: Here Come the Warm Jets, 1973
- ILPS 9269 – Stomu Yamashta: One by One, 1974
- ILPS 9270 – The Incredible String Band: Hard Rope & Silken Twine, illustrated by Wayne Anderson, 1974
- ILPS 9271 – Sharks: Jab It in Yore Eye, 1974
- ILPS 9272 – Sparks: Kimono My House, 1974
- ILPS 9273 – Traffic: When the Eagle Flies, 1974
- ILPS 9274 – Cat Stevens: Buddha and the Chocolate Box, 1974
- ILPS 9275 – King Crimson: Starless and Bible Black, 1974
- ILPS 9276 – The Pointer Sisters: That's A Plenty (Label: Blue Thumb), 1974
- ILPS 9277 – not issued
- ILPS 9278 – Andy Mackay: In Search of Eddie Riff, 1974 (reissued in 1975 with different track listing, but same catalogue number. 1975 version only one released in North America)
- ILPS 9279 – Bad Company: Bad Company, 1974
- ILPS 9280 – Uriah Heep: Wonderworld (Label: Bronze), 1974
- ILPS 9281 – Bob Marley & The Wailers: Natty Dread, 1974
- ILPS 9282 – Prelude: After the Gold Rush (North America edition, and title of Dawn Records Dutch Courage), 1974
- ILPS 9283 – not issued
- ILPS 9284 – Bryan Ferry: Another Time, Another Place, 1974
- ILPS 9285 – Fairport Convention: Fairport Live Convention, 1975 (Re-titled as "A Moveable Feast" in North America)
- ILPS 9286 – Jess Roden: Jess Roden, 1974
- ILPS 9287 – Bryn Haworth: Let the Days Go By, 1974
- ILPS 9288 – Sutherland Brothers & Quiver: Beat of the Street, 1974
- ILPS 9289 – Rabbit: Dark Saloon, 1974
- ILPS 9290 – Jade Warrior: Floating World, 1974
- ILPS 9291 – Kevin Ayers, John Cale, Brian Eno and Nico: June 1, 1974, 1974
- ILPS 9292 – Spooky Tooth: The Mirror, 1974 (for North America only, issued in the UK as Goodear EAR 2001)
- ILPS 9293 – Georgie Fame: Georgie Fame, 1974
- ILPS 9294 – Robert Palmer: Sneakin' Sally Through the Alley, 1974
- ILPS 9295 – not issued
- ILPS 9296 – John Martyn: Sunday's Child, 1974
- ILPS 9297 – The Heptones: Book of Rules, 1974
- ILPS 9298 – Peter Cook & Dudley Moore: Good Evening 1974
- ILPS 9299 – Swamp Dogg: Have You Heard This Story, 1975

===== ILPS 93.. =====
- ILPS 9300 – New World Electronic Chamber Orchestra: Switched On Beatles, 1974
- ILPS 9301 – John Cale: Fear, 1974
- ILPS 9302 – McGuinness Flint: C'est La Vie, (Label: Bronze), 1974
- ILPS 9303 – Roxy Music: Country Life, 1974
- ILPS 9304 – Bad Company: Straight Shooter, 1975
- ILPS 9305 – Richard & Linda Thompson: Hokey Pokey, 1974
- ILPS 9306 – Manfred Mann's Earth Band: The Good Earth (Label: Bronze), 1974
- ILPS 9307 – Ken Hensley: Eager to Please (1975) (Label: Bronze), 1974
- ILPS 9308 – King Crimson: Red, 1974
- ILPS 9309 – Brian Eno: Taking Tiger Mountain, 1974
- ILPS 9310 – Cat Stevens: Greatest Hits, 1975
- ILPS 9311 – Nico: The End..., 1974
- ILPS 9312 – Sparks: Propaganda, 1974
- ILPS 9313 – Fairport Convention: Rising for the Moon, 1975
- ILPS 9314 – Gene Pitney: Pitney '75, (Label: Bronze), 1975
- ILPS 9315 – Phil Manzanera: Diamond Head, 1975
- ILPS 9316 – King Crimson: USA (Live), 1975
- ILPS 9317 – John Cale: Slow Dazzle, 1975
- ILPS 9318 – Jade Warrior: Waves, 1975
- ILPS 9319 – Stomu Yamashta: Raindog, 1975
- ILPS 9320 – Milk and Cookies: Milk and Cookies, 1975
- ILPS 9321 – Ronnie Lane & Slim Chance: Ronnie Lane's Slim Chance, 1975
- ILPS 9322 – Kevin Ayers: Sweet Deceiver, 1975
- ILPS 9323 – Franco Battiato: Clic, 1975
- ILPS 9324 – The Pasadena Roof Orchestra: The Pasadena Roof Orchestra, 1974
- ILPS 9325 – White Lightning (with Donald Kinsey): White Lightning, 1975
- ILPS 9326 – Blackfoot: No Reservations, 1975
- ILPS 9327 – V.A.: This Is Reggae Music, Vol. 2, 1975
- ILPS 9328 – Joe South: Midnight Rainbow, 1975
- ILPS 9329 – Betty Davis: Nasty Gal, 1975
- ILPS 9330 – Toots & the Maytals: Funky Kingston, 1975
- ILPS 9331 – The Fania All-Stars: The Fania All-Stars, 1975
- ILPS 9332 – Bryn Haworth: Sunny Side Of The Street, 1975
- ILPS 9333 – Pete Wingfield: Breakfast Special, 1975
- ILPS 9334 – The Chieftains: Chieftains V, 1975
- ILPS 9335 – Uriah Heep: Return to Fantasy (Label: Bronze), 1975
- ILPS 9336 – Jim Capaldi: Short Cut Draw Blood, 1975
- ILPS 9337 – Manfred Mann's Earth Band: Nightingales and Bombers (Label: Bronze), 1975
- ILPS 9338 – Speedy Keen: Y'know Wot I Mean, 1975
- ILPS 9339 – not issued
- ILPS 9340 – Nasty Pop: Nasty Pop, 1975
- ILPS 9341 – not issued
- ILPS 9342 – David Byron: Take No Prisoners, 1975
- ILPS 9343 – John Martyn: Live at Leeds, 1975
- ILPS 9344 – Roxy Music: Siren, 1975; Collectable Records.ru
- ILPS 9345 – Sparks: Indiscreet, 1975
- ILPS 9346 – Bad Company: Run with the Pack, 1976; Collectable Records.ru
- ILPS 9347 – Murray Head: Sooner Or Later (Say It Ain't So), 1975
- ILPS 9348 – Richard & Linda Thompson: Pour Down Like Silver, 1975
- ILPS 9349 – Jess Roden: Keep Your Hat On, 1976
- ILPS 9350 – John Cale: Helen of Troy, 1975
- ILPS 9351 – Brian Eno: Another Green World, 1975
- ILPS 9352 – Peter Skellern: Hard Times, 1975
- ILPS 9353 – Mike Gibbs: Only Chrome Waterfall Orchestra (Label: Bronze), 1975
- ILPS 9354 – Paco de Lucia: Paco, 1975
- ILPS 9355 – Osibisa: Welcome Home (Label: Bronze), 1975
- ILPS 9356 – Colosseum II: Strange New Flesh (Label: Bronze), 1976
- ILPS 9357 – Manfred Mann's Earth Band: The Roaring Silence (Label: Bronze), 1976
- ILPS 9358 – Sutherland Brothers & Quiver: Sailing, 1976
- ILPS 9359 – Mike Harrison: Rainbow Rider, 1976 (Cat. no. assigned – recording issued on 'Goodear Records – EAR 7002)
- ILPS 9360 – The Wild Tchoupitoulas: The Wild Tchoupitoulas, 1976
- ILPS 9361 – Jorge Ben: Samba Nova, 1976
- ILPS 9362 – Rock Follies: Rock Follies, 1976
- ILPS 9363 – not issued
- ILPS 9364 – The Chieftains: The Chieftains 1, 1976
- ILPS 9365 – The Chieftains: The Chieftains 2, 1976
- ILPS 9366 – Ronnie Lane & Slim Chance: One for the Road, 1976
- ILPS 9367 – Bryan Ferry: Let's Stick Together, 1976; Collectable Records.ru
- ILPS 9368 – Spooky Tooth: Best of Spooky Tooth, 1976
- ILPS 9369 – Third World: Third World, 1976
- ILPS 9370 – Cat Stevens: Numbers (album), 1975; Collectable Records.ru
- ILPS 9371 – not issued
- ILPS 9372 – Robert Palmer: Pressure Drop, 1975
- ILPS 9373 – not issued
- ILPS 9374 – Toots & the Maytals: Reggae Got Soul, 1976
- ILPS 9375 – Uriah Heep: Best of Uriah Heep (Label: Bronze), 1975
- ILPS 9376 – Bob Marley & The Wailers: Live At The Lyceum, 1976; Collectable Records.ru
- ILPS 9377 – Burning Spear: Marcus Garvey, 1975
- ILPS 9378 – War: Why Can't We Be Friends?, 1975
- ILPS 9379 – The Chieftains: The Chieftains 3, 1976
- ILPS 9380 – The Chieftains: Women Of Ireland (The Chieftains 4), 1976
- ILPS 9381 – The Heptones: Night Food, 1976
- ILPS 9382 – Burning Spear: Garvey's Ghost, 1976
- ILPS 9383 – Bob Marley & The Wailers: Rastaman Vibration, 1976
- ILPS 9384 – Uriah Heep: High and Mighty (Label: Bronze), 1976
- ILPS 9385 – Dillinger: CB 200, 1976
- ILPS 9386 – Jah Lion: Colombia Colly, 1976
- ILPS 9387 – Stomu Yamashta / Steve Winwood / Michael Shrieve: Go, 1976
- ILPS 9388 – not issued
- ILPS 9389 – Fairport featuring Dave Swarbrick: Gottle O'Geer, 1976 (original UK credit – credited to "Fairport Convention" in North America)
- ILPS 9390 – Jorge Ben: Tropical, 1976
- ILPS 9391 – V.A.: This Is Reggae Music, Vol. 3, 1976
- ILPS 9392 – Max Romeo: War Ina Babylon, 1976
- ILPS 9393 – Jade Warrior: Kites, 1976
- ILPS 9394 – Kabaka: Son of Africa
- ILPS 9395 – High Cotton: High Cotton
- ILPS 9396 – Osamu Kitajima: Benzaiten
- ILPS 9397 – Automatic Man: Automatic Man, 1976
- ILPS 9398 – Gavin Christopher: Gavin Christopher, 1976
- ILPS 9399 – Aswad: Aswad, 1976

===== ILPS 94.. =====
- ILPS 9400 – Roxy Music: Viva!, 1976
- ILPS 9401 – not issued
- ILPS 9402 – not issued
- ILPS 9403 – not issued
- ILPS 9404 – not issued
- ILPS 9405 – not issued
- ILPS 9406 – not issued
- ILPS 9407 – not issued
- ILPS 9408 – not issued
- ILPS 9409 – not issued
- ILPS 9410 – not issued
- ILPS 9411 – Osibisa: Ojah Awake, (Label: Bronze) 1976
- ILPS 9412 – Burning Spear: Man In The Hills, 1976
- ILPS 9413 – War: Greatest Hits, 1976
- ILPS 9414 – Jimmy Cliff: Jimmy Cliff (Erstveröff. 1969), 1976
- ILPS 9415 – Bunny Wailer: Blackheart Man, 1976
- ILPS 9416 – Justin Hinds: Jezebel, 1976
- ILPS 9417 – Upsetters: Super Ape, 1976
- ILPS 9418 – not issued
- ILPS 9419 – James Montgomery Band: James Montgomery Band, 1976
- ILPS 9420 – Robert Palmer: Some People Can Do What They Like, 1976
- ILPS 9421 – Richard Thompson: Live! (More or Less) (compilation of (guitar, vocal); also includes I Want to See the Bright Lights Tonight by Richard & Linda Thompson), 1976
- ILPS 9422 – David Pritchard: Nocturnal Earthworm Stew/Bouillabaisse Nocturne Aux Vers De Terre, 1976
- ILPS 9424 – V.A.: New Orleans Jazz & Heritage Festival 1976 (2LP), 1976
- ILPS 9425 – Michael Nesmith: Compilation, 1977
- ILPS 9426 – Osamu Kitajima: Osamu, 1977
- ILPS 9427 – not issued
- ILPS 9428 – Michael Nesmith: The Prison, 1977
- ILPS 9429 – Automatic Man: Visitors, 1977
- ILPS 9430 – not issued
- ILPS 9431 – Burning Spear: Dry & Heavy, 1977
- ILPS 9432 – The Chieftains: Bonapartes Retreat, 1977
- ILPS 9433 – Sandy Denny: Rendezvous, 1977
- ILPS 9434 – Derek and Clive: Peter Cook & Dudley Moore Present Derek & Clive, 1976
- ILPS 9435 – not issued
- ILPS 9436 – not issued
- ILPS 9437 – not issued
- ILPS 9438 – not issued
- ILPS 9439 – Michael Nesmith: And the Hits Just Keep on Coming, 1977; (originally released by another label in 1972)
- ILPS 9440 – Michael Nesmith: Pretty Much Your Standard Ranch Stash, 1977; (originally released by another label in 1973)
- ILPS 9441 – Bad Company: Burnin' Sky, 1977
- ILPS 9442 – Jess Roden: Play It Dirty... Play It Class, 1977
- ILPS 9443 – Third World: 96 Degrees In The Shade, 1977
- ILPS 9444 – 801: 801 Live, 1976
- ILPS 9445 – Sparks: Big Beat, 1976
- ILPS 9446 – Eddie Quansah: Che Che Kulé, 1977
- ILPS 9447 – Fania All Stars: Delicate And Jump, 1976
- ILPS 9448 – not issued
- ILPS 9449 – Ultravox: Ultravox!, 1977
- ILPS 9450 – American Standard Band (1979)
- ILPS 9451 – Cat Stevens: Izitso
- ILPS 9452 – The Goodies: Nothing to Do with Us, 1976
- ILPS 9453 – Free: Free 'n Easy, Rough 'n Ready, 1977
- ILPS 9454 – Booker Little – The Legendary Quartet Album, 1977
- ILPS 9455 – Dillinger: Bionic Dread (Black Swan label), 1976; Tapir's Reggae Discography
- ILPS 9456 – The Heptones: Party Time, 1977
- ILPS 9457 – Eddie and the Hot Rods: Teenage Depression, 1976
- ILPS 9458 – not issued
- ILPS 9459 – John Cale: Guts, 1977
- ILPS 9460 – Heron: Diamond Of Dreams, 1977
- ILPS 9461 – Klaus Schulze: Mirage, 1977
- ILPS 9462 – Kaleidoscope: When Scopes Collide, 1976
- ILPS 9463 – not issued
- ILPS 9464 – Max Romeo: Reconstruction, 1977
- ILPS 9465 – not issued
- ILPS 9466 – not issued
- ILPS 9467 – not issued
- ILPS 9468 – not issued
- ILPS 9469 – not issued
- ILPS 9470 – Grace Jones: Portfolio, 1977
- ILPS 9471 – not issued
- ILPS 9472 – not issued
- ILPS 9473 – not issued
- ILPS 9474 – Roomful of Blues: Roomful of Blues, 1977
- ILPS 9475 – not issued
- ILPS 9476 – Robert Palmer: Double Fun, 1978
- ILPS 9477 – not issued
- ILPS 9478 – Brian Eno: Before And After Science, 1977
- ILPS 9479 – not issued
- ILPS 9480 – not issued
- ILPS 9481 – not issued
- ILPS 9482 – not issued
- ILPS 9483 – Uriah Heep: Firefly (Label: Bronze), 1977
- ILPS 9484 – John Martyn: So Far So Good, 1977
- ILPS 9485 – Rico: Man From Wareika, 1977
- ILPS 9486 – Michael Nesmith: From a Radio Engine to the Photon Wing (Label: Pacific Arts), 1977 (Catalogue number in North America was ILPA 9486)
- ILPS 9487 – Georgie Fame: Daylight, 1977
- ILPS 9488 – Paco De Lucia: Almoraima, 1977
- ILPS 9489 – Illusion: Out of the Mist, 1977
- ILPS 9490 – Rough Diamond: Rough Diamond, 1977
- ILPS 9491 – Reebop Kwaku Baah & Ganoua: Trance, 1977
- ILPS 9492 – John Martyn: One World, 1977
- ILPS 9493 – Sparks: The Best Of Sparks, 1977
- ILPS 9494 – Steve Winwood: Steve Winwood, 1977
- ILPS 9495 – not issued
- ILPS 9496 – Jess Roden: Blowin' (Live), 1977
- ILPS 9497 – Jim Capaldi: Play It by Ear, 1977
- ILPS 9498 – Bob Marley & The Wailers: Exodus, 1977
- ILPS 9499 – Junior Murvin: Police and Thieves, 1977

===== ILPS 95.. =====
- ILPS 9500 – Ian Gillan Band: Clear Air Turbulence, 1977; Collectable Records.ru
- ILPS 9501 – The Chieftains: Chieftains Live, 1977
- ILPS 9502 – Steel Pulse: Handsworth Revolution, 1977
- ILPS 9503 – Max Romeo: Reconstruction, 1978
- ILPS 9504 – George Faith: To Be A Lover (Label: Black Swan), 1976; Tapir's Reggae Discography
- ILPS 9505 – Ultravox!: Ha! Ha! Ha!, 1977
- ILPS 9506 – Jess Roden: The Player Not the Game, 1977
- ILPS 9507 – War: Platinum Jazz (2LP), 1977
- ILPS 9508 – Unknown
- ILPS 9509 – Eddie and the Hot Rods: Life on the Line, 1977
- ILPS 9510 – Klaus Schulze: Body Love (Soundtrack), 1977
- ILPS 9511 – Ian Gillan Band: Scarabus, 1977
- ILPS 9512 – Bunny Wailer: Protest, 1977
- ILPS 9513 – Burning Spear: Live, 1977
- ILPS 9514 – Unknown
- ILPS 9515 – Warsaw Pakt: Needle Time, 1977
- ILPS 9516 – Rico Rodriguez: Midnight In Ethiopia (never released)
- ILPS 9517 – Bob Marley & The Wailers: Kaya, 1978; Collectable Records.ru
- ILPS 9518 – Autograph: Automation. 1978
- ILPS 9519 – Illusion: Illusion, 1978
- ILPS 9520 – MX-80 Sound: Hard Attack, 1977
- ILPS 9521 – I Jah Man: Haile I Hym, 1978
- ILPS 9522 – Unknown
- ILPS 9523 – Wailing Souls: Wild Suspense, 1978
- ILPS 9524 – V.A.: Intensified! (1962–66), 1978
- ILPS 9525 – Grace Jones: Fame, 1978
- ILPS 9526 – Manu Dibango: Afrovision, 1978
- ILPS 9527 – Roundtree: Roller Disco, 1978
- ILPS 9528 – Bruce Cockburn: Further Adventures of Bruce Cockburn, 1978
- ILPS 9529 – MX-80 Sound: Hard Attack, 1977
- ILPS 9530 – V.A.: One Big Happy Family, 1978
- ILPS 9531 – Jess Roden: Stone Chaser, 1979
- ILPS 9532 – Justin Hinds & The Dominoes: Just In Time, 1979
- ILPS 9533 – Unknown
- ILPS 9534 – Toots & the Maytals: Pass the Pipe, 1979
- ILPS 9535 – Joe Higgs: Unity Is Power, 1979
- ILPS 9536 – Runner: Runner, 1979
- ILPS 9537 – Invisible Man's Band: Invisible Man's Band, 1979
- ILPS 9538 – Grace Jones: Muse, 1979
- ILPS 9539 – Manu Dibango: Gone Clear, 1980
- ILPS 9540 – American Standard Band: American Standard Band, 1979
- ILPS 9541 – Pablo Moses: A Song, 1980
- ILPS 9542 – Bob Marley & The Wailers: Survival, 1979
- ILPS 9543 – Unknown
- ILPS 9544 – Robert Palmer: Secrets, 1979
- ILPS 9545 – Ian Gillan: Live at the Budokan, 1980
- ILPS 9546 – Eddie Quinsah: Awo Awo, 1978 (Label: Mango)
- ILPS 9547 – Zap Pow: Zap Pow, 1980
- ILPS 9548 – Unknown
- ILPS 9549 – Unknown
- ILPS 9550 – Darryl Way: Concerto For Electric Violin, 1978
- ILPS 9551 – Roger McGough: Summer With Monica, 1978
- ILPS 9552 – Jade Warrior: Way of the Sun, 1978
- ILPS 9553 – Unknown
- ILPS 9554 – Third World: Journey To Addis, 1978
- ILPS 9555 – Ultravox: Systems of Romance, 1978
- ILPS 9556 – Burning Spear: Social Living,1978
- ILPS 9557 – I Jah Man: Are We a Warrior, 1979
- ILPS 9558 – Inner Circle: Everything Is Great, 1979
- ILPS 9559 – Charlie Dore: Where To Now, 1980
- ILPS 9560 – John Martyn: Grace & Danger, 1980
- ILPS 9561 – Unknown
- ILPS 9562 – Unknown
- ILPS 9563 – Eddie and the Hot Rods: Thriller, 1979
- ILPS 9564 – Hi-Tension: Hi-Tension, 1978
- ILPS 9565 – Cat Stevens: Back to Earth, 1978
- ILPS 9566 – Linton Kwesi Johnson: Forces of Victory, 1979
- ILPS 9567 – Burning Spear: Harder Than the Best, 1978
- ILPS 9568 – Steel Pulse: Tribute to the Martyrs, 1979
- ILPS 9569 – Third World: The Story's Been Told, 1979
- ILPS 9570 – Marianne Faithfull: Broken English, 1979
- ILPS 9571 – Not issued
- ILPS 9572 – Kim Fowley: Snake Document Masquerade, 1979
- ILPS 9573 – The Slits: Cut, 1979; Discogs
- ILPS 9574 – Third World: Arise In Harmony, 1980
- ILPS 9575 – Unknown
- ILPS 9576 – Steve Winwood: Arc of a Diver, 1980
- ILPS 9577 – In Crowd: Man From New Guinea, 1979
- ILPS 9578 – Unknown
- ILPS 9579 – Gibson Brothers: Cuba, 1979
- ILPS 9580 – The B-52's: The B-52's, 1979
- ILPS 9581 – Serge Gainsbourg: Aux Armes Et Cetera, 1979
- ILPS 9582 – Unknown
- ILPS 9583 – V.A.: Scratch on the Wire, 1979
- ILPS 9584 – Unknown
- ILPS 9585 – The Buggles: The Age of Plastic, 1980
- ILPS 9586 – Unknown
- ILPS 9587 – V.A.: Rockers (Soundtrack), 1979
- ILPS 9588 – Unknown
- ILPS 9589 – Unknown

==== HELP series ====
A series of budget-priced albums. Those on the Island label used a black variation of the "white i" label with a pink "i" logo and silver print. HELP albums on the Blue Thumb and Bronze labels used their respective designs.

- HELP 1 – Emerson, Lake & Palmer: Pictures at an Exhibition, 1971 (originally the catalogue number was assigned as ILPS 9177, the LP number of which was later given to and released as War: All Day Music, but the 8-track cartridge version of Pictures at an Exhibition was released as Y8I 9177)
- HELP 2 – Robin Williamson: Myrrh, 1972
- HELP 3 – Henry Wolff, Nancy Hennings With Drew Gladstone: Tibetan Bells, 1972
- HELP 4 – Colosseum: Valentyne Suite (Bronze label /UK, Island label /Germany, original on Vertigo)
- HELP 5 – Ashley Hutchings: Morris On, 1972
- HELP 6 – King Crimson: Earthbound (Live), 1972
- HELP 7 – Habibiyya: If Man But Knew, 1972
- HELP 8 – National Lampoon: Radio Dinner, 1972 (Label: Blue Thumb)
- HELP 9 – V.A.: The Dynamic Sound of Jamaica, Volume 1, 1973 (Label: Dragon)
- HELP 10 – John Surman: Westering Home, 1972
- HELP 11 – Grimms: Grimms, 1973
- HELP 12 – Stomu Yamashta & Come To The Edge: Floating Music, 1972
- HELP 13 – Sun Treader: Zin-Zin, 1973
- HELP 14 – Remi Kabaka, Abdul Lasisi Amao, Steve Winwood: Aiye-Keta (as 'The Third World'), 1973
- HELP 15 – V.A.: Soul of Jamaica, 1973
- HELP 16 – Fripp & Eno: No Pussyfooting, 1973
- HELP 17 – Ashley Hutchings: The Compleat Dancing Master, 1973
- HELP 18 – Basil Kirchin: Worlds Within Worlds (Parts 3 & 4), 1973
- HELP 19 – Quiet Sun: Mainstream, 1975; Collectable Records.ru
- HELP 20 – V.A. (Fania All Stars): Salsa!, 1974
- HELP 21 – Fania All Stars: Salsa Live, 1976
- HELP 22 – Fripp & Eno: Evening Star, 1976
- HELP 23 – Jorge Ben: Samba Nova, 1976
- HELP 24 – Ashley Hutchings: Rattlebone & Ploughjack, 1976
- HELP 25 – The Albion Country Band: Battle of the Field, 1976
- HELP 26 – James Booker: Junco Partner, 1976
- HELP 27 – Renaissance: Illusion, 1976; (original release: 1970)
- HELP 28 – Fairport Convention: Live at the L.A. Troubadour, 1976
- HELP 29 – Irma Thomas: Live, 1976

==== Special "artist related" editions ====
- IBDB 1 – Bob Dylan and The Band: Before The Flood (2LP), 1974
- NDSP 100 – Nick Drake: Fruit Tree (4-LP box set), 1979
- SDSP 100 – Sandy Denny: Who Knows Where the Time Goes? (4-LP box set), 1985

==== ICD series ====
The ICD series comprised the following double albums:

- ICD 1/2 – Colosseum: Colosseum Live (2LP; on Bronze label), 1971
- ICD 3/4 – Fairport Convention: The History of Fairport Convention (2LP), 1972
- ICD 5 – Dave Mason: Scrapbook (2LP), 1972
- ICD 6 – not issued
- ICD 7 – not issued
- ICD 8 – Richard Thompson: (guitar, vocal) (2LP), 1976
- ICD 9 – V.A.: New Orleans Jazz & Heritage Festival 1976 (2LP), 1976

==== IDP series ====
Two "sampler" LPs were issued using numbers in this series:

- IDP 1 – various artists: Bumpers (2LP), 1970
- IDLP 1 – various artists: El Pea (2LP), 1971

==== ISLD series ====
This was another series used for the following double albums:

- ISLD 1 – Uriah Heep: Uriah Heep Live (2LP; on Bronze label), 1973
- ISLD 2 – Traffic: On the Road (2LP), 1973 – disc numbers are ISLD 3.1 and ISLD 3.2, thereby conflicting with The Free Story LP number (see below); Collectable Records.ru
- ISLD 3 – Free: The Free Story (2LP), 1973 – ISLD 3 used on low numbered sleeves only; record labels have ISLD 4 due to conflict with On The Road disc numbers (see above)
- ISLD 4 – Free: The Free Story (2LP), 1973
- ISLD 5 – not issued
- ISLD 6 – Paul Horn: A Special Edition (2LP), 1973
- ISLD 7 – King Crimson: A Young Person's Guide to King Crimson (2LP), 1975 (Note: includes a previously unreleased Judy Dyble-vocal version of "I Talk To The Wind")
- ISLD 8 – War: War Live (2LP), 1973
- ISLD 9 – Incredible String Band: Seasons They Change (2LP), 1976
- ISLD 10 – Stomu Yamashta's Go: Go Live from Paris (2LP), 1976
- ISLD 11 – Bob Marley & The Wailers: Babylon By Bus (2LP), 1978

==== ISS series ====
- ISS 2 – Fairport Convention: Tour Sampler – promotional, limited to 500 copies.

== USA/Canada releases 1970s ==
=== LPs on the Island label (distributed by Capitol Records) ===
- SW-9178 – Mott the Hoople: Brain Capers, 1971 (Canada only)
- SMAS-9300 – Bronco: Country Home, 1970
- SMAS-9302 – Blondel: Evensong, 1970
- SMAS-9303 – White Noise: An Electric Storm, 1971 (UK release in 1969)
- SW-9304 – Reebop Kwaku Baah: Reebop, 1971
- SMAS-9305 – Habibiyya: If Man But Knew, 1971
- SW-9306 – Traffic: The Low Spark of High Heeled Boys, 1971
- SMAS-9307 – Nick Drake: Nick Drake, 1971 (compilation of tracks from his first two UK albums)
- SW-9308 – Alan Bown: Listen, 1971 (UK release in 1970)
- SMAS-9309 – Bronco: Ace of Sunlight, 1971
- SW-9310 – Blondel: Fantasia Lindum, 1971
- SMAS-9311 – John Martyn: Bless the Weather, 1971
- SMAS-9312 – Luther Grosvenor: Under Open Skies, 1971
- SMAS-9313 – Mike Harrison: Mike Harrison, 1971
- SW-9314 – Jim Capaldi: Oh How We Danced, 1972
- SW-9315 – Sutherland Brothers: Sutherland Brothers Band, 1972
- SW-9316 – Claire Hamill: One House Left Standing, 1972
- SMAS-9317 – Smith-Perkins-Smith: Smith-Perkins-Smith, 1972
- SMAS-9318 – Nick Drake: Pink Moon, 1972
- SMAS-9319 – Henry Wolff, Nancy Hennings With Drew Gladstone: Tibetan Bells, 1972
- SMAS-9320 – Kossoff, Kirke, Tetsu and Rabbit: Kossoff, Kirke, Tetsu and Rabbit, 1972
- SW-9321 – Mike Harrison: Smokestack Lightning, 1972
- SW-9322 – Patto: Roll 'Em, Smoke 'Em, Put Another Line Out, 1972
- SW-9323 – Traffic: Shoot Out at the Fantasy Factory, 1973
- SW-9324 – Free: Heartbreaker, 1973 (UK release in 1972)
- SW-9325 – John Martyn: Solid Air, 1973 (UK release in 1972)
- SW-9326 – Sutherland Brothers & Quiver: Lifeboat, 1973 (some tracks are the same versions as the UK Sutherland Brothers LP [ILPS 9212], some tracks are re-recordings with Quiver, and some are totally new tracks)
- SW-9327 – Blondel: England, 1973 (UK release in 1972)
- SMAS-9328 – Rabbit: Broken Arrows, 1972
- SW-9329 – The Wailers: Catch a Fire, 1973 (with the original flip-top "cigarette lighter" cover)
- SW-9331 – Claire Hamill: October, 1973
- SMAS-9333 – No Go! (original motion picture soundtrack), 1973
- SMAS-9334 – Stomu Yamashta's Red Buddha Theatre: The Original Music From the Play "The Man From The East", 1973
- SMAS-9335 – John Martyn: Inside Out, 1973
- SMAS-9336 – Traffic: On the Road, 1973 (a single disc version released in North America only)
- SW-9337 – Spooky Tooth: Witness, 1973
- SMAS-9338 – The Wailers: Burnin', 1973
- SMAS-9339 – Blondel: Blondel, 1973
- SW-9340 – Sandy Denny: Like an Old Fashioned Waltz, 1974
- SW-9341 – Sutherland Brothers & Quiver: Dream Kid, 1974, (UK release in 1973)
- SW-9343 – Jimmy Cliff: Struggling Man, 1974

=== LPs on the Antilles label ===
- AX-7000 – V.A.: The Greater Antilles Sampler, 1976
- AN-7001 – Fripp & Eno: No Pussyfooting (reissue), 1976
- AN-7002 – The Portsmouth Sinfonia (Conductor: John Farley): Hallelujah (At The Royal Albert Hall), 1976
- AN-7003 – Ashley Hutchings & John Kirkpatrick: The Compleat Dancing Master, 1976
- AN-7004 – Morning Glory Featuring John Surman: Morning Glory, 1976
- AN-7005 – Remi Kabaka, Abdul Lasisi Amao, Steve Winwood: Aiye-Keta (reissue), 1976
- AN-7006 – Henry Wolff, Nancy Hennings With Drew Gladstone: Tibetan Bells (reissue), 1976
- AN-7007 – Jimmy Reed: Cold Chills (reissue), 1975
- AN-7008 – Quiet Sun: Mainstream, 1975
- AN-7009 – Hugh Delain: Harry Warren's Piano Vignettes, 1976
- AN-7010 – Nick Drake: Five Leaves Left (reissue), 1976
- AN-7011 – White Noise: An Electric Storm (reissue), 1976
- AN-7012 – Grimms: Rockin' Duck (reissue), 1976
- AN-7013 – Willie Mabon: Sings "I Don't Know" and Other Chicago Blues Hits (reissue), 1976
- AN-7014 – Country Gazette: Country Gazette Live, 1976
- AN-7015 – Sousa / Antonin Kubalek: Other Sides of Sousa, 1976
- AN-7016 – Osamu Kitajima: Benzaiten, 1976
- AN-7017 – Shirley Collins and the Albion Country Band: No Roses, 1976
- AN-7018 – Fripp & Eno: Evening Star (reissue), 1976
- AN-7020 – The Watersons: For Pence and Spicy Ale, 1976
- AN-7021 – Frankie Armstrong: Songs and Ballads, 1976
- AN-7022 – Mississippi Fred McDowell: Somebody Keeps Callin' Me (reissue), 1976
- AN-7023 – Tim Hardin: Nine, 1976
- AN-7024 – Earl Hooker: Funk – Last of the Great Earl Hooker Featuring Jeff Karp (reissue), 1976
- AN-7025 – Detroit Jr.: Chicago Urban Blues (reissue), 1976
- AN-7026 – Allen Fontenot & The Country Cajuns: Cajun Music, 1977
- AN-7027 – Albion Country Band: Battle of the Field, 1976
- AN-7028 – Nick Drake: Bryter Layter (reissue), 1976
- AN-7029 – Gay & Terry Woods: The Time Is Right, 1976
- AN-7030 – Brian Eno: Discreet Music, 1975
- AN-7031 – Jan Steele & John Cage: Voices and Instruments, 1976
- AN-7032 – Assalam Aleikoum Africa, Volume 1 (Progressive and Popular Music of West Africa), 1976
- AN-7033 – Assalam Aleikoum Africa, Volume 2 (Traditional and Modern Folk Music of West Africa), 1976
- AN-7034 – Don Cherry: Eternal Now (reissue), 1976
- AN-7035 – Johnny Dyani, Okay Temiz, Mongezi Feza: Music For Xaba (reissue), 1976
- AN-7039 – The City Waites: A Gorgeous Gallery of Gallant Inventions, 1977
- AN-7040 – Gary Shearston: Dingo, 1977
- AN-7041 – Martin Carthy & Dave Swarbrick: Selections, 1976
- AN-7042 – Tom Newman: Fine Old Tom, 1977
- AN-7043 – June Tabor: Airs and Graces, 1977
- AN-7044 – Sparks: Kimono My House (reissue), 1977
- AN-7045 – Jade Warrior: Floating World (reissue), 1977
- AN-7046 – Spooky Tooth: The Mirror (reissue), 1977
- AN-7047 – Peter Cook & Dudley Moore: Good Evening, 1977
- AN-7048 – Jade Warrior: Waves (reissue), 1977
- AN-7052 – The Wild Tchoupitoulas: The Wild Tchoupitoulas (reissue), 1978
- AN-7053 – Jorge Ben: Samba Nova (reissue), 1978
- AN-7054 – Fairport Featuring Dave Swarbrick: Gottle O'Geer, 1978
- AN-7055 – Jorge Ben: Tropical (reissue), 1978
- AN-7056 – Jade Warrior: Kites (reissue), 1978
- AN-7057 – Automatic Man: Automatic Man (reissue), 1978
- AN-7058 – Osibisa: Ojah Awake (reissue), 1978
- AN-7061 – Osamu Kitajima: Osamu, 1978
- AN-7062 – Automatic Man: Visitors (reissue), 1978
- AN-7063 – John Cale: Guts, 1978
- AN-7065 – Klaus Schulze: Body Love – Additions To The Original Soundtrack, 1978
- AN-7066 – Ian Gillan Band: Scarabus (reissue), 1978
- AN-7067 – V.A.: No New York, 1978
- AN-7068 – Jade Warrior: Way of the Sun, 1978
- AN-7069 – Ultravox: Systems of Romance, 1978
- AN-7070 – Brian Eno: Music For Films, 1978
- AN-7071 – Roomful of Blues: Let's Have A Party, 1979
- AN-7072 – The Rivits: Multiplay, 1980
- AN-7075 – Kim Fowley: Snake Document Masquerade, 1979
- AN-7076 – Blackfoot: No Reservations (reissue), 1979
- AN-7077 – The Slits: Cut, 1979
- AN-7078 – Kid Creole & The Coconuts: Off the Coast of Me, 1980
- AN-7079 – Ultravox: Three Into One compilation, 1980
- AN-7080 – Suicide: Suicide (Alan Vega, Martin Rev), 1980
- AN-7081 – John Martyn: Grace & Danger, 1980
- AN-7082 – Basement 5: 1965–1980, 1981
- AN-7083 – V.A.: Hicks From The Sticks, 1980
- AN-7084 – V.A.: The Uproar Tapes, Volume 1, 1986
- AN-7085 – The Africans: Original Soundtrack Album From The Television Series, 1986
- AN-7086 – Bert Seager Jazz Quintet: Time To Burn, 1986
- AN-7087 – The Big Easy (original motion picture soundtrack), 1987
- AN-7088 – Bert Seager Jazz Quintet: Because They Can, 1988

== UK releases 1980s ==
=== Singles of the 1980s ===
==== WIP series ====
For singles released during the years 1980 to 1983, which were numbered in this series, see Singles of the 1970s section, above.

==== IS series ====
This new series of numbers was introduced in 1983 to replace the long-running WIP series for 7" singles (and other formats). As the CD format gained ascendancy during the later 1980s, so more and more singles were released with the prefix CID, indicating a CD release, initially alongside the "standard" 7" release.

- IS 101 – David Joseph: "You Can't Hide (Your Love From me)"; 12": 12IS 101
- IS 102 – The Powell Family: "No Problem" / "Dub Cut", 1983; 12": 12IS 102
- IS 104 – Robert Palmer: "You Are In My System", 1983; 12": 12IS 104
- IS 105 – Marianne Faithfull: "Running for Our Lives", 1983
- IS 106 – Gwen Guthrie: "Hopscotch" / "You're The One", 1983; 12": 12IS 106, 12" Promo: 12IS 106
- IS 107 – The B-52's: "Future Generation", 1983; 12": Island 12IS 107
- IS 108 – Bob Marley: "Buffalo Soldier" / "Buffalo Dub", 1983; 12": Tuff Gong 12IS 108
- IS 109 – U2: "Two Hearts Beat as One", 1983 12": 12IS 109
- IS 110 – Set The Tone: "Rap Your Love" (12": 12IS 110), 1983
- IS 111 – Paul Haig: Heaven Sent (12": 12IS 111), Label: Les Disques du Crepuscule, 1983
- IS 112 – Marcia Griffiths: "Electric Boogie" / "Electric Boogie (Long Version)" b/w "Electric Boogie (Dub 1)" / "Electric Boogie (Dub 2)" / "Electric Boogie (Dub 3)" (12": Island 12IS 112), 1983
- IS 113 – John Cale: "I Keep a Close Watch", 1983
- IS 114 – Le Slow Starring Sophy Cherie: "Tonight I'm in the Mood for Love", Label: ZE, 1983
- IS 115 – Joe Cocker: "Threw it Away", 1983
- IS 116 – David Joseph: Let's Live It Up (12": 12IS116), 1983
- IS 117 – Tom Tom Club: "The Man With The 4 Way Hips" (12": 12IS 117), 1983
- IS 118 – not issued
- IS 119 – Peech Boys: "On A Journey" (12": 12IS 119), 1983
- IS 120 – Big Brother: "Adventures In Success, Part 1" / "Part 2" (12": 12IS 120), 1983
- IS 121 – Robert Palmer: "You Can Have It (Take My Heart)" (12": 12IS 121), 1983
- IS 122 – King Sunny Ade & His African Beats: "Synchro System" (12": 12IS 122), 1983
- IS 123 – Cat Stevens: "Morning Has Broken" / "Moon Shadow", 1983
- IS 124 – Paul Haig: "Never Give Up (Party, Party)" (12": 12IS 124), 1983
- IS 125 – Martha: "Light Years from Love", 1983
- IS 126 – Antena: "Be Pop"; 12": 12IS 126, 1983
- IS 127 – Louise Bennett: "Long Time Gal", 1983
- IS 128 – David Joseph: "Be a Star", 1983
- IS 129 – Toots Hibbert: "Spiritual Healing" / "Spiritual Healing (Instrumental)" b/w "Spiritual Healing (Long version)" (12": 12IS 129), 1983
- IS 130 – Kid Creole & The Coconuts: "There's Something Wrong In Paradise" (12": 12IS 130), 1983
- IS 132 – Club House: "Do It Again" / "Billy Jean" (12": 12IS 132), 1983
- IS 133 – Black Uhuru: "Party Next Door" / "Party In Session" (12": 12IS 133), 1983
- IS 134 – Will Powers: "Kissing with Confidence", 1983
- IS 135 – Time Zone: "The Wildstyle" (12": 12IS 135), Label: Celluloid, 1983
- IS 136 – not issued
- IS 137 – not issued
- IS 138 – Paul Haig: "Justice" (12": 12IS 138), Label: Les Disques du Crépuscule, 1983
- IS 139 – Ruichi Sakamoto: "Riot In Lagos" (12": 12IS 139), 1980
- IS 140 – not issued
- IS 141 – Tom Waits: "In the Neighborhood", 1983
- IS 142 – Kid Creole & The Coconuts: "The Lifeboat Party", Label: ZE, 1983
- IS 143 – Tomboy: "Why" / "Y-Dub", 1983
- IS 144 – not issued
- IS 145 – Will Powers: "Smile" (12": 12IS 145), 1983
- IS 146 – Grandmixer D.ST.: "Crazy Cuts" (12": 12IS 146), 1983
- IS 147 – Club House: "Superstition" / "Good Times" (12": 12IS147), 1983
- IS 148 – L.C.G.C.: "Fill My Cup", 1983
- IS 149 – not issued
- IS 150 – Black Uhuru: "What Is Life?" b/w "Solidarity" / "Party Next Door" (12": 12IS 150), 1983
- IS 151 – not issued
- IS 152 – Aswad: "African Children", 1983
- IS 153 – David Joseph: "Joys of Life", 1984
- IS 154 – Gregory Isaacs: "Love Me With Feeling", 1983
- IS 155 – John Williams: "Paul McCartney's Theme from The Honorary Consul", 1983
- IS 156 – Will Powers: "Adventures In Success" (12": 12IS 156), 1983
- IS 157 – John Cale: "Caribbean Island", Label: ZE, 1984
- IS 158 – Mel Brooks: "To Be Or Not To Be (The Hitler Rap)" (12": IVA 12IS 158), Label: Island Visual Arts, 1983
- IS 159 – Not issued
- IS 160 – Aswad: "Chasing For The Breeze" / "Gave You My Love" (12": Island 12IS 160), 1984.
- IS 160 – Aswad: "Chasing For The Breeze" / "Gave You My Love" and "Dub Chase" / "Have This Dub" (2x12": Island 12ISX 160), 1984
- IS 161 – The Philharmonia Orchestra: "Champions Theme" b/w "Grand National", Label: Island Visual Arts, 1984
- IS 162 – Alexei Sayle: "'Ullo John! Gotta New Motor?" (12": 12IS 162), 1983
- IS 163 – Not issued
- IS 164 – Mon Dino: "La Danse Des Mots" (12": Disques Zou-A-Ves 12IS 164), 1983
- IS 165 – Keith LeBlanc: "Malcolm X: No Sell Out" (12": Tommy Boy 12IS 165), 1983
- IS 166 – Not issued
- IS 167 – The Earons: "Land of Hunger" (12": 12IS 167), 1984
- IS 168 – Daisy Chain: "No Time to Stop Believing in Love", Label: ZE, 1983
- IS 169 – Bob Marley & The Wailers: "One Love" / "People Get Ready (Extended Version)" (12": Island 12IS 169), 1984.
- IS 169 – Bob Marley & The Wailers: "One Love" / "People Get Ready (Extended Version)" and "So Much Trouble In The World" / "Keep On Moving" (2x12": Island 12ISX 169), 1984
- IS 170 – Aswad: "54 46 (Was My Number)" / "54 46 (Was My Number) – Horns Revival" b/w "Java" / "Warrior Charge (Trouble Mix)" (12": Island 12IS 170), 1984
- IS 171 – Junie Morrison: "Techno-Freqs; 12": ZE /Island 12IS 171
- IS 172 – White China: "Real World", 1984
- IS 173 – not issued
- IS 174 – Elaine Paige: "Sometimes", Label: Island Visual Arts, 1983
- IS 175 – Mikael Rickfors: "Blue Fun", 1984
- IS 176 – Papa Levi: "Bonnie & Clyde" / "Warning" (12": Island 12IS 176), 1984
- IS 177 – not issued
- IS 178 – Breakfast Club: "Rico Mambo"; 12": Island 12IS 178
- IS 179 – not issued
- IS 180 – Bob Marley & The Wailers: "Waiting in Vain" / "Blackman Redemption" b/w "Marley Mix Up: Exodus/Positive Vibration/Pimpers Paradise/Punky Reggae Party" (12": Island 12IS 180), 1984
- IS 181 – King Sunny Ade: "Ase"; 12": Island 12IS 181
- IS 182 – Amazulu: "Moonlight Romance", 1984
- IS 183 – not issued
- IS 184 – not issued
- IS 185 – not issued
- IS 186 – not issued
- IS 187 – Beastmaster: "Lipservice", Label: Tommy Boy, 1983
- IS 188 – West Indian Touring Team: "West Indians Are Back In Town" / "Skipper Lloyd" (12": Island 12IS 188), 1984
- IS 189 – Rouen: "Ordinary Life" b/w "Run With You", 1985
- IS 190 – Kid Creole & The Coconuts: "Don't Take My Coconuts" b/w "Going Places", 1984
- IS 191 – Pearl Harbour: "Hula Love"; 10": Island 10IS 191 /UK, 1984
- IS 192 – Blue in Heaven: "Julia Cries" b/w "The Message", 1984
- IS 193 – Animal Nightlife: "Mr. Solitaire"; 12": 12IS 193
- IS 194 – Special Request: "Take It To The Max"; 12": 12IS 194
- IS 195 – Force M.D.'s: "Tears", Label: Tommy Boy, 1985
- IS 196 – Dean Fraser: "Redemption Song" / "Harmour Love" (12": Island 12IS 196), 1984
- IS 197 – John Cale: "Ooh La La", Label: ZE, 1984
- IS 198 – Paul Haig: "The Only Truth"; 12": 12IS 198
- IS 199 – Blue in Heaven: "Across My Heart", 1984
- IS 200 – Animal Nightlife: "Love Is Just the Great Pretender"; 12": 12IS 200
- IS 201 – Amazulu: "Excitable", 1985
- IS 202 – U2: "Pride (In the Name of Love)" (12": Island 12IS 202), 1984
- IS 203 – not issued
- IS 204 – not issued
- IS 205 – White China: "Smiles and Jokes" b/w "Seen from Above", 1985
- IS 206 – Grace Jones: "Slave To The Rhythm"; 12": 12IS 206
- IS 207 – Force MC's: "Forgive Me Girl" / "Itchin' For A Scratch"; 12": Island 12IS 208
- IS 208 – Papa Levi: "Big 'n' Broad" / "'84 'tion"; 12": Island 12IS 208, 1984
- IS 209 – John Martyn: "Over The Rainbow" b/w "Rope Soul'd", 1984
- IS 210 – Bob Marley & The Wailers: "Could You Be Loved" / "Jamming" b/w "No Woman No Cry" / "Coming From The Cold" (12": Island 12IS 210), 1984
- IS 211 – In Tua Nua: "Take My Hand" b/w "Fire in My Heart", 1984
- IS 212 – not issued
- IS 213 – not issued
- IS 214 – Aswad: "Need Your Love (Each And Every Day)" / "Rainfall, Sunshine"; 12": Island 12IS 214, 1984
- IS 215 – 3-D: "Greatest Beat Megamix"; 12": Island 12IS 215
- IS 216 – Dumb Guys: "Rap-O-Matic Rap"; 12": Island 12IS 216
- IS 217 – Rupert Hine: "Picture Phone", 1983
- IS 218 – Martin Ansell: "The Eighth Wonder" b/w "Infidel (For Chrissie)", 1985
- IS 219 – Third World: "Now That We've Found Love"; also released on 7": Island ISX 219 (with a remixed version by Paul Hardcastle), 12": Island 12IS 219, 12": Mango 12ISX 219, all UK, 1985
- IS 220 – U2: "The Unforgettable Fire" (12": Island 12IS 220), 1985
- IS 221 – Free: "Wishing Well", 1985
- IS 222 – Globe & Pow Wow: "Celebrate! (Everybody)"; 12": Island 12IS 222
- IS 223 – In Tua Nua: "Somebody to Love", 1985
- IS 224 – Rita Marley: "Good Girls Culture", label: Mango, 1985
- IS 225 – Trevor Jones: "Theme from The Last Place on Earth", Label: Island Visual Arts, 1985
- IS 226 – not issued
- IS 227 – not issued
- IS 228 – Jah Wobble & Ollie Marland: "Love Mystery"; 12": island 12IS 228
- IS 229 – G.L.O.B.E. & Whiz Kid: "He's Got The Beat"; 12": 12IS 229
- IS 230 – not issued
- IS 231 – not issued
- IS 232 – not issued
- IS 233 – Amazulu: "Don't You Just Know It"
- IS 234 – Michael Winslow: "I Am My Own Walkman", 1985
- IS 235 – Roy Orbison: "Wild Hearts (Run Out of Time)", 1985 (Italian issue)
- IS 236 – Bob Marley and the Wailers: "Three Little Birds", 1985
- IS 237 – The Long Ryders: "Looking for Lewis and Clark", 1985
- IS 238 – Sly and Robbie: "Get To This, Get To That"; 12": Island 12IS238
- IS 239 – Ini Kamoze: "Call the Police" b/w Taxi Gang: "Maxi Taxi", Label: Mango, 1985
- IS 240 – Grace Jones: "Pull Up To The Bumper" (Remix); 12": Island 12IS 240
- IS 241 – not issued
- IS 242 – Robert Palmer: "Discipline of Love", 1986
- IS 243 – not issued
- IS 244 – The Taxi Gang Featuring Bernard Fowler: "Down on the Corner", 1985
- IS 245 – Animal Nightlife: "Preacher, Preacher", 1985
- IS 246 – not issued
- IS 247 – not issued
- IS 248 – Baby Go Boom: "Life (Can Be a Hurtful Thing)", 1985
- IS 249 – not issued
- IS 250 – not issued
- IS 251 – Sly & Robbie: "Make 'Em Move", 1985
- IS 252 – not issued
- IS 253 – Tom Waits: "Downtown Train", 1985
- IS 254 – In Tua Nua: "Blue Eyes Again", 1985
- IS 255 – not issued
- IS 256 – Robert Palmer: "Riptide", 1985
- IS 257 – P.P. Arnold: "Supergrass", 1985
- IS 258 – not issued
- IS 259 – not issued
- IS 260 – Tom Waits: "In the Neighborhood", 1985
- IS 261 – not issued
- IS 262 – not issued
- IS 263 – The Prime Movers: "On the Trail", 1985
- IS 264 – Trevor Notch: "Bip Bip Bip Bip Bop Bop Bop" b/w "Just Cool", Label: Mango, 1985
- IS 265 – John Martyn: "Angeline" b/w "Tight Connection to My Heart", 1986
- CID 265 – John Martyn: Classic John Martyn ("Angeline" / "Tight Connection To My Heart" / "May You Never" / "Solid Air" / "Glistening Glyndebourne"), 1986
- IS 266 – Grace Jones: "Love is the Drug (Remix)", 1986
- IS 267 – Amazulu: "The Things The Lonely Do", 1986
- IS 268 – not issued
- IS 269 – Force M.D.'s: "Tender Love", Label: Tommy Boy, 1986
- IS 270 – Robert Palmer: "Addicted to Love", 1986
- IS 271 – The Prime Movers: "Dark Western Night" b/w "Lost in Your World", 1986
- IS 272 – John Martyn: "Lonely Love"
- IS 273 – Grace Jones: "Private Life", 1986
- IS 274 – not issued
- IS 275 – not issued
- IS 276 – not issued
- IS 277 – not issued
- IS 278 – not issued
- IS 279 – not issued
- IS 280 – not issued
- IS 281 – Dead Dog Ltd: "Devious Woman", 1986
- IS 282 – not issued
- IS 283 – Robert Palmer: "I Didn't Mean to Turn You On", 1986
- IS 284 – Amazulu: "Too Good to Be Forgotten", 1986
- IS 285 – not issued
- IS 286 – Force M.D.'s: "Here I Go Again", Label: Tommy Boy, 1986
- IS 287 – not issued
- IS 288 – Steve Winwood: "Higher Love" b/w "And I Go", 1986; 12": Island 12IS 288
- IS 289 – Ini Kamoze: "Pirate", 1986
- IS 290 – Julian Cope: "World Shut Your Mouth", 1986
- IS 291 – The Christians: "Forgotten Town", 1987
- IS 292 – T.T. Quick: "Glad All Over", 1986
- IS 293 – Amazulu: "Montego Bay", 1986
- IS 294 – Steve Winwood: "Freedom Overspill", 1986
- IS 295 – not issued
- IS 296 – not issued
- IS 297 – not issued
- IS 298 – not issued
- IS 299 – not issued
- IS 300 – not issued
- IS 301 – Courtney Pine (featuring the vocal of Susaye Greene): "Children of the Ghetto", 1986
- IS 302 – not issued
- IS 303 – Steve Winwood: "Back in the High Life Again", 1987
- IS 304 – not issued
- IS 305 – Julian Cope: "Trampolene", 1987
- IS 306 – not issued
- IS 307 – not issued
- IS 308 – not issued
- IS 309 – not issued
- IS 310 – Amazulu: "All Over the World", 1986
- IS 311 – not issued
- IS 312 – The Comsat Angels: "The Cutting Edge", 1986
- IS 313 – not issued
- IS 314 – Shriekback: "Gunning for the Buddha", 1986
- IS 315 – not issued
- IS 316 – Anthrax: "I Am the Law", 1986
- IS 317 – not issued
- IS 318 – Julian Cope: "Eve's Volcano", 1987
- CID 318 – Julian Cope: "Eve's Volcano (Covered In Sin)" / "Almost Beautiful Child (I & II)" / "Pulsar N.X. (live)" / "Shot Down (live)", 1987
- IS 319 – U2: "With or Without You", 1987
- IS 320 – not issued
- IS 321 – not issued
- IS 322 – not issued
- IS 323 – Marianne Faithfull: "As Tears Go By", 1987
- IS 324 – Fairport Convention: "Meet on the Ledge", 1987
- IS 325 – Anthrax: "Indians", 1987
- IS 326 – The Christians: "Hooverville (And They Promised Us the World)", 1987
- IS 327 – not issued
- IS 328 – U2: "I Still Haven't Found What I'm Looking For", 1987
- IS 329 – Viola Wills: "Reggae High", Label: Mango, 1987
- IS 330 – The Long Ryders: "I Want You Bad", 1987
- IS 331 – Buckwheat Zydeco: "Marie, Marie", 1987
- IS 332 – not issued
- IS 333 – not issued
- IS 334 – Tonto Irie: "New York Life", Label: Mango, 1987
- IS 335 – not issued
- IS 336 – Steve Winwood: "Valerie" b/w "Talking Back To The Night", 1987
- IS 337 – The Triffids: "Bury Me Deep in Love", 1987
- IS 338 – Anthrax: "I'm the Man", 1987
- IS 339 – The Bedrock Gang: "The Flintstones Rock", Label: Mango, 1987
- IS 340 – U2: "Where the Streets Have No Name", 1987
- IS 341 – Aswad: "Don't Turn Around", Label: Mango, 1988
- IS 342 – Andrew Cash: "Smile Me Down", 1988
- IS 343 – Shriekback: "Get Down Tonight", 1988
- IS 344 – Eddie Stockley: "I Will Always Love You", Label: Mango Street, 1988
- IS 345 – not issued
- IS 346 – Count Prince Miller: "Mule Train", Label: Mango, 1987
- IS 347 – The Christians: "Ideal World", 1987
- IS 348 – not issued
- IS 349 – not issued
- IS 350 – The Triffids: "A Trick of the Light", 1988
- IS 351 – not issued
- IS 352 – Robert Palmer: "Sweet Lies", 1988
- IS 353 – Bourgeois Tagg: "I Don't Mind At All" b/w "Pencil and Paper", 1987
- IS 354 – not issued
- IS 355 – MC Smart: "Chargin' Warrior" (12": 12IS 355, Mango label), 1988
- IS 356 – Melissa Etheridge: "Similar Features" b/w "I Want You", 1988
- IS 357 – not issued
- IS 358 – Aswad: "Give a Little Love", 1988
- IS 359 – not issued
- IS 360 – Bourgeois Tagg: "Waiting for the World to Turn", 1988
- IS 361 – Marcia Griffiths: "Fever", Label: Mango, 1988
- IS 362 – Traffic: "Hole in My Shoe", 1988
- IS 363 – not issued
- IS 364 – not issued
- IS 365 – The Christians: "Born Again", 1988
- IS 366 – not issued
- IS 367 – The Triffids: "Holy Water", 1988
- IS 368 – not issued
- IS 369 – Arrow: "Groove Master", Label: Mango, 1988
- IS 370 – Tom Waits: "16 Shells from a 30.6", 1988
- IS 371 – not issued
- IS 372 – Overlord X: "The Earth is Moving", 1988
- IS 373 – not issued
- IS 374 – not issued
- IS 375 – not issued
- IS 376 – Melissa Etheridge: "Don't You Need", 1988
- IS 377 – not issued
- CID 378 – Reggae Philharmonic Orchestra: "Minnie the Moocher" (7" version, 12" version) / "Dangling (Instrumental)"
- IS 379 – Anthrax: "Make Me Laugh", 1988
- IS 380 – Julian Cope: "Charlotte Anne", 1988
- IS 381 – Salif Keita: "Wamba", 1988
- IS 382 – Kotch: "Ooo Baby Baby", Label: Mango, 1988
- IS 383 – Aswad: "Set Them Free", Label: Mango, 1988
- IS 384 – not issued
- IS 385 – Jevetta Steele: "Calling You", 1988
- IS 386 – Buckwheat Zydeco: "Why Does Love Got to Be So Sad", 1988
- IS 387 – Overlord X: "2 Bad" (12": 12IS 387, Mango label), 1988
- IS 388 – Masters of Ceremony: "Redder Posse", 1988
- IS 389 – not issued
- IS 390 – not issued
- IS 391 – Jim Capaldi: "Some Come Running", 1988
- IS 392 – 54–46: "Ooo La La La", Label: Mango, 1988
- IS 393 – Melissa Etheridge: "Bring Me Some Water", 1988
- IS 394 – Balcony Dogs: "Balcony Dogs", Label: Bloodline, 1988
- IS 395 – The Christians: "Harvest for the World", 1988
- IS 396 – Jordan Bailey: "Don't Worry Be Happy", Label: Mango, 1988
- IS 397 – not issued
- IS 398 – not issued
- IS 399 – Julian Cope: "5 O'Clock World" (10": 10IS 399 /UK)
- IS 400 – U2: "Desire" b/w "Hallelujah Here She Comes", 1988
- IS 401 – Balcony Dogs: "Wheels of Fortune", not issued
- IS 402 – U2: "Angel of Harlem" b/w "A Room at the Heartbreak Hotel", 1988
- IS 403 – Kotch: "Tears", Label: Mango, 1988
- IS 404 – The Kevin McDermott Orchestra: "Wheels of Wonder" b/w "Independence Day", 1989
- IS 405 – not issued
- CID 406 – Julian Cope: "China Doll" / "Crazy Farm Animal" / "Rail On" / "Desi", 1989
- IS 407 – Freshski Dames: "Kicking It Live" (12": 12IS 407, Mango Street label), 1989
- CID 408 – Gavin Friday and The Man Seezer: "Each Man Kills the Thing He Loves"
- IS 409 – Anthrax: "Anti-Social", 1989
- IS 410 – David McComb and Adam Peters: "I Don't Need You", 1989
- IS 411 – U2 with B.B. King: "When Love Comes To Town" b/w U2: "Dancing Barefoot", 1989
- CID 411 – U2 with B.B. King: "When Love Comes To Town" / U2: "Dancing Barefoot" / U2 with B.B. King: "When Love Comes To Town (Live From the Kingdom Mix)" / U2: "God Part II (The Hard Metal Dance Mix)", 1989
- IS 412 – Buckwheat Zydeco: "Make a Change", 1989
- IS 413 – The Triffids: "Falling Over You", not issued
- IS 414 – not issued
- IS 415 – Overlord X: "Radical Kickbag" (12": 12IS 415, Mango label), 1989
- IS 416 – Leatherwolf: "Hideaway", 1989
- IS 417 – Claytown Troupe: "Prayer", 1989
- IS 418 – Etta James: "I Got the Will", 1989
- IS 419 – Jim Capaldi: "Take Me Home", 1989
- IS 420 – The Triffids: "Goodbye Little Boy", 1989
- IS 421 – not issued
- IS 422 – U2: "All I Want is You", 1989
- IS 423 – The Kevin McDermott Orchestra: "Where We Were Meant to Be", 1989
- IS 424 – The Triffids: "Bury Me Deep in Love", 1989
- IS 425 – Misty D: "Out on a Limb", Label: Mango Street, 1989
- IS 426 – And Why Not?: "Restless Days (She Screams Out Loud)" b/w "Hey Na Na (Make it Good)", 1989
- IS 427 – Roger Christian: "Take it From Me", 1989
- IS 428 – Claytown Troupe: "Hey Lord", 1989
- IS 429 – not issued
- IS 430 – Gavin Friday and The Man Seezer: "You Take Away the Sun" b/w The Next Thing To Murder", 1989
- CID 430 – Gavin Friday and The Man Seezer: "You Take Away the Sun (7" Version)" / The Next Thing To Murder" / "Love Is Just a Word" / "You Take Away the Sun (12" Version)"
- IS 431 – Melissa Etheridge: "No Souvenirs", 1989
- IS 432 – Vain: "Beat the Bullet", 1989
- IS 433 – Theophilus P. Wildebeeste and Dee Dee Wilde: "Don't Even Think About It", 1989
- IS 434 – Bandera: "Cruisin' Down Collins", 1989
- IS 435 – Dino: "I Like It", 1989
- IS 436 – not issued
- IS 437 – Kevin McDermott Orchestra: "Healing at the Harbour", 1989
- IS 438 – Robert Palmer: "Bad Case of Lovin' You", 1989
- IS 439 – Andrew Cash: "Boomtown", 1989
- IS 440 – Melissa Etheridge: "The Angels", 1989
- IS 441 – not issued
- IS 442 – Roger Christian: "Worlds Apart", 1989
- IS 443 – Hinterland: "Dark Hill", 1989
- IS 444 – See "Singles of the 1990s"
- IS 445 – not issued
- IS 446 – See "Singles of the 1990s"
- IS 447 – London Posse: "Live Like The Other Half Do" (12": 12IS 447, Mango label), 1989

=== LPs of the 1980s ===
==== ILPS series (1979–1991) ====
During this period Island regained some more important artists on its roster and continued to release 20 to 50 albums a year. The catalogue numbers don't follow the release dates as the numbers were given to projects scheduled for release. Usually the "Day & Night" label was in use for albums. Some new labels entered the Island distribution and were given Island catalogue numbers received for UK release while retaining their original labels (e.g. ZE, Celluloid).

- ILPS 9590 – Toots & the Maytals : Just Like That (1980)
- ILPS 9591 – Sugar Minott : Black Roots (1979)
- ILPS 9592 – Grace Jones : Warm Leatherette (1980)
- ILPS 9593 – Black Uhuru : Sinsemilla (1980)
- ILPS 9594 – Strand : Strand (1980)
- ILPS 9595 – Robert Palmer : Clues (1980)
- ILPS 9596 – Bob Marley & The Wailers : Uprising (1980) Collectable Records.ru
- ILPS 9597 – V.A. : More Original Ska: 1963–1967 (1980)
- ILPS 9598 – V.A. : Club Ska '67 (1980)
- ILPS 9599 – Aswad : Live & Direct (1983)
- ILPS 9600 – not issued
- ILPS 9601 – V.A. : The Secret Policemen's Ball (1980)
- ILPS 9602 – Utopia : Adventures in Utopia (1979)
- ILPS 9603 – The Jags : Evening Standards (1980)
- ILPS 9604 – The Distractions : Nobody's Perfect (1980)
- ILPS 9605 – Linton Kwesi Johnson : Bass Culture (1980)
- ILPS 9606 – Michael Prophet : Serious Reasoning (1980)
- ILPS 9607 – Roger Powell : Air Pocket (1980)
- ILPS 9608 – Inner Circle : New Age Music (1980)
- ILPS 9609 – not issued
- ILPS 9610 – not issued
- ILPS 9611 – Aswad : Hulet (1979)
- ILPS 9612 – not issued
- ILPS 9613 – Steel Pulse : Caught You (1980)
- ILPS 9614 – Ultravox : Three Into One (1979)
- ILPS 9615 – Vivian Jackson (aka Yabba U) : Jah Jah Way (1980)
- ILPS 9616 – Third World : Prisoner In The Street (1980)
- ILPS 9617 – Rivits : Multiplay (1980)
- ILPS 9618 – Randy Vanwarmer : Terraform (1980)
- ILPS 9619 – Tony Tuff (aka Winston Morris): Tony Tuff (1980)
- ILPS 9620 – Gibson Brothers : On The Riviera (1980)
- ILPS 9621 – not issued
- ILPS 9622 – The B-52's : Wild Planet (1980)
- ILPS 9623 – Jacob "Killer" Miller : Mixed Up Moods (1980)
- ILPS 9624 – Grace Jones : Nightclubbing (1981)
- ILPS 9625 – Black Uhuru : Red (1981)
- ILPS 9626 – Rockats : Live At The Ritz (1981)
- ILPS 9627 – Plastics : Welcome Back (1981)
- ILPS 9628 – not issued
- ILPS 9629 – Bunny Wailer : Bunny Wailer Sings The Wailers (1981)
- ILPS 9631 – The Paragons : Sly & Robbie Meet The Paragons (1981)
- MLPS 9632 – V.A. : The "King Kong" Compilation (Label: Mango), 1981
- ILPS 9633 – Pablo Moses : Pave The Way (1981)
- ILPS 9634 – not issued
- ILPS 9635 – The Melodians : Sweet Sensations (1981)
- ILPS 9636 – not issued
- ILPS 9637 – Foghat : Tight Shoes (1980)
- ILPS 9638 – not issued
- ILPS 9639 – not issued
- ILPS 9640 – V.A. : Crucial Reggae Driven by Sly & Robbie (1981)
- ILPS 9641 – Basement 5 : 1965–1980 (1980)
- ILPS 9642 – Utopia : Deface the Music (1980)
- ILPS 9643 – not issued
- ILPS 9644 – Brian Briggs : Brian Damage (1980)
- ILPS 9645 – not issued
- ILPS 9646 – U2 : Boy (1980)
- ILPS 9647 – Toots & the Maytals : Live (1980)
- ILPS 9648 – Marianne Faithfull : Dangerous Acquaintances (1981)
- ILPS 9649 – Judy Mowatt : Black Woman (label: Island/Grove Muzic) (1980)
- ILPS 9650 – Linton Kwesi Johnson : LKJ in Dub (1980)
- ILPS 9651 – not issued
- ILPS 9652 – not issued
- ILPS 9653 – not issued
- ILPS 9654 – Kate & Anna McGarrigle – French Record (not issued; transferred to Hannibal HNBL 1302)
- ILPS 9655 – The Jags : No Tie Like A Present (1981)
- ILPS 9656 – Ryuichi Sakamoto : B2-Unit (1980)
- ILPS 9657 – Todd Rundgren Healing (1981)
- ILPS 9658 – Manu Dibango : Ambassador (1981)
- ILPS 9659 – not issued
- ILPS 9660 – not issued
- ILPS 9661 – not issued
- ILPS 9662 – V.A. : Sly & Robbie Present Taxi (1981)
- ILPS 9663 – not issued
- ILPS 9664 – not issued
- ILPS 9665 – Robert Palmer : Maybe It's Live, 1982
- ILPS 9666 – Was (Not Was) : Was (Not Was) (1981)
- ILPS 9667 – V.A. : SeiZE The Beat (Label: ZE), 1981
- MLPS 9668 – Sly & Robbie : The Sixties + Seventies + Eighties = Taxi (Label: Mango), 1981
- ILPS 9669 – Gregory Isaacs : More Gregory, 1981
- ILPS 9670 – Toots & the Maytals : Knock Out, 1981
- ILPS 9671 – Jimmy Riley : Rydim Driven (Label: Taxi), 1981
- ILPS 9672 – not issued
- ILPS 9673 – Sly Dunbar : Sly-Go-Ville, 1982
- ILPS 9674 – not issued
- ILPS 9675 – Adrian Belew : Lone Rhino (1982)
- ILPS 9676 – Pete Shelley : Homo Sapiens (Label: Genetic), 1981
- ILPS 9677 – not issued
- ILPS 9678 – not issued
- ILPS 9679 – not issued
- ILPS 9680 – U2 : October, 1981
- ILPS 9681 – not issued
- ILPS 9682 – Excalibur : Excalibur, 1981
- ILPS 9683 – not issued
- ILPS 9684 – not issued
- ILPS 9685 – not issued
- ILPS 9686 – Tom Tom Club : Tom Tom Club, 1981
- XILP 9687 – Charlélie Couture : Poèmes Rock, 1981
- ILPS 9688 – Elli & Jacno : Tout Va Sauter 1980
- ILPS 9689 – not issued
- ILPS 9690 – Mathématiques Modernes : Les Visiteurs Du Soir (Label: Celluloid), 1981
- ILPS 9691 – not issued
- ILPS 9692 – Alan Vega : "Collision Drive" (Label: Celluloid), 1981
- ILPS 9693 – Material : "Memory Serves" (Label: Celluloid /Metropolis), 1981
- ILPS 9694 – not issued
- ILPS 9695 – not issued
- ILPS 9696 – Black Uhuru : Tear It Up, 1982
- MLPS 9697 – V.A. : Sound d'Afrique (Label: Mango), 1981
- ILPS 9698 – V.A. : The Secret Policeman's Other Ball (The Music), 1982
- ILPS 9699 – Gwen Guthrie : Gwen Guthrie, 1982
- ILPS 9700 – Joe Cocker : Sheffield Steel, 1982
- ILPS 9701 – Black Uhuru : Chill Out, 1982
- ILPS 9702 – not issued
- ILPS 9703 – not issued
- ILPS 9704 – not issued
- ILPS 9705 – V.A. : Raiders Of The Lost Dub, 1981
- ILPS 9706 – Cat Stevens : Morning Has Broken, 1981
- ILPS 9707 – not issued
- ILPS 9708 – Peer Raben : Lili Marleen (Soundtrack) (Label: Metropolis), 1981
- ILPS 9709 – not issued
- ILPS 9710 – not issued
- ILPS 9711 – Aswad : A New Chapter Of Dub, 1982
- ILPS 9712 – King Sunny Adé : Ju Ju Music, 1982
- ILPS 9713 – Barry Reynolds : I Scare Myself, 1982
- ILPS 9714 – Tony Tuff Tuff : Selection, 1982
- ILPS 9715 – John Martyn : The Electric John Martyn, 1982
- ILPS 9716 – not issued
- ILPS 9717 – Michael Smith : Mi Cyaan Believe It, 1982 Discogs
- ILPS 9718 – not issued
- ILPS 9719 – Free : Completely Free, 1982
- ILPS 9720 – Robert Palmer : Pride, 1983
- ILPS 9721 – Gregory Isaacs : Night Nurse, 1982
- ILPS 9722 – Grace Jones : Living My Life, 1982
- ILPS 9723 – Aswad : Live and Direct, 1983
- ILPS 9724 – not issued
- ILPS 9725 – not issued
- ILPS 9726 – not issued
- ILPS 9727 – not issued
- ILPS 9728 – not issued
- ILPS 9729 – not issued
- ILPS 9730 – V.A. : Crucial Reggae – Driven by Sly & Robbie, 1982
- ILPS 9731 – not issued
- ILPS 9732 – Jackie Genova : Work That Body, 1983
- ILPS 9733 – U2 : War, 1983
- ILPS 9734 – Marianne Faithfull : A Childs Adventure, 1983
- ILPS 9735 – Szajner : Brute Reason, 1983
- ILPS 9736 – Set The Tone : Shiftin' Air Affair, 1983
- ILPS 9737 – King Sunny Adé : Synchro System, 1983
- ILPS 9738 – Tom Tom Club : Close To The Bone, 1983
- ILPS 9739 – David Joseph : The Joys Of Life, 1983
- ILPS 9740 – Louise Bennett : Yes'm, Dear: Miss Lou Live, 1983
- ILPS 9741 – not issued
- ILPS 9742 – Paul Haig : Rhythm Of Life, 1983
- ILPS 9743 – Kid Creole & The Coconuts : Doppelganger, 1983
- ILPS 9744 – not issued
- ILPS 9745 – not issued
- ILPS 9746 – King Sunny Adé : Aura, 1984
- ILPS 9747 – Rupert Hine : The Wildest Wish To Fly, 1983
- ILPS 9748 – Gregory Isaacs : Out Deh!, 1983
- ILPS 9749 – Jackie Genova : Work That Body into Ski-Shape, 1983
- ILPS 9750 – Joe Cocker : Sheffield Steel, 1982
- ILPS 9751 – Adrian Belew : Lone Rhino, 1982
- ILPS 9752 – Black Uhuru : Chill Out, 1983
- ILPS 9753 – Barry Briggs : Wide Awake (Label: Mango), 1983
- MLPS 9754 – V.A. : Sound d'Afrique II Soukous (Label: Mango), 1982
- ILPS 9755 – not issued
- ILPS 9756 – Black Uhuru : The Dub Factor (Label: Mango), 1983
- ILPS 9757 – V.A. : They Call it an Accident (Soundtrack), 1983
- ILPS 9758 – Gwen Guthrie : Portrait, 1983
- ILPS 9759 – The B-52s : Whammy, 1983
- ILPS 9760 – Bob Marley & The Wailers : Confrontation, 1983
- ILPS 9761 – NYC Peech Boys : Life Is Something Special, 1983
- ILPS 9762 – Tom Waits : Swordfish Trombones, 1983
- ILPS 9763 – not issued
- ILPS 9764 – not issued
- ILPS 9765 – Will Powers : Dancing for Mental Health, 1983
- ILPS 9766 – not issued
- ILPS 9767 – not issued
- ILPS 9768 – Adrian Belew : Twang Bar King, 1983
- ILPS 9769 – Black Uhuru : Anthem, 1984
- ILPS 9770 – Linton Kwest Johnson : Making History, 1984)
- ILPS 9771 – not issued
- ILPS 9772 – not issued
- ILPS 9773 – Black Uhuru : Anthem (Remixed), 1984
- ILPS 9774 – Lee Perry : History Mystery Prophesy, 1984
- ILPS 9775 – The Skatalites : Return of the Big Guns, 1984
- ILPS 9776 – not issued
- ILPS 9777 – Steve Winwood : Talking Back to the Night, 1982
- ILPS 9778 – Dean Fraser : Pumping Air, 1984
- ILPS 9779 – John Martyn : Saffire, 1984
- ILPS 9780 – Aswad : Rebel Souls, 1984
- ILPS 9781 – Toots & the Maytals : Reggae Greats, 1985
- ILPS 9782 – Gregory Issacs : Reggae Greats, 1985
- ILPS 9783 – Steel Pulse : Reggae Greats, 1985
- ILPS 9784 – V.A. : Reggae Greats, 1985
- ILPS 9785 – Burning Spear : Reggae Greats, 1985
- ILPS 9786 – Linton Kwest Johnson : Reggae Greats, 1985
- ILPS 9787 – Sly & Robbie : Reggae Greats, 1985
- ILPS 9788 – V.A. : Strictly for Lovers, 1985
- ILPS 9789 – Third World : Reggae Greats, 1985
- ILPS 9790 – Pablo Moses : Reggae Greats, 1985
- ILPS 9791 – Jacob Miller : Reggae Greats, 1985
- ILPS 9792 – Lee Perry : Reggae Greats, 1985
- ILPS 9793 – Black Uhuru : Reggae Greats, 1985
- ILPS 9794 – Jimmy Cliff : Reggae Greats, 1985
- ILPS 9795 – The Wailers : Reggae Greats, 1985
- ILPS 9796 – V.A. : Strictly for Rockers, 1985
- ILPS 9797 – not issued
- ILPS 9798 – not issued
- ILPS 9799 – not issued
- ILPS 9800 – Ini Kamuze : Statement, 1984
- ILPS 9801 – Robert Palmer : Riptide, 1985
- ILPS 9802 – The Long Ryders : State of Our Union; 1985
- ILPS 9803 – Tom Waits : Rain Dogs, 1985 Discogs
- ILPS 9804 – not issued
- ILPS 9805 – Rain Parade : Crashing Dream, 1985
- ILPS 9806 – Anthrax : Spreading The Disease, 1985
- ILPS 9807 – John Martyn : Piece By Piece, 1986
- ILPS 9808 – not issued
- ILPS 9809 – Arrow : Knock Dem Dead, 1985
- ILPS 9810 – not issued
- ILPS 9811 – not issued
- ILPS 9812 – not issued
- ILPS 9813 – not issued
- ILPS 9814 – not issued
- ILPS 9815 – not issued
- ILPS 9816 – not issued
- ILPS 9817 – not issued
- ILPS 9818 – not issued
- ILPS 9819 – not issued
- ILPS 9820 – not issued
- ILPS 9821 – not issued
- ILPS 9822 – not issued
- ILPS 9823 – Cat Stevens : Footsteps in the Dark, 1984
- ILPS 9824 – Pearl Harbor : Pearl's Galore, 1984
- ILPS 9825 – V.A. : Tommy Boy – Greatest Beats, 1985
- ILPS 9826 – Nick Drake : Heaven in a Wildflower – An Explanation of Nick Drake, 1985
- ILPS 9827 – Ronald Shannon Jackson & The Decoding Society : Decode Yourself, 1985
- ILPS 9828 – Wobble & Marland : "Neon Moon", 1985
- ILPS 9829 – not issued
- ILPS 9830 – Animal Nightlife : Shangri La, 1985
- ILPS 9831 – Sly & Robbie : Language Barrier, 1985
- ILPS 9832 – not issued
- ILPS 9833 – V.A. : Power Jam '85, 1985
- ILPS 9834 – V.A. : Masters of the Beat, 1985
- ILPS 9835 – not issued
- ILPS 9836 – not issued
- ILPS 9837 – Force MD's : Tender Love, 1985
- ILPS 9838 – not issued
- ILPS 9839 – not issued
- ILPS 9840 – not issued
- ILPS 9841 – not issued
- ILPS 9842 – not issued
- ILPS 9843 – Bob Marley & The Wailers : Rebel Music, 1986
- ILPS 9844 – Steve Winwood : Back in the High Life, 1986; Collectable Records.ru
- ILPS 9845 – Ini Kamoze : Pirate, 1986
- ILPS 9846 – Courtney Pine : Journey To The Urge Within, 1986
- ILPS 9847 – not issued
- ILPS 9848 – not issued
- ILPS 9849 – Shriekback : Big Night Music, 1986
- ILPS 9850 – not issued
- ILPS 9851 – Amazulu : Amazulu, 1985
- ILPS 9852 – not issued
- ILPS 9853 – not issued
- ILPS 9854 – not issued
- ILPS 9855 – The Comsat Angels : Chasing Shadows, 1986
- ILPS 9856 – Junior Delgado : Raggamuffin Year, 1986
- ILPS 9857 – not issued
- ILPS 9858 – not issued
- ILPS 9859 – not issued
- ILPS 9860 – not issued
- ILPS 9861 – Julian Cope : Saint Julian. 1987
- ILPS 9862 – V.A. : Taxi Connection – Live in London, 1986
- ILPS 9863 – not issued
- ILPS 9864 – not issued
- ILPS 9865 – Anthrax : Among the Living, 1987
- ILPS 9866 – not issued
- ILPS 9867 – not issued
- ILPS 9868 – not issued
- ILPS 9869 – The Long Ryders : Two-Fisted Tales, 1987
- ILPS 9870 – not issued
- ILPS 9871 – The B-52's : Bouncing Off the Satellites, 1986
- ILPS 9872 – not issued
- ILPS 9873 – The Undivided : The Original Undivided, 1987
- ILPS 9874 – Marianne Faithfull : Strange Weather, 1987
- ILPS 9875 – not issued
- ILPS 9876 – The Christians : The Christians, 1987
- ILPS 9877 – Buckwheat Zydeco : On a Night Like This, 1987
- ILPS 9878 – V.A. : Serious Dub, 1987
- ILPS 9879 – Melissa Etheridge : Melissa Etheridge, 1988
- ILPS 9880 – not issued
- ILPS 9881 – not issued
- ILPS 9882 – not issued
- ILPS 9883 – Fairport Convention : In Real Time (Live '87), 1987
- ILPS 9884 – not issued
- ILPS 9885 – The Triffids : Calenture, 1987
- ILPS 9886 – not issued
- ILPS 9887 – not issued
- ILPS 9888 – not issued
- ILPS 9889 – not issued
- ILPS 9890 – not issued
- ILPS 9891 – not issued
- ILPS 9892 – not issued
- ILPS 9893 – not issued
- ILPS 9894 – not issued
- ILPS 9895 – not issued
- ILPS 9896 – not issued
- ILPS 9897 – Wally Badarou : Words of a Mountain, 1989
- ILPS 9898 – not issued
- ILPS 9899 – not issued
- ILPS 9900 – not issued
- ILPS 9901 – not issued
- ILPS 9902 – not issued
- ILPS 9903 – not issued
- ILPS 9904 – not issued
- ILPS 9905 – not issued
- ILPS 9906 – not issued
- ILPS 9907 – not issued
- ILPS 9908 – not issued
- ILPS 9909 – not issued
- ILPS 9910 – Shriekback : Go Bang!, 1988
- ILPS 9911 – not issued
- ILPS 9912 – not issued
- ILPS 9913 – not issued
- ILPS 9914 – not issued
- ILPS 9915 – not issued
- ILPS 9916 – Anthrax : State of Euphoria, 1988
- ILPS 9917 – Buckwheat Zydeco : Taking It Home, 1988
- ILPS/CID 9918 – Julian Cope : My Nation Underground, 1988
- ILPS 9919 – not issued
- ILPS 9920 – Kevin McDermott Orchestra : Mother Nature's Kitchen, 1989
- ILPS 9921 – Jim Capaldi : Some Come Running, 1988
- ILPS 9922 – not issued
- ILPS 9923 – Etta James : Seven Year Itch, 1988
- ILPS 9924 – not issued
- ILPS 9925 – Gavin Friday : Each Man Kills The Thing He Loves, 1989
- ILPS 9926 – not issued
- ILPS 9927 – Leatherwolf : Street Ready, 1989
- ILPS 9928 – The Triffids : The Black Swan, 1989
- ILPS 9929 – V.A.: Scandal Ska, 1989
- ILPS 9930 – not issued
- ILPS 9931 – not issued
- ILPS 9932 – not issued
- ILPS 9933 – not issued
- ILPS 9934 – not issued
- ILPS 9935 – not issued
- ILPS 9936 – not issued
- ILPS 9937 – not issued
- ILPS 9938 – Vain : No Respect, 1989
- ILPS 9939 – not issued
- ILPS 9940 – not issued
- ILPS 9941 – not issued
- ILPS 9942 – not issued
- ILPS 9943 – not issued
- ILPS 9944 – Robert Palmer : Addictions Volume 1, 1989
- ILPS 9945 – Free : The Free Story (reissue), 1989
- ILPS 9946 – Webb Wilder : Hybrid Vigor, 1989
- ILPS 9947 – not issued
- ILPS 9948 – The Christians : Colour, 1990
- ILPS 9949 – Hinterland : Kissing the Roof of Heaven, 1990
- ILPS 9950 – not issued
- ILPS 9951 – not issued
- ILPS 9952 – not issued
- ILPS 9953 – not issued
- ILPS 9954 – not issued
- ILPS 9955 – not issued
- ILPS 9956 – not issued
- ILPS 9957 – not issued
- ILPS 9958 – John Mayall & The Bluesbreakers : A Sense of Place, 1990
- ILPS 9959 – not issued
- ILPS 9960 – not issued
- ILPS 9961 – not issued
- ILPS 9962 – not issued
- ILPS 9963 – Stevie Salas : Colorcode, 1990
- ILPS 9964 – not issued
- ILPS 9965 – not issued
- ILPS 9966 – not issued
- ILPS 9967 – Anthrax : Persistence of Time, 1990
- ILPS 9968 – not issued
- ILPS 9969 – not issued
- ILPS 9970 – not issued
- ILPS/CID 9971 – Claudia Brücken : Love: And A Million Other Things, 1991
- ILPS 9972 – not issued
- ILPS 9973 – Nine Inch Nails : Pretty Hate Machine, 1989
- ILPS 9974 – not issued
- ILPS 9975 – not issued
- ILPS 9976 – not issued
- ILPS 9977 – Julian Cope : Peggy Suicide, 1991
- ILPS 9978 – not issued
- ILPS 9979 – not issued
- ILPS 9980 – Anthrax : Attack of the Killer B's, 1991
- ILPS 9981 – not issued
- ILPS 9982 – not issued
- ILPS 9983 – Gavin Friday : Adam 'N' Eve, 1992
- ILPS 9984 – not issued
- ILPS 9985 – not issued
- ILPS 9986 – not issued
- ILPS 9987 – not issued
- ILPS 9988 – Ronny Jordan : The Antidote, 1992
- ILPS 9989 – not issued
- ILPS 9990 – not issued
- ILPS 9991 – Drivin' N Cryin' : Fly Me Courageous, 1991
- ILPS 9992 – not issued
- ILPS 9993 – Tom Waits : Bone Machine, 1992
- ILPS 9994 – not issued
- ILPS 9995 – not issued
- ILPS 9996 – not issued
- ILPS 9997 – Julian Cope : Jehovahkill, 1992
- ILPS 9998 – Courtney Pine : In the Eyes of Creation, 1992
- ILPS 9999 – not issued

==== ISSP series ====
- ISSP 4003 – V.A.: Sound d'Afrique, 1981
  - LP: Island ISSP 4003, Side 1 / UK, 1981
  - LP: Island ISSP 4003, Side 2 / UK, 1981
  - CD: Mango CCD 9697 /US, ca. 1990
- ISSP 4004 – V.A.: Disco Rough (Celluloid label), 1982; Discogs
- ISSP 4006 – The B-52's: Mesopotamia, 1982; Discogs
- ISSP 4007 – V.A.: Genius of Rap, (2LP), 1982; Discogs
- ISSP 4008 – V.A.: Sound d'Afrique, Vol. 2, 1982
  - LP: Island ISSP 4008, Side 1 / UK, 1982
  - LP: Island ISSP 4008, Side 2 / UK, 1982
  - CD: Mango CCD 9754 /US, ca. 1990
- ISSP 4012 – Taxi Gang: Electro Reggae, Vol. 1 (Mango label), 1986

==== ISTA series ====
This series was used for soundtrack albums that were released on the label and also on a sublabel called Island Visual Arts.

- ISTA 1 – not issued
- ISTA 2 – Various Artists: They Call it an Accident (Soundtrack), 1983
- ISTA 3 – Various Artists: An Officer and a Gentleman (Soundtrack), 1982
- ISTA 4 – Philip Glass: Koyaanisqatsi (Soundtrack), 1982
- ISTA 5 – not issued
- ISTA 6 – Mel Brooks and Anne Bancroft: To Be or Not to Be (Soundtrack), 1983
- ISTA 7 – Carl Davis: Champions (Soundtrack), 1984
- ISTA 8 – Trevor Jones: The Last Place on Earth (Soundtrack), 1985
- ISTA 9 – Various Artists: Pumping Iron II: The Women (Soundtrack), 1985
- ISTA 10 – Various Artists: The Frog Prince (Soundtrack), 1985
- ISTA 11 – Various Artists: The Supergrass (Soundtrack), 1985
- ISTA 12 – John Neschling, Nando Carneiro and Wally Badarou: Kiss of the Spider Woman (Original Soundtrack with Music & Dialogue), 1985
- ISTA 13 – not issued
- ISTA 14 – Various Artists: The Big Easy (Soundtrack), 1987
- ISTA 15 – Mitchell Froom: Slam Dance (Soundtrack), 1987
- ISTA 16 – Robert Palmer: Sweet Lies (Soundtrack), 1988
- ISTA 17 – Various Artists: Return of the Living Dead Part II (Soundtrack), 1988
- ISTA 18 – Various Artists: Bagdad Cafe (Soundtrack), 1988

==== ZE ILPS series ====
Around 1980 Island started to distribute a New York-based label, run by Michael Zilkha and Michael Esteban. In the UK the catalogue numbers were composed by the ILPS prefix and numbers starting at 7000. In the US the label was distributed via Island's Antilles label and division.

- ILPS 7000 – Casino Music: Jungle Love, 1979
- ILPS 7001 – Lizzy Mercier Descloux: Press Color, 1979
- ILPS 7002 – The Contortions: Buy, 1979
- ILPS 7003 – unreleased
- ILPS 7004 – Cristina: Cristina, 1980
- ILPS 7005 – unreleased
- ILPS 7006 – unreleased
- ILPS 7007 – Suicide: Suicide (Alan Vega, Martin Rev), 1980
- ILPS 7008 – James White & The Blacks: Off White, 1980
- ILPS 7009 – unreleased
- ILPS 7010 – Suicide Romeo: Pictures, 1980
- ILPS 7011 – Davitt Sigerson, 1980
- ILPS 7012 – Kid Creole & The Coconuts: Off The Coast of Me, 1980
- ILPS 7013 – V.A.: Mutant Disco
- ILPS 7014 – Kid Creole & The Coconuts: Fresh Fruit In Foreign Places, 1981
- ILPS 7015 – Was (Not Was): Was (Not Was), 1981
- ILPS 7016 – Kid Creole & The Coconuts: Tropical Gangsters, 1982
- ILPS 7017 – V.A.: A Christmas Record, 1981
- ILPS 7018 – Sweet Pea Atkinson: Don't Walk Away, 1982
- ILPS 7019 – John Cale: Music For A New Society, 1982
- ILPS 7020 – unreleased
- ILPS 7021 – unreleased
- ILPS 7022 – V.A.: A Christmas Record (Special 1982 Edition), 1982
- ILPS 7023 – James White's Flaming Demoniacs, 1983
- ILPS 7024 – John Cale: Caribbean Sunset, 1984
- ILPS 7025 – Davitt Sigerson: Falling In Love Again, 1984
- ILPS 7026 – John Cale: Comes Alive, 1984

==== Artist related editions ====
Tom Waits

- ITWCD 4 – Tom Waits: Big Time, 1988

U2

(CD versions add "CID" to the beginning)

- U26 – The Joshua Tree, 1987
- U27 – Rattle and Hum, 1988
- U28 – Achtung Baby, 1991
- U29 – Zooropa, 1993
- U210 – Pop, 1997
- U211 – Best of 1980–1990, 1998
- U212 – All That You Can't Leave Behind, 2000
- U213 – Best of 1990–2000, 2002
- U214 – How To Dismantle An Atomic Bomb, 2004
- U218 – U218 Singles, 2006
- U219 – No Line on the Horizon, 2009

=== Island Reggae Greats ===
In 1985, Island released 15 compilation albums dedicated to reggae, presenting twelve of its best (selling) reggae artists and three styles, "DJ", "Lovers" and "Rockers", on one disc each. The albums were compiled by Trevor Wyatt, the covers were illustrated by various artists on the basis of paintings and contain extensive liner notes.

This part of the Island Records discography can be found here: Island Reggae Greats

==== CID 101 series ====
After the CD format was introduced on the record market, Island reacted coolly by releasing only a small number of bestsellers during 1984/1985 introducing the CID (Compact Island Disc) prefix with catalogue numbers starting at 101. Soon after the company started to release new CDs and to re-release older material with the CID prefix and the "ILPS" catalogue numbers.

- CID 101 – Frankie Goes To Hollywood: Welcome To The Pleasuredome (ZTT label), 1985
- CID 102 – U2: Unforgettable Fire
- CID 103 – Bob Marley: Legend
- CID 104 – Wally Badarou: Echoes
- CID 105 – not issued
- CID 106 – not issued
- CID 107 – not issued
- CID 108 – not issued
- CID 109 – not issued
- CID 110 – U2: Boy
- CID 111 – U2: October
- CID 112 – U2: War
- CID 113 – U2: Live / Under a Blood Red Sky
- CID 114 – not issued
- CID 115 – not issued
- CID 116 – not issued
- CID 117 – not issued
- CID 118 – not issued
- CID 119 – not issued
- CID 120 – Philip Glass: Koyaanisqatsi
- CID 121 – not issued
- CID 122 – not issued
- CID 123 – not issued
- CID 124 – not issued
- CID 125 – not issued
- CID 126 – Propaganda: A Secret Wish (ZTT label)
- CID 127 – Andrew Poppy: The Beating of Wings (ZTT label)
- CID 128 – Sly & Robbie: Language Barrier
- CID 129 – not issued
- CID 130 – Robert Palmer: Riptide
- CID 131 – Tom Waits: Raindogs, 1985
- CID 132 – Grace Jones: Island Life, 1985

==== Island Masters ====
In 1989, Island Records was sold to PolyGram. Immediately PolyGram started to re-release parts of the Island catalogue, mainly classics from the 1970s and good selling records from the 1980s within a CD series called Island Masters. The series ran with the prefix IMCD and catalogue numbers starting with 1. The first year of the label has seen more than 70 releases. Finally the catalogue comprised more than 325 titles, from the year 2000 on in re-mastered quality.

The discography can be seen under Island Masters.

== UK releases 1990s and 2000s ==
=== Singles of the 1990s and 2000s ===
==== IS/CID series ====
As CD became the preferred format for the majority of sales, singles released in that format were prefixed CID. Otherwise, the series continued the numbering of the IS series begun in the 1980s. Singles released on a variety of vinyl formats (7", 10", 12", etc.) continued to be prefixed IS (or 10IS, 12IS, etc.). Frequently, CD and larger format releases included additional (or sometimes different) songs to those found on the traditional 7" format.

- IS 444 – And Why Not?: "The Face" b/w "Let Me Hear It", January 1990
- IS 446 – Claytown Troupe: "Real Life", January 1990
- CID 463 – Hinterland: "Desert Boots", July 1990
- CID 470 – Anthrax: "In My World", 1990
- CID 471 – Claudia Brücken: "Absolut(e)", 1990; CD; 12": 12IS 471 / UK
- CID 477 – This Ragged Jack: "The Party's Over", 1990; 12": 12IS 477 / UK
- CID 479 – Claudia Brücken: "Kiss Like Ether", 1990; 12": 12IS 479 / 878 449–1 /UK; 12"-Promo: 12IS 479DJ
- CID 482 – Nine Inch Nails: "Down In It", 1990; 12": 12IS 482 / UK
- IS 483 – Julian Cope: "Beautiful Love" b/w "Port of Saints", 2/1991
- CID 484 – Nine Inch Nails: "Head Like A Hole", 1990/1991; 10" Picture Disc: 10ISP 484 /UK; 12": 12IS 484
- CID 490 – Anthrax: "Bring The Noise", 1991; CD; 12": 12IS 490 / UK
- IS 492 – Julian Cope: "East Easy Rider" b/w "Butterfly E", 1991
- CID 496 – Top: "Number One Dominator", 1991
- CID 497 – Julian Cope: "Head E.P.", 1991; 12": 12IS 497 /UK
- CID 498 – Robert Palmer: "Every Kinda People", 1991; 12": 12IS 498 /UK
- CID 499 – Screaming Target: "Knowledge 'N' Numbers", 1991; 12": 12IS 499 / UK
- CID 500 – U2: "The Fly", 22.10.1991; 12": 12IS 500 / UK
- IS 524 – Robert Palmer: "You're In My System"; 12IS 524 DJ /UK
- IS 548 – The Cranberries: "Dreams" b/w "What You Were", 1992; 12": 12IS 548 (includes extra track "Liar")
- IS 550 – U2: "Who's Gonna Ride Your Wild Horses", 1992
- CID 559 – The Cranberries: "Linger (Live)" / "I Still Do (Live)" b/w "Waltzing (Live)" / "Pretty (Live)", 1994; 10": 10IS 559 / 858 241–0 / UK
- CID 576 – Sheep On Drugs: "Let The Good Times Roll", 1994; 10": 10IS 576 / UK
- IS 591 – The Wedding Present: "It's A Gas" b/w "Bubbles", 1994
- ISC 595 – Pulp: The Sisters EP ("Babies", "Your Sister's Clothes" b/w "Seconds", "His 'n' Hers"), 1994
- IS 600 – The Cranberries: "Zombie" b/w "Away", 1994
- IS 601 – The Cranberries: "Ode To My Family" b/w "So Cold In Ireland", 1994
- IS 629 – V.A.: Don't Be A Menace; 12": 12IS 629 DJ / UK promo
- IS 647 – Lewis Taylor: "Whoever"; 12": 12IS 647 DJ / UK promo
- IS 653 – Lewis Taylor: "Bittersweat"; 12": 12IS 653 DJ /UK promo
- IS 687 – Carrie: "Molly" b/w "Split Up Song", 1998
- IS 689 – Hinda Hicks: "If You Want Me"; 12": 12IS 689 DJ / UK promo; 12": 12ISX 689 DJ / UK promo
- IS 700 – Hinda Hicks: "You Think You Own Me"; 12": 12ISX 700 DJ / UK promo
- CID 711 – Paul Weller: Brand New Start, 1998
- CID 718 – P.J. Harvey: A Perfect Day Elise, 1998
- CID 721 – Hinda Hicks: Truly, 1998
- CID 724 – Talvin Singh: OK, 1998
- IS 738 – Elcka: "Pleasure"; 12": 12IS 738 DJ / UK promo
- IS 740 – Witness: "Scars" b/w "More Miles Away" and "Long First Chapter", 1999
- IS 749 – Witness: "Audition" b/w "Blind Soul Mime" and "Could've Had A Time", 1999
- IS 758 – Witness: "Hijacker" b/w "Lowjacker", 1999
- IS 816 – Bon Garçon: The E.P. ("It's Alright", "Put Your Hands Up" b/w "Love Is Real", "Sunshine Love"), 2003; 12": 12IS 816 DJ / UK promo
- IS 849 – Keane: "Somewhere Only We Know" b/w "Snowed Under", 2004

=== LPs/CDs in the 1990s and 2000s ===
==== CID 8000 series ====
In 1992, Island had reached catalogue number 9999 for its ILP/ILPS series and continued at number 8000. As the principal medium had changed since several years, CID became the general prefix. The independent catalogue numbers seem to have stopped being assigned to Island albums in June 2006.

- CID 8000 – Julian Cope: Floored Genius, 1992
- CID 8001 – Apachi Indian: No Reservation, 1993
- CID 8002 – P.J. Harvey: Rid of Me, 1993
- CID 8003 – The Cranberries: Everybody Else Is Doing It So, 1993
- CID 8004 – Nine Inch Nails: Broken, 1992
- CID 8006 – Sheep On Drugs: Greatest Hits, 1993
- CID 8007 – Inner Circle featuring Jacob Miller: Inner Circle, 1992
- CID 8008 – Drivin 'n' Cryin': Smoke, 193
- CID 8010 – Melissa Etheridge: Yes I Am, 1993
- CID 8011 – Kid Creole & The Coconuts: Cre-ole (Best of Kid Creole & The Coconuts), 1993
- CID 8012 – Nine Inch Nails: The Downward Spiral, 1993
- CID 8013 – not issued
- CID 8014 – The Wedding Present: Watusi, 1994
- CID 8015 – not issued
- CID 8016 – Apache Indian: Make Way for the Indian, 1995
- CID 8017 – Jah Wobble: Take Me To God, 1993
- CID 8018 – V.A.: Peace Together, 1993
- CID 8019 – The Young Americans (soundtrack), 1993
- CID 8020 – Sheep On Drugs: On Drugs, 1993
- CID 8021 – Tom Waits: Black Rider,1993
- CIDD 8022 – The Orb: Live ´93, 1993
- CIDX 8023 – Marianne Faithfull: A Collection of Her Best Recordings, 1994
- CID 8024 – Ronny Jordan Meets DJ Crush: Bad Brothers, 1994
- CID 8025 – Pulp: His'n'Hers, 1994
- CID 8026 – In The Name Of The Father (soundtrack), 1994
- CID 8027 – Anthrax: Live – The Island Years, 1994
- CID 8028 – Deus: Synthology, 1994
- CID 8029 – The Cranberries: No Need To Argue, 1994
- CID 8030 – not issued
- CID 8031 – Deus: My Sister = My Clock, 1995
- CID 8032 – The Orb: The Orb's Adventures Beyond the Underworld, 1991
- CID 8033 – The Orb: U.F.Orb, 1995
- CID 8034 – Santana: Brothers, 1994
- CID 8035 – P.J. Harvey: To Bring You My Love, 1995
- CID 8036 – Gavin Friday: Shag Tobacco, 1995
- CID 8037 – The Orb: Orbus Terrarum, 1995
- CID 8038 – Marianne Faithfull: A Secret Life, 1995
- CID 8039 – Towering Inferno: Kaddish, 1995
- CID 8040 – Moondog Jr.: Every Day I Wear a Greasy Black Feather on My Hat, 1995
- CID 8041 – Pulp: Different Class, 1996
- CID 8042 – Melissa Etheridge: Your Little Secret, 1995
- CID 8043 – Passengers: Original Soundtracks 1, 1995
- CID 8044 – Jah Wobble's Invaders of the Heart: Heaven And Earth, 1996
- CID 8045 – Salt: Ausculate, 1996
- CID 8046 – Puressence: Traffic Jam in Memory Lane, 1996
- CID 8047 – Ronny Jordan: Light to Dark, 1996
- CID 8048 – The Cranberries: To the Faithful Departed, 1996
- CID 8049 – Lewis Taylor: Lewis Taylor, 1996
- CID 8050 – Red House Painters: Songs for a Blue Guitar, 1996
- CID 8051 – John Parrish & P.J. Harvey: Dance Hall at Louse Point, 1996
- CID 8052 – Deus: In a Bar, Under the Sea, 1996
- CID 8053 – V.A.: Later, Vol. 1, 1996
- CID 8054 – V.A.: Later, Vol. 2: Slow Beats, 1996
- CID 8055 – The Orb: Orblivion, 1997
- CID 8056 – Salad: Ice Cream, 1997
- CID 8057 – Elcka: Rubbernecking, 1997
- CID 8058 – Paul Weller: Heavy Soul, 1997
- CID 8059 – Morrissey: Maladjusted, 1997
- CID 8060 – Soul II Soul: Time For Change, 1997
- CID 8061 – Face (soundtrack), 1997
- CID 8062 – not issued
- CID 8063 – not issued
- CID 8064 – Puressence: Only Forever, 1997
- CID 8065 – V.A.: The Birth of the Cool, Seven, 1997
- CID 8066 – Pulp: This Is Hardcore, 1998
- CID 8067 – not issued
- CID 8068 – Hinda Hicks: Hinda, 1998
- CID 8069 – Carrie: Fear of Sound, 1998
- CIDM 8070 – Angelique Kidjo: Oremi (Mango label), 1998
- CID 8071 – Tricky: Angels With Dirty Faces, 1998
- CID 8072 – not issued
- CID 8073 – Lodger: A Walk in the Park, 1998
- CID 8074 – Tindersticks: Donkeys '92–97, 1998
- CIDM 8075 – Talvin Singh: O.K. (Mango label), 1998
- CID 8076 – P.J. Harvey: Is This Desire?, 1998
- CID 8077 – Lock, Stock & Two Smoking Barrels (soundtrack), 1998
- CID 8078 – The Orb: U.F.Off – The Best of The Orb, 1998
- CID 8079 – Cat Stevens: Remember – The Ultimate Collection, 1999
- CID 8080 – Paul Weller: Modern Classics – The Greatest Hits, 1998
- CID 8081 – Deus: The Ideal Crash, 1999
- CID 8082 – not issued
- CID 8083 – not issued
- CID 8084 – Witness: Before the Calm, 1999
- CID 8085 – Tindersticks: Simple Pleasure, 1999
- CID 8086 – not issued
- CID 8087 – Tricky: Juxtapose, 1999
- CID 8088 – The Little Mothers: Worry, 1999
- CID 8089 – not issued
- CID 8090 – Ocean Colour Scene: One From the Modern, 1999
- CID 8091 – Nine Inch Nails: Fragile, 1999
- CID 8092 – G:MT – Greenwich Mean Time (soundtrack), 1999
- CID 8093 – Paul Weller: Heliocentric, 2000
- CID 8094 – The Million Dollar Hotel (soundtrack), 1999
- CID 8095 – Me One: As Far as I'm Concerned, 2000
- CID 8096 – V.A.: Randall & Hopkirk (Deceased), 2000
- CID 8097 – not issued
- CID 8098 – Lewis Taylor: Lewis II, 2000
- CID 8099 – P.J. Harvey: Stories from the City, Stories from the Sea, 2000
- CID 8100 – The Orb: Cydonia, 2001
- CID 8101 – Young Love: Too Young to Fight It, 2007
- CID 8102 – Nine Inch Nails: Things Fall Apart, 2000
- CID 8103 – Talvin Singh: Ha, 2001
- CID 8104 – Ocean Colour Scene: Mechanical Number, 2001
- CID 8105 – not issued
- CID 8106 – Stereo MC's: Deep Down & Dirty, 2001
- CID 8107 – not issued
- CID 8108 – not issued
- CID 8109 – Custom Blue: All Follow Everyone, 2002
- CID 8110 – Pulp: We Love Life, 2001
- CID 8111 – Ocean Colour Scene: Songs From the Front Row – The Best of Ocean Colour Scene, 2001
- CID 8112 – Frou Frou: Details, 2002
- CID 8113 – not issued
- CID 8114 – Tricky: A Ruff Guide, 2002
- CID 8115 – Ali G Indahouse: Da Soundtrack, 2002
- CID 8116 – allSTARS*: allSTARS*, 2002
- CID 8117 – not issued
- CID 8118 – D.J. Shadow: The Private Press, 2002
- CID 8119 – Martin Grech: Open Heart Zoo, 2002
- CID 8120 – Naughty by Nature: Licons (Icons), 2002
- CID 8121 – Default: Fallout, 2002
- CID 8122 – Sugababes: Angels With Dirty Faces, 2002
- CID 8123 – Swimfan (soundtrack), 2002
- CID 8124 – Puressence: Planet Helpless, 2002
- CID 8125 – Stereo MC's: Retroactive – The Best of Stereo MC's, 2002
- CID 8126 – Pulp: Hits, 2002
- CID 8127 – not issued
- CID 8128 – David Holmes: Analyze That (soundtrack), 2003
- CID 8129 – not issued
- CID 8130 – The Good Thief (soundttrack), 2003
- ILPSD 8131 – D.J. Shadow: The Private Repress, 2003
- CID 8132 – Sevendust: Animosity, 2003
- CID 8133 – Nothingface: Skeletons, 2003
- CID 8134 – Bell X1: Music in Mouth – New Version, 2004
- CID 8135 – Span: Mass Distraction, 2004
- CID 8136 – Party Monster (soundtrack), 2003
- CID 8137 – Sugababes: Three, 2003
- CID 8138 – Love Actually (soundtrack), 2003
- CID 8139 – not issued
- CID 8140 – Sevendust: Seasons, 2003
- CID 8141 – Nick Drake: Made to Love Magic, 2004
- CID 8142 – Shaun Of The Dead (soundtrack), 2004
- CID 8143 – P.J. Harvey: Uh Huh Her, 2004
- CID 8144 – not issued
- CID 8145 – Keane: Hopes and Fears, 2004
- CID 8146 – D.J. Shadow: Live! In Tune and On Time, 2004
- CID 8147 – Chiniki: Lick Your Ticket, 2004
- CID 8148 – Amy Winehouse: Frank, 2003
- CID 8149 – Nick Drake: A Treasury – The Best of Nick Drake, 2004
- CID 8150 – Bridget Jones: The Edge of Reason (soundtrack), 2004
- CID 8151 – not issued
- CID 8152 – not issued
- CID 8153 – not issued
- CID 8154 – Dogs: Turn Against This Land, 2005
- CID 8155 – Nine Inch Nails: With Teeth, 2005
- CID 8156 – Leaves: Angela Test, 2005
- CID 8157 – Martin Grech: Unholy, 2005
- CID 8158 – Nine Black Alps: Everything Is, 2005
- CID 8159 – not issued
- CID 8160 – not issued
- CID 8161 – Bell X1: Flock, 2006
- CID 8162 – Sugababes: Taller in More Ways, 2005
- CID 8163 – Ladytrum: Witching Hour
- CID 8164 – not issued
- CID 8165 – Fightstar: Grand Unification, 2005
- CID 8166 – Nine Black Alps: Gutter Gulch EP, 2006
- CID 8167 – Keane: Under the Iron Sea, 2006

==== Island/Chronicles series ====
- CRNCD 1 – Black Uhuru: Liberation – The Island Anthology (2xCD), 1993 (on Mango/Chronicles)
- CRNCD 2 – Free: Molten Gold – The Anthology (2xCD), 1993
- CRNCD 3 – Third World: Reggae Ambassadors – 20th Anniversary Collection (2xCD), 1994
- CRNCD 4 – John Martyn: Sweet Little Mysteries – The Island Anthology (2xCD), 1994
- CRNCD 5 – The Spencer Davis Group: Eight Gigs a Week – The Steve Winwood Years (2xCD), 1996
- CRNCD 6 – Lee "Scratch" Perry: Arkology (3xCD), 1997 (on Island Jamaica/Chronicles)
- CRNCD 7 – Sandy Denny: No More Sad Refrains – The Anthology (2xCD), 2000

==== Island Jamaica series ====
- IJA 2001 – The Taxi Gang (featuring Beenie Man & Luciano): "Crazy Bald Heads", 1994
- IJA 2002 – Luciano: "Your World and Mine" b/w "It's Me Again Jah", 1995
- IJA 2003 – Spanner Banner: "Chill", 1995
- IJA 2004 – Luciano: "How Can You", 1995
- IJA/IJCD 2005 – Chaka Demus & Pliers: "Every Kinda People", 1996 (IJA 2005DJ: promo 12" single)
- IJA 2006 – not issued
- IJA/IJCD 2007 – Luciano Meets Jungle Brothers: Who Could It Be, 1995 (IJA 2007DJ: promo 12" single)
- IJA/IJCD 2008 – Luciano: "Life" b/w "Luciano Medley", 1996 (IJA 2008DJ: promo 12" single)
- IJA/IJCD 2009 – Frankie Oliver: "She Lied To Me", 1996 (IJA 2009DJ: promo 12" single)
- IJA 2010 – Chaka Demus & Pliers: "Boom Smilin'" b/w "Gimme the Gal Dem", 1996 (IJA 2010DJ: promo 12" single)
- IJA/IJCD 2011 – Frankie Oliver: "Give Her What She Wants", 1997 (IJA 2011DJ: promo 12" single)
- IJA/IJCD 2012 Chaka Demus & Pliers: "Hurry Up & Come", 1997 (IJA 2012DJ: promo 12" single)
- IJA 2013 – not issued
- IJA 2014 – not issued
- IJA 2015 – Ambelique, Chevelle Franklyn & The Taxi Gang: "La Bamba" b/w The Taxi Gang featuring Robbie Lyn: "Village Caller", 1997
- IJA/IJCD 2016 – Frankie Oliver: "Who's Gonna Do It", 1997 (IJA 2016DJ: promo 12" single)
- IJA/IJCD 2017 – Luciano: "Life" b/w "Over the Hills", 1997 (IJA 2017DJ: promo 12" single)
- IJA/IJCD 2018 – Chevelle Franklyn featuring Beenie Man: "Dancehall Queen", 1997
- IJLP/IJCD 3001 – Luciano: Where There Is Life, 1995
- IJLP/IJCD 3002 – Sly & Robbie Present The Taxi Gang: Hail Up The Taxi, 1995
- IJLP/IJCD 3003 – not issued
- IJLP/IJCD 3004 – not issued
- IJLP/IJCD 3005 – Beenie Man: Blessed, 1995
- IJLP/IJCD 3006 – not issued
- IJLP/IJCD 3007 – Jimmy Cliff: Higher & Higher, 1996
- IJLP/IJCD 3008 – Chaka Demus & Pliers: For Every Kinda People, 1996
- IJLP/IJCD 3009 – Luciano: Messenger, 1996

==== Island Jamaica/Island Jamaica Jazz series ====
Island released for a short while Jamaican music on new sub-labels Island Jamaica and Island Jamaica Jazz, the latter one obviously responding to the success of bands like Jazz Jamaica and the music by trombone soloists like Rico Rodriguez.

- IJCD 4001 – Monty Alexander: Yard Movement, 1996
- IJCD 4002 – Ernest Ranglin: Below the Bassline, 1996
- IJCD 4003 – Dean Fraser: Big Up!, 1997
- IJCD 4004 – Ernest Ranglin: Memories of Barber Mack, 1997
- IJCD 4005 – The Skatalites: Ball of Fire, 1997

==== Island Masters ====
The series that started in 1989 continued in the first half of the 1990s releasing more material from Island's back catalogue.

The discography can be found under Island Masters.

==== Reggae Refreshers series ====
This series started with 26 releases in 1990. Island used the new label to re-issue a part of its reggae catalogue. Confusing was that some of the titles were also released within the Island Masters series or deleted shortly after the release to be re-released otherwise (the Bob Marley & The Wailers catalogue). More titles had been reissued in 1995, while the parent label changed at least for the European releases from Island to Mango. The UK prefixes were RRCD for CD releases and RRCT for cassettes. Numbers started with 1. Two compilations (numbered 101 and 102 respectively) were released to accompany the series.

- RRCDS 101 – V.A.: Reggae Refreshers, 1990
- RRCDS 102 – V.A.: Reggae Refreshers, Vol. 2, 1995
- RRCD 1 – The Wailers: Catch a Fire
- RRCD 2 – The Wailers: Burnin'
- RRCD 3 – Bob Marley & The Wailers: Natty Dread
- RRCD 4 – Bob Marley & The Wailers: Confrontation
- RRCD 5 – Bob Marley & The Wailers: Rebel Music
- RRCD 6 – Bunny Wailer: Blackheart Man
- RRCD 7 – Bunny Wailer: Protest
- RRCD 8 – Bunny Wailer: Sings The Wailers
- RRCD 9 – Gregory Isaacs: Night Nurse
- RRCD 10 – Lee Perry: Reggae Greats
- RRCD 11 – The Harder They Come (soundtrack)
- RRCD 12 – Black Uhuru: Sinsemilla
- RRCD 13 – Lee Perry: Super Ape
- RRCD 14 – The Heptones: Party Time
- RRCD 15 – Burning Spear: Man In The Hills
- RRCD 16 – Third World: 96 Degrees In The Shade
- RRCD 17 – Steel Pulse: Tribute To The Martyrs
- RRCD 18 – Black Uhuru: Red
- RRCD 19 – The Heptones: Night Food
- RRCD 20 – Burning Spear: Marcus Garvey / Garvey's Ghost
- RRCD 21 – Toots & The Maytals: Funky Kingston
- RRCD 22 – Jimmy Cliff: Reggae Greats
- RRCD 23 – Max Romeo: War Ina Babylon
- RRCD 24 – Steel Pulse: Handsworth Revolution
- RRCD 25 – Ijahman: Are We A Warrior
- RRCD 26 – Linton Kwesi Johnson: Bass Culture
- RRCD 27 – Aswad: Distant Thunder
- RRCD 28 – Black Uhuru: The Dub Factor; Discogs
- RRCD 29 – Sly & Robbie: A Dub Experience – Reggae Greats
- RRCD 30 – Dillinger: CB 200; Discogs
- RRCD 31 – George Faith: To Be A Lover (Have Mercy)
- RRCD 32 – Linton Kwesi Johnson: Forces Of Victory
- RRCD 33 – not issued
- RRCD 34 – Linton Kwesi Johnson: LKJ In Dub
- RRCD 35 – Ijahman: Haile I Hymn (Chapter One)
- RRCD 36 – V.A.: Sly & Robbie Present Taxi
- RRCD 37 – V.A.: Crucial Reggae – Driven By Sly & Robbie
- RRCD 38 – Dean Fraser: Pumpin' Air
- RRCD 39 – Sugar Minott: Black Roots
- RRCD 40 – Burning Spear: Dry And Heavy
- RRCD 41 – Black Uhuru: Anthem
- RRCD 42 – Gregory Isaacs: Reggae Greats – Live
- RRCD 43 – Black Uhuru: Chill Out
- RRCD 44 – Countryman (soundtrack)
- RRCD 45 – Rockers (soundtrack)
- RRCD 46 – Gregory Isaacs: Out Deh!
- RRCD 47 – Jah Lion: Colombia Colly
- RRCD 48 – Michael Prophet: Serious Reasoning (with two bonus tracks)
- RRCD 49 – not issued
- RRCD 50 – Jimmy Cliff: The Best of Jimmy Cliff
- RRCD 51 – not issued
- RRCD 52 – Augustus Pablo: Classic Rockers
- RRCD 53 – Wailing Souls: Wild Suspense
- RRCD 54 – Rico: Roots To The Bone
- RRCD 55 – Lee "Scratch" Perry: From The Secret Laboratory; Discogs
- RRCD 56 – Burning Spear: Harder Than The Best
- RRCD 57 – Junior Murvin: Police & Thieves; Discogs
- RRCD 58 – Toots & The Maytals: Reggae Got Soul
- RRCD 59 – Ini Kamoze: Statement
- RRCD 60 – The Original Soundtrack From Countryman (New Edition)
- RRCD 61 – The Harder They Come (Original Soundtrack Recording) (New Edition)

==== CID/IS series ====
- IS 878 – U2: "Vertigo", 2004
- IS 886 – U2: "Sometimes You Can't Make It On Your Own", 2005

==== ISLR series (promotional use only) ====
- ISLR 15890-2 – Fefe Dobson: "Take Me Away", 2003
- ISLR 15979-2 – Fefe Dobson: "Everything", 2004
- ISLR 16085-2 – Fefe Dobson: "Don't Go (Girls and Boys)", 2004
- ISLR 16269-2 – Fefe Dobson: "Don't Let It Go to Your Head", 2005
- ISLR 16518-2 – Fefe Dobson: "This is My Life (Mainstream Version)", 2006
- ISLR 16521-2 – Fefe Dobson: "This is My Life (Album Version)", 2006

==== Island Masters/Island Re-Masters series ====
While there was no clear label policy the Island Masters were reactivated under the title Island Remasters with remastered works of the back catalogue and more reissues to reach the catalogue number IMCD 327 in 2007.

The discography can be found under Island Masters.
