= The Light of Smiles =

Studio album by Gary Wright
- Released: January 10, 1977
- Recorded: 1976
- Studios: Sound Labs (Hollywood); United Western (Hollywood)
- Genres: Rock, art rock
- Length: 40:39
- Label: Warner Bros.
- Producer: Gary Wright

Gary Wright chronology
The Dream Weaver (1975)	The Light of Smiles (1977)	Touch and Gone (1977)

Singles from The Light of Smiles
- 1. "Phantom Writer" Released: 1977; 2. "The Light of Smiles" Released: 1977; 3. "Are You Weepin'" Released: 1977

The Light of Smiles is the fourth album by American rock musician Gary Wright, released on January 10, 1977, by Warner Bros. Records. It was the follow-up to his commercial breakthrough, The Dream Weaver. The album was produced by Wright and recorded in Los Angeles in 1976. Aside from drums and orchestral strings, the music was created entirely on synthesizers and other keyboard instruments. The lyrics reflect Wright's preoccupation with spirituality, particularly the teachings of Indian yogi Paramahansa Yogananda.

Although the album failed to match the commercial impact of its predecessor, The Light of Smiles was moderately successful and received a favorable response from some music critics. In the United States, it peaked at number 23 on the Billboard 200 album chart, while the single "Phantom Writer" reached number 43 on the Billboard Hot 100.

== Background and recording ==
Gary Wright began writing songs for The Light of Smiles while on tour in 1976, having become a popular concert draw with the success of The Dream Weaver. Recording started in Los Angeles during the summer, with Wright using members of his tour band, including keyboardist Peter Reilich and drummer Art Wood, and session musicians David Foster and Jim Keltner, both of whom had contributed to The Dream Weaver. In early June, Chris Charlesworth of Melody Maker reported that the new album would be "a logical development" of its predecessor and focus solely on sounds generated through keyboard instruments, particularly synthesizers. Played mainly by Wright, Foster and Reilich, the range of keyboard instruments includes clavinet, organ, and Moog, Oberheim and ARP synthesizers. Reilich also provided arrangements for orchestral strings on "Phantom Writer" and "Child of Light".

On "I Am the Sky", Wright gave a songwriting credit to the late Indian guru and Kriya Yoga teacher, Paramahansa Yogananda. The latter's poem "The Light of Smiles", taken from his book Metaphysical Meditations, appeared on the LP's inner sleeve. During the recording sessions, Wright and Foster also contributed to George Harrison's first album for Warner Bros. Records, Thirty Three & 1/3, with Wright playing synthesizer on "See Yourself", one of the album's two Yogananda-inspired tracks. Having been introduced to Yogananda's book Autobiography of a Yogi by Harrison in the early 1970s, Wright subsequently acknowledged the guru as a lifelong influence. The front cover of The Light of Smiles includes a portrait of Wright painted by John Silletto.

== Release and reception ==
Warner Bros. issued The Light of Smiles in January 1977, with "Phantom Writer" as the album's lead single. Wright toured extensively to promote the release. In his 2014 autobiography Dream Weaver: Music, Meditation, and My Friendship with George Harrison, he said he regrets choosing "Phantom Writer" for the single and cites this decision as an example of his "smug" belief that, after his hit singles "Dream Weaver" and "Love Is Alive" in 1976, "anything I released would be hugely successful". Wright says he should have edited down "Water Sign" instead for release as the lead single.

Although it failed to match the commercial success of The Dream Weaver, the album proved popular. On the U.S. Billboard 200 album chart, it peaked at number 23, while "Phantom Writer" reached number 43 on the Billboard Hot 100. Billboard's reviewer recognized The Light of Smiles as an advance on The Dream Weaver, in that "Wright proves himself even more highly developed as a virtuoso of blending ethereal sounds into a brilliantly commercial texture." The reviewer also said: "His arrangements are increasingly varied and dynamic, his voice is more flexible and feathery than ever. This is softly pulsating, spacey music that never gets boring or pretentious."

In his review for Rolling Stone, Stephen Holden admired the album for blending "the erotic and the spiritual into an overawed romanticism" with a subtlety that he found lacking in other examples of contemporary "mystical art rock", and for Wright's use of musical virtuosity "as elements of song structure and not as side trips or self-justifying entities". He said that although the Yogananda-inspired lyrics engaged with spirituality on a more superficial level than artists such as Stevie Wonder, Andy Pratt and Harrison applied in their work, "such sweetness issuing from one who sounds like Stevie Winwood beatified is almost impossible to dislike." Holden concluded by saying that The Light of Smiles was "even sweeter than its predecessor" and so would "cinch Gary Wright's position as prince of the new guru rock". Writing in The Rolling Stone Record Guide, however, Dave Marsh dismissed the album with a one-star review. Marsh grouped it with Wright's next two releases as examples of the artist's overindulgence and propensity for "a spacy, mystical froth of synthesizers and remarkably poor vocalizing".

== Track listing ==
All tracks are written by Gary Wright, except where noted.

Side one
No.	Title	Writer(s)	Length
1.	"Water Sign"		4:33
2.	"Time Machine"		3:36
3.	"I Am the Sky" (from Cosmic Chants by Paramahansa Yogananda)	Paramahansa Yogananda	0:42
4.	"Who Am I"		3:18
5.	"Silent Fury"		4:20
6.	"Phantom Writer"		3:38

Side two
No.	Title	Length
7.	"The Light of Smiles"	3:30
8.	"I'm Alright"	3:35
9.	"Empty Inside"	3:30
10.	"Are You Weepin'"	4:00
11.	"Child of Light"	5:55
Total length:		40:39

== Personnel ==
==== Musicians ====
- Gary Wright – lead vocals, backing vocals, Fender Rhodes, Clavinet, Oberheim synthesizer, Moog bass, ARP synthesizer
- Peter Reilich – piano, Fender Rhodes, Clavinet, organ, Oberheim synthesizer, Moog synthesizer, string arrangements (6, 11)
- David Foster – piano, Clavinet, organ, Oberheim synthesizer, ARP synthesizer
- Steve Porcaro – Moog bass (5)
- Gary Mielke – synthesizer programming
- Jay Graydon – synthesizer programming
- Jim Keltner – drums, percussion
- Art Wood – drums, percussion
- Lorna Wright – backing vocals
- Bettye Sweet – backing vocals
- David Pomeranz – backing vocals
- Justin Wright – vocals (3)

==== Technical ====
- Produced by Gary Wright
- Associate producer and engineer – Jay Lewis
- Title inspiration – Paramahansa Yogananda's Metaphysical Meditations
- Art direction – Robert Lockart
- Paintings – John Silletto
- Photography – Tony Loew
- Design, hand lettering, and background illustration – Cabalka Studio

== Charts ==
Chart (1977)	Peak position
Australian Albums Kent Music Report	75
Canada Top Albums/CDs (RPM)	68
US Billboard 200	23
