= Footprint (album) =

Studio album by Gary Wright
- Released: November 1, 1971 (US); January 21, 1972 (UK)
- Recorded: 1971, London and New York
- Genre: Rock, progressive rock
- Length: 33:04
- Label: A&M
- Producer: Gary Wright; George Harrison (uncredited)

Gary Wright chronology
| Extraction (1970) | Footprint (1971) | Benjamin – The Original Soundtrack of Willy Bogner's Motion Picture (1974) |

Singles from Footprint
- 1. "Stand for Our Rights" Released: May 28, 1971 (UK); 2. "Fascinating Things" Released: November 30, 1971; 3. "Two Faced Man" Released: May 1972

Footprint is the second solo album by American musician Gary Wright, released in 1971 on A&M Records. It contains "Stand for Our Rights", an anthem-like song calling for social unity that was issued as a single in advance of the album. Wright recorded the majority of Footprint in London with a large cast of musicians – including George Harrison, Hugh McCracken, Alan White, Klaus Voormann, Jim Gordon, Jim Keltner and Bobby Keys – many of whom, like Wright, had played on Harrison's All Things Must Pass triple album in 1970. Harrison's contributions included an uncredited role as producer, and serve as an example of his support for Wright during the early stages of Harrison's solo career. The ballad "Love to Survive" is one of three tracks that feature an orchestral arrangement by John Barham.

To promote Footprint in America, Wright performed the song "Two Faced Man" on The Dick Cavett Show, backed by his short-lived band Wonderwheel, with Harrison as guest guitarist. Although it received favorable reviews from some music critics, the album failed to chart in the US or Britain. After recording and touring with Wonderwheel through 1972, Wright rejoined his former band Spooky Tooth, before returning as a solo artist with his breakthrough album, The Dream Weaver (1975).

Footprint was issued on CD in 2005, coupled on a two-disc set with Wright's debut, Extraction (1970). "Stand for Our Rights" and "Two Faced Man" also appeared on the 1998 compilation Best of Gary Wright: The Dream Weaver. The song "Give Me the Good Earth" was covered by Manfred Mann's Earth Band and provided the title for their 1974 album The Good Earth.

== Background ==
After leaving the band Spooky Tooth in January 1970, American keyboard player Gary Wright remained in London and recorded his debut solo album, Extraction (1970), with musicians such as guitarist Hugh McCracken, German bassist Klaus Voormann and future Yes drummer Alan White. That same year, he joined Voormann and White at the sessions for All Things Must Pass (1970), George Harrison's first solo release following the break-up of the Beatles. Wright was one of the principal keyboard players on All Things Must Pass and struck up an enduring friendship with Harrison. Out of gratitude for Wright's musical contributions, Harrison – together with what author Simon Leng terms "half the cast of All Things Must Pass" – participated in the recording of Footprint, Wright's second album for A&M Records. In addition to Voormann and White, these musicians included former Delaney & Bonnie sidemen Jim Gordon, Bobby Keys and Jim Price.

== Recording and musical content ==
Recorded in 1971, the album was engineered by Andy Johns, Wright's co-producer on Extraction, and Chris Kimsey, and again featured McCracken. Although only Wright received a production credit on the album, he has since stated that Harrison produced part of Footprint, and has variously named "Two Faced Man" and "Stand for Your Rights" as having been produced by the former Beatle. Harrison's contributions were credited to his pseudonym "George O'Hara" and included slide guitar on some of the tracks. Other musicians at the sessions were drummers Jim Keltner and Colin Allen, along with Mick Jones (guitar) and Bryson Graham (drums), both members of Wright's new back-up band, Wonderwheel.

In his 2014 autobiography, Wright says he considers Footprint to be "a far more melodic album than Extraction", adding: "I felt my songwriting was beginning to blossom." John Barham, Harrison's regular orchestral arranger, provided string arrangements on some of the album's songs. One such track was the ballad "Love to Survive", which Barham later described as "one of the most emotionally powerful love songs that I have ever worked on". In his biography of Harrison, Leng notes the influence of "Love to Survive" on the ex-Beatle's subsequent songwriting, particularly "That Is All", released on Living in the Material World (1973).

Wright has described "Stand for Your Rights", the album's advance single, as "a call for people to change their paradigms and unite, a reaction to the Vietnam War, and the upheaval of social values at the time". According to Wright, he and Harrison "structured the track together", with Harrison suggesting they add a gospel chorus "to get the right vibe" for the song, and also coming up with Keys and Price's horn parts. Supporting Wright on the basic track, which was taped at Olympic Studios, Gordon and Keltner played drums, with Jerry Donahue and Allen on percussion, Harrison and McCracken on guitars, White on harpsichord and Voormann playing bass. London-based American soul singers Doris Troy, Madeline Bell, Nanette Newman and P.P. Arnold were among the backing vocalists, who recorded their parts the following day. Wright says he was confident that the song already sounded like a "smash hit", but "the icing on the cake" was King Curtis' overdubbed saxophone solo. Curtis recorded his contribution in New York, playing various parts from which Wright and Johns then edited a composite solo.

The opening track on Footprint, "Give Me the Good Earth", also featured Keltner, whose style of drumming impressed Wright and would feature again on the latter's 1975 single "Dream Weaver". In Wright's recollection, White was the drummer on the majority of Footprint, and he highlights McCracken's "special touch" as a guitarist on "Fascinating Things".

== Release ==
A&M Records released "Stand for Our Rights", backed with the non-album B-side "Can't See the Reason", on May 28, 1971, in Britain. Footprint was issued in America on November 1 (as A&M SP 4296), with a UK release following on January 21, 1972 (AMLS 64296). The album cover consisted of a photo of Wright taken by Ethan Russell, with a painting by Joe Garnett on the back cover. The US release coincided with that of B.B. King in London, an album by blues guitarist B.B. King on which Wright played piano and organ. As a second single off Footprint, A&M issued "Fascinating Things" backed with "Love to Survive", on November 30, 1971.

On November 23, as part of his promotion for the album, Wright and Wonderwheel performed "Two Faced Man" on The Dick Cavett Show in New York. Introduced by host Dick Cavett as "Gary Wright and Wonderwheel – and friend", this performance featured Harrison on slide guitar. Harrison was on Cavett's show primarily to promote the Ravi Shankar documentary Raga (1971), but he had arranged for Wright's band to make its US television debut. In a 2009 interview with vintagerock.com, Wright acknowledged Harrison's efforts to help him during this period of his solo career, and cited the former Beatle's assistance on Footprint and "having me on the Dick Cavett Show". Wright and Wonderwheel's appearance was included on the third disc of The Dick Cavett Show – Rock Icons DVD, released in 2005.

== Reception ==
Professional ratings
Review scores
| Source | Rating |
|---|---|
| AllMusic | 4/5 stars |
| Billboard | (favorable) |
| Christgau's Record Guide | B |

Wright recalls in his autobiography that, despite A&M and the music press being enthusiastic about the potential of "Stand for Our Rights" and Harrison's involvement, neither the single nor the album met with any commercial success – a situation that "stunned" him after the failure of Extraction the previous year. In the magazine's 1971 album review, Billboard described "Stand for Our Rights" and "Whether It's Right or Wrong" as, respectively, "excellent" and "musically superb". Together with "Love to Survive", the reviewer continued, "These powerful cuts warrant heavy airplay on progressive rock stations and will lend considerable impact to the sales impact of this LP." Simon Leng writes of Wright's second solo album: "Although Footprint saw no chart action, it provided evidence of Wright's songwriting talents. One of the highlights was the rousing 'Stand for Our Rights.'"

Village Voice critic Robert Christgau wrote: "Like his mentor, George O'Hara, Gary makes his spiritual home right next to his musical one, close by that great echo chamber in the sky. But unlike George he writes anthems that are forthright and tuneful ... The ecology-minded will also approve of 'Love to Survive' and 'Stand for Our Rights,' both of which are vague enough to appeal to every constituency. Cosmic-commercial lives." James Chrispell of AllMusic describes Footprint as a "superstar-filled record" containing "some fine music", and views it as "[a] much stronger effort" than Extraction.

== Aftermath and reissue ==
Wright continued to work with Wonderwheel through most of 1972. They recorded the album Ring of Changes for A&M, only for the label to cancel its release, and supplied the soundtrack to a German comedy film, Benjamin, which was issued by Ariola Records in 1974. In September 1972, Wright decided to re-form Spooky Tooth, taking with him Jones and Graham from Wonderwheel. He later explained to music journalist Chris Salewicz that he was better suited to "getting the music together and arranging it" in a band setting, rather than being "out front with just backing musicians". After another brief tenure with Spooky Tooth, Wright returned to his solo career in 1974, and achieved significant commercial success with his first album on Warner Bros. Records, The Dream Weaver (1975). In 1974, Manfred Mann's Earth Band used "Give Me the Good Earth" as the opening track for their album The Good Earth.

Footprint remained out of print until December 2005, when BGO Records released it on a two-CD set with Extraction. Before then, "Stand for Our Rights", "Two Faced Man", "Love to Survive" and "Fascinating Things" had appeared on That Was Only Yesterday, a 1976 compilation by A&M that combined tracks from Wright's solo career with recordings by Spooky Tooth. Wright's 1998 career-spanning compilation, Best of Gary Wright: The Dream Weaver, also includes "Stand for Our Rights" and "Two Faced Man".

== Track listing ==
All songs written by Gary Wright.

Side one

1. "Give Me the Good Earth" – 3:17
2. "Two Faced Man" – 3:40
3. "Love to Survive" – 4:48
4. "Whether It's Right or Wrong" – 5:08

Side two

5. "Stand for Our Rights" – 3:32
6. "Fascinating Things" – 5:05
7. "Forgotten" – 4:02
8. "If You Treat Someone Right" – 4:50

== Personnel ==
- Gary Wright – vocals, keyboards, acoustic guitar
- George Harrison – electric and acoustic guitars
- Hugh McCracken – electric and acoustic guitars
- Jerry Donahue – electric guitar, percussion
- Mick Jones – guitar
- Klaus Voormann – bass
- Tom Duffy – bass
- Alan White – drums, percussion, harpsichord
- Jim Keltner – drums
- Jim Gordon – drums
- Colin Allen – drums, percussion
- Bryson Graham – drums
- Bobby Keys – tenor saxophone
- Jim Price – trumpet, trombone
- King Curtis – saxophone
- John Barham – string arrangements
- Doris Troy, Nanette Newman, Madeline Bell, Liza Strike, Barry St John, P. P. Arnold, Jimmy Thomas – backing vocals

== Sources ==
- Harry Castleman & Walter J. Podrazik, All Together Now: The First Complete Beatles Discography 1961–1975, Ballantine Books (New York, NY, 1976; ISBN 0-345-25680-8).
- Gary Graff & Daniel Durcholz (eds), MusicHound Rock: The Essential Album Guide, Visible Ink Press (Farmington Hills, MI, 1999; ISBN 1-57859-061-2).
- Simon Leng, While My Guitar Gently Weeps: The Music of George Harrison, Hal Leonard (Milwaukee, WI, 2006; ISBN 1-4234-0609-5).
- Jörg Pieper, The Solo Beatles Film & TV Chronicle 1971–1980, lulu.com (2012; ISBN 978-1-4092-8301-0).
- Robert Rodriguez, Fab Four FAQ 2.0: The Beatles' Solo Years, 1970–1980, Backbeat Books (Milwaukee, WI, 2010; ISBN 978-1-4165-9093-4).
- Patricia Romanowski & Holly George-Warren (eds), The New Rolling Stone Encyclopedia of Rock & Roll, Fireside/Rolling Stone Press (New York, NY, 1995; ISBN 0-684-81044-1).
- Gary Wright, Dream Weaver: A Memoir; Music, Meditation, and My Friendship with George Harrison, Tarcher/Penguin (New York, NY, 2014; ISBN 978-0-399-16523-8).
