= Touch and Gone =

Studio album by Gary Wright
- Released: November 1977
- Recorded: 1977
- Studios: Sound Labs (Hollywood); High Wave Studios (Los Angeles)
- Genre: Rock
- Length: 36:53
- Label: Warner Bros.
- Producer: Gary Wright

Gary Wright chronology
The Light of Smiles (1977)	Touch and Gone (1977)	Headin' Home (1979)

Singles from Touch and Gone
- 1. "Touch and Gone" Released: 1977; 2. "Starry Eyed" Released: 1977; 3. "Something Very Special" Released: 1977

Touch and Gone is the fifth album by American rock musician Gary Wright. It was released in November 1977 on Warner Bros. Records as the follow-up to The Light of Smiles. Wright changed his approach to songwriting for the album by collaborating with other writers on six of the nine songs. The album was recorded with only keyboard instruments, aside from vocals, drums and percussion.

== Reception ==
Professional ratings
Review scores
Source	Rating
AllMusic	1.5/5 stars
The Rolling Stone Record Guide	1/5 stars

Touch and Gone failed to achieve commercial success. According to Gary Wright, his manager Dee Anthony told him that Warner Bros. were disappointed by the album and considered that none of its songs had hit potential. Having started a U.S. tour in late 1977 to promote the release, Wright was forced to cancel it due to poor ticket sales. The album peaked at number 117 on the Billboard 200 in the United States, while the title track reached number 73 on the Billboard Hot 100 singles chart.

Billboard's reviewer said that the keyboards were "beautifully played and arranged" but that Wright appeared to be overly focused on repeating the success of his 1975 album The Dream Weaver. The reviewer also wrote: "Openings, breaks, arrangements – all are reminiscent of earlier Wright material, yet no cut emerges to break new ground. Vocals and lyrics are exceptional, but the melodies are uninspired." In a review of the "Touch and Gone" single, however, the same publication admired the song as a "spirited rocker" and again highlighted the synthesizer playing. Writing in The Rolling Stone Record Guide, Dave Marsh dismissed Touch and Gone, along with its predecessor, as examples of how, following Wright's breakthrough on The Dream Weaver, he had "indulged himself with increasing flatulence in a spacy, mystical froth of synthesizers and remarkably poor vocalizing".

In his 2014 autobiography Dream Weaver: Music, Meditation, and My Friendship with George Harrison, Wright recalls that "Fear had paralyzed my creative efforts on Touch and Gone, resulting in my being overinfluenced by currently successful albums." He says that its failure made him take stock of his career. After spending the New Year with his friend George Harrison in England, where the pair collaborated on the song "If You Believe" for Harrison's 1979 self-titled album, Wright returned to India to gain a better perspective on his career.

== Track listing ==
All tracks are written by Gary Wright, with additional writers noted.

Side one
No.	Title	Writer(s)	Length
1.	"Touch and Gone"	Richard Reicheg	3:58
2.	"Starry Eyed"	Reicheg	4:10
3.	"Something Very Special"	Jamie Quinn	3:38
4.	"Stay Away"	Quinn	3:36
5.	"Night Ride"	Quinn	4:10

Side two
No.	Title	Writer(s)	Length
6.	"Sky Eyes"		4:50
7.	"Lost in My Emotions"		4:04
8.	"Can't Get Above Losing You"	Quinn; Christina Wright	4:02
9.	"The Love It Takes"		4:10
Total length:			36:53

== Personnel ==
==== Musicians ====
- Gary Wright – lead vocals, backing vocals, Oberheim synthesizer (1–8), Polymoog (1–3, 6–9), Moog bass (1–7, 9), Clavinet (1, 7), Moog solos (5), Oberheim sequencer (6), Fender Rhodes (9), special effects (5)
- Richard Baker – Fender Rhodes (2, 6, 8), Oberheim synthesizer (3, 4), Polymoog (9)
- Peter Reilich – Oberheim synthesizer (2)
- Hiroshi Upshur – Clavinet (3, 9), Oberheim synthesizer (6, 8)
- Bobby Lyle – Fender Rhodes (4, 5), Clavinet (5)
- Gary Mielke – Oberheim synthesizer (6), Oberheim programming
- Art Wood – drums, percussion (1)
- Clydie King – backing vocals (4, 7)
- Venetta Fields – backing vocals (4, 7)
- Sherlie Matthews – backing vocals (4, 7)

==== Technical ====
- Produced by Gary Wright
- Engineered by Matthew Hyde and Gary Wright
- Assistant engineers – Linda Tyler and David Carroll
- Music inspired by Paramahansa Yogananda
- Art direction – John Cabalka
- Photography – Jayme Odgers
- Costume design – Margaretrose

== Charts ==
Chart (1977)	Peak position
US Billboard 200	117
