= That Is All (song) =

Song by George Harrison

from the album Living in the Material World
- Published: Material World Charitable Foundation (administered by Harrisongs)
- Released: 30 May 1973
- Recorded: 10 October 1972
- Genre: Rock
- Length: 3:43
- Label: Apple
- Songwriter: George Harrison
- Producer: George Harrison

"That Is All" is a song by English musician George Harrison released as the final track of his 1973 album Living in the Material World. A slow, heavily orchestrated ballad, it is one of many Harrison love songs that appear to be directed at either a woman or a deity. Harrison wrote and recorded the song during the height of his public devotion to Hinduism; on release, Rolling Stone described its lyrics as "a sort of Hindu In Paradisium".

Recording for "That Is All" took place in London in late 1972, following Harrison's completion of the international aid project begun the previous year with the Concert for Bangladesh. The other musicians on the track include keyboard players Gary Wright, whose fledgling solo career Harrison actively supported during the early 1970s, and Nicky Hopkins. The song's orchestral and choral arrangements were provided by John Barham, who had also worked on Harrison's album All Things Must Pass and Wright's Footprint. "That Is All" has been covered by singers Andy Williams and Harry Nilsson.

== Background ==
As with all the songs on his 1973 album Living in the Material World except for "Try Some, Buy Some", George Harrison wrote "That Is All" over 1971–72, a period marked by both his heightened devotion to Hindu spirituality and his commitment to providing humanitarian aid for the refugees of the Bangladesh Liberation War. With his own career taking second place to the latter endeavour, following the Concert for Bangladesh in August 1971, Harrison's musical activities included helping American musician Gary Wright establish himself as a solo artist. (Note: Although credited only for his contributions on guitar (as "George O'Hara"), Harrison produced part of Wright's second solo album, Footprint, and helped promote the release by arranging for Wright to perform on The Dick Cavett Show. In addition to joining Wright's band for that performance, Harrison invited him to record at the Beatles' Apple Studio in 1972.) Wright's album Footprint was released in November that year and included "Love to Survive", a song that author Simon Leng cites as having been an influence on Harrison's composition "That Is All". "Love to Survive" was orchestrated by Harrison's All Things Must Pass arranger, John Barham, who says that "musically there was a strong rapport" between himself, Harrison and Wright at this time. The friendship was also based on a shared interest in Eastern spirituality, after Harrison had given Wright a copy of Autobiography of a Yogi, a text that Ravi Shankar had introduced to Harrison when he visited India in 1966.

In his autobiography, I, Me, Mine, Harrison comments only briefly on "That Is All", saying: "The melody came to me and I then had to think of lyrics. That's all." Commentators have remarked on how, like many other Harrison compositions – "Long, Long, Long", "Something", "What Is Life", "Don't Let Me Wait Too Long", "Learning How to Love You" and "Your Love Is Forever" among them – it serves as both a conventional love song to a woman and a declaration of devotion to God. Harrison said in a 1976 interview: "I think all love is part of a universal love. When you love a woman, it's the God in her that you see."

== Composition ==
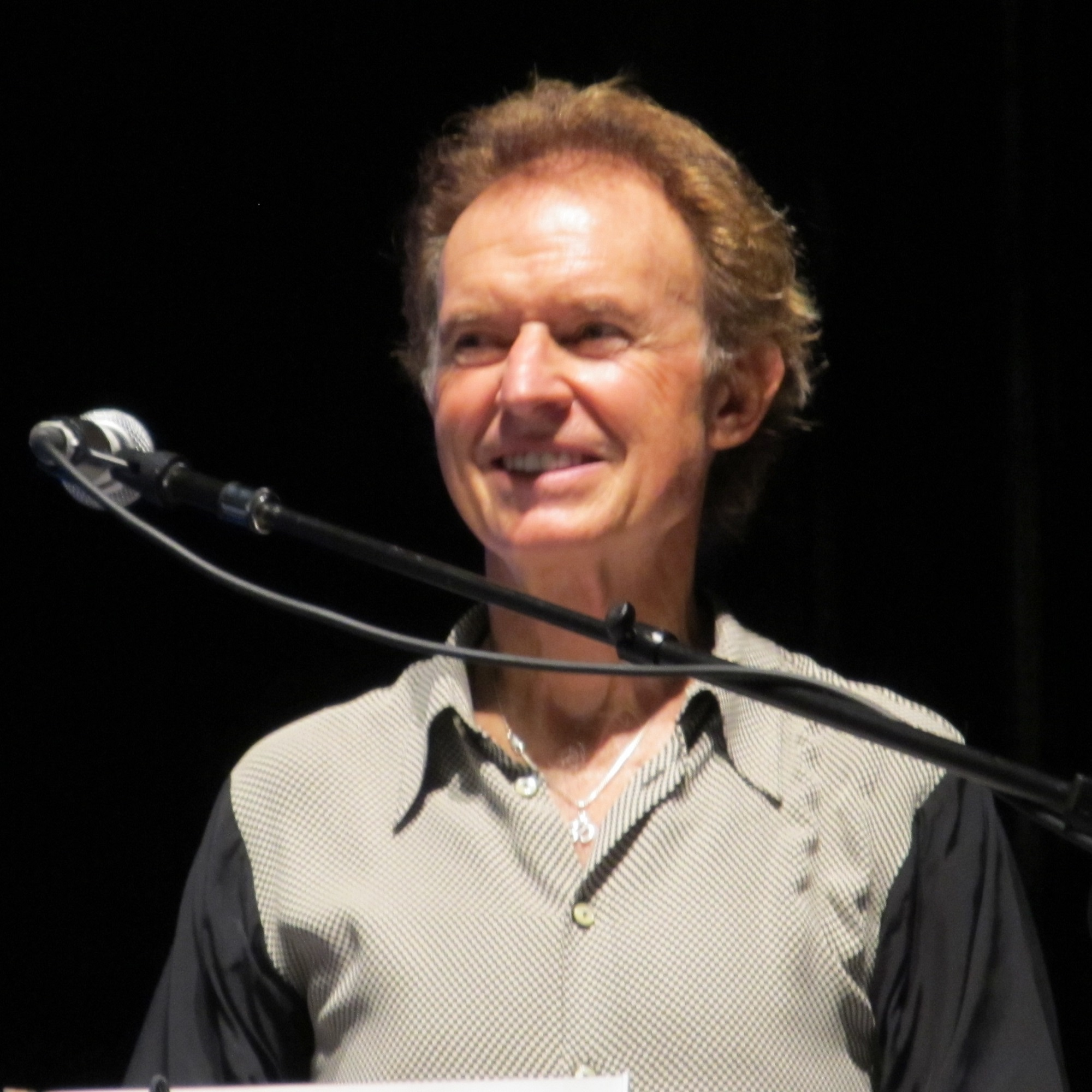
Gary Wright (pictured on stage in 2011), whose song "Love to Survive" provided inspiration for "That Is All"

The song is in the musical key of A. Leng identifies the composition as a development of Harrison's favoured "Something" ballad style. He writes that a number of "characteristic" Harrison musical devices are found in "That Is All" – such as a melody that rises by a half step with each line, and an A minor chord sharpened to an augmented triad "to create drama".

Author Ian Inglis describes the song's melody as "romantic". Referring to its status as the last track on Living in the Material World, he also comments on the appropriateness of Harrison's opening words: "That is all I want to say". Inglis writes that Harrison goes on to state both "[what] he wants to do for his lover" and "what he hopes for in return", in the respective lines "To try to love you more" and "A smile when I feel blue".

Leng considers that the song's middle eight echoes the same "tongue-tied difficulty" that Harrison had first introduced in his 1966 composition "I Want to Tell You":

Times I find it hard to say
With useless words getting in my way
Silence often says much more
Than trying to say what's been said before ...

According to Leng, the change here from a regular 4/4 time signature to 3/8 provides a "stuttering, hesitant syntax" that supports the message behind the words.

Theologian Dale Allison views the concept of "words falling short" in these lyrics as central to "That Is All" and a recurring theme in Harrison's songwriting. Allison also notes the importance of silence in this and other Harrison song lyrics, where it becomes "not an enemy to be shunned but ... a friend to be embraced, for silence can help conduct us to the Divine". (Note: Among other examples, Harrison expresses the importance of silence in the posthumously released "Pisces Fish". In his 1980 track "Sat Singing", he celebrates the process through which a higher consciousness is attained via meditation, with the removal of noise and other physical distractions.) On release, part of the middle eight's lyrics, together with those for the final verse, were identified by music critic Stephen Holden as "a sort of Hindu In Paradisium". While he considers "That Is All" to be a secular, "adult-oriented" love song, Inglis writes of Harrison's message in the middle eight: "language is insufficient to express the depth of his emotion; 'silence' can be more effective, more intimate, more loving."

== Recording ==
The recording sessions for Living in the Material World began in October 1972 after Harrison had spent part of the summer staying with Wright in Portugal. Although Harrison had intended to co-produce the album with Phil Spector as before, he decided to work without him, partly as a result of Spector's erratic behaviour at the start of the sessions. In his 2014 autobiography, Wright says that Spector's dismissal was "the right move"; he describes Material World as his favourite Harrison album and "a beautiful masterpiece showing more of him – without Phil Spector's production". Aside from Harrison, and Wright on keyboards, the musicians on "That Is All" were Nicky Hopkins (on piano), Klaus Voormann (bass) and Jim Keltner (drums).

As with "Who Can See It", another of the album's ballads, Harrison recorded "That Is All" using a Leslie rotary effect on his electric guitar. Having long admired Spector as a producer, he employed elements of his signature production style throughout Material World, but with a degree of subtlety in comparison to the big sound synonymous with All Things Must Pass. As on the latter album, Harrison overdubbed further instrumentation onto the basic tracks recorded in October and November 1972; in the case of "That Is All", the released recording includes a slide guitar solo, and a harpsichord part played by Wright. The song also features string and brass orchestration and a choir, all of which were arranged by John Barham. (Note: The bootleg album Living in the Alternate World includes an early mix of "That Is All" without many of the overdubs, and with only a partial guide vocal from Harrison.)

Work on the album extended through February 1973. The London sessions for Barham's contributions marked the last time that Harrison worked with him during the 1970s. Their collaborations had taken in Harrison's Wonderwall Music, All Things Must Pass and Living in the Material World, as well as Apple projects for Billy Preston, Jackie Lomax and Radha Krishna Temple (London).

== Release and reception ==
Apple Records issued Living in the Material World at the end of May 1973, or late June in Britain. "That Is All" was sequenced to follow "The Day the World Gets 'Round", a song that reflected Harrison's idealism after the Concert for Bangladesh, as well as his frustration at the apathy of governments who had chosen not to intervene on the refugees' behalf. As with eight other tracks on the album and the 1973 B-side "Miss O'Dell", Harrison donated his publishing royalties and the copyright for "That Is All" to his Material World Charitable Foundation.

Writing in Melody Maker, Michael Watts described Living in the Material World as "Harrison's personal statement" documenting his journey towards "a spiritual goal which for the first time he has been able to define". Watts continued: "now he stands as something more than an entertainer. Now he's being honest. When you've been through all the bullshit and come out the other side, that's the only thing you can be." In his review for Rolling Stone, Stephen Holden praised the album's "inspirationally, opulently, romantic" qualities, and he wrote of "That Is All" and "The Day the World Gets 'Round" as "two devotional prayers whose solemn mantra-influenced melodies are barely able to sustain their lush orchestration. Yet they do, so that at the end we are left suspended in ethereality ..." Holden added that "a close listening from start to finish is roughly equivalent to participating in a mass spectacle of religious re-dedication – one that does not end with rousing anthems but in heavenly choirs." Some reviewers objected to the preponderance of ballads on the album, however, as well as the overt religiosity of many of its songs.

In his book The Beatles Solo on Apple Records, Bruce Spizer describes "That Is All" as "a beautiful love song written either for a woman or the Lord". Writing for Rough Guides, author and critic Chris Ingham similarly considers that "the 'love' [Harrison is] so desperate to express" in the song "seems directed as much to an earthly relationship as to any God", and he cites this as an example of the "restraint and, in places, considerable grace and beauty" adopted by Harrison on the album. Among other Beatles biographers, Robert Rodriguez writes that the track "sums up the journey" in the same way as "Hear Me Lord" successfully concludes the song cycle on All Things Must Pass, a view shared by Elliot Huntley, who admires "That Is All" as a "lush orchestral prayer where George really does prostrate himself at His feet". Reviewing the 2014 Apple Years reissue of Material World, Joe Marchese of The Second Disc highlights "That Is All" among songs that combine to provide the album's "earnest and intensely personal, yet wholly accessible, statement".

== Cover versions ==
Given the song's mood and sentiment, authors Chip Madinger and Mark Easter consider "That Is All" to have been suitable for inclusion on a Frank Sinatra album. While Sinatra did not record it, the song was covered by singer Andy Williams, who had been one of the many easy listening artists, along with Sinatra, to cover Harrison's "Something". Featuring contributions from Hopkins, Voormann and Keltner, Williams' version of "That Is All" appeared on his 1973 album Solitaire. The recording was produced by Richard Perry, with whom Harrison worked on Ringo Starr's album Ringo in Los Angeles shortly after completing Living in the Material World.

Harry Nilsson, another associate of Harrison's, recorded "That Is All" for his 1976 album ...That's the Way It Is. (Note: In the spring of 1972, Harrison played slide guitar on Nilsson's Son of Schmilsson track "You're Breakin' My Heart". Viewed as a "thoroughly nasty" song by Leng (it was originally subtitled with the parenthetical phrase "So Fuck You"), this guest appearance by Harrison was in marked contrast to the devout recordings with which he was commonly associated during the early 1970s.) The song appears twice there, as the opening track and as a reprise to close the album. Author and critic Alyn Shipton comments that Nilsson's performance on "That Is All" marked a rare return to the upper-register singing style of his early career. Shipton describes Nilsson's break into falsetto as being "as good as anything he ever recorded".

== Personnel ==
- George Harrison – lead vocals, electric guitar, slide guitar, backing vocals
- Nicky Hopkins – piano
- Gary Wright – electric piano, harpsichord, organ
- Klaus Voormann – bass guitar
- Jim Keltner – drums
- John Barham – string arrangements, brass arrangements, choral arrangement

== Sources ==
- Dale C. Allison Jr., The Love There That's Sleeping: The Art and Spirituality of George Harrison, Continuum (New York, NY, 2006; ISBN 978-0-8264-1917-0).
- Keith Badman, The Beatles Diary Volume 2: After the Break-Up 1970–2001, Omnibus Press (London, 2001; ISBN 0-7119-8307-0).
- Harry Castleman & Walter J. Podrazik, All Together Now: The First Complete Beatles Discography 1961–1975, Ballantine Books (New York, NY, 1976; ISBN 0-345-25680-8).
- Alan Clayson, George Harrison, Sanctuary (London, 2003; ISBN 1-86074-489-3).
- Peter Doggett, You Never Give Me Your Money: The Beatles After the Breakup, It Books (New York, NY, 2011; ISBN 978-0-06-177418-8).
- The Editors of Rolling Stone, Harrison, Rolling Stone Press/Simon & Schuster (New York, NY, 2002; ISBN 0-7432-3581-9).
- George Harrison, I Me Mine, Chronicle Books (San Francisco, CA, 2002; ISBN 0-8118-3793-9).
- Elliot J. Huntley, Mystical One: George Harrison – After the Break-up of the Beatles, Guernica Editions (Toronto, ON, 2006; ISBN 1-55071-197-0).
- Chris Ingham, The Rough Guide to the Beatles, Rough Guides/Penguin (London, 2006; 2nd edn; ISBN 978-1-84836-525-4).
- Ian Inglis, The Words and Music of George Harrison, Praeger (Santa Barbara, CA, 2010; ISBN 978-0-313-37532-3).
- Peter Lavezzoli, The Dawn of Indian Music in the West, Continuum (New York, NY, 2006; ISBN 0-8264-2819-3).
- Simon Leng, While My Guitar Gently Weeps: The Music of George Harrison, Hal Leonard (Milwaukee, WI, 2006; ISBN 1-4234-0609-5).
- Chip Madinger & Mark Easter, Eight Arms to Hold You: The Solo Beatles Compendium, 44.1 Productions (Chesterfield, MO, 2000; ISBN 0-615-11724-4).
- Robert Rodriguez, Fab Four FAQ 2.0: The Beatles' Solo Years, 1970–1980, Backbeat Books (Milwaukee, WI, 2010; ISBN 978-1-4165-9093-4).
- Nicholas Schaffner, The Beatles Forever, McGraw-Hill (New York, NY, 1978; ISBN 0-07-055087-5).
- Alyn Shipton, Nilsson: The Life of a Singer-Songwriter, Oxford University Press (New York, NY, 2013; ISBN 978-0-199-75657-5).
- Bruce Spizer, The Beatles Solo on Apple Records, 498 Productions (New Orleans, LA, 2005; ISBN 0-9662649-5-9).
- Gary Tillery, Working Class Mystic: A Spiritual Biography of George Harrison, Quest Books (Wheaton, IL, 2011; ISBN 978-0-8356-0900-5).
- Gary Wright, Dream Weaver: A Memoir; Music, Meditation, and My Friendship with George Harrison, Tarcher/Penguin (New York, NY, 2014; ISBN 978-0-399-16523-8).
