= Headin' Home (disambiguation) =

- Headin' Home, a 1920 American silent film

Headin' Home or Heading Home may also refer to:

- Headin' Home (Gary Wright album), 1979
- Headin' Home (Jimmy Owens album), 1978
- Heading Home, documentary film about underdog Israel national baseball team
- "Heading Home", a 2016 song by American musician Gryffin

== See also ==
- The Sandlot: Heading Home, 2007 film directed by William Dear
