= Learning How to Love You (disambiguation) =

Learning How to Love You may refer to:

- "Learning How to Love You", a song by George Harrison from his 1976 album Thirty Three & 1/3
- "Learning How to Love You", a song by John Hiatt from his 1987 album Bring the Family
