= The Good Earth (Manfred Mann's Earth Band album) =

Studio album by Manfred Mann's Earth Band
- Released: 11 October 1974
- Recorded: 1974
- Studios: The Workhouse, Old Kent Road, London
- Genres: Hard rock; progressive rock; jazz rock
- Length: 38:09
- Labels: Bronze (UK); Warner Bros. (US)
- Producers: Manfred Mann, Earth Band

Manfred Mann's Earth Band chronology
Solar Fire (1973)	The Good Earth (1974)	Nightingales & Bombers (1975)

Singles from The Good Earth
- 1. "Be Not Too Hard" Released: 1 November 1974

Professional ratings
Review scores
Source	Rating
AllMusic	3.5/5 stars
Christgau's Record Guide	B−
The Encyclopedia of Popular Music	4/5 stars
Rolling Stone	mixed
The Rolling Stone Album Guide	2/5 stars

The Good Earth is the fifth studio album released by Manfred Mann's Earth Band in 1974. Its opening song is a cover of "Give Me the Good Earth", written by Gary Wright and released on his 1971 solo album Footprint, while tracks 2 and 3 were originally by Australian progressive rock band Spectrum.

Early owners of each copy of The Good Earth were entitled to rights over 1 square foot of the earth situated at Llanerchyrfa in the County of Brecon, in Wales. The inner sleeve included a coupon that had to be sent for registration. This was part of the promotion activities linked to the album that had ecological inspirations. There was no swindle and thousands of fans were registered. Registration could be done on or before 31 December 1975.

The album was on the US Billboard 200 charts for three weeks, peaking at number 157 on 7 December 1974.

== Track listing ==
=== Side one ===
1. "Give Me the Good Earth" (Gary Wright) – 8:31
2. "Launching Place" (Mike Rudd) – 5:52
3. "I'll Be Gone" (Rudd) – 3:42

=== Side two ===
4. "Earth Hymn" (Manfred Mann, Chris Slade) – 6:19
5. "Sky High" (Mann, Mick Rogers) – 5:15
6. "Be Not Too Hard" (Rogers, Christopher Logue) – 4:12
7. "Earth Hymn Part 2" (Mann, Slade) – 4:18

=== Bonus Tracks (1998 CD reissue) ===
8. "Be Not Too Hard" (Single version) (Rogers, Logue) – 3:39
9. "I'll Be Gone" (Single Version) (Rudd) – 3:28
10. "Earth Hymn Part 2a" (Single Version) (Mann, Slade) – 4:13

== Personnel ==
The Earth Band

- Manfred Mann – Hammond organ, piano, Hohner clavinet, Minimoog synthesiser, keyboards
- Mick Rogers – guitars, vocals
- Chris Slade – drums
- Colin Pattenden – bass guitar

Technical

- Manfred Mann's Earth Band – producers
- John Pantry – engineer
- Laurence Latham – assistant engineer
- Linda Glover – design
- Alan Shawcroff – photography
- Re-mastered by: Robert M Corich and Mike Brown

== Charts ==
Chart (1975)	Peak position
Norwegian Albums (VG-lista)	20
US Billboard 200	157
