= Alive (3rd Party album) =

Studio album by 3rd Party
- Released: October 7, 1997
- Genres: Eurodance, pop, dance-pop, house
- Label: DV8 Records

Alive is the only album by American eurodance girl group 3rd Party. The album was released on October 7, 1997 by DV8 Records.

In addition to a cover of Gary Wright's 1976 hit "Love Is Alive", this album also contains the original recording of Waiting for Tonight which would become a big hit for Jennifer Lopez two years later, on which Christensen (who also co-wrote the song) also performed background vocals.

== Track listing ==
1. "Can U Feel It" (Arnie Roman, Steve Skinner) – 4:11
2. "Love Is Alive" (Gary Wright) – 3:50
3. "Round & Round" (Andy Marvel, Arnie Roman, Peter Zizzo) – 4:11
4. "Waiting For Tonight" (Maria Christensen, Michael Garvin, Phil Temple) – 4:00
5. "Second Nature" (Christensen, Matt Noble, Denise Rich) – 3:38
6. "So Inspired" (Marvel, Nina Ossoff, Shelly Peiken) – 4:13
7. "One Night" (Rich, Roman, Rich Tancredi) – 4:19
8. "Step by Step" (Gary Haase, Audrey Martells) – 4:30
9. "Love and Emotion" (Christensen, Curt Frasca) – 4:08
10. "If My Heart Could Talk" (Christensen, Jeff Franzel) – 4:33
11. "Listening to the Rain" (Terence Dover, Chris Dover) – 4:13
12. "Can U Feel It (LCD Galactica Mix)" (Roman, Skinner) – 8:55

== Personnel ==
- Maria Christensen – lead vocals
- Karmine Alers – background vocals
- Elaine Borja – background vocals
