= The Right Place (Gary Wright album) =

Studio album by Gary Wright
- Released: May 28, 1981
- Recorded: 1980–1981
- Studio: Hollywood Sound Recorders (Hollywood)
- Genre: Soft rock
- Length: 37:03
- Label: Warner Bros.
- Producer: Gary Wright

Gary Wright chronology
Headin' Home (1979)	The Right Place (1981)	Who I Am (1988)

Singles from The Right Place
- 1. "Really Wanna Know You" Released: July 1981; 2. "Heartbeat" Released: 1981; 3. "Close to You" Released: 1981

The Right Place is the seventh solo album by American rock musician Gary Wright, released on May 28, 1981, by Warner Bros. Records. It was Wright's last album until 1988's Who I Am.

Professional ratings
Review scores
Source	Rating
AllMusic	3/5 stars
Music Week	2/4 stars

== Track listing ==
All tracks are written by Gary Wright, with additional writers noted.

Side one
No.	Title	Writer(s)	Length
1.	"Intro"		0:29
2.	"Heartbeat"	Marty Walsh	4:16
3.	"Really Wanna Know You"	Ali Thomson	4:22
4.	"Got the Feelin'"		3:41
5.	"Love Is a Rose"	Chris Agajanian	4:30

Side two
No.	Title	Writer(s)	Length
6.	"The Right Place"		3:33
7.	"More Than a Heartache"		4:33
8.	"Close to You"		4:07
9.	"Comin' Apart"	Barry Mann; Cynthia Weil	3:51
10.	"Positive Feelins"	Thomson	3:41
Total length:			37:03

== Personnel ==
==== Musicians ====
- Gary Wright – lead vocals, backing vocals, keyboards, synthesizers, Moog bass (1–6, 9), Yamaha CP-70 (2, 3), Fender Rhodes (6, 8), synthesizer programming
- Dean Parks – guitar, additional keyboards (3, 9), bass (7), saxophone (8)
- Casey Young – synthesizer programming
- Marty Walsh – additional rhythm guitar (2, 10)
- George Hawkins – bass (8)
- Tris Imboden – drums (2, 3, 7, 8, 10)
- James Gadson – drums (4, 6)
- David Kemper – drums (5)
- Bob C. Benberg – drums (9)
- Lenny Castro – percussion
- Rod Piazza – harmonica (5)
- Timothy B. Schmit – backing vocals (2)
- David Pack – backing vocals (2, 8)
- Lorna Wright – backing vocals (3, 6)

==== Technical ====
- Produced and engineered by Gary Wright and Dean Parks
- Executive producers – Lenny Waronker and Russ Titelman
- Mixed by Jay Lewis at Hollywood Sound Recorders (Hollywood, CA)
- Assistant mixing engineer – Ross Pallone and Steve McMillan
- Mastered by Mike Reese at The Mastering Lab (Hollywood, CA)
- Cover illustration – Jonathan Meader
- Photography – Bob Seidemann
- Art direction and design – JoAnn Tominaga

== Charts ==
Chart (1981)	Peak position
US Billboard Top LPs & Tape	79

=== Singles ===
Year	Single	Chart positions		
Year	Single	US Hot 100	US AC	US Cashbox
1981	"Really Wanna Know You"	16	32	19
1981	"Heartbeat"	107*	—	—
1981	"Close to You"	—	—	—

*Note: "Heartbeat" peaked on Billboard's Bubbling Under the Hot 100 chart, not the main Hot 100.
