= 3rd Party =

American eurodance group

- Genres: Eurodance, dance-pop
- Years active: 1997
- Label: DV8/A&M/PolyGram Records
- Members: Maria Christensen (vocals); Karmine Alers (backing vocals); Elaine Borja (backing vocals)

3rd Party was an American three-member eurodance group that released one album in 1997. They are best known for their Billboard Hot 100 charting dance hits "Can U Feel It" and "Love Is Alive".

== Background ==
Lead singer Maria Christensen was a songwriter before the band, singing since the age of 5 and writing songs since she was 10 years old. She made her performing debut in 1988 as one half of the Latin freestyle duo Sequal. She has written songs for Nana Mouskouri, Eternal, 'N Sync, and Celine Dion. She had released a self-titled solo album in 1993. Backup singers Karmine Alers and Elaine Borja filled out the racially diverse group. The group formed in the wake of the mid-90s dance-pop movement, following such acts as the Spice Girls. The group released its album Alive in 1997. The album was recorded on Long Island, New York, and produced by Rick Wake. Four of the album's songs were written by Christensen, and two singles were released from it. "Can U Feel It" (#43) was their highest-charting song. "Love is Alive" (#61) was a remake of the song by Gary Wright from his album The Dream Weaver. The album also contained the song "Waiting for Tonight", which was covered by Jennifer Lopez in 1999 for her debut album, On the 6. The remake charted at #8.

== After the band ==
=== Maria Christensen ===
Maria Christensen independently released her second solo album, Beautiful Now, in 2004. In contrast to 3rd Party's uptempo dance music, Christensen's solo music is more soulful and pensive, in the style of Norah Jones. She sang the song "Someone to Someone" on the show "Queer Eye for the Straight Guy". Song-writing proceeds from Lopez's remake of "Waiting for Tonight" allowed her the freedom to release her own album.

=== Karmine Alers ===
Karmine Alers was raised in Spanish Harlem and has been acting and performing since she was a teenager. During college, she was a member of several bands. After leaving 3rd Party, she auditioned for the musical Rent on Broadway in 2001. Like her older sister, Yassmin Alers, she took the role of Mimi. She released the solo album For You... in 2005, which was produced by Jimmy Greco. Like Beautiful Now, it is also soulful and melodic, and showed no trace of Alers's 3rd Party past. A single, "It Matters to Me", was released with a music video. In 2015 she returned to Broadway in On Your Feet!, and she has appeared in national tours of the same musicals.
