= Love Is Alive (Gary Wright song) =

- Side A of the US single

Single by Gary Wright

from the album The Dream Weaver
- B-side: "Much Higher"
- Released: April 1976
- Genre: Synth-rock
- Length: 3:54 (album); 3:24 (single)
- Label: Warner Bros.
- Songwriter: Gary Wright
- Producer: Gary Wright

Gary Wright singles chronology
"Dream Weaver" (1975)	"Love Is Alive" (1976)	"Made to Love You" (1976)

"Love Is Alive" is a song by Gary Wright taken from the 1975 album The Dream Weaver. It features Wright on vocals and keyboards and Andy Newmark on drums, with all music except for the drums produced on the keyboards. The album's title cut and "Love Is Alive" both peaked at No. 2 on the Billboard Hot 100 singles chart. "Love Is Alive" spent 27 weeks on the chart, seven weeks longer than "Dream Weaver". Billboard ranked "Love Is Alive" as the No. 9 song of 1976.

In the US, "Love Is Alive" peaked at number two on the Hot 100, tied with "Dream Weaver" as his highest chart-topping single on that chart. "Kiss and Say Goodbye" by The Manhattans and "Don't Go Breaking My Heart" by Elton John and Kiki Dee kept it from the number one spot. In Canada, the song reached No. 6.

== Chart performance ==
=== Weekly charts ===
Chart (1976)	Peak position
Australia (Kent Music Report)	71
Canada RPM Top Singles	6
U.S. Billboard Hot 100	2
U.S. Billboard Hot Soul Singles	98
U.S. Cash Box Top 100	3

=== Year-end charts ===
Chart (1976)	Rank
Canada	75
U.S. Billboard Hot 100	9

== Covers and samples ==
- Olivia Newton-John covered the track on her first live album Love Performance in 1976. She performed the song on her first 1976 ABC-TV special A Special Olivia Newton-John and on a 1977 BBC special Only Olivia. Her rendition was also included as a bonus track on the 2010 Japanese re-issue of her 1978 album Totally Hot.
- Chaka Khan covered the track as "My Love Is Alive" on her 1984 album I Feel For You.
- In 1991, Joe Cocker covered "Love Is Alive" on his Night Calls LP. Released as a single, it reached number 72 in Canada and number 7 on the U.S. Mainstream Rock chart in the summer of 1992.
- In 1997, dance act 3rd Party recorded the song for their debut album Alive which charted on the Billboard Hot 100. This version peaked at number 19 on the US Billboard Hot Dance Music chart.
- Joan Osborne covered the song on her album Righteous Love (2000). She frequently played it in concert, and one of these performances was included on the compilation album Radio Waves (2022). The Associated Press called her cover version "improbably funky".
- Anastacia covered the song on her 2000 debut album Not That Kind. In 2001, it was re-recorded as a duet with Vonda Shepard for the TV show Ally McBeal. It later appeared on the show's soundtrack album Ally McBeal: For Once in My Life.
