= Really Wanna Know You =

1981 single by Gary Wright

- Side A of the US single

Single by Gary Wright

from the album The Right Place
- B-side: "More Than a Heartache"
- Released: July 1981
- Genre: Soft rock, new wave
- Length: 4:15
- Label: Warner Bros. 49769
- Songwriters: Gary Wright; Ali Thomson
- Producers: Gary Wright; Dean Parks

Gary Wright singles chronology
"Touch and Gone" (1978)	"Really Wanna Know You" (1981)	"Heartbeat" (1981)

"Really Wanna Know You" is a 1981 song by Gary Wright that was a hit single in the U.S., reaching No. 16 on the Billboard Hot 100. It was taken from the album The Right Place. The song spent 17 weeks on the chart and became Wright's third biggest U.S. hit. It was his final charting single.

Billboard ranked "Really Wanna Know You" as the No. 96th biggest hit of 1981. In Canada, the song reached No. 14.

A music video was also produced for the song, which depicts Wright in a dream-like setting which includes a bedroom with a mysterious woman, and a futuristic junkyard full of trash and shopping carts, among other items.

== Chart performance ==
=== Weekly singles charts ===
Chart (1981)	Peak position
Australia (Kent Music Report)	49
Canada RPM Top Singles	14
New Zealand	39
U.S. Billboard Hot 100	16
U.S. Billboard Adult Contemporary	32
U.S. Billboard Mainstream Rock	17
U.S. Cash Box Top 100	19
U.S. Record World	23

=== Year-end charts ===
Chart (1981)	Rank
U.S. Billboard Hot 100	96
