= This Song =

- US picture sleeve

Single by George Harrison

from the album Thirty Three & 1/3
- B-side: "Learning How to Love You"
- Released: 15 November 1976
- Genre: Pop rock
- Length: 4:14 (album version); 3:45 (single edit)
- Label: Dark Horse
- Songwriter: George Harrison
- Producer: George Harrison with Tom Scott

George Harrison singles chronology
"This Guitar (Can't Keep from Crying)" (1975)	"This Song" (1976)	"Crackerbox Palace" (1977)

"This Song" is a song by English rock musician George Harrison from his 1976 album Thirty Three & 1/3. It was released as the first single from the album and reached number 25 on the American pop charts but failed to chart in the UK. Harrison wrote the song as a response to the copyright infringement suit launched against him over his early 1970s hit "My Sweet Lord". The lyrics use terminology associated with the court case and mention other song titles as a satirical comment on the notion of plagiarism in popular music.

== Composition and recording ==
George Harrison wrote "This Song" in March 1976 after spending a week in a New York courtroom, trying to convince a judge that his 1970 song "My Sweet Lord" did not infringe the copyright of the Chiffons' 1963 hit "He's So Fine". According to Harrison, the plaintiff's witnesses got ridiculously in-depth, breaking "My Sweet Lord" down into several melody lines, or "motifs", as they referred to them. The plaintiff's expert also drew up several charts with large musical notes on it to prove the point. Harrison said in his autobiography, I, Me, Mine, that after several days, he "started to believe that maybe they did own those notes".

Harrison wrote "This Song" to express his frustration at the infringement case in the form of an uptempo, piano-driven track. The song addresses the issue of musical plagiarism and also mocks serious analysis of a pop song. In his lyrics, Harrison states that the new composition came to him "unknowingly", discusses its key and main riff, and asserts that he has his "expert's" approval. With reference to Bright Tunes, the company that owned the copyright to "He's So Fine", he declares, "This tune has nothing 'Bright' about it".

In musicologist Thomas MacFarlane's description, Harrison includes "musical jokes" and "familiar musical phrases" to further convey his view of a pop song's originality. The opening riff recalls that of the Four Tops' "I Can't Help Myself (Sugar Pie Honey Bunch)", a similarity that Harrison soon acknowledges. He sings that it might be recognisable from his 1975 single "You"; other voices then interject, disagreeing over whether the song sounds more like "I Can't Help Myself" or Fontella Bass's "Rescue Me". The recording includes Billy Preston on piano and organ, a horn arrangement by Tom Scott, and Monty Python's Eric Idle providing the "ratbag" interjections about the song's originality.

== Release and reception ==
Writing for Goldmine magazine in January 2002, Dave Thompson described "This Song" as "a brilliantly constructed commentary on Harrison's more recent travails". Billboard described the track as "irresistible" due to its cheerfulness and the way "the words so cleverly play on the concept of trying to write an entertaining non-controversial song". Cash Box said "a jazzy piano and organ take off on the lead" and "a firey sax played by Tom Scott spits across the bridge." Record World said "What if every time you wrote a song you had to run it through a computer to test its originality? That's the theme here, inspired by George's legal rift. The bright sound could make it his biggest yet."

== Music video ==
Harrison directed a music video for the song, which was filmed in a Los Angeles courthouse and satirised the 1976 plagiarism hearing. The clip was first shown on the 20 November 1976 episode of Saturday Night Live hosted by Paul Simon, in which Harrison was a special musical guest. It features Harrison in a courtroom along with a cast of many of his friends (dressed up as the jury, bailiff, defence experts). Drummer Jim Keltner appears as the judge and the Rolling Stones' Ronnie Wood (dressed as a "Pepperpot" character) mimics Idle's falsetto words; Harrison's girlfriend (later wife), Olivia Arias, appears between the people of the jury. The clip ends with Harrison playing guitar, with one hand handcuffed to a courtroom guard, portrayed by Harry Nilsson.

Chicago radio station WLS, which gave "This Song" much airplay, ranked it as the 72nd most popular hit of 1977. It reached number 7 on their survey of 15 January 1977.

== Personnel ==
- George Harrison – vocals, electric guitars, tambourine, backing vocals
- Tom Scott – saxophones
- Billy Preston – piano, organ
- Willie Weeks – bass
- Alvin Taylor – drums
- Eric Idle – spoken voice

== Chart performance ==
=== Weekly charts ===
Chart (1976–77)	Peak position
Canadian RPM Adult Contemporary	45
Canadian RPM 100 Singles	30
Dutch Singles Chart	30
US Billboard Hot 100	25
US Cash Box Top 100 Singles	28

=== Year-end charts ===
Chart (1977)	Rank
Canadian RPM Top Singles	193
