= Crackerbox Palace =

- Dutch picture sleeve

Single by George Harrison

from the album Thirty Three & 1/3
- B-side: "Learning How to Love You"
- Released: 24 January 1977
- Genre: Rock, pop
- Length: 3:58
- Label: Dark Horse
- Songwriter: George Harrison
- Producer: George Harrison with Tom Scott

George Harrison singles chronology
"This Song" (1976)	"Crackerbox Palace" (1977)	"True Love" (1977)

"Crackerbox Palace" is the ninth track on George Harrison's 1976 album, Thirty Three & 1/3. The song was released as the second single from the album and reached number 19 on the American pop charts.

== History ==
The song was inspired by Harrison's serendipitous meeting with George Greif. At the 1975 Midem Music Festival, Harrison remarked to Greif that he resembled the late comedian Lord Buckley, whom Harrison had admired for many years. Greif, who had been Buckley's manager, invited Harrison to Buckley's old Los Angeles home, "Crackerbox Palace". Thinking that the phrase had the makings of a song, Harrison jotted the words "Crackerbox Palace" down on a cigarette pack, and later wrote the song. The song includes references to Greif ("I met a Mr. Greif") and to Lord Buckley ("know that the Lord is well and inside of you"). ("Lord" could be a double entendre referring as well to either the Lord God or Lord Krishna.)

Harrison says "It's twoo, it's twoo" during an instrumental break, a line said by Madeline Kahn's German seductress-for-hire character Lili Von Shtupp in the 1974 Mel Brooks comedy Blazing Saddles.

== Music video ==
A whimsical music video accompanied the single which was first shown on 20 November 1976 episode of Saturday Night Live. Directed by Monty Python's Eric Idle (who had a brief cameo in the video), the film featured Harrison, Neil Innes (as the carriage-pushing nanny/mother, a bathrobe-clad man with a duck on his head, and as a church authority), Harrison's future wife Olivia Arias, and various other friends, including Eric Clapton and Harrison's soon-to-be ex-wife and Clapton's soon-to-be wife, Pattie Boyd, in an array of wild costumes. The gnomes of Friar Park are also prominent. The film was shot in and around the grounds of Harrison's home, Friar Park, which Harrison had nicknamed "Crackerbox Palace" after Lord Buckley's home.

== Personnel ==
- George Harrison – vocals, slide guitars, acoustic guitar, synthesizer, handclaps, backing vocals
- Tom Scott – lyricon, saxophones
- Richard Tee – keyboards
- Willie Weeks – bass guitar
- Alvin Taylor – drums
- Emil Richards – marimba and xylophone

== Reception ==
Cash Box said that "Harrison's melodic guitar work is here complemented by shimmering lines from the synthesized sax of Tom Scott, whose influence in the production is strongly felt." Record World said that "a dreamy quality pervades the song and provides the hook that could send it to the top." Ultimate Classic Rock critic Nick DeRiso rates it as the best song on Thirty-Three & 1/3, calling it an "incredibly fun Top 20 hit".

== Chart performance ==
=== Weekly charts ===
Chart (1977)	Peak position
Australian Kent Music Report	78
Canadian RPM 100	19
Canadian RPM 100 Adult Contemporary	17
US Billboard Hot 100	19
US Billboard Adult Contemporary	20
US Cash Box Top 100	17

=== Year-end charts ===
Chart (1977)	Rank
Canadian RPM 100	150
US (Joel Whitburn's Pop Annual)	128
