= Headin' Home (Gary Wright album) =

Studio album by Gary Wright
- Released: February 23, 1979
- Recorded: 1978
- Studios: Davlen (North Hollywood); Cherokee (Hollywood); Star Pasture (Los Angeles)
- Genre: Soft rock
- Length: 40:38
- Label: Warner Bros.
- Producer: Gary Wright

Gary Wright chronology
Touch and Gone (1977)	Headin' Home (1979)	The Right Place (1981)

Singles from Headin' Home
- 1. "I'm the One Who'll Be by Your Side" Released: 1979

Headin' Home is the sixth solo album by American rock musician Gary Wright, released on February 23, 1979 by Warner Bros. Records.

== Critical reception ==
Professional ratings
Review scores
Source	Rating
AllMusic	3/5 stars
Music Week	2/4 stars

The Globe and Mail wrote that "the production is pure California—carefully textured, not a note out of place, bouncy and soulful without being crass or sweaty."

== Track listing ==
All tracks are written by Gary Wright, with additional writers noted.

Side one
No.	Title	Writer(s)	Length
1.	"Keep Love in Your Soul"	Jamie Quinn	4:55
2.	"Love's Awake Inside"		4:35
3.	"You Don't Own Me"		3:38
4.	"Moonbeams"		3:32
5.	"Stand"		3:52

Side two
No.	Title	Writer(s)	Length
1.	"I'm the One Who'll Be by Your Side"	Christina Wright	4:14
2.	"Follow Next to You"		4:35
3.	"I Can Feel You Cryin'"		4:37
4.	"Let Me Feel Your Love Again"		2:35
5.	"Love Is Why"	Lorna Wright	4:05
Total length:			40:38

== Personnel ==
==== Musicians ====
- Gary Wright – Moog bass (1–10), Clavinet (1, 3, 6, 8), Oberheim synthesizer (1, 4, 5, 7, 10), Minimoog (1, 4, 5–7, 10), Polymoog (2, 3, 6, 9), Orchestron horns (2, 9), synthesizer solo (2, 4, 5, 7–10), ARP strings (3, 4, 6), Yamaha CS-80 (4–8), Micromoog (4), Oberheim sequencer (6)
- Bobby Lyle – piano (1, 10), Fender Rhodes (2, 3, 7, 9)
- Jai Winding – ARP strings (2, 9), Oberheim synthesizer (2, 6, 9)
- Michael Boddicker – Polymoog (3, 6)
- Neil Larsen – Oberheim synthesizer (3)
- Gary Mielke – Oberheim programming
- Fred Tackett – rhythm guitar (1), guitar (3)
- Steve Lukather – guitar solo (1, 8), acoustic guitar (6)
- Buzz Feiten – acoustic guitar (2, 9), guitar (10)
- Roland Bautista – guitar (3)
- Hugh McCracken – rhythm guitar (8)
- Alan White – drums (1, 6, 10)
- Andy Newmark – drums (2, 3, 9)
- Jeff Porcaro – drums (4)
- Harvey Mason – drums (5, 7), percussion (5)
- Paulinho da Costa – percussion (1)
- Audie Watkins – percussion (1, 6, 10)
- Lenny Castro – percussion (2, 6, 9)
- Emil Richards – percussion (4, 10)
- Ralph Humphrey – percussion (10)
- Jim Horn – saxophone solo (1)
- David Crosby – harmony vocals (2, 9)
- Graham Nash – harmony vocals (2, 9)
- Michael McDonald – harmony vocals (6)
- Venetta Fields – backing vocals (3, 5, 8, 10)
- Sherlie Matthews – backing vocals (3, 5, 8, 10)
- Lorna Wright – backing vocals (3, 5, 8, 10)

==== Technical ====
- Produced by Gary Wright
- Engineered by John Haeny
- Assistant engineers – Paul Black, John Weaver (at Cherokee)
- Mastered by Ken Perry at Capitol Studios (Hollywood, CA)
- Keyboard technician – David Carroll, Above the Line Audio
- Design – Vartan/Rod Dyer, Inc.
- Photography – Nick Saxton and Peter Conn

== Charts ==
Chart (1979)	Peak position
US Billboard 200	147
