= Learning How to Love You =

- 1976 single face label

Single by George Harrison

from the album Thirty Three & 1/3
- A-side: "This Song" "Crackerbox Palace" (US)
- Released: 19 November 1976
- Studio: FPSHOT (Oxfordshire)
- Genre: Jazz-pop
- Length: 4:13
- Label: Dark Horse
- Songwriter: George Harrison
- Producer: George Harrison with Tom Scott

George Harrison singles chronology
"This Guitar (Can't Keep From Crying)" (1975)	"Learning How to Love You" (1976)	"Crackerbox Palace" (1977)

"Learning How to Love You" is a song by English musician George Harrison, released in 1976 as the closing track of his debut album on his Dark Horse record label, Thirty Three & 1/3. Harrison wrote the song for Herb Alpert, sometime singer and co-head of A&M Records, which at the time was the worldwide distributor for Dark Horse. Although the relationship with A&M soured due to Harrison's failure to deliver Thirty Three & 1/3 on schedule, resulting in litigation and a new distribution deal with Warner Bros. Records, Harrison still dedicated the song to Alpert in the album's liner notes.

Music critics note the influence of light jazz and soul in the composition, similar to the work of songwriter Burt Bacharach, and Harrison himself considered "Learning How to Love You" to be the best song he had written since his much-covered Beatles hit "Something". The recording features prominent Fender Rhodes piano from New York musician Richard Tee, and a horn and flute arrangement by Tom Scott. The song was also issued as the B-side of both "This Song" and "Crackerbox Palace".

== Background and composition ==
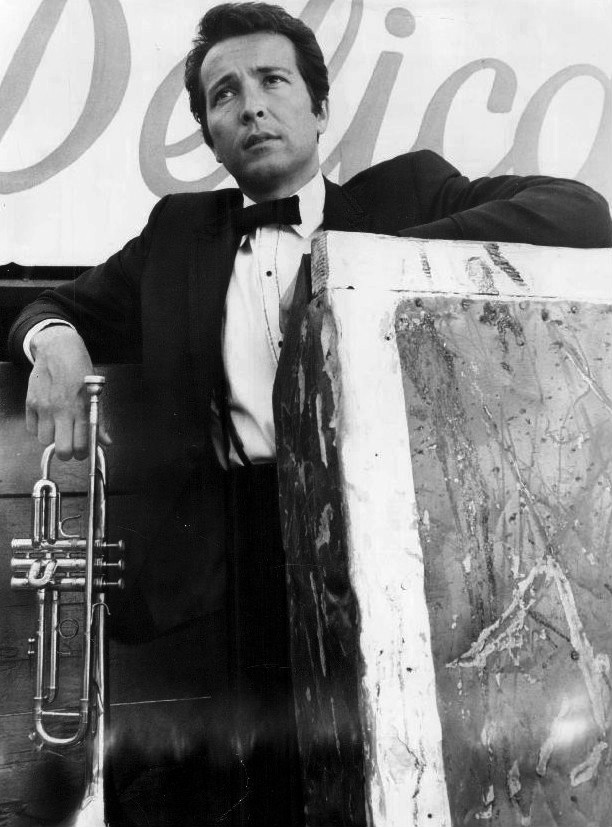
Trumpeter and co-founder of A&M Records, Herb Alpert, pictured in 1966

A&M Records, co-founded by American musician and composer Herb Alpert and Jerry Moss in 1962, had a reputation as an "artist-friendly" international record company, a factor that led to George Harrison agreeing terms with A&M to serve as distributors for his Dark Horse Records label in May 1974. Artists such as Ravi Shankar, Splinter, Stairsteps and Attitudes had all recorded for Dark Horse before Harrison was able to sign with A&M as a Dark Horse act himself, following the expiration of his contract with EMI-affiliated Apple Records in January 1976. Around that time, Harrison and Alpert were working in neighbouring studios at A&M's recording facility on La Brea Avenue, Hollywood, when Alpert asked him to provide a song for his forthcoming solo album. Although Alpert was best known as a trumpeter through his success with the Tijuana Brass, he had a US number 1 hit in 1968 with the original version of "This Guy's in Love with You", written by Burt Bacharach and lyricist Hal David. Harrison recalls in his 1980 autobiography, I, Me, Mine, that he admired Alpert's singing voice, especially on "This Guy's in Love with You", and so "thought I'd try and write a vocal [piece], something with that sort of mood". According to Eight Arms to Hold You authors Chip Madinger and Mark Easter, Harrison's working title for the new composition was "Herb's Tune".

In her introduction to the 2002 edition of I, Me, Mine, Olivia Harrison notes that it is her handwriting on the original song lyrics for "Learning How to Love You", which appear on an airmail envelope reproduced in the book. "I wrote the first line of lyrics down for him as he was working out the melody," she writes. "Then he took the pen from my hand and wrote words that would later guide him back to the thoughts he wanted to express." These lines became the first verse of what author Alan Clayson describes as a "discreetly jazzy" song about "unconditional spiritual love":

While all is still in the night
And silence starts its flow
Become or disbelieve me
Left alone with my heart
I'm learning how to love you.

In his book on the religious themes found in Harrison's songs, Dale Allison views these lyrics as another statement from the singer regarding the inadequacy of words, since it is silence that "can help conduct us to the Divine". (Note: Other Harrison songs that Allison sees as fitting the theme of words failing to express feelings, "especially love for another human being or love for God", include: "I Want to Tell You", "What Is Life", "The Day the World Gets 'Round", "That Is All", "Mystical One", "Never Get Over You" and "Pisces Fish".) Silence, Allison continues, is "a friend to be embraced" since "We have spiritual senses as well as physical senses ... and the former function best when the latter are temporarily shut down." The lyrics to the song's middle eight show darkness and stillness as "George's spiritual collaborators", freeing his attention from what Allison terms "this world of divertissement to the numinous world within his heart":

Love you like you may have never seen
Move you more ways than you have been
To a point in the time when we see so much more
Than the ground that we touch with each step so unsure.

Harrison biographer Ian Inglis notes that, despite the third verse's acknowledgement of "teardrops cloud[ing] the sight", "the singer is comfortable in the certainty of his emotions", declaring in the song's second chorus: "Left alone with my heart / I know that I can love you."

In terms of musical structure, Simon Leng, Harrison's musical biographer, identifies "Learning How to Love You" as marking "a new peak of sophistication" in its composer's ballad writing. Continuing in the model Harrison established with "Something" in 1969, and similar to his melody for early-1970s compositions such as "The Light That Has Lighted the World", (Note: Leng identifies "When Every Song Is Sung" and "Unknown Delight" as further examples of Harrison returning to the "Something" ballad mould.) the song's verse-choruses feature a chord pattern that descends one semitone on each bar within the root chord of F# major; but, Leng writes, the melody in "Learning How to Love You" is "longer and subtler" than that in "Something". The middle eight further reflects Harrison's "musical erudition", according to Leng, with its "subtle musical colours invoked by chic major ninth chords" common to jazz.

Harrison believed that a number of his post-1970 compositions were equal in quality to "Something", but that the latter song was more widely recognised because it was the Beatles who recorded it. He named "Learning How to Love You" and the similar-themed "Your Love Is Forever", from 1979's George Harrison album, as two compositions that he considered were as good as "Something".

== Recording ==
Rather than Alpert, it was Harrison who used the song for his next album, which he would title Thirty Three & 1/3, in honour of both the speed at which an LP record plays and his age when the album was due for release, in June 1976. Harrison's other activities delayed the start of recording until late spring that year, however, and sessions began on 24 May at FPSHOT, his home studio at Friar Park in Oxfordshire. Working with Tom Scott as his assistant producer, Harrison taped the basic track for "Learning How to Love You" with keyboard player Richard Tee, bassist Willie Weeks and drummer Alvin Taylor. While Scott and Weeks were regular contributors to Harrison's projects at this time, Tee came at Scott's recommendation, (Note: Like Harrison, Richard Tee had contributed to Scott's album New York Connection, recorded in August 1975.) and Taylor had impressed Harrison with his recent work on Stairsteps' 2nd Resurrection album. Progress on Thirty Three & 1/3 was then delayed until the end of the summer due to Harrison suffering a lengthy bout of hepatitis, brought about, he admitted, by excessive drinking. Of the little recording Harrison was able to do during this hiatus, Madinger and Easter write, he overdubbed an acoustic guitar solo on "Learning How to Love You". Later, Scott added a "neat jazz arrangement" for saxophones and flutes, and Harrison overdubbed vocals and assorted percussion. Leng also lists Attitudes singer/pianist David Foster as contributing further keyboards to the track.

The recording begins with Tee's jazz-inflected Fender Rhodes piano, which, along with Harrison's electric rhythm guitar, is prominent throughout the song and recalls Tee's work in New York with artists such as Paul Simon and Roberta Flack. Inglis describes the "cool, restrained" instrumentation on "Learning How to Love You" as evoking "the atmosphere of an intimate, sophisticated nightclub".

Harrison completed final mixing of the album on 13 September, nearly two months after he was contracted to deliver it to A&M Records in Los Angeles. Although the relationship between Harrison and the record company had traditionally been "all smiles", in Clayson's words, (Note: As well as bankrolling Harrison's label, A&M had allowed him to use their studios in Hollywood to finish his Dark Horse album in October 1974 and rehearse for his and Ravi Shankar's upcoming North American tour. Harrison also recorded most of his final album for Apple, Extra Texture, at A&M Studios during the spring of 1975.) Alpert and Moss had invested $3 million in Harrison's fellow Dark Horse signings and seen little in the way of financial returns. (Note: In its first two years of operation, Dark Horse Records' only significant commercial success was Splinter's debut album, The Place I Love, first released in September 1974, and the band's single "Costafine Town".) After realising that the 1974 contract prevented A&M from cross-collatoralising between Harrison as a solo artist and the Dark Horse acts, Alpert and Moss took legal action against him on 28 September, citing the late delivery of his first album on Dark Horse, and sued Harrison for $10 million. The news came three weeks after US district court judge Richard Owen had ruled against him in the long-running "My Sweet Lord"/"He's So Fine" plagiarism suit and Harrison admitted he was "astounded and saddened" by A&M's move. The issue was swiftly resolved through him returning his $1 million advance and taking Dark Horse's distribution to Warner Bros. Records, the announcement of which took place on 17 November.

== Release and reception ==
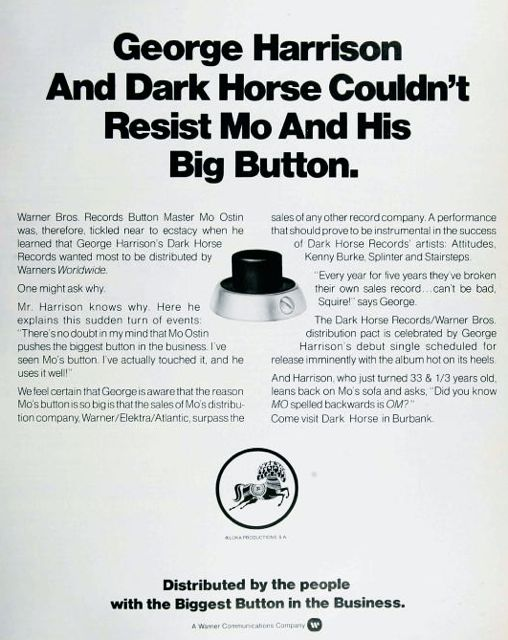
Billboard ad announcing Dark Horse's new partnership with Mo Ostin at Warner Bros. Records

Warner Bros. released Thirty Three & 1/3 on 19 November 1976 in Britain and 24 November in the United States. "Learning How to Love You" appeared as the tenth and final track, following the Lord Buckley-inspired "Crackerbox Palace". The song was also issued as the B-side to the album's first single, "This Song", which was Harrison's send-up of his court appearance in February at the plagiarism hearing, and to the follow-up single in the US, "Crackerbox Palace".

Particularly in America, music critics viewed Thirty Three & 1/3 as Harrison's strongest album since his post-Beatles debut, All Things Must Pass, and with Harrison participating in a dedicated promotional campaign for the first time, the consensus was, in the words of author Nicholas Schaffner, that "A&M's loss proved to be Warner Brothers' gain". Writing in his 1977 book The Beatles Forever, Schaffner praised the album's abundance of melodic compositions and the "light jazz overtones" of "Learning How to Love You", and concluded: "George with Thirty-three and a Third showed himself capable of producing excellent commercial music that conveys his deep spiritual convictions with subtlety and taste to those who wish to hear, without belaboring the point for those who don't." NME critic Bob Woffinden, who had been outspoken in his criticism of the spiritual message in Harrison's previous albums, similarly approved of these convictions now being expressed with a more "generous and open heart"; according to Woffinden, the fact that Harrison dedicated "Learning How to Love You" to Herb Alpert, despite the recent litigation with A&M Records, was "illustrative of a new spirit".

Like Schaffner, Beatles author Robert Rodriguez notes A&M's folly in missing out on Harrison's "strongest collection in years and possibly most commercial ever". Rodriguez describes "Learning How to Love You" as "perhaps Harrison's finest pure love song since 'Something'" and ranks his acoustic-guitar solo among "this ex-Fab's Top 5 all-time instrumental interludes". Simon Leng views the composition as one of Harrison's best love songs from the whole of his career and admires the recording as "[m]usically, lyrically, and vocally polished" with a "beautifully flowing" mid-song solo. Leng suggests that Harrison's former bandmate Paul McCartney "might have experienced a twinge of envy" when listening to the song. Having interviewed Harrison for Guitar World magazine in 1987, Rip Rense has since praised the guitar solo, along with those on tracks such as "The Light That Has Lighted the World" and the Beatles' "Fixing a Hole", as examples of how Harrison's playing displays "structure, syntax, and development" over "pyrotechnic flourishes". Rense adds: "These [guitar solos] are thoughtful and original, deceptively simple sounding, invested with feeling."

Reviewing Harrison's solo releases in 2004, for Blender magazine, Paul Du Noyer considered the song to be one of the album's two "standout tracks", along with "Crackerbox Palace". Harrison biographer Elliot Huntley views it as a successful attempt to write a Burt Bacharach-type song – "a sort of 'This Guy's in Love with You' for the 1970s" – and further evidence of Harrison's "mastery of the ballad form". In his book The Beatles Solo, former Mojo editor Mat Snow discusses the highlights of Thirty Three & 1/3 and concludes: "But perhaps best of all was 'Learning How to Love You,' a delicately serpentine melody full of tender yearning. It was a song from the heart." Guitar World editor Damian Fanelli includes the track's "beautiful steel-string solo" on his list of Harrison's ten best post-Beatles "Guitar Moments". By contrast, Nick DeRiso of Ultimate Classic Rock rates it as the worst song on Thirty-Three & 1/3, saying that it ends the album "on an oddly somnolent note".

Following the digital release of much of Harrison's catalogue in October 2007, an alternative mix of "Learning How to Love You" became available as an iTunes-exclusive download.

== Personnel ==
- George Harrison – vocals, electric guitar, acoustic guitar, claves, triangle, backing vocals
- Richard Tee – electric piano
- David Foster – organ
- Tom Scott – saxophones, flutes, brass, string and woodwind arrangements
- Willie Weeks – bass
- Alvin Taylor – drums

== Sources ==
- Dale C. Allison Jr., The Love There That's Sleeping: The Art and Spirituality of George Harrison, Continuum (New York, NY, 2006; ISBN 978-0-8264-1917-0).
- Keith Badman, The Beatles Diary Volume 2: After the Break-Up 1970–2001, Omnibus Press (London, 2001; ISBN 0-7119-8307-0).
- Roy Carr & Tony Tyler, The Beatles: An Illustrated Record, Trewin Copplestone Publishing (London, 1978; ISBN 0-450-04170-0).
- Harry Castleman & Walter J. Podrazik, All Together Now: The First Complete Beatles Discography 1961–1975, Ballantine Books (New York, NY, 1976; ISBN 0-345-25680-8).
- Alan Clayson, George Harrison, Sanctuary (London, 2003; ISBN 1-86074-489-3).
- The Editors of Rolling Stone, Harrison, Rolling Stone Press/Simon & Schuster (New York, NY, 2002; ISBN 0-7432-3581-9).
- George Harrison, I Me Mine, Chronicle Books (San Francisco, CA, 2002; ISBN 0-8118-3793-9).
- Elliot J. Huntley, Mystical One: George Harrison – After the Break-up of the Beatles, Guernica Editions (Toronto, ON, 2006; ISBN 1-55071-197-0).
- Ian Inglis, The Words and Music of George Harrison, Praeger (Santa Barbara, CA, 2010; ISBN 978-0-313-37532-3).
- Simon Leng, While My Guitar Gently Weeps: The Music of George Harrison, Hal Leonard (Milwaukee, WI, 2006; ISBN 1-4234-0609-5).
- Chip Madinger & Mark Easter, Eight Arms to Hold You: The Solo Beatles Compendium, 44.1 Productions (Chesterfield, MO, 2000; ISBN 0-615-11724-4).
- Robert Rodriguez, Fab Four FAQ 2.0: The Beatles' Solo Years, 1970–1980, Backbeat Books (Milwaukee, WI, 2010; ISBN 978-1-4165-9093-4).
- Nicholas Schaffner, The Beatles Forever, McGraw-Hill (New York, NY, 1978; ISBN 0-07-055087-5).
- Mat Snow, The Beatles Solo: The Illustrated Chronicles of John, Paul, George, and Ringo After The Beatles (Volume 3: George), Race Point Publishing (New York, NY, 2013; ISBN 978-1-937994-26-6).
- Bob Woffinden, The Beatles Apart, Proteus (London, 1981; ISBN 0-906071-89-5).
