= Ali Thomson =

Scottish singer-songwriter

Ali Thomson (born 1959 in Glasgow, Scotland) is a Scottish singer-songwriter. His brother is Dougie Thomson, of the Alan Bown Set and Supertramp. Ali began singing and playing piano in local bands and moved to London in the 1970s where he worked for Mountain Records as an office help hand.

Ali signed to A&M Records in the UK and recorded two albums. The first album was entitled Take a Little Rhythm peaking at #99 on the Billboard 200 on August 9, 1980. The title track was a hit in the US, peaking at No. 15 on the Billboard Hot 100 in the summer of 1980 and also peaking at No. 4 on the Adult Contemporary chart. The song also reached No. 10 on the Radio & Records chart and No. 12 in the Hitline chart in January 1980 on London's Capital Radio in the UK. The song reached No. 22 (2 weeks) and No. 37 AC in Canada.

A second single, "Live Every Minute", just missed the top 40, peaking at No. 42 on the Billboard Hot 100. In early 1981, "Foolish Child" (the lead single from his second album Deception Is an Art) peaked at No. 105, while the follow-up, "Safe and Warm", did not chart at all. Thomson also co-wrote Gary Wright's last hit, 1981's "Really Wanna Know You".

Thomson continues to work in the industry as a songwriter, writing tunes for artists such as A1, Brian Kennedy, Steps, and Lisa Stansfield.

== Discography ==
- Take a Little Rhythm (A&M Records, 1980) (#99 US)
- Deception Is an Art (A&M Records, 1981)
- Songs from the Playroom (P-Vine Records, 2019)
- The Last Rodeo (P-Vine Records, 2022)
