= Fire and Ice (1986 film) =

1986 German sports film

- Film poster
- German: Feuer und Eis
- Directed by: Willy Bogner Jr.
- Written by: Willy Bogner Jr.
- Narrated by: John Denver (English); Emil Steinberger (German)
- Cinematography: Peter Rohe; Willy Bogner, Jr.
- Music by: Gary Wright
- Distributed by: Neue Constantin
- Release date: January 16, 1987
- Country: Germany
- Box office: 1.5 million admissions (Germany)

Fire and Ice (German: Feuer und Eis) is a 1986 German sports film starring John Eaves and Suzy Chaffee, directed by Willy Bogner Jr. with narration by John Denver.

Singer Marietta Waters performed the title track Fire and Ice.

== Plot ==
John (John Eaves) and Suzy (Suzy Chaffee) meet while skiing in Aspen, Colorado. They run into each other again in New York and John follows her around the country.

== Cast ==
- Kelby Anno as Wind Surfer
- Philippe Bernard as Hangglider
- Scott Brooksbank as Skier
- Jan Bucher as Skier
- Suzy Chaffee as Suzy
- John Denver as Narrator (voice)
- John Eaves as Skier
- Masayoshi Hija as Cowboy
- Wolfgang Junginger as Skier
- Suzy Kay as Skier
- Wong Kong as Cowboy
- Gianfranco L'Amore as Crazy Skier
- Steve Link as Snow Surfer
- Ann McIntire as Skier
- Kathy Pelowski as Waitress
- Bob Salerno as Skier
- Jan Schwartz as Skier
- Matt Schweitzer as Wind Surfer
- Tom Sims as Snow Surfer
- Mike Waltze as Wind Surfer
- Jennifer Wilson as Ribbon Dancer

== Reception ==
The film was the fourth highest-grossing German film in West Germany for the year with admissions of 1,496,743.

== Critical reception ==
The New York Times, "If Fire and Ice were a James Bond movie, somebody would have blown up the spectacular scenery before the credits. Calling Spectre."

== Sequel ==
Fire and Ice had a 1990 sequel entitled, Fire, Ice and Dynamite.
