= Dream Weaver =

1975 single by Gary Wright

- Side A of the US single

Single by Gary Wright

from the album The Dream Weaver
- B-side: "Let It Out"
- Released: December 1975
- Recorded: 1975
- Genre: Soft rock; progressive pop
- Length: 4:17 (album version); 3:15 (single version)
- Label: Warner Bros.
- Songwriter: Gary Wright
- Producer: Gary Wright

Gary Wright singles chronology
"Two Faced Man" (1972)	"Dream Weaver" (1975)	"Love Is Alive" (1976)

"Dream Weaver" is a song by the American singer Gary Wright, released as the first single from his third studio album The Dream Weaver in December 1975.

== Origins and instrumentation ==
The track features Gary Wright on vocals and keyboards and Jim Keltner on drums. According to Wright, the song was inspired by Autobiography of a Yogi by Paramahansa Yogananda which was given to him by George Harrison. Yogananda's poem "God! God! God!" made reference to "the idea of the mind weaving dreams". The expression "Dream Weaver" was popularized by John Lennon in 1970 in his song "God", taken from his solo album John Lennon/Plastic Ono Band. This song depicts Lennon's declaration that he was the dream weaver of the 1960s, breaking away from the influences and dogmas that influenced his life.

All instrumentation was created using keyboards except for Keltner's percussion. Wright re-recorded "Dream Weaver" twice, first in 1986 (spelled "Dreamweaver" this time) for the Fire and Ice film soundtrack, then a longer version for the Wayne's World film soundtrack in 1992.

=== Personnel ===
- Gary Wright - lead vocals, ARP Solina String Ensemble, Minimoogs, drum machine
- David Foster - Fender Rhodes electric piano
- Jim Keltner - drums

Instrumental credits taken from Mixonline.

== Chart performance ==
In 1976, the song became a hit in the US; it peaked at #2 on the Billboard Hot 100. It was kept from #1 by both "December, 1963 (Oh, What a Night)" by The Four Seasons and "Disco Lady" by Johnnie Taylor. "Dream Weaver" did get to #1 on the Cashbox Top 100.

== Charts ==
=== Weekly singles charts ===
Chart (1975–1976)	Peak position
Australia (Kent Music Report)	24
Canada Top Singles (RPM)	1
Canada Adult Contemporary (RPM)	1
New Zealand (Recorded Music NZ)	31
US Billboard Hot 100	2
US Adult Contemporary (Billboard)	14
US Cash Box Top 100	1

=== Year-end charts ===
Chart (1976)	Rank
Canada (RPM)	24
US Billboard Hot 100	37
US Cash Box Top 100	17

=== Certifications ===
Region	Certification	Certified units/sales
United States (RIAA)	Gold	1,000,000^{^}
^{^} Shipments figures based on certification alone.

== In popular culture ==
The song has been heard in many films and television programs. According to Wes Craven, the song (and its keyboard intro/outro) inspired the concept behind the 1984 film A Nightmare on Elm Street. Wright re-recorded the song for the soundtrack of the 1992 film Wayne's World. The song is also featured in the 2026 video game Grand Theft Auto VI, on the in-game radio station Emotion 98.3.

== See also ==
- 1975 in music
