= Oberheim DS-2 =

Digital polyphonic music sequencer

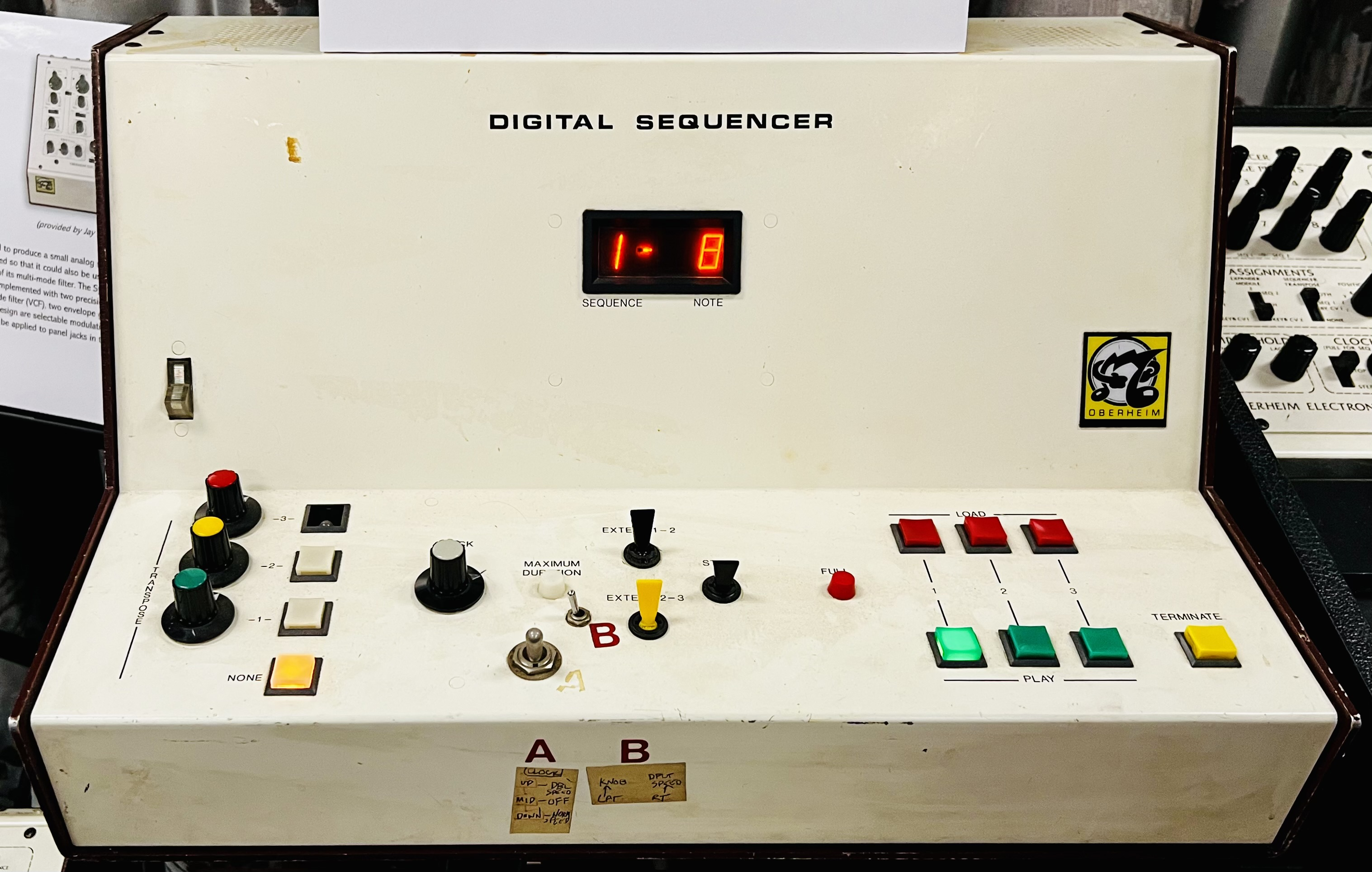
- Oberheim DS-2 - Digital sequencer
- Manufacturer: Oberheim Electronics
- Dates: 1973-1974

Technical specifications
- Polyphony: 1 note
- Timbrality: 1 part
- Synthesis type: Digital

Input/output

The Oberheim DS-2 is a pre-MIDI digital music sequencer. Designed and built in 1974 by Tom Oberheim, it is considered one of the first ever digital musical sequencers.

== Features ==
The DS-2 is capable of storing and sequencing 48 notes and provides a single channel of CV/Gate input and output. It can also be clocked externally. A later model, the DS-2a was capable of storing up to 144 notes.
