= The Dream Weaver =

Studio album by Gary Wright
- Released: July 4, 1975
- Recorded: Early 1975
- Studios: Sound Labs (Hollywood); Stronghold Sound Recorders (North Hollywood)
- Genres: Electronic; soft rock; synth-pop
- Length: 34:59
- Label: Warner Bros.
- Producer: Gary Wright

Gary Wright chronology
Benjamin – The Original Soundtrack of Willy Bogner's Motion Picture (1974)	The Dream Weaver (1975)	The Light of Smiles (1977)

Singles from The Dream Weaver
- 1. "Dream Weaver" Released: December 1975; 2. "Love Is Alive" Released: April 1976; 3. "Made to Love You" Released: September 1976

Professional ratings
Review scores
Source	Rating
AllMusic	4/5 stars
Christgau's Record Guide	C

The Dream Weaver is the third solo album by American singer and musician Gary Wright, released on July 4, 1975.

Dream Weaver was one of the first rock and roll albums to be performed mainly on electronic keyboards, and was described as "revolutionary" in this regard in a retrospective review by AllMusic. Wright later said he recorded the demos on keyboards and a drum machine, intending to hire a traditional rock band for the recording of the full album. But he later decided the keyboard-dominated demo sessions "sound[ed] good. They didn't really need guitars." The performers include David Foster, Bobby Lyle and Wright himself on keyboards, and Jim Keltner and Andy Newmark on drums. The track "Power of Love" features Ronnie Montrose on electric guitar.

The album made little impact upon first release but slowly gained attention, and The Dream Weaver eventually peaked at number 7 on the U.S. Billboard 200 chart in the spring of 1976. It was certified Gold in 1976, Platinum in 1986 and 2× Platinum in 1995. The album spawned two hit singles: "Dream Weaver" and "Love Is Alive" both peaked at number 2 on the Billboard Hot 100 singles chart.

== Track listing ==
All tracks are written by Gary Wright, with additional writers noted.

Side one
No.	Title	Lyrics	Length
1.	"Love Is Alive"		3:54
2.	"Let It Out"	Jamie Quinn	3:25
3.	"Can't Find the Judge"		3:24
4.	"Made to Love You"		3:45
5.	"Power of Love"		3:32

Side two
No.	Title	Lyrics	Length
6.	"Dream Weaver"		4:17
7.	"Blind Feeling"		4:45
8.	"Much Higher"		3:00
9.	"Feel for Me"	Tina Wright	4:58
Total length:			34:59

== Personnel ==
==== Musicians ====
- Gary Wright – lead vocals, backing vocals, Moog bass, Clavinet, Hammond organ, Fender Rhodes, Moog brass, ARP String Ensemble, woodwinds, special effects
- David Foster – Fender Rhodes, Hammond organ, ARP String Ensemble
- Bobby Lyle – Clavinet, Fender Rhodes
- Ronnie Montrose – electric guitar (5)
- Andy Newmark – drums
- Jim Keltner – drums
- Lorna Wright – backing vocals
- Betty Sweet – backing vocals
- David Pomeranz – backing vocals

==== Technical ====
- Produced by Gary Wright
- Engineered by Jay Lewis
- Mastered by Doug Sax at The Mastering Lab (Hollywood, CA)
- Title inspiration – Paramahansa Yogananda
- Art direction and design – Lockhart
- Photography – Norman Seeff
- Illustration – Ed Scarsbrick (airbrush) and Mick Haggerty (background)

== Charts ==
=== Weekly charts ===
Chart (1976-77)	Peak position
Australian Albums (Kent Music Report)	31
Canada Top Albums/CDs (RPM)	3
US Billboard 200	7

=== Year-end charts ===
Chart (1976)	Position
Canada Top Albums/CDs (RPM)	26
US Billboard 200	6

== Certifications ==
Region	Certification	Certified units/sales
United States (RIAA)	2× Platinum	2,000,000^{^}
^{^} Shipments figures based on certification alone.
