= Mike Harrison (album) =

Studio album by Mike Harrison
- Released: October 1971
- Studio: Island Studios, London W11
- Genre: Rock, pop
- Label: Island
- Producer: Mike Harrison

Mike Harrison chronology
Mike Harrison (1971)	Smokestack Lightning (1972)

Mike Harrison is the first solo album by Spooky Tooth principal lead singer Mike Harrison, released on Island Records in 1971.

== History and Critical Reaction ==
Mike Harrison was recorded and released after Spooky Tooth had broken up for the first time, following the release of their album The Last Puff in 1970. Harrison's backing band on the album was the Carlisle band Junkyard Angel. The band included Frank Kenyon, with whom Harrison had played in the V.I.P.s between 1963 and 1967, prior to co-founding Spooky Tooth. Another Member of Junkyard Angel, Ian Herbert, would later join Harrison as the bass player in a reformed version of Spooky Tooth, during the 1972-1973 period.

In 2017, the album was re-released as part of a two CD package containing Harrison's three solo albums.

== Track listing ==
1. "Mother Nature" (Peter Batey) - 2:05
2. "Call It a Day" (Peter Batey, Mike Harrison, Ian Herbert, Kevin Iverson) - 6:25
3. "Damian" (Mike Harrison, Ian Herbert) - 3:22
4. "Pain" (Ian Herbert, Kevin Iverson, Frank Kenyon) - 3:30
5. "Wait Until Morning" (Griffin, Harrison) - 4:26
6. "Lonely People" (Peter Batey) - 2:33
7. "Hard Headed Woman" (Cat Stevens) 6:36
8. "Here Comes The Queen" (Luther Grosvenor) - 2:29

== Personnel ==
- Mike Harrison - vocals, piano, harmonica, organ
- Kevin Iverson - drums, percussion, background vocals
- Peter Batey - bass, percussion
- Ian Herbert - guitar, piano, organ, vibes, background vocals
- Frank Kenyon - guitar, background vocals

with:

- Arthur Belcher - tenor saxophone on "Hard Headed Woman"
- Richard Digby Smith - engineer
