= I'll Keep It with Mine =

Bob Dylan song

Song by Bob Dylan

from the album Biograph
- Released: March 26, 1991
- Recorded: January 27, 1966
- Genre: Rock
- Length: 3:39
- Label: Columbia
- Songwriter: Bob Dylan
- Producer: Bob Johnston

"I'll Keep It With Mine"

Song by Nico

from the album Chelsea Girl
- Released: October 1967
- Recorded: April 4, 1967
- Studio: Mayfair Sound, New York City
- Length: 3:17
- Songwriter: Bob Dylan
- Producer: Tom Wilson

"I'll Keep It With Mine"

Single by Fairport Convention

from the album What We Did on Our Holidays
- B-side: "Fotheringay" (Sandy Denny)
- Released: July 1969
- Length: 3:01
- Label: A&M
- Songwriter: Bob Dylan
- Producer: Joe Boyd

Fairport Convention singles chronology
"Meet on the Ledge" (1968)	"I'll Keep It With Mine" (1969)	"Si Tu Dois Partir" (1969)

"I'll Keep It with Mine" is a song written by Bob Dylan in 1964, first released by folk singer Judy Collins as a single in 1965. Dylan attempted to record the song for his 1966 album Blonde on Blonde.

== Dylan's versions ==
Dylan recorded a vocal-and-piano demo of the song for publishing company M. Witmark & Sons in June 1964, which was released by Columbia in 2010 on The Bootleg Series Vol. 9: The Witmark Demos: 1962–1964.

In mid-January 1965, during sessions for the Bringing It All Back Home album, Dylan again recorded the song solo, on piano. This version, with the working title "Bank Account Blues", was released in 1985 on the Biograph retrospective. (The album notes contradictorily indicate that this performance was recorded in June 1964 and that it was recorded in January 1965. The latter is correct.)

A full-band rehearsal of the song, recorded during the early Blonde on Blonde sessions on January 27, 1966 (per album booklet), was released on The Bootleg Series Volumes 1–3. The rehearsal is rough and the recording starts well into the first verse, which is briefly interrupted by producer Bob Johnston on a talkback speaker, saying, "What you were doing".

During the seventh session for Blonde on Blonde – on February 15–16, 1966, at the Columbia Music Row Studios, Nashville, Tennessee – ten instrumental takes of the song were recorded. Takes 2, 4, 5, 6 and 7 are false starts, and takes 1 and 3 are interrupted. Dylan is not present on these recordings, as he was late to the session. While they waited, Johnston had the musicians lay down through instrumental takes of the song - presumably either as rehearsals or to have Dylan overdub his parts later. When Dylan arrived at the studio he opted instead to focus on "Sad Eyed Lady Of The Lowlands". The song was not revisited during the Nashville sessions.

Dylan can be seen performing the song on piano in the film 65 Revisited, which was made during his tour of England in May 1965.

=== Personnel for Dylan's recordings ===
The Bootleg Series version

- Bob Dylan: piano, vocal
- Robbie Robertson: guitar
- Al Kooper: organ
- Rick Danko: bass guitar
- Bobby Gregg: drums

Unreleased version

- Charlie McCoy: guitar
- Wayne Moss: guitar
- Joe South: bass
- Al Kooper: organ
- Hargus "Pig" Robbins: piano
- Kenneth Buttrey: drums

== Reception ==
Rolling Stone rated the song #41 on its list of 100 Greatest Bob Dylan Songs, calling it a "ballad of friendship" featuring "a sweet, plaintive vocal."

=== Cover versions ===
- Judy Collins released the first recording of the song on a 1965 single on Elektra Records, which never appeared on any of her albums. In the liner notes of Collins' 1993 Geffen Records album Just Like A Woman, a Dylan tribute, she mentions that Dylan told her that he'd written the song for her.
- Dylan showed the song to Warhol superstar Nico, who recorded and released a version on her 1967 album Chelsea Girl.
- It was covered by Fairport Convention and released in 1969 as a US-only (A&M) single, as well as on their album What We Did on Our Holidays.
- Charley D. & Milo, co-fronted by occultist Lon Milo DuQuette, recorded the song for their self-titled 1970 album.
- Spooky Tooth lead singer Mike Harrison included a version of the song on his third solo album Rainbow Rider, released in 1975.
- Susanna Hoffs recorded a version for the Rainy Day project. The music critic Everett True wrote in 2000 that Hoffs's vocal at the start of the third chorus was "perhaps the sultriest moment committed to vinyl".
- Marianne Faithfull recorded a cover of the song on her 1987 album Strange Weather.
- Suzie Ungerleider recorded it on her self-titled 2003 album Oh Susanna.
- New York band Rainer Maria covered this song on their 2006 album Catastrophe Keeps Us Together.
- A cover of it was recorded by the electronic pop-rock band Mobius Band's EP Love Will Reign Supreme.
- Bettie Serveert covered the song for the I Shot Andy Warhol soundtrack.
- Dean & Britta included two versions of it in 13 Most Beautiful: Songs for Andy Warhol's Screen Tests (2010).
- It was recorded by Denison Witmer on Subterranean Homesick Blues: A Tribute to Bob Dylan's 'Bringing It All Back Home' (2010).
- Michael C. Hall recorded a version of this song on the EP Belasco with the Hedwig and the Angry Inch house band Tits of Clay.
- Richard Barone recorded a version for his 2016 album Sorrows & Promises: Greenwich Village in the 1960s, with David Amram on piano.
- Blair Dunlop & Larkin Poe recorded a version for the 2013 album Killing Time on Rooksmere Records.
