= Hamburg Blues Band =

German blues rock band

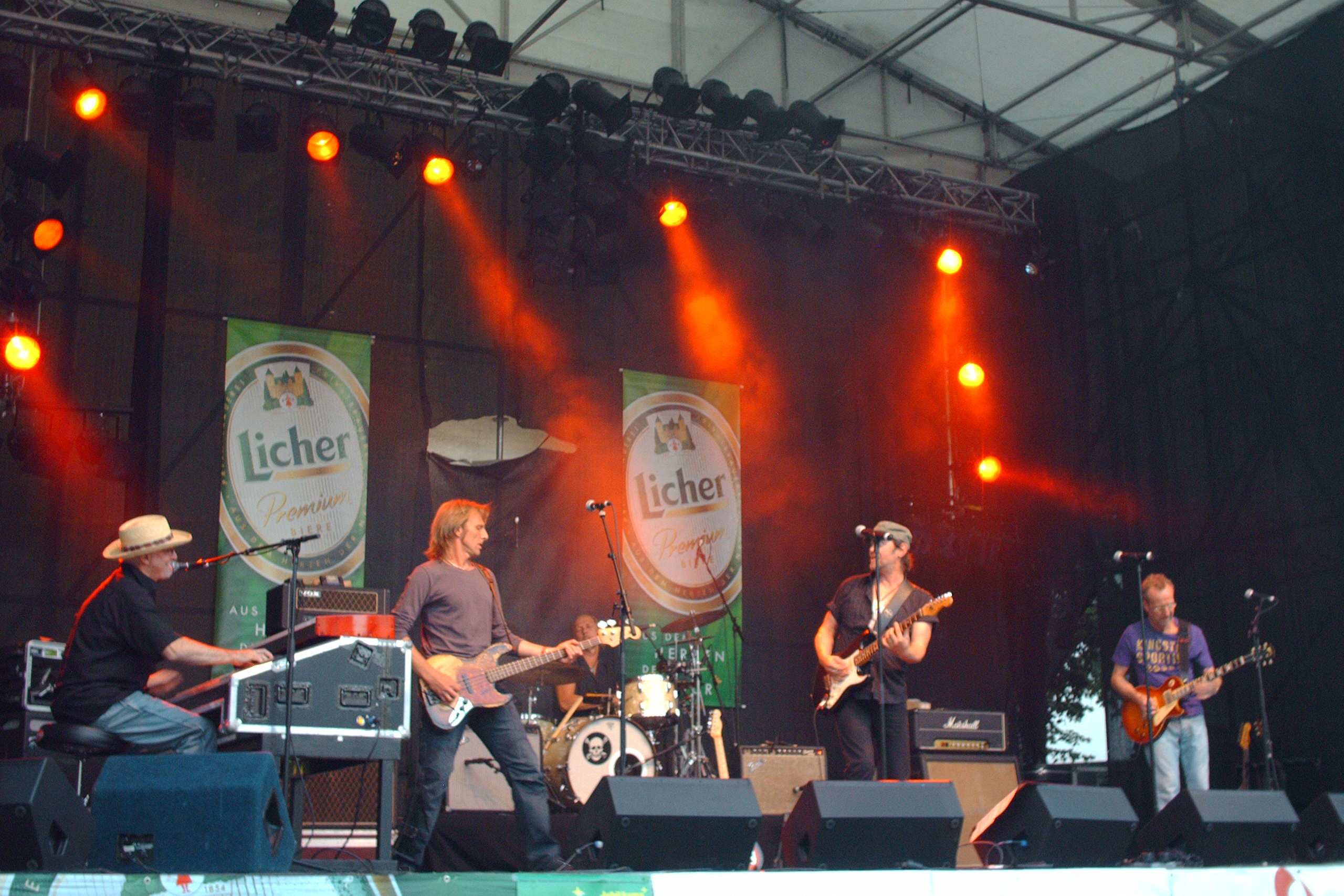
- Hamburg Blues Band at Stadtfest, Giessen, Germany, 2008

Background information
- Origin: Hamburg, Germany
- Genres: Blues, blues rock
- Years active: 1982–present
- Label: Ruf
- Members: Gert Lange; Miller Anderson; Hans Wallbaum; Michael "Bexi" Becker; Krissy Matthews
- Past members: Alex Conti; Clem Clempson; Adrian Askew; Dick Heckstall-Smith; Pete Brown
- Website: www.hamburgbluesband.de

The Hamburg Blues Band is a German blues rock band founded in Hamburg in 1982 by singer and rhythm guitarist Gert Lange. British musicians who have performed with the band include saxophonist Dick Heckstall-Smith, guitarists Clem Clempson and Miller Anderson, and songwriter Pete Brown.

== History ==
Gert Lange founded the Hamburg Blues Band in Hamburg in 1982, with Alex Conti on lead guitar.

British saxophonist Dick Heckstall-Smith, formerly of the Bluesbreakers and Colosseum, was a member from the early 1980s until his death from cancer on 17 December 2004. Throughout this period he divided his time between the Hamburg Blues Band and Colosseum. His death came shortly before the release of Live – On the Edge of a Knife, on which he is memorialized with the 18-minute track "Woza Nasu".

In summer 2006, the band anchored the Herzberg Blues Allstars at the Burg Herzberg Festival, with Chris Farlowe, Clem Clempson, Mike Harrison, and Pete Brown joining on stage. The performance was released as a double DVD by WDR Rockpalast.

Conti departed during the recording of the band's next studio album, requiring his guitar parts to be replaced. Clem Clempson, formerly of Humble Pie and Colosseum, completed the album as lead guitarist, joined by keyboardist Adrian Askew, who was also a member of Lake. The album, Mad Dog Blues, was released in January 2009, with lyrics by Pete Brown, who had written for Cream approximately forty years earlier. In 2011, the band toured with Chris Farlowe and Pete Brown.

Clempson and Askew both left in 2012; Askew joined Clempson's solo band. Miller Anderson, formerly of Keef Hartley and Savoy Brown, replaced Clempson on lead guitar. Bassist Michael "Bexi" Becker had also been a member of Lake.

In 2015, Krissy Matthews joined as lead guitarist after appearing with the band at the Musik am Noor festival.

== Discography ==
- 1989: Live featuring Dick Heckstall-Smith
- 1996: Real Stuff
- 1999: Rollin'
- 2001: Touch – Mike Harrison Meets the HBB
- 2005: Live – On the Edge of a Knife
- 2009: Mad Dog Blues
- 2013: Friends for a LIVEtime Vol. 1

=== Video releases ===
- 2006: Burg Herzberg Festival (WDR Rockpalast)
