= Rainbow Rider =

Studio album by Mike Harrison
- Released: 1975
- Studio: Goodear Studios
- Genre: Rock, pop
- Label: Island
- Producer: Chris Kimsey

Mike Harrison chronology
Smokestack Lightning (1972)	Rainbow Rider (1975)	Late Starter (2006)

Rainbow Rider is the third solo album by Mike Harrison, most notable as a principal lead singer for Spooky Tooth. It was released in 1975, on Island Records in North America, and Goodear Records in the United Kingdom. In addition to being part of Harrison's body of solo work, the album is notable as containing one of the earlier and comparatively rare recordings of the Bob Dylan song, "I'll Keep It With Mine", written in 1964 and recorded by Nico, Fairport Convention and Marianne Faithfull, among others. The album was recorded in Nashville, subsequent to Harrison's departure from Spooky Tooth, following the release of Witness (1973). The album features a number of Nashville's best known session musicians of that time, as well as Morgan Fisher, then of Mott the Hoople, and Mick Jones, formerly of Spooky Tooth and later founder of Foreigner. The album was produced and engineered by Chris Kimsey, whose reputation as a recording engineer had developed when he was the engineer on the Rolling Stones' Sticky Fingers, released in 1971. Rainbow Rider was one of Kimsey's first engagements as a producer. Still at an early stage of his career, Kimsey had produced Monkey Grip, the first Bill Wyman solo album, released in 1974, one year prior to Rainbow Rider.

"Maverick Woman Blues", with "You and Me" as the B-side, was released as a single.

As with Harrison's other solo works from 1971 to 1975, this album has been re-released on Compact Disc on Repertoire.

== Track listing ==
1. "Maverick Woman Blues" (Don Nix) - 3:42
2. "You and Me" (Will Jennings, Troy Seals) - 2:40
3. "I'll Keep It With Mine" (Bob Dylan) - 4:19
4. "Like a Road (Leading Home)" (Don Nix, Dan Penn) - 4:40
5. "We Can Work It Out" (John Lennon, Paul McCartney) - 3:24
6. "Okay Lay Lady Lay" (Luther Grosvenor, Harrison) - 6:40
7. "Easy" (Aitkin, Brown, Harrison) - 4:30
8. "Somewhere Over The Rainbow" (Harold Arlen, E.Y. Harburg) - 2:36
9. "Friend" (Arthur Belcher, Harrison) - 4:40

== Personnel ==
- Mike Harrison - vocals, harmonica
- Mick Jones - guitar
- Bob Cohen - guitar
- Kirk Lorange - slide guitar
- Norbert Putnam - bass
- Morgan Fisher - keyboards, synthesizer
- Arthur Belcher - saxophone
- The Memphis Horns - horns
- Corona Stage School - choir
- 20th Century Singers - choir
- Del Newman - string arrangements
- Kenneth Buttrey - drums, percussion

== Other Credits ==
- Chris Kimsey - Producer
