= Your Good Thing (Is About to End) =

Single by Lou Rawls

from the album The Way It Was: The Way It Is
- B-side: "Season of the Witch"
- Released: June 1969
- Genre: R&B
- Length: 4:30; 2:51 (7" version)
- Label: Capitol
- Songwriters: Isaac Hayes, David Porter
- Producer: David Axelrod

Lou Rawls singles chronology
"Down Here on the Ground" (1968)	"Your Good Thing (Is About to End)" (1969)	"I Can't Make It Alone" (1969)

"Your Good Thing (Is About to End)" is a song written by Isaac Hayes and David Porter. The song was originally recorded by Mable John in 1966, peaking at number 95 on the Billboard Hot 100 and number 6 on the R&B Charts.

== Lou Rawls recording ==
In 1969, a version was released as a single by Lou Rawls, from his album The Way It Was: The Way It Is. His version reached number 18 on the Billboard Hot 100, and number 3 on the Hot Rhythm and Blues Singles chart.

== Additional cover versions ==
"Your Good Thing (Is About to End)" has been recorded by various artists for over 50 years.

Year	Artist	Album
1970	Cold Blood	Sisyphus (Bomba)
1972	The Bar-Kays	Do You See What I See? (Stax)
1978	O. V. Wright	Bottom Line (Hi Records)
1979	Bonnie Raitt	The Glow (Warner Bros.)
1980	Captain & Tennille	Keeping Our Love Warm (Casablanca)
1990	Etta James	Stickin' to My Guns (Island)
1997	Boz Scaggs	Come on Home (Virgin Records)
2006	Mike Harrison	Late Starter (HALO Label)
2012	Whitney Shay	Soul Tonic (Self-released)
2014	Robert Cray	In My Soul (Provogue Records)
2016	Paul Young	Good Thing (New State Music/Baked Recordings)
