= Patricia Shakesby =

English actress and playwright (born 1938)

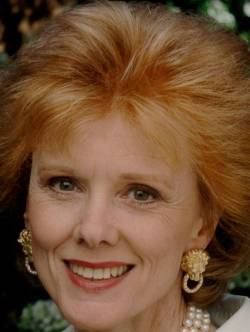
- Patricia Shakesby in the 1990s
- Born: Patricia Shakesby; 6 November 1939 (age 86); Cottingham, East Riding of Yorkshire, England
- Occupations: Actress, writer
- Years active: 1960–2010
- Known for: Susan Cunningham in Coronation Street; Polly Urquhart in Howard's Way; War and Peace; Sapphire & Steel; Casting the Runes; Yes Minister; Late Starter; The Flowering Cherry
- Spouse: Alan Purkiss (m 1997)

Patricia Shakesby (born 6 November 1939) is an English actress and playwright, best known for her role as Polly Urquhart in Howards' Way. She is also notable for being an original cast member of Coronation Street, in which she played Susan Cunningham, the first on-screen love interest of Ken Barlow.

== Early life and roles ==
Shakesby was born in Cottingham, East Riding of Yorkshire. She began her acting career in London’s West End, aged 18, playing the Sea Witch in Where the Rainbow Ends. Other West End appearances included Susie in Someone to Kill, Charlotte in Night of the Iguana, Felicity in The Real Inspector Hound and Helen in Suddenly at Home. For the Royal Shakespeare Company, Troilus and Cressida, Hamlet, Romeo and Juliet, The Merchant of Venice, The Love-Girl and the Innocent and La Ronde.

Shakesby was a member of the original cast of Coronation Street playing Suzan Cunningham for twelve episodes. In 1972, Shakesby appeared alongside Anthony Hopkins in the television series War and Peace, playing Vera Rostova. Between 1985 and 1990, she appeared in six series of the BBC television series Howard's Way, playing Polly Urquhart. Her many other television credits include Hancock's Half Hour, Dixon of Dock Green, Z-Cars, The Borderers, Late Starter, The Liver Birds, The Likely Lads, Sapphire & Steel, Casting the Runes and Yes Minister.

She wrote a play, The Lady of the Abbey, based on the life of the wife of Robert Fitzhamon, who founded Tewkesbury Abbey.

== Personal life ==
Shakesby married Alan Purkiss in 1997. The couple live in Gloucestershire. She won an award for playing the best drunk on television; however, Shakesby is teetotal, as alcohol gives her a migraine.

== Filmography ==
=== Film ===
Year	Title	Role	Notes
1962	She Knows Y'Know	Valerie	Early film role

=== Television ===
Year	Title	Role	Notes
1960–1961	Coronation Street	Susan Cunningham	Original cast member; 12 episodes
1965	Emergency-Ward 10	Joan Barry	2 episodes
1969	Detective	Mrs. Grange	1 episode
1969	The Inside Man	Vera Kaczka	1 episode
1970	The Borderers	Anne Michie	1 episode
1971	Doctor in the House	Nurse	1 episode
1971	On the Buses	Nurse	1 episode
1971	The Liver Birds	Jean Pike	1 episode
1971	The Fenn Street Gang	Nurse	1 episode
1972	War and Peace	Vera Rostova	4 episodes
1979	ITV Playhouse	Elise Marriott	1 episode
1980	Yes Minister	Mandy (Secretary)	1 episode
1981	Sapphire & Steel	Anne Shaw	6 episodes
1985	Late Starter	Jane Bourne	3 episodes
1985–1989	Howard's Way	Polly Urquhart	54 episodes

== Select stage roles ==
- 1960, Sea Witch, Where the Rainbow Ends at the West End
- 1960s, Susie, Someone to Kill at the West End
- 1960s, Charlotte, Night of the Iguana at the West End
- 1960s, Felicity, The Real Inspector Hound at the West End
- 1960s, Annie, When We Are Married in repertory
- 1971–72, Helen, Suddenly at Home at the Fortune Theatre
- 1970s, Constance, She Stoops to Conquer in repertory
- 1970s, Cordelia, King Lear in repertory
- 1970s, Miranda, The Tempest in repertory
- 1970s, The Princess of France, Love's Labour's Lost in repertory
- 1970s, Titania, A Midsummer Night's Dream in repertory
- 1970s, Olivia, Twelfth Night in repertory
- 1970s, Clara, They Came to a City in repertory
- 1970s, Edna, An Inspector Calls in repertory
- 1970s, Ann, Man and Superman in repertory
- 1970s, Amanda, Private Lives in repertory
- 1970s, Fiona, How the Other Half Loves in repertory
- 1970s, Constance, The Constant Wife in repertory
- 1970s, Do Not Disturb in repertory
- 1970s, Linda, Move Over Mrs. Markham in repertory
- 1980s, The Merchant of Venice - the Royal Shakespeare Company
- 1980s, Troilus and Cressida - the Royal Shakespeare Company
- 1980s, Romeo and Juliet - the Royal Shakespeare Company
- 1980s, Hamlet - the Royal Shakespeare Company
- 1980s, Love Girl and the Innocent - the Royal Shakespeare Company
- 1980s, La Ronde - the Royal Shakespeare Company
- 1980s, The Wife, The Seven Year Itch on UK tour
- 1980s, The Spin of the Wheel on UK tour
- 1980s, Goodnight Mrs. Puffin on UK tour
- 1980s, Dead of Night on UK tour
- 1990s, Mam, A Prayer for Wings at Theatre Clwyd
- 1990s, Elsie, Laburnum Grove in repertory
- 1990s, Hippolyta, The Rape of the Belt in repertory
- 1990s, The Heiress on UK tour
- 1990s, Straight and Narrow on UK tour
- 1990s, Queen Elizabeth, Shadow in the Sun (two-hander) on UK tour
- 1980s–1990s, Various plays in productions staged in Vienna, Frankfurt, and Zurich
