= Supernatural Fairy Tales =

Studio album by Art
- Released: November 1967
- Genre: Psychedelic rock
- Label: Island
- Producer: Guy Stevens

Singles from Supernatural Fairy Tales
- 1. "What's That Sound (For What It's Worth)"

Professional ratings
Review scores
Source	Rating
Allmusic	3/5 stars

Supernatural Fairy Tales is the only album by Art, who were formerly known as The V.I.P.'s. The album contains mostly band compositions plus a cover of The Young Rascals' "Come on Up" and Buffalo Springfield's "What's That Sound" ("For What It's Worth"). Unusual for 1967, the album was issued in mono only; the six bonus tracks on the CD release have been mixed into stereo.

Shortly after this album's release the band dissolved, with all four musicians of the final line-up forming the band Spooky Tooth later in 1967 with the American musician Gary Wright.

== Track listing ==
Except where noted, all songs written by Luther Grosvenor, Mike Harrison, Mike Kellie and Greg Ridley.

=== Side one ===
1. "I Think I'm Going Weird" - 3:21
2. "What's That Sound" - (Stephen Stills) - 2:41
3. "African Thing" - 4:06
4. "Room with a View" - 3:40
5. "Flying Anchors" - 2:43
6. "Supernatural Fairy Tale" - 3:36

=== Side two ===
1. "Love Is Real" - 3:19
2. "Come on Up" (Felix Cavaliere) - 3:01
3. "Brothers, Dads and Mothers" - 3:02
4. "Talkin' to Myself" - 1:41
5. "Alive Not Dead" - 2:14
6. "Rome Take Away Three" - 2:59

=== Bonus tracks ===
1. "Love is Real"
2. "I Think I'm Going Weird"
3. "Room With a View"
4. "Flying Anchors"
5. "Supernatural Fairy Tales"
6. "Talkin' to Myself"

== Personnel ==
Art

- Mike Harrison – vocals, piano
- Luther Grosvenor – guitars, vocals
- Greg Ridley – bass
- Mike Kellie – drums

Technical

- Chris Blackwell - production supervision
- Hapshash and the Coloured Coat - sleeve design
