= Alex Conti =

German guitarist

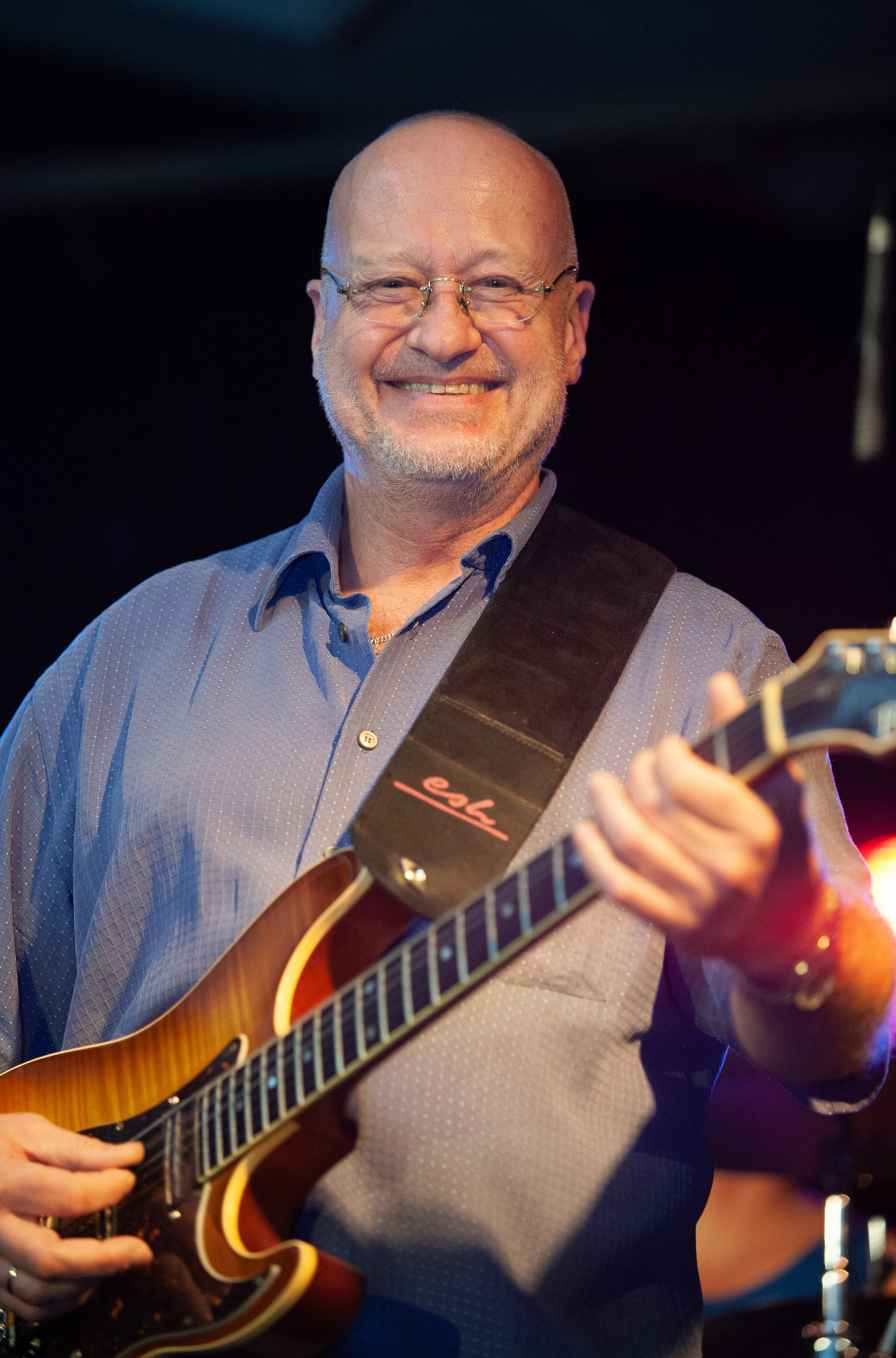

Background information
- Born: Alexander Conti; April 2, 1952 (age 74)
- Instrument: Guitar
- Years active: 1969–present
- Member of: Lake
- Formerly of: Atlantis
- Website: https://www.alexconti.de/

Alex Conti (born 2 April 1952) is a German guitarist.

== Biography ==
Alex Conti was born in Berlin. At the age of 17 he was already a professional musician. In 1973, he went to England for one year and played with Curly Curve. In 1974, he replaced Dieter Bornschlegel as guitarist of Atlantis. During his time with Atlantis he was involved in the recording of the two albums Ooh Baby and Atlantis Live. He also toured the US with the band as support band for Aerosmith and Lynyrd Skynyrd in 1975. Conti then went on to play with Lake and recorded their debut album with them. The band was also successful in the US and toured there several times in 1977 and 1978, partly together with Neil Young and Lynyrd Skynyrd. Conti left Lake in 1980 and after releasing two solo albums in 1981 and 1984 he joined the band Elephant from Hamburg. In 1986 and 1987, he joined Herwig Mitteregger on his albums Immer mehr and Jedesmal; in 1993 he accompanied him on tour. The next collaboration followed in 1997 for the album Aus der Stille and a tour of the same name.

Between 1990 and 1994 Conti led his own band Rosebud with which he recorded three albums. Since 1992 he has been playing in the Hamburg Blues Band with which he played over 1000 gigs. In 1997 he recorded an album with the former Atlantis singer Inga Rumpf. In 2000, Conti recorded titles from the 1960s and 1970s with musicians Frank Diez, Colin Hodgkinson, Tony Hicks, Wolfgang Dalheimer and Jon Smith - but they were only released in 2008.

In 2003, Conti was involved in the re-founding of Lake, went on tour with the band and eventually recorded the album The Blast of Silence with them in 2005. Together with Richie Arndt, Gregor Hilden and Henrik Freischlader Conti was involved in the production of the album Rorymania (2006). In 2009, he recorded the CD Kaleidoscopia with Swiss musician Beatnik. In 2010, he released his first instrumental album Shetar. Lake again accompanied Lynyrd Skynyrd on tour in 2010, this time in Germany. A joint project with blues guitarists Timo Gross and Richie Arndt resulted in the recording of the album The Vineyard Sessions Vol. II.; this album was nominated for the German Record Critics' Award.

== Recordings (selection) ==
With Atlantis:

- Ooh Baby (1974)

With Lake:

- Lake (1976)
- Lake II (1978)
- Paradise Island (1979)
- Ouch! (1980)
- The Blast of Silence (2005)
- Freedom (2012)
- Wings of Freedom (2014)

With Herwig Mitteregger:

- Immer mehr (1985)
- Jedesmal (1987)
- Aus der Stille (1997)

With Rosebud:

- Rosebud (1989)
- San Simeon (1993)
- Keep Smiling... (1993)

With Rockship and Inga Rumpf

- Rough enough (1997)

With Hamburg Blues Band:

- Real Stuff
- Rollin'
- Touch
- Live On The Edge of a Knife

With Richie Arndt:

- Rorymania (2007)

With Beatnik:

- Kaleidoscopia (2008)

With Richie Arndt and Timo Gross:

- The Vineyard Sessions Vol. II (2010)

Solo:

- Conti (album 1982)
- Continued (album 1984)
- Shetar (album 2010)
