= Smokestack Lightning (album) =

Studio album by Mike Harrison
- Released: November 1972
- Studio: Muscle Shoals Sound Studio, Sheffield, Alabama
- Genre: Rock, pop
- Label: Island
- Producer: Mike Harrison, Chris Blackwell

Mike Harrison chronology
Mike Harrison (1971)	Smokestack Lightning (1972)	Rainbow Rider (1975)

Smokestack Lightning is the second solo album by Mike Harrison, most notable as a principal lead singer for Spooky Tooth. The album was released on Island Records in 1972 and was co-produced by Chris Blackwell and Mike Harrison. The album was recorded at the Muscle Shoals Sound Studio in Alabama with the Muscle Shoals Rhythm Section.

== Track listing ==
1. "Tears" (Jimmy Stevens) - 4:12
2. "Paid My Dues" (Stevens) - 4:19
3. "What a Price" (Murphy Maddux, Jack Jessup, Fats Domino) - 5:52
4. "Wanna Be Free" (Joe Tex) - 4:14
5. "Turning Over" (Harrison, Luther Grosvenor) - 6:31
6. "Smokestack Lightning" (Chester Burnett) - 12:28

== Personnel ==
- Mike Harrison - harmonica, vocals
- Pete Carr - guitar
- Jimmy Johnson - guitar
- Wayne Perkins - slide guitar
- Luther Grosvenor - acoustic guitar
- Barry Beckett - keyboards
- Clayton Ivey - keyboards
- David Hood - bass
- Roger Hawkins - drums
- Harrison Calloway - trumpet
- Mike Stacey - trumpet
- Harvey Thompson - tenor saxophone
- Ronald Eades - baritone saxophone
- Charles Rose - trombone

== Other Credits ==
- Chris Blackwell - Co-producer
- Mike Harrison - Co-producer
