= Late Starter =

Studio album by Mike Harrison
- Released: 2006
- Label: Halo
- Producer: Mike Harrison, Mark Stevens

Mike Harrison chronology
Rainbow Rider (1975)	Late Starter (2006)

Late Starter is the fourth solo album released in 2006 by Mike Harrison, best known as a principal lead vocalist of Spooky Tooth. It is Harrison's first solo album in over thirty years, following the release of Rainbow Rider in 1975.

== History and Critical Reception ==
The album came about following Harrison's engagement with the Hamburg Blues Band, which commenced in 1999. Michael Maslen, who owned Halo Records and was a Spooky Tooth fan, heard Harrison with the Hamburg Blues Band and persuaded Harrison to record another solo album.

The album is primarily a collection of soul and blues covers, including "Sinner's Prayer", a song by Lowell Fulson and Lloyd Glenn that had most recently been covered two years earlier, on Ray Charles' final studio album, Genius Loves Company. To be more consistent with the history of much of what they were recording, Maslen and Harrison decided to record the album in analogue format.

The album was well received. According to one reviewer, "This is an album haunted by unspoken promises and soulful regret, where hearts are betrayed by love's sweet delusion and sinners pray for forgiveness, delivered in a voice to shatter the strongest of hearts. He might be bloodied by his past, but he's vocally unbowed." Another reviewer commented that "...Harrison has the balls and ballast to not only pay tribute to the likes of Otis Redding and Etta James, but paint their musical fireplaces with his own vocal colour. Harrison’s rasping, yet soulfully blue, voice is perfect for Night Time, Your Good Thing Is About To End and I’ve Got Dreams To Remember. It’s an album of warm surprise for those who recall when Harrison was dubbed ‘the white Ray Charles’ (he really gets his hand into the glove of the master’s Drown In My Own Tears). The gospel shout of Let’s Go Get Stoned is also a winner, showing that Harrison has still got it what it takes."

== Track listing ==
1. "Out of the Rain" (Tony Joe White)
2. "A Fool in Love" (Frankie Miller)
3. "Jealous Kind" (Delbert McClinton)
4. "Come Back Baby" (Ray Charles)
5. "I Can Give You Everything" (Terry Anderson)
6. "Don't Touch Me" (Hank Cochran)
7. "You Were Never Mine" (McClinton, Gary Nicholson, Benmont Tench)
8. "Night Time" (Roosevelt Sykes)
9. "Your Good Thing Is About To End" (Isaac Hayes, David Porter)
10. "The Rock" (Jim Varsos)
11. "Sinner's Prayer" (Lowell Fulson, Lloyd Glenn)
12. "Drown In My Own Tears" (Henry Glover)
13. "Let's Go Get Stoned" (Ashford and Simpson, Jo Armstead)
14. "I've Got Dreams to Remember" (Otis Redding)

== Credits ==
- Lead Vocals – Mike Harrison
- Bass, Backing Vocals – Trotter Schmidt
- Drums, Percussion, Backing Vocals –Hans Wallbaum
- Guitar, Backing Vocals – Ralf Lehmann
- Organ, Backing Vocals – Axel Fuhrmann
- Piano, Backing Vocals – Mischka
- Backing Vocals – Rietta Austin
- Recorded at The Grange Studio
- Engineer – Dave Williams
- Produced by Mike Harrison and Mark Stevens
- Executive Producer - Michael Maslen
