= The Way It Was =

The Way It Was may refer to:

- The Way It Was (TV series), a 1974–1978 American sports series
- The Way It Was (album), by Parachute, 2011
- "The Way It Was", a song by the Bee Gees from Children of the World, 1976
- "The Way It Was" (The Killers song), 2012
- "The Way It Was", a song by the Backstreet Boys from DNA, 2019

== See also ==
- The Way It Was, The Way It Is, a 1969 album by Lou Rawls
- The Way It Is (disambiguation)
- The Way I Remember It (disambiguation)
