= Lake II =

Studio album by Lake
- Released: 1978
- Genre: rock, pop
- Label: CBS
- Producer: Detlef Petersen, Lake

Lake chronology
Lake (1976)	Lake II (1978)	Paradise Island (1979)

Professional ratings
Review scores
Source	Rating
Allmusic	link

Lake II is the second studio album by Lake, released in 1978.

== Track listing ==
All tracks written by Detlef Petersen and James Hopkins-Harrison except as indicated

=== Side One ===
1. "Welcome to the West" - 5:07
2. "See Them Glow" - 4:59
3. "Letters of Love"- 3:40
4. "Red Lake" (J. Hopkins-Harrison, Geoffrey Peacey) - 4:57 (background vocal: Beach Boy Carl Wilson)
5. "Love's the Jailor"(*) - 4:29

(*)This is the correct title per the original LP release; later CD releases have it as "Love's a Jailer".

=== Side Two ===
1. "Lost by the Wayside" (J. Hopkins-Harrison, Geoffrey Peacey) - 4:25
2. "Highway 216" - 3:37
3. "Angel in Disguise" - 4:28
4. "Scoobie Doobies" (J. Hopkins-Harrison, Geoffrey Peacey) - 7:44

== Personnel ==
- Dieter Ahrendt - drums and percussion
- Alex Conti - guitar and vocals
- James Hopkins-Harrison - lead vocals
- Geoffrey Peacey - keyboards, vocals, and guitar
- Detlef Petersen - keyboards and vocals
- Martin Tiefensee - bass guitar

Produced by Detlef Petersen and Lake
Engineered by Geoffrey Peacey
Recorded at Russl Studios, Hamburg, Rockfield Studios, South Wales, Caribou Ranch, Colorado
String arrangements on "Love's the Jailor" by Peter Hecht
Mixed at Caribou Ranch, Colorado, and Russl Studios, Hamburg
Cover illustration by James McMullan
Design by Paula Scher

LP: Columbia Records JC 35289
CD: Renaissance RMED0126
