= Cross Purpose =

Studio album by Spooky Tooth
- Released: 23 February 1999
- Recorded: 22 July 1997 – 8 November 1998
- Length: 42:36
- Labels: Brilliant Recording Company, USA
- Producers: Chris Stainton, Chris Blackwell

Spooky Tooth chronology
The Mirror (1974)	Cross Purpose (1999)

Cross Purpose is the eighth and final studio album by Spooky Tooth, released on Ruf Records in 1999. It was the band's first album in 25 years, following The Mirror, released in 1974.

== History ==
The album was initially planned in 1997, when three tracks ("How", "Kiss it Better" and "Sunshine") were recorded by Harrison, Mike Kellie, Luther Grosvenor and Greg Ridley in England. The project then became stalled due to the distances between band members. The songs were originally to be released in 1998 as part of the album tentatively called Sunshine, which would have combined the three tracks with a 1968 BBC concert and an unreleased track from Deep Feeling, a 1960s band with which both Luther Grosvenor and Dave Mason had been associated. Instead, the owners of Ruf Records heard the three new tracks and persuaded the band to record more new material. Ruf Records financed the costs of relocating the band to record at Andapoe Sound in Weimar, Germany, where seven additional songs were recorded in September 1998. The album was released in Europe and the United States in February 1999.

== Reception ==
Professional ratings
Review scores
Source	Rating
AllMusic	3/5 stars

In their retrospective review, AllMusic assessed the album's material as "not quite up to the level of the group's best", while noting that the band's sound is much the same as it was before their original breakup. They concluded the album to be of interest to fans of the group but not to casual listeners.

== Track listing ==
1. "That Was Only Yesterday" (Gary Wright) – 4:30
2. "Tears (Behind My Eyes)" (Reed) – 5:02
3. "Throw Me a Line" (Dolan, Luther Grosvenor) – 3:15
4. "It's You Girl (Message to Deborah)" (Greg Ridley) – 3:30
5. "Love Is Real" (Mike Harrison) – 5:51
6. "Sunshine" (Karl Wallinger) – 4:31
7. "How" (Mike Kellie) – 4:48
8. "Send Me Some Lovin'" (Marascalco, Price) – 2:35
9. "I Can't Believe" (Traditional) – 4:12
10. "Kiss It Better" (Grosvenor, Harrison, Kellie) – 4:22

== Personnel ==
Spooky Tooth

- Mike Harrison – vocals, keyboards
- Luther Grosvenor – guitar
- Greg Ridley – bass
- Mike Kellie – drums

Additional musicians

- Dave Moore – keyboards
- Matthias Bätzel – keyboards
- Mark Feltham – harmonica
