= The Way I Remember It =

The Way I Remember It may refer to:

- The Way I Remember It, 1991 autobiography of the mathematician Walter Rudin
- The Way I Remember It, 2010 album by country music singer Teea Goans
- "The Way I Remember It", a song from the Trent Willmon album Broken In

== See also ==
- "That's the Way I Remember It", a song from the Garth Brooks album Greatest Hits
- The Way It Was (disambiguation)
