= Lake (album) =

- North American cover design (Columbia)

Studio album by Lake
- Released: 1976
- Recorded: 1976
- Studio: Sawmills Studio, Cornwall; Maschen Studio and Peer Studio, Hamburg
- Genre: Rock, pop
- Length: 37:20
- Label: CBS
- Producer: Detlef Petersen

Lake chronology
Lake (1976)	Lake II (1978)

Professional ratings
Review scores
Source	Rating
Allmusic	4.5/5 stars

Lake is the first studio album by Lake, released in Germany in 1976 and the USA in 1977. The track "Time Bomb" was the band's highest charting single of their career. It reached #83 in the USA in November 1977. It reached #91 in Canada in December 1977.

== Track listing ==
All tracks written by Detlef Petersen and James Hopkins-Harrison except as indicated.

=== Side One ===
1. "On the Run" - 4:06
2. "Sorry to Say" - 3:05
3. "Time Bomb" (James Hopkins-Harrison, Geoffrey Peacey) - 3:16
4. "Chasing Colours" - 3:47
5. "Do I Love You" - 4:05

=== Side Two ===
1. "Key to the Rhyme" - 4:34
2. "Jesus Came Down" - 3:42
3. "Between the Lines" (D. Petersen, J. Hopkins-Harrison, G. Peacey, Alex Conti, Martin Tiefensee, Dieter Ahrendt) - 10:22

The CD release of the album is a "two albums on one CD" release, combined with their third album Paradise Island.

== Personnel ==
- James Hopkins-Harrison - lead and backing vocals
- Alex Conti - guitar, vocals
- Geoffrey Peacey - keyboards, vocals, guitar
- Detlef Petersen - keyboards, vocals
- Martin Tiefensee - bass guitar
- Dieter Ahrendt - drums, percussion

Produced by Detlef Petersen, except "Time Bomb", produced by Geoffrey Peacey and James Hopkins-Harrison
String arrangements by Peter Hecht
Mixed at Peer Studios (Hamburg) by Geoffrey Peacey and Detlef Petersen
Engineered by Jerry Boys, except "Time Bomb" by Geoffrey Peacey and "Jesus Came Down" by Volker Heintzen
Cover illustration by James McMullan
Design by Paula Scher

LP: Columbia Records PC 34763
CD: Renaissance RMED0123
