= The Mirror (Spooky Tooth album) =

Studio album by Spooky Tooth
- Released: October 1974
- Genre: Rock
- Length: 39:19
- Label: Island
- Producers: Eddie Kramer, Gary Wright, Mick Jones

Spooky Tooth chronology
Witness (1973)	The Mirror (1974)	Cross Purpose (1999)

The Mirror is the seventh studio album by the English rock band Spooky Tooth. It was the only Spooky Tooth album to be released without contributions from Mike Harrison. It also was their last album for nearly twenty-five years, until Cross Purpose in 1999. The Mirror was released in October 1974, one month before group members had permanently disbanded. Members went on to form such bands as Foreigner and The Only Ones.

== Reception ==
Professional ratings
Review scores
Source	Rating
AllMusic	4/5 stars
Rolling Stone	(mixed)
The Rolling Stone Record Guide	2/5 stars

In his review for AllMusic, Jason Anderson rates the album four stars out of five, and writes that "Elements of pop and gospel/R&B are all combined into a seamless rock delivery on The Mirror, giving the record a depth that is rare in the Spooky Tooth catalog."

In 2000, the album was re-released by Dressed to Kill Records with a completely different cover and imagery, plus a different sequencing of songs, as Comic Violence.

The title track "The Mirror" was sampled in Atmosphere's seminal track "Trying to Find a Balance" of their 2003 album Seven's Travels.

In Canada the album reached #88.

== Track listing ==
Side one

1. "Fantasy Satisfier" (Mick Jones, Gary Wright) – 4:37
2. "Two Time Love" (Jones, Mike Patto, Wright) – 3:30
3. "Kyle" (Wright, with Splinter – Bill Elliott, Bob Purvis) – 3:36
4. "Women and Gold" (Wright) – 3:36
5. "Higher Circles" (Wright) – 5:23

Side two

1. "Hell or High Water" (Patto, Wright) – 5:07
2. "I'm Alive" (Wright) – 4:12
3. "The Mirror" (Jones, Patto, Wright) – 5:21
4. "The Hoofer" (Patto, Wright) – 3:57

== Personnel ==
- Mike Patto – vocals, electric piano, clavinet and organ
- Mick Jones – guitars, percussion and backing vocals
- Gary Wright – vocals, piano, clavinet, organ and moog synthesizer
- Val Burke – bass guitar, lead and backing vocals
- Bryson Graham – drums
- James SK Wān – zither

== Charts ==
Chart (1974-75)	Peak position
Canada Top Albums/CDs (RPM)	88
US Billboard 200	130
