= You Broke My Heart So I Busted Your Jaw =

You Broke My Heart So ... I Busted Your Jaw

Studio album by Spooky Tooth
- Released: May 1973
- Studios: Olympic, London; Island, London; Apple, London
- Genre: Blues rock
- Length: 34:50
- Label: Island
- Producer: Spooky Tooth

Spooky Tooth chronology
The Last Puff (1970)	You Broke My Heart So ... I Busted Your Jaw (1973)	Witness (1973)

Professional ratings
Review scores
Source	Rating
AllMusic	2/5 stars
Christgau's Record Guide	C
The Rolling Stone Record Guide	3/5 stars

You Broke My Heart So ... I Busted Your Jaw is the fifth studio album by Spooky Tooth, first released in 1973 on Island Records. It was the first album to be released after the band re-formed, following their 1970 breakup. Founding guitarist Luther Grosvenor did not rejoin the band, as he had joined Mott the Hoople as a guitarist, adopting the stage name of Ariel Bender. Grosvenor was replaced by Mick Jones, who later co-founded Foreigner, while founding drummer Mike Kellie was replaced by Bryson Graham. The album was remastered and re-released on compact disc (CD) by Repertoire in January 2005, with a bonus track. The album would peak at number 178 on the Billboard Album Chart in The States.

== Track listing ==
All songs written by Gary Wright, except where noted.

Side one

1. "Cotton Growing Man" – 4:39
2. "Old as I Was Born" – 4:40
3. "This Time Around" (Bryson Graham) – 4:08
4. "Holy Water" – 3:27

Side two

5. "Wildfire" – 4:04
6. "Self Seeking Man" – 3:47
7. "Times Have Changed" (Mick Jones, Wright) – 3:53
8. "Moriah" – 6:20

2005 CD bonus track

9. "Nobody There at All" (Post, Martin) – 3:44 (Alternate Mix)

== Personnel ==
Spooky Tooth

- Mike Harrison – lead vocals, piano, harmonica
- Mick Jones – guitars, backing vocals
- Gary Wright – organ, backing vocals, piano
- Chris Stewart – bass
- Val Burke – bass, backing vocals
- Bryson Graham – drums, percussion

Other credits

- Chris Kimsey – engineer, mixing
- Phil McDonald – mixing
- Rod Thear – mixing, tape operator
- Klaus Voormann – cover drawings

== Charts ==
Chart (1973)	Peak position
Australian Albums (Kent Music Report)	55
Canada Top Albums/CDs (RPM)	58
US Billboard 200	178
