= Spooky Two =

Studio album by Spooky Tooth
- Released: March 1969 (UK) / August 1969 (North America)
- Studios: Morgan, London
- Genre: Blues rock
- Length: 37:42
- Labels: Island (UK) / A&M (North America); Festival (Australia)
- Producer: Jimmy Miller

Spooky Tooth chronology
It's All About (1968)	Spooky Two (1969)	Ceremony (1969)

Spooky Two is the second studio album by the English rock band Spooky Tooth. It was originally released in March 1969, on the label Island Records (licensed to A&M in the United States).

== Critical reception ==
Professional ratings
Review scores
Source	Rating
AllMusic	4.5/5 stars
MusicHound Rock	3/5
The Rolling Stone Record Guide	4/5 stars
The Village Voice	C+
Encyclopedia of Popular Music	5/5 stars

Spooky Two received mixed reviews from contemporary critics, including Rolling Stone and The Village Voice. Robert Christgau wrote in the latter publication that, "at its best ('Waitin' for the Wind', 'That Was Only Yesterday') this group is not significantly poorer than Blind Faith. At its worst ('Lost in My Dream', 'I've Got Enough Heartaches') it is painfully overwrought."

Mike DeGagne of AllMusic was more positive in a retrospective review: "Spooky Two is this British blues-rock band's pièce de résistance. All eight of the tracks compound free-styled rock and loose-fitting guitar playing, resulting in some fantastic raw music … their smooth, relaxed tempos and riffs mirrored bands like Savoy Brown and, at times, even the Yardbirds … Although Spooky Tooth lasted about seven years, their other albums never really contained the same passion or talented collaborating by each individual musician as Spooky Two."

In Canada the album reached number 48 on the charts.

It was voted number 42 in the All-Time 50 Long Forgotten Gems from Colin Larkin's All Time Top 1000 Albums.

== Track listing ==
All tracks are written by Gary Wright, except where noted.

Side one
No.	Title	Writer(s)	Length
1.	"Waitin' for the Wind"	Luther Grosvenor, Mike Harrison, Wright	3:27
2.	"Feelin' Bad"	Mike Kellie, Wright	3:17
3.	"I've Got Enough Heartaches"	Kellie, Wright	3:24
4.	"Evil Woman"	Larry Weiss	9:00
Total length:			19:08

Side two
No.	Title	Length
1.	"Lost in My Dream"	5:03
2.	"That Was Only Yesterday"	3:51
3.	"Better by You, Better than Me"	4:12
4.	"Hangman Hang My Shell on a Tree"	5:40
Total length:		18:46

== Personnel ==
=== Spooky Tooth ===
- Mike Harrison – keyboards, vocals
- Luther Grosvenor – guitar
- Gary Wright – keyboards, vocals
- Greg Ridley – bass
- Mike Kellie – drums

=== Other credits ===
- Jimmy Miller – producer
- Andy Johns – engineer

== Charts ==
Chart (1969)	Peak position
Canada Top Albums/CDs (RPM)	48
Dutch Albums (Album Top 100)	4
US Billboard 200	44
