= Ceremony (Spooky Tooth and Pierre Henry album) =

Studio album by Spooky Tooth with Pierre Henry
- Released: December 1969
- Genre: Avant-rock; electronic
- Length: 45:13
- Label: Island
- Producer: Spooky Tooth, Pierre Henry

Spooky Tooth chronology
Spooky Two (1969)	Ceremony (1969)	The Last Puff (1970)

Professional ratings
Review scores
Source	Rating
AllMusic	3/5 stars
The Rolling Stone Record Guide	1/5 stars

Ceremony is the third studio album by the rock band Spooky Tooth in collaboration with French experimental composer Pierre Henry. The world premiere was on September 2, 1970, in Olympia, Paris, France. The album was dedicated to Béatrice.

Ceremony earned bad reviews on its original release and was a commercial disappointment, due in part to its drastic departure from the blues rock of Spooky Tooth's earlier output.

== History and critical reception ==
The album takes the form of a mass.

The project was instigated by Gary Wright of Spooky Tooth, who admired Henry's music. However, Wright also said the album effectively ended the band's career. Ceremony is also described being "one of the great screw-ups in rock history". As Wright described:

"...we did a project that wasn't our album. It was with this French electronic music composer named Pierre Henry. We just told the label, 'You know this is his album, not our album. We'll play on it just like [hired] musicians.' And then when the album was finished, they said, 'Oh no no — it's great. We're gonna release this as your next album.' We said, 'You can't do that. It doesn't have anything to do with the direction of Spooky Two and it will ruin our career.' And that's exactly what happened."

Wright left the band following the release of the album.

On the 2024 album Vultures 1 by American hip-hop duo ¥$, "Jubilation" was sampled on the track "Problematic".

== Track listing ==
All tracks are written by Pierre Henry and Gary Wright.

Side one (Note: On some European CD reissues, the song order has been changed to "Confession", "Have Mercy", "Credo" (previously titled "Jubilation"), "Offering", "Hosanna", "Prayer". "Confession" includes approximately ten seconds of electronic effects at the beginning edited out of prior releases.))
No.	Title	Length
1.	"Have Mercy"	7:51
2.	"Jubilation"	8:25
3.	"Confession"	6:53

Side one
No.	Title	Length
1.	"Prayer"	10:50
2.	"Offering"	3:26
3.	"Hosanna (Note: A Pierre Henry-free version of "Hosanna" with different lyrics appears on 2015 Universal release The Island Years 1967–1974 under the title "When I Get Home". The release also includes an alternate take of "Have Mercy" (also without Henry) and a session outtake titled "Shine a Light on Me".)"	7:33

== Personnel ==
Spooky Tooth

- Mike Harrison – vocals
- Luther Grosvenor – guitar
- Gary Wright – vocals, organ
- Andy Leigh – bass guitar
- Mike Kellie – drums

with

- Pierre Henry – musique concrete, electronics

Production

- Produced by Pierre Henry and Spooky Tooth
- Recorded and engineered by Andy Johns
- John Holmes – cover painting

== Charts ==
Chart (1970)	Peak position
German Albums (Offizielle Top 100)	28
US Billboard 200	92
