= Paradise Island (album) =

Studio album by Lake
- Released: 1979
- Studios: Rüssl Studios, Hamburg
- Genre: Rock
- Label: CBS
- Producers: Detlef Petersen, Lake

Lake chronology
Lake II (1978)	Paradise Island (1979)	Ouch! (1980)

Professional ratings
Review scores
Source	Rating
Allmusic	link

Paradise Island is the third studio album by Lake, released in 1979.

== Track listing ==
All tracks written by Detlef Petersen and James Hopkins-Harrison except as indicated

=== Side One ===
1. "Into the Night" - 5:10
2. "Glad to Be Here" (James Hopkins-Harrison, Geoffrey Peacey) - 3:49
3. "Crystal Eyes"- 3:58
4. "Paradise Way" - 4:53

=== Side Two ===
1. "Hopeless Love" - 4:03
2. "One Way Song" (James Hopkins-Harrison, Alex Conti) - 3:46
3. "Hard Road" (James Hopkins-Harrison, Geoffrey Peacey, Alex Conti, Dieter Ahrendt) - 3:40
4. "The Final Curtain" - 5:10 -- together: 34.29 minutes

The CD release of the album is a "two albums on one CD" release, combined with their first album Lake.

== Personnel ==
Lake

- James Hopkins-Harrison - lead and backing vocals
- Alex Conti - guitar, vocals
- Detlef Petersen - keyboards, vocals
- Geoffrey Peacey - keyboards, vocals, guitar
- Martin Tiefensee - bass guitar
- Dieter Ahrendt - drums, percussion

Produced by Detlef Petersen and Lake
Engineered by Geoffrey Peacey and Gero von Gerlach
Recorded and mixed at Russl Studios, Hamburg
Otto Waalkes played congas on "Into the Night"
Cover illustration by James McMullan
Back cover by Benno Friedman
Design by Paula Scher

LP: Columbia Records JC 35817
CD: Renaissance RMED0123
