= The Real Inspector Hound =

One-act play written by Tom Stoppard

- Original language: English
- Written by: Tom Stoppard

Premiere
- Date: 17 June 1968
- Place: United Kingdom

The Real Inspector Hound is a short, one-act play by Tom Stoppard. The plot follows two theatre critics named Moon and Birdboot who are watching a ludicrous country house murder mystery, in the style of a whodunit. By chance, they become involved in the action causing a series of events that parallel the play they are watching.

The play was written between 1961 and 1962, drawing on Stoppard's experiences as a Bristol theatre critic. It was initially named The Stand-ins and later, The Critics. It is a parody of the stereotypical parlour mystery in the style of Agatha Christie's The Mousetrap, as well as of the critics watching the play, with their personal desires and obsessions interwoven into their bombastic and pompous reviews.

The Real Inspector Hound, much like Stoppard's earlier play Rosencrantz & Guildenstern Are Dead, examines the ideas of fate and free will, as well as exploring the themes of the 'play within a play'. Stoppard's play is an example of absurdism as well as farce, parody, and satire. Critics have often praised it as a witty depiction of the reviewer's craft.

== Setting: place and time ==
While the story is set in a theatre, the play within the play is set in Muldoon Manor, a lavish manor surrounded by "desolate marshes" and "treacherous swamps" and paradoxically also located near a cliff. It is a direct parody of Agatha Christie's "closed" settings in which no one can enter or leave, so the characters know that the murderer must be one of them.

The manor itself is described as having French windows and a large settee. The play is set, as announced by Mrs. Drudge when answering the telephone, in the "drawing room of Lady Muldoon’s country residence one morning in early spring".

== Characters ==
=== Critics ===
Moon – a second-string theatre critic, called to the production to review it in the absence of Higgs, another critic. Moon's jealousy of Higgs' superior reputation seems to make him question his own purpose, with Moon's ultimate thoughts being of Higgs' death.

Birdboot – a theatre critic and a womaniser, who catapults young actresses to stardom by delivering dazzling reviews in return, we assume, for sexual favours. While married to Myrtle, he is having an affair with the actress who plays Felicity in the play within the play.

Higgs – the senior critic; Moon is his stand-in.

Puckeridge – the third-string theatre critic, or Moon's stand-in. In early versions of the play, this character was called "McCafferty".

=== Play-within-a-play characters ===
Mrs Drudge – The maid, or char, of Muldoon Manor. One of Stoppard's primary vehicles for emphasising the satirical character of the story. Her cockney accent adds to the humour of Stoppard's play.

Simon Gascoyne – New to the neighbourhood, Simon has had affairs with both Felicity and Cynthia. He takes an instant dislike to Magnus, as they are both in love with Cynthia. Later in the play, Birdboot assumes the role of Simon Gascoyne, and vice versa.

Felicity Cunningham – A beautiful, innocent, young friend of Cynthia's who has had an affair with Simon and Birdboot. She is seemingly sweet and charming, but soon seeks ruthless revenge.

Cynthia Muldoon – Apparent widow of Lord Albert Muldoon who disappeared ten years ago. She claims to be very upset about her husband's disappearance, but the audience is led to think otherwise. Sophisticated and beautiful. She has had an affair with Simon.

Major Magnus Muldoon – Lord Albert Muldoon's crippled half-brother who just arrived from Canada. Has a desire for his late brother's widow, Cynthia. Takes an instant dislike to Simon, as they are both in love with Cynthia.

Inspector Hound – Appears from outside the house in the middle of the play to investigate an alleged phone call. Moon assumes this role near the end of the play, and vice versa.

== Detailed summary ==
The Real Inspector Hound opens with two theatre critics, Moon and Birdboot. Since Moon's superior, Higgs, is unavailable, Moon is called upon to review the production. The other critic, Birdboot, seems to have an interest in the young actress playing Felicity Cunningham. Birdboot states that he is a "respectable married man", yet Moon's comments direct the audience to doubt this statement.

The play within the play is set in "Lady Muldoon's country residence one morning in early spring" and opens with a body lying on an otherwise empty stage. The help, Mrs. Drudge, gravitates to the radio, oblivious to the corpse, and turns it on just in time for an overly expository police message explaining that police are searching for an escaped madman in the swamps surrounding the manor. Simon, a mysterious young man new in the neighbourhood, enters the house, and it is revealed that he has dumped Felicity Cunningham for her friend Cynthia Muldoon, lady of the house. In the audience, Birdboot has mentally done the same. Major Magnus Muldoon, Cynthia's brother-in-law, is also in love with Cynthia. Eventually Inspector Hound from the police force arrives on the scene, apparently searching for the madman, and the company finally notices the body. The company splits up to look for a man of suspicion, when Simon is left alone on stage with the body, he bends over it and seems to recognise the victim, at which point he is shot by an unknown assailant.

During the play the two theatre critics discuss things they may write about this typical whodunit, but they are often sidetracked by their soliloquies, Moon's concerning his professional jealousy of Higgs and Birdboot's concerning his newly found "love", the actress playing Cynthia. As they talk, the telephone on stage begins to ring incessantly until Moon cannot stand it any more. He walks up on stage to answer it only to discover that Birdboot's wife, Myrtle, is on the line. Birdboot speaks to her and as he hangs up, the play suddenly starts again and he gets trapped in it, mistaken for Simon, leading to his inevitable demise as he executes the role to its end, just after recognising the dead body onstage as Higgs, the first string critic who was unavailable that night. Moon ascends the stage to unravel Birdboot's death, taking on the role of Inspector Hound. The actors playing Hound and Simon appear in the critics booth, having now taken the place of the critics and begin to comment on the onstage action, mockingly echoing the pompous manner the critics displayed previously. Major Magnus accuses Moon of being the madman after finding that he is not the real inspector Hound and revealing Moon's murderous thoughts towards Higgs; Major Magnus subsequently shoots Moon. As Moon lies dying on the floor, Magnus reveals himself to not only be the real Inspector Hound but also Cynthia's lost husband, Albert, who had disappeared ten years earlier. Moon, however, also recognises him as third-string critic Puckeridge, who will now become the first-string as both Higgs and Moon are out of the way.

== Premiere ==
The first performance of The Real Inspector Hound took place at the Criterion Theatre in London on 17 June 1968 with the cast as follows:

- Moon – Richard Briers
- Birdboot – Ronnie Barker
- Mrs. Drudge – Josephine Tewson
- Simon Gascoyne – Robin Ellis
- Felicity Cunningham – Patricia Shakesby
- Cynthia Muldoon – Caroline Blakiston
- Major Magnus Muldoon – Antony Webb
- Inspector Hound – Hugh Walters

The play was directed by Robert Chetwyn, while the design was completed by Hutchinson Stott.

== Reception ==
Clive Barnes of The New York Times dubbed The Real Inspector Hound "a perfect joy. Intellectually stimulating and civilized to just short of a fault, [...] The results are hilarious enough, but the froth leaves an oddly provocative aftertaste." Todd Everett of Los Angeles Times billed it as "a timeless farce" in 1992. A Chicago Reader reviewer wrote in 2010 that Stoppard's script "[opens] out beyond satire to express the strange elation, identification, and even erotic fascination any audience member can feel in the dark." The Daily Telegraph's Charles Spencer said that The Real Inspector Hound "brilliantly nails the clichés of the reviewer's craft and the bitter jealousies of this grubby profession". Spencer said the play "[sends] up hackneyed thrillers and terrible acting with a winning mixture of sly humour and palpable affection."

The Guardian's Michael Billington wrote that "Stoppard pins down perfectly the critical tendency towards lofty pronouncements [...] Stoppard also plays brilliantly on the spectator's secret desire to enter the house of illusion", praising the scene when Birdboot crosses the footlights. The critic joked, "If I weren't so scared of sounding like the pretentious Moon, I'd say Stoppard's play is a minor comic masterpiece about the theatrical process." Celia Wren of The Washington Post called it "a brilliant parody" with a "delectably language-drunk, hall-of-mirrors world." In 2012, Anna Lively of The Cambridge Student said that the work "has all the wit and originality that we expect from Tom Stoppard’s plays. [...] it subverts the familiarity of the murder mystery into a satisfyingly complex metatheatrical comedy."

The Tab's Jamie P. Robson dubbed The Real Inspector Hound "an intricate pleasure [...] Myriad elements of the job are fantastically satirised: the bombast, the pretentiousness, the over-intellectual analyses". Robson argued that it "escalates into chaotic brilliance [...] when the critics step through the fourth wall [...] the unstoppable progress of the play-within-the-play to its twist-filled ending is as hilarious as it is magnetic." In 2016, Kate Wingfield of Metro Weekly dubbed it "very fun to be with", writing that "it is Moon’s bafflement that carries the humor and the tenor of Stoppard’s grand design."

BroadwayWorld's Nancy Grossman wrote that "even in this genre, Stoppard finds ways to be clever, inventive, and, at times confounding." Dominic P. Papatola of St. Paul Pioneer Press described Stoppard's story as "toothsome and involved". In 2018, Jonah Dunch of The Gateway called it a "comedic tour de force", praising "Stoppard’s erudite writing and clever plot". In the Daily Herald, Barbara Vitello described the play as "[well]-crafted with the trademark wordplay for which the brainy British writer is known". The Guadalajara Reporter staff wrote, "A classic of the English comic tradition, this play weaves together parody, pastiche and punning to create a wonderfully entertaining and ingenious one-act comedy." Zoe Paskett of the Evening Standard listed it as one of Stoppard's five finest works (the others being Rosencrantz and Guildenstern Are Dead, Travesties, The Real Thing, and Arcadia).

Conversely, Jan Herman stated in a 1991 review for Los Angeles Times that The Real Inspector Hound "is little more than a mannered cuckoo clock of a comedy". Deriding the script as "overdone", Herman argued, "What humor [Stoppard's allusions] still have depends less on recognition of the particular details he has borrowed from Christie’s play than on a more general idea of the traditional conventions of the well-made thriller." Jess M. Bravin of The Harvard Crimson judged the character development and story to be less impressive than the dialogue, and criticized the way that a 1987 Dunster House production "ponderously [followed] every twist in the script." Kay Kipling of Sarasota Magazine called the play "clever" but stated that "I found Hound wearing out its welcome just about five minutes before it actually came to an end. Maybe there’s only so much laughter one can take before tiring."

== External references ==
- Booth, Alison, Hunter, J P., and Mays, Kelly J, eds. The Real Inspector Hound. By Tom Stoppard. New York: W.W. Norton & Company, Inc, 2006.
