= It's All About =

Studio album by Spooky Tooth
- Released: 26 July 1968
- Recorded: Olympic, London
- Genres: Psychedelic rock, blues rock
- Length: 37:42
- Label: Island
- Producer: Jimmy Miller

Spooky Tooth chronology
It's All About (1968)	Spooky Two (1969)

Professional ratings
Review scores
Source	Rating
AllMusic	4/5 stars
Christgau's Record Guide	B−
The Rolling Stone Record Guide	3/5 stars

It's All About is the 1968 debut album by British band Spooky Tooth, released in the United Kingdom by Island Records on 26 July 1968.

In West Germany the record was released by Fontana. The American version of the album, entitled Spooky Tooth, was originally released on Bell in 1968. It was reissued in 1971 by A&M Records as Tobacco Road.

== Critical reception ==
Robert Christgau reviewed the album's 1971 American reissue in Christgau's Record Guide: Rock Albums of the Seventies (1981), preferring it to the band's other records, "before anybody had figured out how to really exploit all these iron zeppelins and lead butterflies". He concluded that it "offers Beatles harmonies, a roundabout song that preceded Yes's, and a straight remake of 'The Weight' in addition to the hilariously melosoulful John D. Loudermilk cover that provides its U.S. title. Ahh, the good old days."

== Track listing ==
=== Original album ===
Side one
No.	Title	Writer(s)	Length
1.	"Society's Child"	Janis Ian	4:30
2.	"Love Really Changed Me"	Luther Grosvenor, Jimmy Miller, Gary Wright	3:33
3.	"Here I Lived So Well"	Wright, Grosvenor, Mike Harrison, Miller	5:06
4.	"Too Much of Nothing"	Bob Dylan	3:57
5.	"Sunshine Help Me"	Wright	3:02
Total length:			20:08

Side two
No.	Title	Writer(s)	Length
1.	"It's All About a Roundabout"	Miller, Wright	2:43
2.	"Tobacco Road"	J.D. Loudermilk	5:33
3.	"It Hurts You So"	Miller, Wright	3:03
4.	"Forget It, I Got It"	Miller, Wright	3:26
5.	"Bubbles"	Grosvenor, Wright	2:49
Total length:			17:34

=== 1971 Tobacco Road release ===
Side one
No.	Title	Writer(s)	Length
1.	"Society's Child"	Janis Ian	4:30
2.	"Love Really Changed Me"	Grosvenor, Miller, Wright	3:33
3.	"Here I Lived So Well"	Wright, Grosvenor, Harrison, Miller	5:06
4.	"The Weight"	Robbie Robertson	3:15
5.	"Sunshine Help Me"	Wright	3:02
Total length:			19:26

Side two
No.	Title	Writer(s)	Length
1.	"It's All About a Roundabout"	Miller, Wright	2:43
2.	"Tobacco Road"	Loudermilk	5:33
3.	"It Hurts You So"	Miller, Wright	3:03
4.	"Forget It, I Got It"	Miller, Wright	3:26
5.	"Bubbles"	Grosvenor, Wright	2:49
Total length:			17:34

== Personnel ==
Spooky Tooth

- Mike Harrison – vocals, harpsichord
- Luther Grosvenor – guitar
- Gary Wright – vocals, organ
- Greg Ridley – bass, guitar
- Mike Kellie – drums

Technical

- Produced by Jimmy Miller
- Engineer: Glyn Johns
- Liner notes: Alan Robinson
- Album photography: Gered Mankowitz
