= Hans Hartz =

German singer-songwriter (1943–2002)

- Born: 22 October 1943; Lunden, Schleswig-Holstein, Germany
- Died: 30 November 2002 (aged 59) Frankfurt, Hesse, Germany
- Genre: Rock
- Occupations: Singer; Liedermacher
- Years active: 1970s–1990s
- Formerly of: Tornados

Hans Hartz (22 October 1943, Lunden – 30 November 2002, Frankfurt) was a German singer and Liedermacher (songwriter).

== Career ==
After working as a temporary worker in various professions and having studied social pedagogy, Hartz began his career as the lead singer of the band the Tornados (today known as Lake). He was discovered by record producer Christoph Busse in 1982 and released several albums. His most famous songs are "Die weißen Tauben sind müde" (1982), "Nur Steine leben lang" (1983), "Ich lebe noch" (1984) and "Sail Away" (1991). He also released a few songs for the English-speaking market.

Hartz died of lung cancer on 30 November 2002 in Frankfurt, aged 59.
