= Ouch! (Lake album) =

- North American cover design

Studio album by Lake
- Released: August 9, 1980 (Europe); June 3, 1981 (US)
- Studios: Pye Studios, London, Caribou Ranch, Colorado, Rüssl Studio, Germany
- Genres: Rock, pop
- Length: 38:16
- Label: CBS
- Producer: James William Guercio

Lake chronology
Paradise Island (1979)	Ouch! (1980)	Hot Day (1981)

Professional ratings
Review scores
Source	Rating
Allmusic	link

Ouch! is the fourth studio album by Lake, released in August 1980 in Europe and June 1981 in the USA. It is the first album to be released following the departure of three members of the band from their peak period, Detlef Petersen, Geoffrey Peacey, and Martin Tiefense, who were replaced by Frank Hieber, Achim Opperman, and Heiko Efferz.

== Track listing ==
=== Side One ===
1. "Celebrate" (James Hopkins-Harrison, Achim Opperman) – 3:51
2. "Come on Home" (J. Hopkins-Harrison, Frank Hieber) – 4:39
3. "Listen to Me" (J. Hopkins-Harrison, F. Hieber, Heiko Efferz) – 4:16
4. "Amigo" (J. Hopkins-Harrison, A. Opperman) – 2:50
5. "Jamaica High" (J. Hopkins-Harrison, Alex Conti, F. Hieber) – 4:47

=== Side Two ===
1. "Living for Today" (J. Hopkins-Harrison, A. Opperman) – 4:31
2. "Something Here" (J. Hopkins-Harrison, F. Hieber) – 4:33
3. "Hit Your Mama" (J. Hopkins-Harrison, F. Hieber) – 4:19
4. "Southern Nights" (J. Hopkins-Harrison, F. Hieber) – 4:29

== Personnel ==
- James Hopkins-Harrison – lead and backup vocals
- Alex Conti – guitars and vocals
- Frank Hieber – keyboards and vocals
- Achim Opperman – guitar, keyboards and vocals
- Heiko Efferz – bass guitar
- Dieter Ahrendt – drums and percussion

Produced by James William Guercio
Recorded at Pye Studios, London, and Caribou Ranch, Colorado
Cover illustration by James McMullan
Design by Paula Scher

USA LP: Caribou Records JZ 37083
CD: Renaissance RMED0127
