= Ian Cussick =

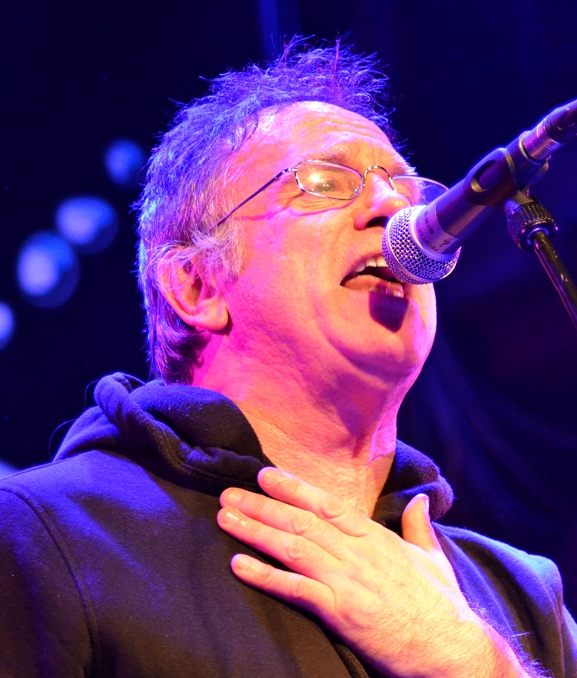
- Singer Ian Cussick - Hamburg 2012

Background information
- Born: 17 June 1954 (age 72)
- Origin: Dundee, Scotland
- Genres: rock music, pop music
- Years active: 1970s-present
- Labels: Metronome, RCA Victor, Line
- Member of: Lake
- Website: talentschmiede.wixsite.com/iancussick

Ian Cussick (born 17 June 1954) is a singer-songwriter from Dundee, Scotland. After leaving school at the age of fifteen, Cussick formed several local bands, with moderate success. In 1973, he answered an advertisement in Melody Maker for a "singer wanted", and flew to Germany to work with the popular showband Lake. He was the singer and bassist of Lake until 1974 and again in the year 2002. Two years later, he was a member of Linda and the Funky Boys, who scored a hit with the early disco song "Shame Shame Shame", which sold around six million singles.

Ian Cussick went on to record twelve solo albums, two EPs and four live albums over a period of thirty years.

The most famous songs are "Meet Me by the Water", "Wonderlove", a homage to Stevie Wonder, and "The Supernatural". He also worked extensively on other productions, including the orchestral Beatles tribute album Norwegian Wood by Rainer "R.A.M." Pietsch which also featured the vocalists Dan McCafferty and Mary Hopkin.

He is a prolific songwriter, and has written hits for other artists, including "Call Me Up" ("Talisman" in the Spanish version) for the female duo Baccara in 1987. "Call Me Up" reached the top 5 in the Spanish charts and the top 40 in Germany. At present, Ian Cussick is part owner in IceBerg Media & Records based in Austin, Texas, USA – from where he works exclusively.

== Discography ==
Solo albums

- 1978 Ian Cussick (Metronome)
- 1980 Right Through the Heart (RCA Victor)
- 1981 Hypertension (RCA Victor)
- 1983 Danger in the Air (RCA Victor)
- 1985 The Great Escape (RCA Victor)
- 1986 Treasure Island (Constant)
- 1989 Love Is the System (Line)
- 1990 Live: The Voice from Scotland (Line)
- 1991 Forever (Line)
- 1993 Necromancer (Niteflite)
- 1995 Live at the Fabrik Hamburg (Line)
- 2000 Rock beim Bund (Live)
- 2004 29-12-03 Live in Hamburg

Singles

- 1978 "Easy Way Out" (Barclay)
- 1980 "Meet Me by the Water" (RCA Victor)
- 1980 "Take Me to Your Leader" (RCA Victor)
- 1981 "The Clapping Song" (RCA Victor)
- 1982 "Don't Turn Your Back on the Man" (RCA Victor)
- 1982 "Wonderlove" (RCA Victor)
- 1983 "The Supernatural" (A&M)
- 1983 "The Meaning" (RCA Victor)
- 1983 "I Read Your Letter" (RCA Victor)
- 1985 "Everything Will Turn Out Fine" (RCA Victor)
- 1985 "Journey out of the Body" (RCA Victor)
- 1986 "Who Dares Wins" (Constant)
- 1986 "Treasure Island" (Constant)
- 1988 "Too Lonely to Win" (EMI)
- 1988 "We Can Work It Out" (SPV)
- 1988 "Mighty Love" (Joschua Music)
- 1989 "Love Is the System" (Line)
- 1991 "Runaway Train" (Line)
- 1992 "Meet Me by the Water (Remake '92)" (BMG Ariola Media)
- 1992 "A Bridge So Far" (Line)
- 1993 "Slowly Ends the Day" (RCA Victor)
- 2008 Powerboat Racing (EP)

Contributions

- 1986 "Ice in the Sunshine" (singer of original jingle)
- 1988 R.A.M. Pietsch – Norwegian Wood
