= Lake (German band) =

German rock music band

- Origin: Hamburg, Germany
- Genre: Rock
- Years active: 1973–1986; 2002–present
- Labels: CBS, Polydor
- Members: Alex Conti; Ian Cussick; Mickie Stickdorn; Jens Skwirblies; Holger Trull
- Past members: James Hopkins-Harrison; Geoff Peacey; Detlef Petersen; Martin Tiefensee; Josef Kappl; Dieter Ahrendt
- Website: www.lake-music.de

Lake is a German-British rock music group that formed in 1973 in Hamburg, Germany. In the latter half of 1974, they were joined by lead singer James Hopkins-Harrison, who gave them their signature sound for the remainder of their recording career.

== History ==
The band was originally active as The Tornados between 1967 and 1973, before reincarnated as Lake in 1973. They achieved modest success in Europe from the mid-1970s through the early 1980s, particularly in Germany where they were named artist of the year by the German Phono Academy in 1977. That same year, their self-titled debut album reached #92 in the US, and the single Time Bomb reached #83, which would prove to be their greatest success in the US. The album reached #97 while Time Bomb reached #91 in Canada. Lake toured the US in the late 1970s as the opening act for various headline acts, including Lynyrd Skynyrd, Black Oak Arkansas, and Neil Young. On June 23, 1978, they were the opening act of a rock festival at the Feyenoord football stadium in Rotterdam, The Netherlands, and were followed by Eric Clapton, Champion Jack Dupree and headliner Bob Dylan. After their contract with CBS was discontinued the label released previously unavailable live material from stage appearances between May 1979 and October 1980, introducing the Lake 1 (incl. Detlef Petersen) and the Lake 2 (incl. Achim Oppermann) formations on the double live album Live - On the Run. The band was able to sign another contract with the German Polydor label and in 1984 they released album #6, No Time for Heroes.

In 1985 Lake released Voices and in 1986 recorded its final Polydor album, So What. Longtime drummer Dieter Ahrendt left and was replaced by Udo Dahmen. Bassist Jo (Josef) Kappl also left, replaced by Benjamin Hüllenkrämer. So What included "Inside To Outside", written by Achim Oppermann which had already been performed by former Kajagoogoo lead singer Limahl. Lake ceased to exist by 1986/87. James Hopkins-Harrison died from a heroin overdose in 1991.

At the beginning of the new millennium, Lake was revived by Alex Conti, including Mike Starrs, Adrian Askew, Mickie Stickdorn, and Michael "Bexi" Becker. In March 2005, the first Lake studio recording in 20 years was released: The Blast of Silence.

After having had to withdraw their 2012 album, Freedom, due to quarrels with their then singer, Lloyd Anderson; their original singer, Ian Cussick, rejoined the band. In February 2014, Lake released their new album Wings of Freedom, which contains most of the material of Freedom (except for three songs which have been replaced by two new songs), with new vocals by Cussick.

== Personnel ==
The lineup during their period of peak success (1976-1980) consisted of:

- Martin Tiefensee - bass (1970-1980)
- Detlef Petersen - keyboards (1970-1980)
- Geoff Peacey - keyboards (1973-1980)
- James Hopkins-Harrison - lead vocals (1974-1986?)
- Alex Conti - guitars (1975-1981)
- Dieter Ahrendt - drums (1975-1985)

Additional personnel during their early years:

- Hans Hartz - vocals (before 1973)
- Spencer Mallinson - Guitars (1974-1975)
- Fritz "Freddy" Graack - drums (1970-1975)
- Ian Cussick - bass, vocals (1973-1974)
- Oreste "Lilio" Malagia - guitars (1973-1975)
- Bernard "Benny" Whelan - trumpet (1973-1975)
- Gerd Beliaeff - saxophone, trombone (1973-1975)

Additional personnel during their later years:

- Heiko Efferts - bass (1980-1981)
- Frank Hieber - keyboards (1980-1983)
- Achim Oppermann - keyboards, guitar (1980-1986?)
- Jo Kappl - bass (1981-1985)
- Erlend Krauser - guitars (1981-1983)
- Bernd Gärtig - guitars (1984-1986?)
- Benjamin Hüllenkrämer - bass (1984-1986?)
- Thomas Bauer - keyboards (1984-1986?)
- Udo Dahmen - drums (1984-1986?)

2005 Line up

- Alex Conti - guitars
- Mike Starrs - vocals
- Adrian Askew - keyboards
- Mickie Stickdorn - drums
- Michael "Bexi" Becker - bass

2013 Line up

- Alex Conti - guitars
- Ian Cussick - vocals
- Jens Skwirblies - keyboards
- Mickie Stickdorn - drums
- Holger Trull - bass

== Discography ==
=== Albums ===
- Lake (1976)
- Lake II (1978)
- Paradise Island (1979)
- Ouch! (1980)
- Hot Day (1981)
- Lake Live... On The Run (1982)
- No Time For Heroes (1984)
- Voices (1985)
- In The Midnight (1986)
- So What (1986)
- Greatest Hits (1990)
- Definitive Collection (1997)
- Paradise Way - The Very Best of Lake (2004)
- The Blast of Silence (2005)
- Freedom (2012)
- Wings Of Freedom (2014)
- Four (2026)

=== Singles ===
- "Come Down" / "We´re Gonna rock" (1973)
- "King of the Rock'n Roll Party" / "She's Allright" (1973)
- "Sailor" / "Freedom Dreamer" (1974)
- "On the Run" / "Time Bomb" (1976)
- "Jesus Came Down" / "Chasing Colors" (1976)
- "Do I Love You" / "Key to the Rhyme" (1977)
- 12" Live Maxi: "Lost By the Wayside" / "See Them Glow" / "Chasing Colours" / "Black Friday" (1977)
- "Letters of Love" / "Lost By the Wayside" (1978)
- "See Them Glow" / "Angel in Disguise"' (1978)
- "Hard Road" / "One Way Song" (1979)
- "One Way Song" / "Paradise Way" (1979)
- "Living for Today" / "Jamaica High" (1980)

=== DVDS ===
- Live (2007)
