= The Last Puff =

Studio album by Spooky Tooth
- Released: July 1970
- Recorded: Island, London
- Genres: Progressive rock; psychedelic rock; blues rock; art rock
- Length: 35:15
- Label: Island
- Producers: Chris Stainton, Chris Blackwell

Spooky Tooth chronology
Ceremony (1969)	The Last Puff (1970)	You Broke My Heart So I Busted Your Jaw (1973)

Professional ratings
Review scores
Source	Rating
AllMusic	4.5/5 stars
Christgau's Record Guide	C+
The Rolling Stone Record Guide	4/5 stars

The Last Puff is the fourth studio album by British rock band Spooky Tooth, released in 1970.

== History and critical reaction ==
For the only time in its history, the band was billed as "Spooky Tooth featuring Mike Harrison". The album was released following the departure of co-lead singer and principal songwriter Gary Wright. Wright had left the band in early 1970, following the release of Ceremony in December 1969.

"Something to Say" was co-written by Joe Cocker and appeared on his 1972 album Joe Cocker. Grease Band members Henry McCullough, Chris Stainton and Alan Spenner joined original Spooky Tooth members Harrison, Grosvenor and Kellie to complete the album. The Grease Band members had achieved international prominence the year before, backing Joe Cocker at Woodstock. The album was co-produced by Stainton and Chris Blackwell.

As one reviewer commented, "...Harrison proved more than ready to command center stage in 'Puff'. His interplay with the newly augmented band mimicked the heavy rock-soul vibe Cocker tapped on his debut. That was most obvious in a cover of The Beatles' "I Am the Walrus", which provided a thrilling parallel to Cocker's shout-it-to-the-heavens take on "With A Little Help From My Friends" from the year before."

Despite the promise of the album, the band broke up shortly after its release. A year later, McCullough, Stainton and Spenner released the first of two Grease Band albums, while Harrison and Grosvenor both released solo albums.

In Canada the album reached #70.

== Track listing ==
=== Side one ===
1. "I Am the Walrus" (John Lennon, Paul McCartney) – 6.20
2. "The Wrong Time" (Gary Wright, Hugh McCracken) – 5:07
3. "Something to Say" (Joe Cocker, Peter Nichols) – 6.05

=== Side two ===
1. "Nobody There At All" (Mike Post, Timothy Martin) – 4.06
2. "Down River" (David Ackles) – 5.20
3. "Son of Your Father" (Elton John, Bernie Taupin) – 4.02
4. "The Last Puff" (Chris Stainton) – 4.15

== Personnel ==
Spooky Tooth

- Mike Harrison – vocals
- Luther Grosvenor – guitar
- Henry McCullough – guitar
- Chris Stainton – bass, piano, organ, guitar
- Alan Spenner – bass
- Mike Kellie – drums

== Charts ==
Chart (1970)	Peak position
Canada Top Albums/CDs (RPM)	70
German Albums (Offizielle Top 100)	31
US Billboard 200	84
