= The V.I.P.'s (band) =

1960s British R&B band

- Also known as: The Vipps, Art (1967)
- Origin: Carlisle, England
- Genres: R&B; psychedelic rock; freakbeat
- Years active: 1963–1967
- Labels: Island; CBS; RCA Victor; Philips
- Past members: Mike Harrison; Greg Ridley; Frank Kenyon; Jimmy Henshaw; Luther Grosvenor; Walter Johnstone; Mike Kellie; Keith Emerson

The V.I.P.'s were a British R&B musical group formed in Carlisle, Cumberland, England in late 1963. They came from an earlier outfit known as the Ramrods, who had formed in Carlisle in 1960. Initially associated with the mod scene, the band changed their name to Art in 1967 and released the album Supernatural Fairy Tales. Record Collector magazine have referred to the group as freakbeat, a retrospective label describing the transition from British beat and rhythm and blues to psychedelia.

== Career ==
The band members at various times were: Mike Harrison (lead vocals) (ex Dino and the Danubes, The Dakotas, The Ramrods); Greg Ridley (bass guitar) (ex Dino and the Danubes, The Dakotas); Frank Kenyon (rhythm guitar) (1963–67) (born 12 October 1945, Carlisle) (ex The Teenages, The Ramrods); Jimmy Henshaw (lead guitar) (1963–67) (born James Henshaw, 20 October 1941, in Newarthill, near Motherwell, North Lanarkshire, Scotland died 1 May 2007, Carlisle) (ex The Ramrods); Keith Emerson (organ) (ex-Gary Farr & The T-Bones) (1966–1967); Luther Grosvenor (lead guitar) (1967); Walter Johnstone (drummer) (1963–67) (born 11 March 1943, Carlisle) (ex The Teenages, The Ramrods); and Mike Kellie (drummer) (1967).

When Emerson left in early 1967 to form The Nice, Harrison, Ridley, Grosvenor and Kellie changed their name to 'Art', and released one album, Supernatural Fairy Tales, produced by Guy Stevens, covering Stephen Stills' "What's That Sound (For What It's Worth)" and Felix Cavaliere's "Come on Up". The group then disbanded, with all four members of the group's final line-up forming Spooky Tooth, with the addition of the American musician Gary Wright, later that same year.

They also participated in a psychedelic album entitled Featuring The Human Host and the Heavy Metal Kids by a collective known as Hapshash and the Coloured Coat, formed by Guy Stevens and an influential British graphic design and avant-garde musical partnership between Michael English and Nigel Waymouth. The musicians involved in that project were Mike Harrison on keys and vocals, Luther Grosvenor on guitars, Greg Ridley on bass and Mike Kellie on drums, as well as Stevens, English and Waymouth. It was the first time that the term 'heavy metal' was ever used in music, even though that album had nothing to do with heavy metal music, being closer to psychedelic music. The album was issued in 1967 by Liberty Records, and contained only five songs from two minutes to more than 15 minutes of psychedelic and almost meditative state kind of music.

== Discography ==
=== Studio albums ===
- Supernatural Fairy Tales (Island 1967 – as 'Art')

=== Compilation albums ===
- The Complete V.I.P.s (2 CDs, 28 tracks) (Repertoire)

=== EPs ===
- Stagger Lee, Fontana, France
- What's That Sound (For What It's Worth), Fontana, France
- I Wanna Be Free, Fontana, France
- Straight Down to the Bottom, Fontana, France

=== Singles ===
- "Don't Keep Shouting at Me" (UK RCA Victor, 1964)
- "Mercy, Mercy" (as The Vipps), U.S. only single, produced by Derek Lawrence)
- "Wintertime" (as The Vipps, CBS)
- "I Wanna Be Free" (Island)
- "Straight Down to the Bottom" (Island)
- "What's That Sound (For What It's Worth)" (Island – as 'Art')
