= The Way It Was, The Way It Is =

Studio album by Lou Rawls
- Released: 1969
- Recorded: 1969
- Genre: R&B
- Length: 34:48
- Label: Capitol

Lou Rawls chronology
Come On In, Mister Blues (1968)	The Way It Was, The Way It Is (1969)	Your Good Thing (1969)

Singles from The Way It Was, The Way It Is
- 1. "Your Good Thing (Is About to End)" Released: June 1969

The Way It Was, The Way It Is is the sixteenth studio album by American R&B singer Lou Rawls. It peaked at number 103 on the Billboard Top LPs & Tape chart in 1969.

== Track listing ==
=== Side one ===
1. "Fa Fa Fa Fa Fa (Sad Song)" – 2:38
2. "Trying Just as Hard as I Can" – 2:36
3. "Your Good Thing (Is About to End)" – 4:30
4. "I Love You Yes I Do" – 4:03
5. "When a Man Loves a Woman" – 2:55

=== Side two ===
1. "Season of the Witch" – 5:50
2. "Gentle on My Mind" – 2:49
3. "I Wonder" – 2:45
4. "I Want to Be Loved (But Only by You)" – 2:51
5. "It's You" – 2:39

== Charts ==
Chart (1969)	Peak position
US Billboard 200	103
