= Henrik Freischlader =

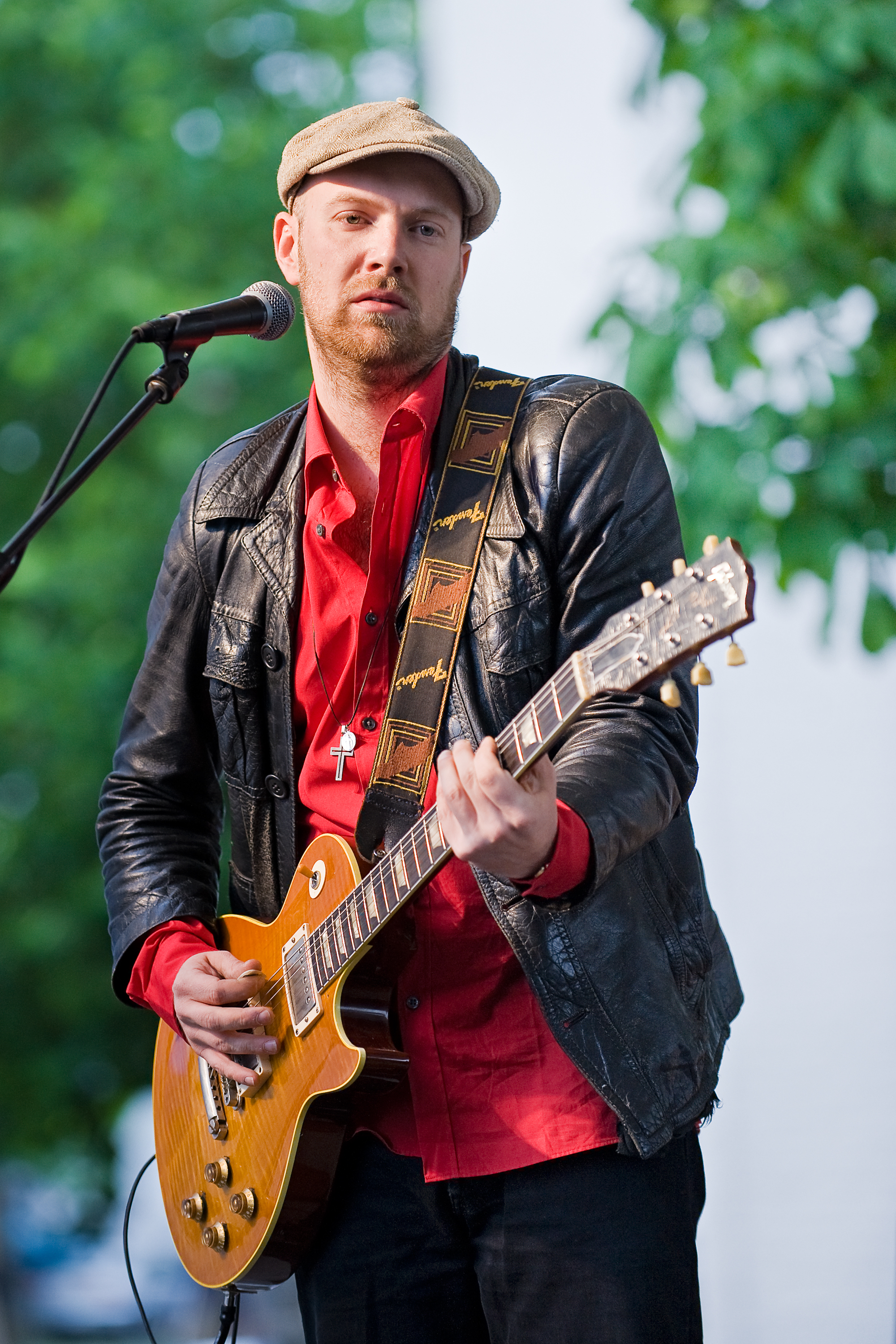
- Henrik Freischlader

Background information
- Born: 3 November 1982 (age 43); Wuppertal, West Germany
- Genres: Blues, blues rock, rock, jazz, funk, soul
- Occupations: Musician, songwriter, producer
- Instruments: Guitar, vocals, bass guitar, drums, keyboards, percussion
- Years active: 1998–present
- Label: Cable Car Records
- Website: henrikfreischlader.com

Henrik Freischlader (born 3 November 1982) is a German blues guitarist, singer-songwriter, producer, and autodidactic multi-instrumentalist from Wuppertal, Germany.

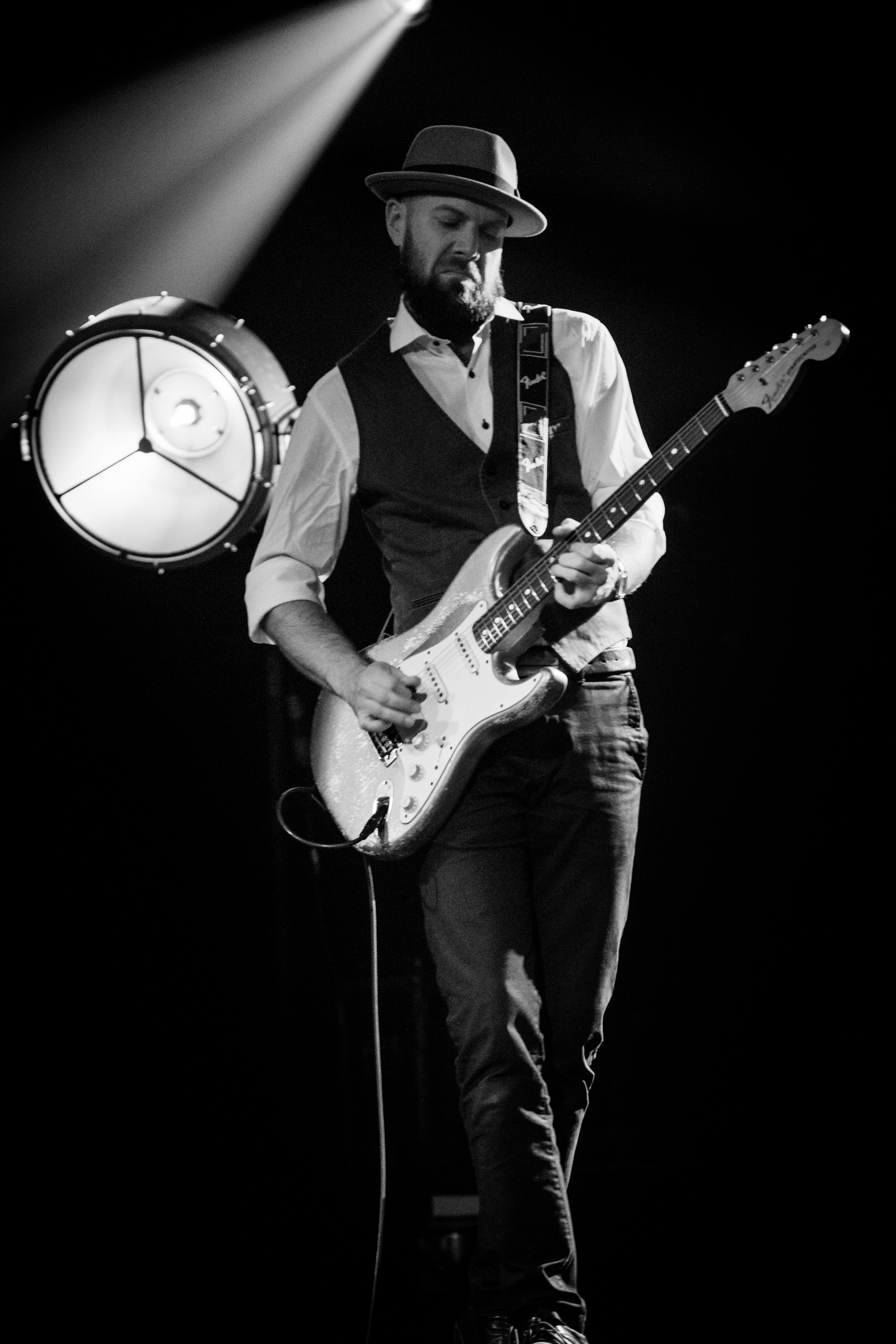
Henrik Freischlader Trio live at Leverkusener Jazztage (Germany) on 11 November 2016

Henrik Freischlader has been the supporting act for Joe Bonamassa, B.B. King, Gary Moore, Peter Green, Johnny Winter and other blues legends.

== Approach ==
His style of music cannot be considered pure blues. He often blends in musical styles such as rock, jazz, soul, and funk, even though blues is the basis of all of his songs. His guitar-playing is influenced by Gary Moore, Stevie Ray Vaughan, B.B. King, Peter Green, Albert Collins and Albert King. As he grew up, Freischlader taught himself how to play drums, bass guitar, guitar and other instruments.

Since his first album, Henrik Freischlader has been using Realtone amplifiers culminating in a signature amp. Freischlader's main guitar is a Haar Stratocaster copy in sunburst that has a Fender decal on its headstock. Further, he uses various Gibson Les Pauls and a Fender Telecaster.

== Recordings and performances ==
During his teenage years, he started his career as a blues guitarist and singer in bands such as Lash and Bluescream. In 2004, he formed the Henrik Freischlader Band and released his first album The Blues in 2006. The follow-up album "Get Closer" was released a year later in 2007. A live album then followed in 2008 entitled Henrik Freischlader Band Live. On his studio album Recorded by Martin Meinschäfer (2009) he plays all instruments – guitar, bass guitar, drums, percussion and Hammond organ. In addition to this, he composed the songs, wrote the lyrics, produced the record and released it on his own record label, Cable Car Records. A second live album – Tour 2010 Live – was published in late 2010 after a tour through Germany, Austria, and Switzerland.

In 2011, Freischlader released the album Still Frame Replay on which he again plays most of the instruments. Moritz Fuhrhop (Hammond organ) and Max Klaas (percussion) joined him in the studio. As special guest, his friend Joe Bonamassa plays the solo guitar on the title track. Henrik Freischlader has played with his band throughout Europe. Current band members are Theofilos Fotiadis (bass guitar, backing vocals), Björn Krüger (drums, backing vocals), and Moritz "Mo" Fuhrhop (Hammond organ).

In September 2012, the Henrik Freischlader Band released their latest album House in the Woods which was recorded live by all four band members at Megaphon Tonstudios with additional vocal recordings. In fall 2012, they went on an extensive tour through Germany, Austria, Switzerland, Hungary, the Netherlands, and Belgium; in 2013: the UK, Switzerland, Belgium, the Netherlands, Germany, the Czech Republic and Hungary.

== Band ==
- Henrik Freischlader guitar, vocals
- Theofilos Fotiadis bass guitar
- Dave Warmerdam piano, keyboard, Hammond organ
- Björn Krüger drums

== Discography ==
- The Blues CD (2006/ZYX Music), Double LP Vinyl (2012/Pepper Cake/Cargo Records)
- Get Closer CD (2007/ZYX Music), Double LP Vinyl (2012/Pepper Cake/Cargo Records)
- Henrik Freischlader Band Live 3 CDs (2008/Pepper Cake)
- 5 LIVE in the kitchen CD and LP Vinyl 180 gr. Moritz Fuhrhop, Henrik Freischlader, Tommy Schneller, Mickey Neher, Olli Gee. A co-operation with Leo Gehl, DEUTSCHLANDFUNK (2008).
- Recorded By Martin Meinschäfer CD, Double LP Vinyl 180 gr., and MC (2009/Cable Car Records)
- Tour 2010 Live 2-CD (2010/Cable Car Records)
- Still Frame Replay CD and Double Vinyl 180 gr. (2011/Cable Car Records)
- House in the Woods CD and LP Vinyl 180 gr. (2012/Cable Car Records)
- Live in Concerts (Show No. 47/2011 & Show No. 27/2012) 4 CDs (2013/Cable Car Records)
- Night Train To Budapest CD and Double Vinyl 180 gr. (2013/Cable Car Records)
- Live 2014 – Night Train To Budapest Farewell Tour CD and Double Vinyl 180 gr. (2015/Cable Car Records)
- Openness CD and Double Vinyl 180 gr. (2016/Cable Car Records)
- Blues for Gary CD and Double Vinyl 180 gr. (2017/Cable Car Records)
- Who 33 limited Double Vinyl 180 gr. (2018/Cable Car Records)
- Hands on the Puzzle CD and Double Vinyl 180 gr. (2018/Cable Car Records)
- Live 2019 2-CD and Triple Vinyl 180 gr. (2019/Cable Car Records)
- Missing Pieces CD and Double Vinyl 180 gr. (2020/Cable Car Records)
- Recorded by Martin Meinschäfer II CD and Double Vinyl 180 gr. (2022/Cable Car Records)
- Little Big Beat – Studio Live Session 2-CD and Double Vinyl 180 gr. (2023/LoEnd Records)

== DVDs ==
- Show No. 47 2 DVDs including the final show of the 2011 Still Frame Replay Tour and the bonus film Still Frame Impressions (2012/Cable Car Records)
