= Witness (Spooky Tooth album) =

Studio album by Spooky Tooth
- Released: November 1973
- Studios: Olympic, London; Island, London
- Length: 35:04
- Label: Island
- Producer: Spooky Tooth

Spooky Tooth chronology
| You Broke My Heart So I Busted Your Jaw (1973) | Witness (1973) | The Mirror (1974) |

Witness is the sixth studio album by English rock band Spooky Tooth. For this recording, original drummer Mike Kellie returned and substantially replaced Bryson Graham. Gary Wright remained the dominant songwriter at this stage of the band's history. Co-lead singer Mike Harrison left the band following the LP's release. The album was remastered and re-released on compact disc (CD) in January 2005 by Repertoire Records.

The cover art features the symbol Eye of Providence.

== Track listing ==
All songs written by Gary Wright, except where noted.

Side one

1. "Ocean of Power" – 4:40
2. "Wings on My Heart" – 3:32
3. "As Long as the World Keeps Turning" – 3:40
4. "Don't Ever Stray Away" (Chris Stewart, Wright) – 3:14
5. "Things Change" – 4:19

Side two

6. "All Sewn Up" (Mick Jones, Wright) – 3:44
7. "Dream Me a Mountain" – 3:31
8. "Sunlight of My Mind" – 4:56
9. "Pyramids" (Mike Kellie, Wright) – 4:28

== Personnel ==
Spooky Tooth

- Mike Harrison – lead and backing vocals, percussion
- Mick Jones – electric and acoustic guitars, backing vocals
- Gary Wright – keyboards, backing and lead vocals, synthesizer
- Chris Stewart – bass
- Mike Kellie – drums, percussion

Other credits

- Brian Humphries – engineer
- Takeo Komatsuzaki – liner notes
- Chris Welch – liner notes
- Tom Wilkes – photography and album design

== Charts ==
| Chart (1973) | Peak position |
|---|---|
| US Billboard 200 | 99 |
