= Halo Records =

Record label

Halo Records, also known as Halo UK Records, is an independent British record label, established in 2000.

== History ==
Halo Records was formed by persons formerly associated with Chrysalis Records and Virgin Records, among other industry associations. The executive producer of the company is Michael Karl Maslen, a guitarist and songwriter with previous experience as a producer.

The company has primarily been engaged in the development of new artists and is generally focused on releasing singles and related videos. The company has produced records by such artists as Jane Ledsom, Craine, Dream Capture, Kelly Lee, Kat Gang, Navaro, Kinch, Luci Cahn, Rietta Austin Medicine Hat, Tracey Brennecke and Mike Harrison.

The company is not associated with others using the same or a similar name, such as Halo Records (Canada), Halo Records (US) or Halo the Label (Australia).
