= Touch (Mike Harrison Hamburg Blues Band album) =

Studio album by Mike Harrison and the Hamburg Blues Band
- Released: 2001
- Genre: Rock, pop
- Label: Ruf Records

Touch is an album released on Ruf Records in 2001 by Mike Harrison and the Hamburg Blues Band.

== History ==
Billed as "Mike Harrison meets the Hamburg Blues Band", the album followed an invitation to Mike Harrison in 1999 to regularly appear with the Hamburg Blues Band. The album is notable for featuring new songs by lyricist Pete Brown, with music by members of the Hamburg Blues Band, and lead vocals by Harrison.

The album received mixed reviews. As one reviewer commented, "Mike's voice is more reminiscent of Ray Charles now that he's older and is perfect for blues rock... This is one of those CDs you listen to for the first time and feel like you've been listening to it your entire life and not just because of the Spooky Tooth song at the end." In contrast, another reviewer commented that "the band members are decent musicians, but their playing and the album's production is just too sterile, too perfect, lacking that certain 'oomph' or 'edge' that turns the ordinary into something special. Sadly, my critique goes for Mike's vocals as well, he sounds like he's 'going through the motions' and never transcends the material, not even on their closing cover of Spooky Tooth's 'Waiting For The Wind.'

== Track listing ==
All lyrics by Pete Brown, music by Conti, Lange, Wallbaum and Becker, unless otherwise noted.

1. "Hold Back"
2. "Movin' On"
3. "Try Me Again"
4. "Make Me Smile"
5. "Security"
6. "There's a Road"
7. "King of Hearts" (Lyrics: Lange and R. Nicholas. Music: Conti, Lange, Wallbaum and Becker)
8. "Perfect Day" (Lyrics: D. Storey. Music: D. Petersen)
9. "Hittin' The Spot"
10. "True Lies"
11. "Waiting For The Wind" (Bonus Track; Wright, Grosvenor, Harrison)
