= Mike Harrison (musician) =

English rock singer (1942–2018)

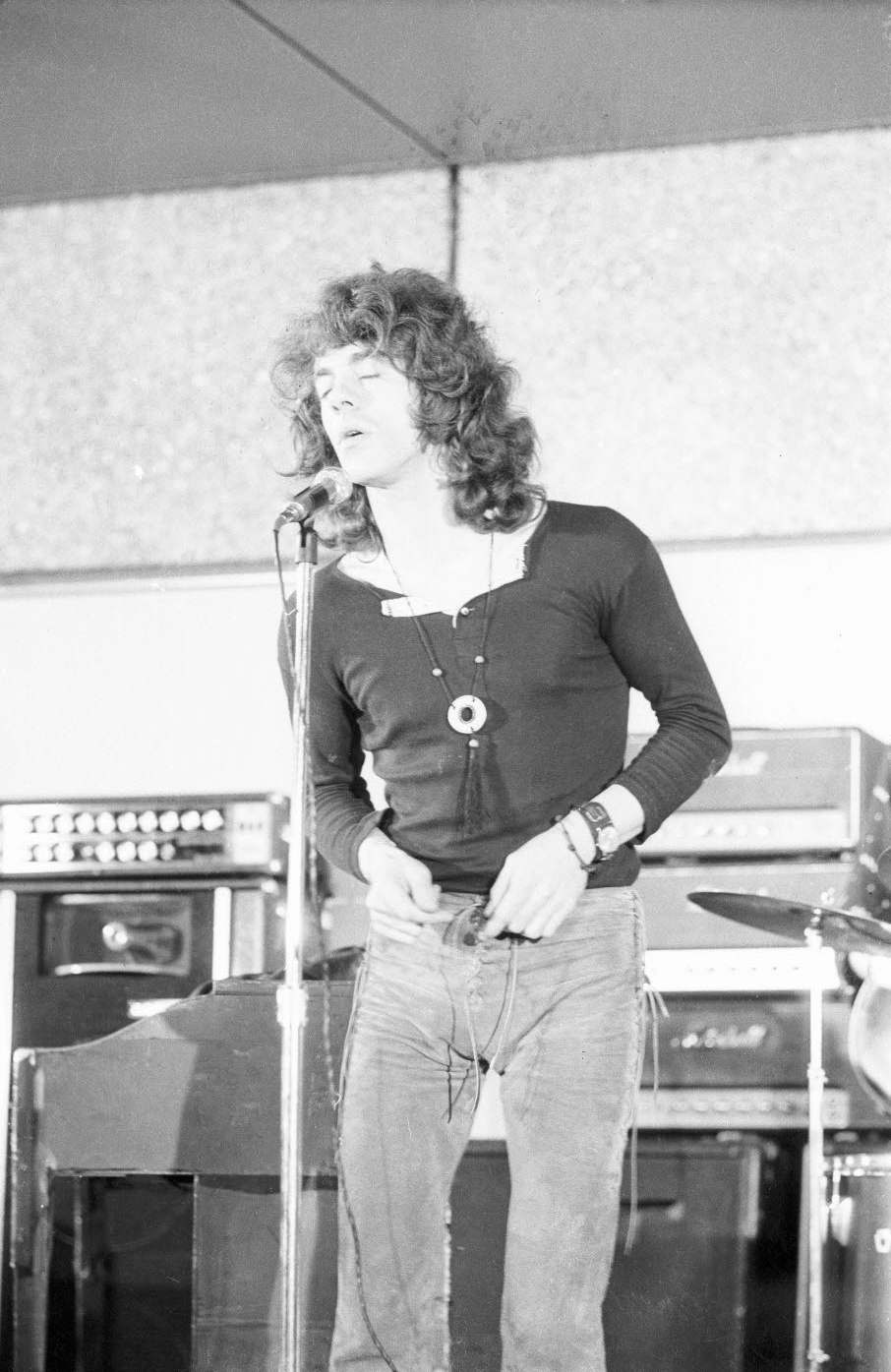
- Mike Harrison in 1969

Background information
- Born: 30 September 1942; Carlisle, Cumberland, England
- Died: 25 March 2018 (aged 75) Carlisle
- Genres: Psychedelic rock Progressive rock
- Occupations: Singer, musician
- Instruments: Vocals, keyboards
- Years active: 1963–1975; 1997–2018
- Formerly of: The V.I.P.'s, Art, Spooky Tooth, Hamburg Blues Band

Mike Harrison (30 September 1942 in Carlisle, Cumberland, England – 25 March 2018, Carlisle) was an English singer and musician, most notable as a principal lead singer of Spooky Tooth and as a solo artist. He was also the lead singer in the V.I.P.'s, Art, and the Hamburg Blues Band, among others.

== Spooky Tooth ==
Mike Harrison began his musical career with the Ramrods a band originating from Carlisle in the historic county of Cumberland, the northern part of the ceremonial county of Cumbria. This was to develop the foundations of a career that led to him being notable as the lead singer of Spooky Tooth, a band that he initially co-founded, with Mike Kellie, Luther Grosvenor and Greg Ridley, and which Gary Wright then joined. Harrison, Grosvenor, Ridley and Kellie had previously been in a Carlisle-based freakbeat band called the V.I.P.'s, which also included Keith Emerson. When Emerson left in early 1967 to co-found the Nice, the remaining band members changed the band's name to Art and released one album in late 1967 on Island Records. Label owner Chris Blackwell took an interest in the band, encouraging them to work with Gary Wright and arranging for Jimmy Miller to be the band's producer. With the addition of Wright, the band became known as Spooky Tooth, releasing four albums between 1968 and 1970, before breaking up for the first time, and three more albums during their reformation and final breakup in the 1972-1974 period. The band's sound was considered to be particularly unique in that it involved two keyboard players, Harrison and Wright, whose singing style often involved alternating vocals, similar to the Righteous Brothers or Hall & Oates.

Spooky Tooth first broke up in 1970, reformed in 1972 and broke up for a second time in 1974. Harrison developed a renewed interest in music as of the 1990s, resulting in the recording of three songs with original members Mike Kellie, Luther Grosvenor and Greg Ridley in 1997. Recording continued in 1998, resulting in the release of Cross Purpose in 1999, the first Spooky Tooth album in twenty-five years, following the 1974 release of The Mirror, in which Harrison had not participated. He had left the band in 1973, following the release of Witness. Cross Purpose was also the first Spooky Tooth album to feature four of the five original members since Spooky Two, released in 1969.

Harrison's return to music during the 1997-1999 period was followed by a 2004 reunion and tour with original Spooky Tooth members Gary Wright and Mike Kellie, which resulted in the release of the concert DVD Nomad Poets in 2007. In 2006, Harrison's fourth solo album, Late Starter, was released.

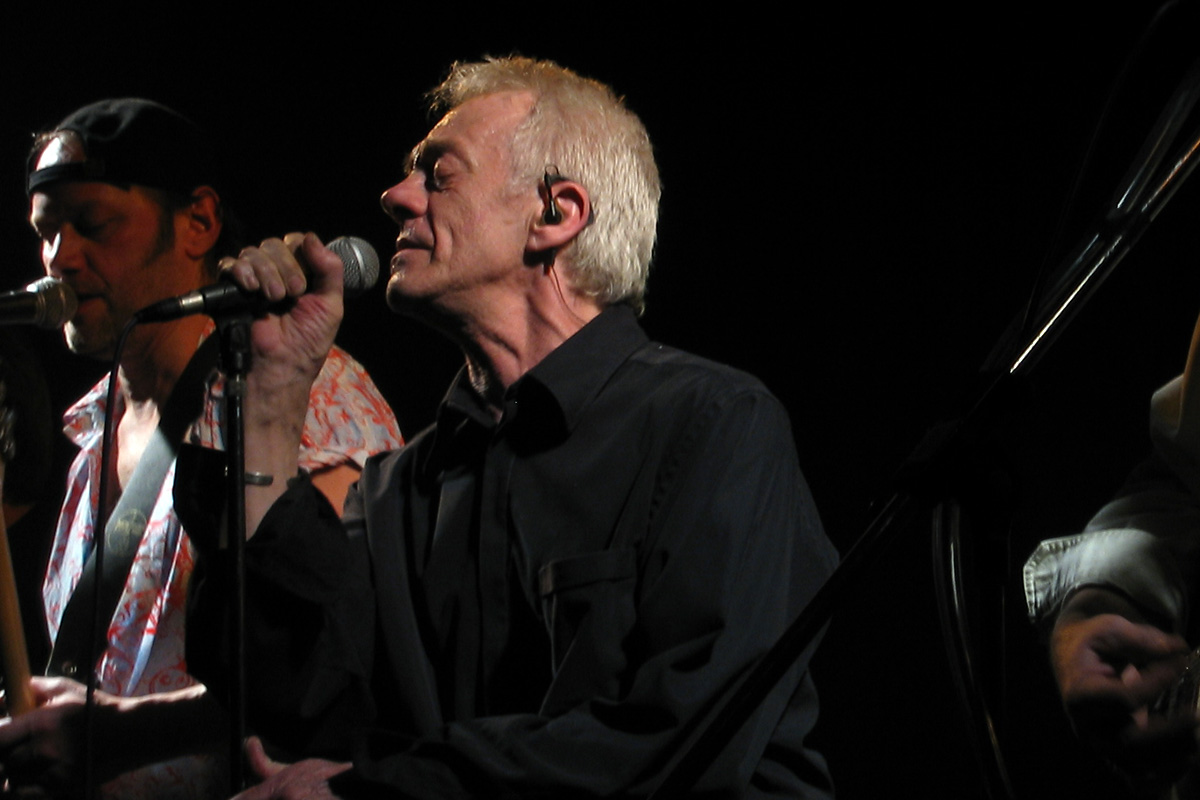
Mike Harrison with Hamburg Blues Band in 2004

Harrison, Wright and Kellie continued to perform as Spooky Tooth during 2008, after which Kellie departed. Harrison and Wright continued as Spooky Tooth during 2009.

== Solo ==
Harrison commenced a solo career in 1971, which was anticipated with The Last Puff, the band's 1970 breakup album, billed as "Spooky Tooth, featuring Mike Harrison". Harrison released two solo albums in 1971 and 1972, followed by a third in 1975, subsequent to the band's final breakup in 1974.

Harrison then discovered that the royalties from his solo albums were being applied, without his knowledge or consent, to debts allegedly owed by Spooky Tooth to Island Records. Following the 1975 release of his album Rainbow Rider, Harrison decided to leave the music industry entirely, and remained largely inactive from 1975 until 1997. The reason for his extended departure from music was primarily financial. Beyond a weekly stipend from Island Records, band members received no further benefits, including royalties. Instead, debts were accumulated, considered to be owed to the record company. Among other occupations, Harrison worked as a barman and drove meat and milk delivery trucks.

In 1999, Harrison was also offered a regular monthly engagement with the Hamburg Blues Band. This led to the release of Touch in 2001. The album featured lyrics by Pete Brown, longtime collaborator with Jack Bruce, with music by the Hamburg Blues Band and vocals by Harrison.

== Death ==
Harrison continued to perform on occasion after that time, but died on 25 March 2018 in Carlisle at age 75. The cause of death was undisclosed.

== Discography ==
Solo

- 1971 Mike Harrison (Island)
- 1972 Smokestack Lightning (Island)
- 1975 Rainbow Rider (Island)
- 2006 Late Starter (Halo)

With The V.I.P.'s

With Art

- 1967 Supernatural Fairy Tales

With Spooky Tooth

- 1968 It's All About
- 1969 Spooky Two
- 1970 Ceremony (with Pierre Henry)
- 1970 The Last Puff
- 1973 You Broke My Heart So I Busted Your Jaw
- 1973 Witness
- 1999 Cross Purpose
- 1999 The Best of Spooky Tooth: That Was Only Yesterday
- 2001 BBC Sessions
- 2007 Nomad Poets (DVD)

With the Hamburg Blues Band

- 2001 Touch - billed as "Mike Harrison meets The Hamburg Blues Band"
