= Spooky Tooth =

English rock band (principally 1967–1974)

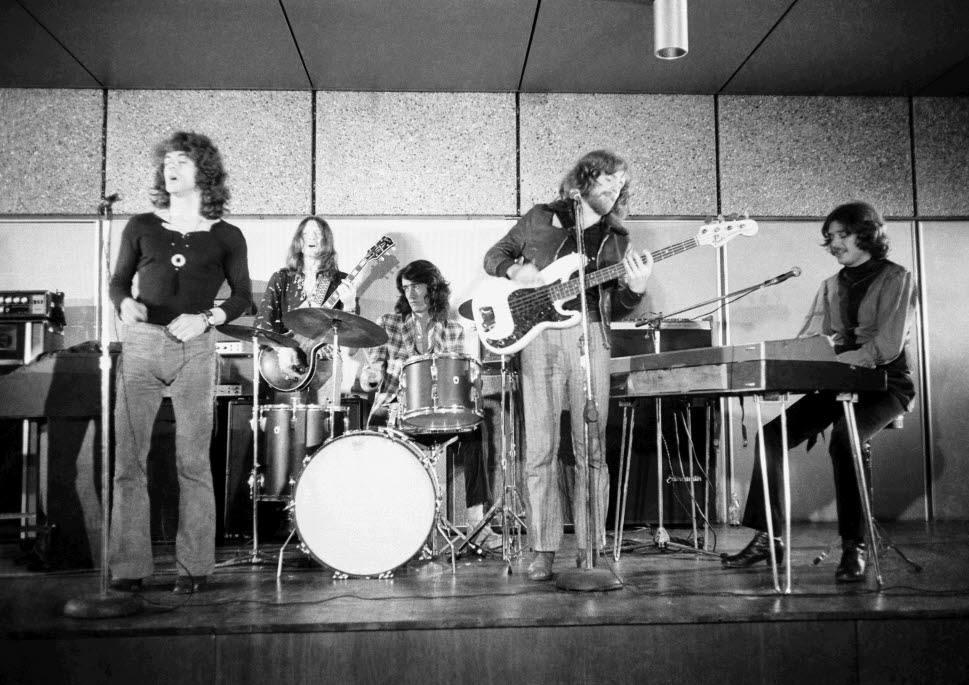
- On stage in 1969, Germany. L-R Mike Harrison, Luther Grosvenor, Mike Kellie, Andy Leigh, Gary Wright

Background information
- Origin: Carlisle, England
- Genres: Rock; blues rock; psychedelic rock
- Years active: 1967–1970; 1972–1974; 1998–1999; 2004; 2008–2009
- Labels: Island; CBS; A&M (U.S./Canada); Ruf
- Past members: Luther Grosvenor; Mike Harrison; Mike Kellie; Greg Ridley; Gary Wright; Andy Leigh; Henry McCullough; Alan Spenner; Chris Stainton; John Hawken; Steve Thompson; Bryson Graham; Ian Herbert; Mick Jones; Keith Ellis; Chris Stewart; Val Burke; Mike Patto; Joey Albrecht; Michael Becker; Steve Farris; Shem von Schroeck; Mark Andrews

Spooky Tooth were an English rock band formed in Carlisle in 1967. The band were principally active between 1967 and 1974, and re-formed several times in later years.

== History ==
Prior to Spooky Tooth, four of the band's five founding members had performed in the band Art (formerly known as the V.I.P.'s). Following the dissolution of Art, the members of that band's final line-up (guitarist Luther Grosvenor, vocalist Mike Harrison, drummer Mike Kellie and bassist Greg Ridley) joined forces with American keyboardist/vocalist Gary Wright in October 1967 and formed Spooky Tooth. Wright was introduced to the members of Art by Chris Blackwell, the founder of Island Records renowned for promoting progressive rock, roots reggae and dub music.

Their debut, It's All About, was released in June 1968 on Island Records and was produced by Jimmy Miller, who was also behind the boards for Spencer Davis Group, Motörhead, Traffic, the Rolling Stones and Blind Faith.

The second album, Spooky Two (March 1969), also produced by Miller, gained some attention in the rock press but, like the debut, failed to sell. It was the last album release by the original lineup and included their later classic version of the Larry Weiss penned "Evil Woman" and "Better by You, Better than Me", which was covered by Judas Priest on their release Stained Class (1978).

Ridley joined Humble Pie in 1969 and was replaced by Andy Leigh for the album Ceremony (December 1969). The experimental nature of Ceremony received mixed reviews and despite the project being instigated by Gary Wright, the album is considered by him to have ended the band's career. The record is described by another as being "one of the great screw-ups in rock history". As Wright describes it, "...We did a project that wasn't our album. It was with this French electronic music composer named Pierre Henry. We just told the label, 'You know this is his album, not our album. We'll play on it just like musicians.' And then when the album was finished, they said, 'Oh no no — it's great. We're gonna release this as your next album.' We said, 'You can't do that. It doesn't have anything to do with the direction of Spooky Two and it will ruin our career.' And that's exactly what happened."

Wright left the band following the release of the album. Harrison, Grosvenor and Kellie remained and recorded The Last Puff (July 1970) with members of Joe Cocker's Grease Band (guitarist Henry McCullough, keyboardist Chris Stainton and bassist Alan Spenner).

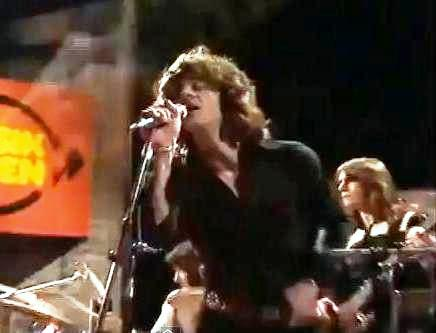
Singer Mike Harrison on stage with the band in the 1970s

In the autumn of 1970 the band embarked on a European tour that was undertaken with a line-up of Harrison, Grosvenor, Kellie, keyboardist John Hawken (ex-Nashville Teens) and bassist Steve Thompson. After this, the group disbanded, though Harrison and Wright reformed Spooky Tooth in September 1972 with a different line-up.

You Broke My Heart So I Busted Your Jaw was the first album by the reunited band, released in May 1973 on Island Records. Founding guitarist Grosvenor did not rejoin the band, as he had teamed up with Mott the Hoople, adopting the stage name of Ariel Bender. Grosvenor was succeeded by Mick Jones, while founding drummer Kellie was replaced by Bryson Graham. The bassist was Ian Herbert, then Chris Stewart.

For their next album, Witness (November 1973), original drummer Mike Kellie returned in place of Graham. Wright remained the dominant songwriter at this stage of the band's history. But co-lead singer Harrison left following the album's release and Mike Patto was the new vocalist, alongside Wright, when they recorded The Mirror (October 1974), which also included new bass player Val Burke and Bryson Graham back on drums. But the album's failure led to Wright leaving once again for a solo career and the group disbanding in November 1974.

Jon Milward summarized the band in The Rolling Stone Record Guide in 1979: "If ever there was a heavy band, Spooky Tooth had to be it. Featuring two vocalists prone to blues-wrenching extremes, and an instrumental attack comprising awesomely loud keyboards and guitars, Spooky Tooth came on like an overwhelming vat of premedicated goo." Noting their lack of commercial success, Milward concluded that the group "would remain the right band at the wrong time."

== After Spooky Tooth ==
Mick Jones went on to form Foreigner in 1976.

Grosvenor later played with Stealers Wheel and joined Mott the Hoople in the 1970s (replacing Mick Ralphs who left to form Bad Company), adopting the name Ariel Bender. In 2005, he founded the Ariel Bender Band, with which he still occasionally performs. In 2018 and 2019, he toured with a reformed Mott the Hoople.

Kellie later joined the Only Ones in the late 1970s, also performing with them in 1980s. The band reformed in 2007.

Ridley became a member of Humble Pie. On 19 November 2003 he died in Alicante, Spain, of pneumonia and resulting complications. He was 62.

Wright began to develop an international solo career in the 1970s and had a hit with "Dream Weaver".

Harrison, Grosvenor, Ridley and Kellie reunited as Spooky Tooth at points in 1997 and 1998, which resulted in the album Cross Purpose, released in February 1999.

Harrison played and recorded with the Hamburg Blues Band and appeared on their CD Touch (2002).

In June 2004, Harrison, Wright and Kellie were again re-united as Spooky Tooth with Joey Albrecht (guitar) and Michael Becker (bass) for two concerts in Germany, resulting in a DVD Nomad Poets (2007).

In 2006, Harrison released his first solo album in over thirty years, Late Starter.

In February 2008, the latest incarnation of Spooky Tooth, featuring Harrison, Wright and Kellie, along with guitarist Steve Farris from Mr. Mister and Shem von Schroeck (bass), played a series of European dates. On 29 May 2009, this same lineup (with drummer Tom Brechtlein replacing Kellie) played at Island Records' 50th Anniversary at Shepherd's Bush Empire, before touring Germany that June.

In 2012, Mike Kellie started work on a solo album. Kellie died on 18 January 2017 at the age of 69 after a short illness, and Mike Harrison died on 25 March 2018 at the age of 72. Wright died on September 4, 2023, at his home in California at the age of 80. In his final years, he had been suffering from Parkinson’s disease and Lewy body dementia.

== Media depictions ==
The band were featured in the 1970 documentary Groupies.

== Personnel ==
- Mike Harrison – vocals, keyboards (1967–1970, 1972–1974, 1998–1999, 2004, 2008–2009; died 2018)
- Mike Kellie – drums (1967–1970, 1973–1974, 1998–1999, 2004, 2008–2009; died 2017)
- Luther Grosvenor – guitar (1967–1970, 1998–1999)
- Gary Wright – keyboards, vocals (1967–1970, 1972–1974, 2004, 2008–2009; died 2023)
- Greg Ridley – bass (1967–1969, 1998–1999; died 2003)
- Andy Leigh – bass (1969–1970)
- Henry McCullough – guitar (1970; died 2016)
- Alan Spenner – bass (1970; died 1991)
- Chris Stainton – keyboards, guitar, bass (1970)
- John Hawken – keyboards (1970; died 2024)
- Steve Thompson – bass (1970)
- Mick Jones – guitar (1972–1974)
- Ian Herbert – bass (1972–1973)
- Bryson Graham – drums (1972–1973, 1974; died 1993)
- Chris Stewart – bass (1973–1974; died 2020)
- Val Burke – bass, vocals (1974)
- Mike Patto – vocals, keyboards (1974; died 1979)
- Joey Albrecht – guitar (2004)
- Michael Becker – bass (2004)
- Steve Farris – guitar (2008–2009)
- Shem von Schroeck – bass (2008–2009)
- Tom Brechtlein – drums (2009)

=== Line-ups ===
1967 – 1969	1969 – 1970	1970	1970
Luther Grosvenor – guitar; Mike Harrison – vocals, keyboards; Mike Kellie – drums; Greg Ridley – bass; Gary Wright – keyboards, vocals	Luther Grosvenor – guitar; Mike Harrison – vocals, keyboards; Mike Kellie – drums; Gary Wright – keyboards, vocals; Andy Leigh – bass	Luther Grosvenor – guitar; Mike Harrison – vocals, keyboards; Mike Kellie – drums; Henry McCullough – guitar; Alan Spenner – bass; Chris Stainton – keyboards, guitar, bass	Luther Grosvenor – guitar; Mike Harrison – vocals, keyboards; Mike Kellie – drums; John Hawken – keyboards; Steve Thompson – bass
1970 – 1972	1972 – 1973	1973 – 1974	1974
Disbanded	Mike Harrison – vocals, keyboards; Bryson Graham – drums; Ian Herbert – bass; Mick Jones – guitar; Gary Wright – keyboards, vocals	Mike Harrison – vocals, keyboards; Mick Jones – guitar; Gary Wright – keyboards, vocals; Mike Kellie – drums; Chris Stewart – bass	Mick Jones – guitar; Gary Wright – keyboards, vocals; Val Burke – bass, vocals; Bryson Graham – drums; Mike Patto – vocals, keyboards
1974 – 1998	1998 – 1999	1999 – 2004	2004
Disbanded	Luther Grosvenor – guitar; Mike Harrison – vocals, keyboards; Mike Kellie – drums; Greg Ridley – bass	Disbanded	Mike Harrison – vocals, keyboards; Mike Kellie – drums; Joey Albrecht – guitar; Michael Becker – bass; Gary Wright – keyboards, vocals
2004 – 2008	2008 – 2009	2009	2010 – 2020
Disbanded	Mike Harrison – vocals, keyboards; Mike Kellie – drums; Gary Wright – keyboards, vocals; Steve Farris – guitar; Shem von Schroeck – bass	Mike Harrison – vocals, keyboards; Gary Wright – keyboards, vocals; Steve Farris – guitar; Shem von Schroeck – bass; Tom Brechtlein – drums	Disbanded

== Discography ==
=== Studio albums ===
- It's All About (1968) – re-issued in 1971 as Tobacco Road, with the song "The Weight" replacing "Too Much of Nothing"
- Spooky Two (1969) – US No. 44; CAN No. 48
- Ceremony (1969, with Pierre Henry) – US No. 92
- The Last Puff (1970, credited as Spooky Tooth featuring Mike Harrison) – US No. 84; CAN N. 70
- You Broke My Heart So I Busted Your Jaw (1973) – US No. 84; CAN No. 58
- Witness (1973) – US No. 99
- The Mirror (1974) – US No. 130; CAN No. 88
- Cross Purpose (1999)

=== Compilations, live and other albums ===
- Tobacco Road (1971) – US No. 152 (reissue of It's All About with one different track)
- Gary Wright & Spooky Tooth: That Was Only Yesterday (1973) – US No. 172
- The Best of Spooky Tooth (produced by Island Records ILPS9368-A, imported by Jem Records, 1975)
- That Was Only Yesterday – An Introduction To Spooky Tooth (1999)
- Comic Violence (2000) – CD reissue, originally released as The Mirror
- BBC Sessions (2001)
- Nomad Poets - Live in Germany CD/DVD (2007)
- Lost in My Dream – An Anthology 1968–1974 (2009)

=== Singles ===
- "The Weight" (1968) – cover of The Band's single
- "Sunshine Help Me" (1968) – US Cash Box No. 126
- "Feelin' Bad" (1969) – US Bubbling Under No. 132
- "I Am the Walrus" (1970) – NLD No. 38
- "Fantasy Satisfier/The Hoofer" (1974) – UK Goodear Records EAR607A
