= List of Fairport Convention members =

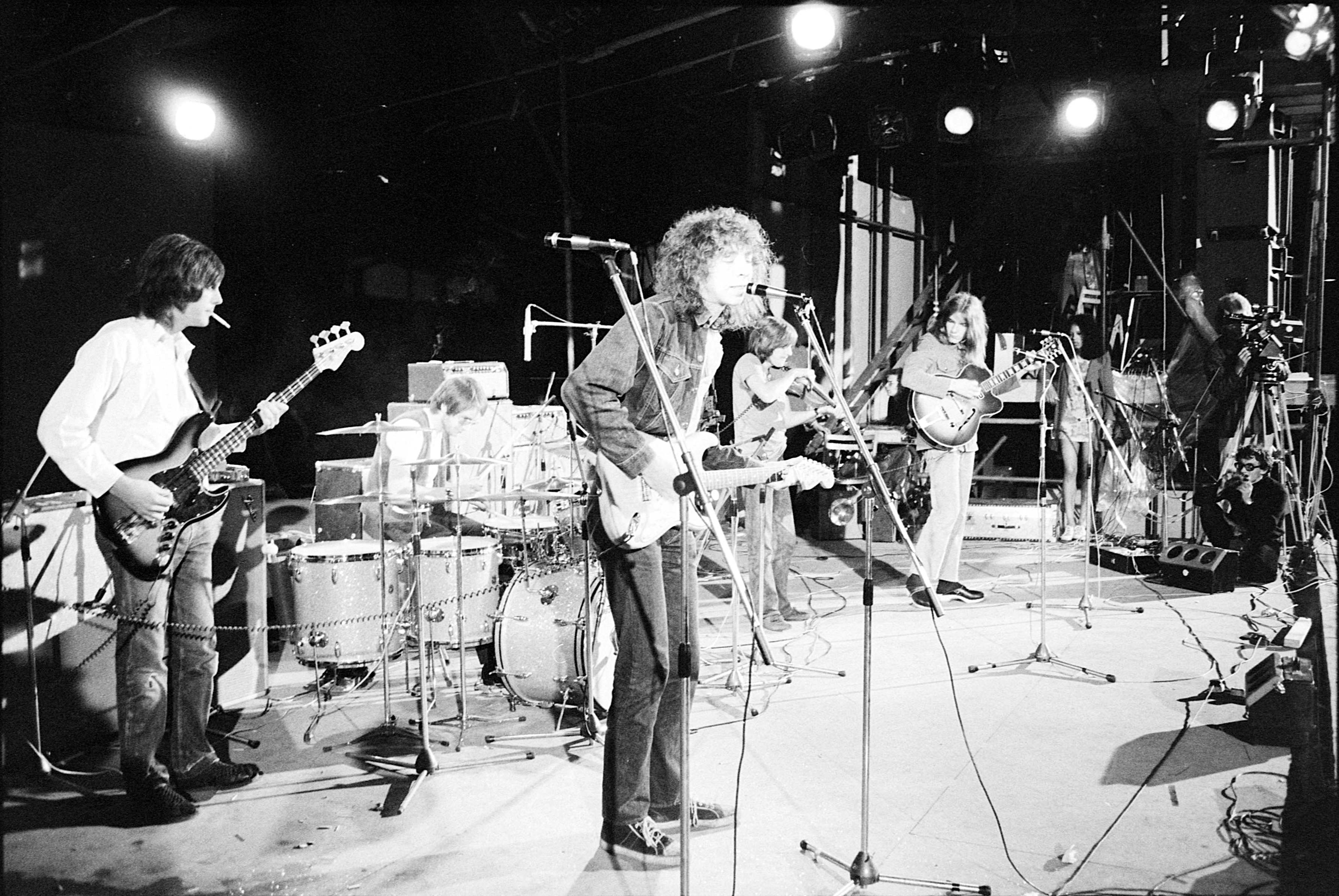
(left to right) Dave Pegg, Dave Mattacks, Richard Thompson, Dave Swarbrick and Simon Nicol.

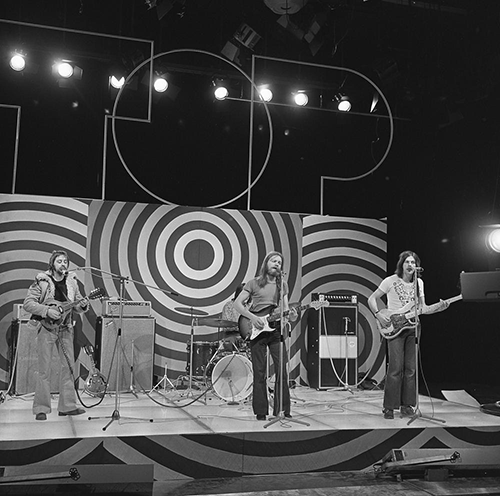
(left to right) Dave Swarbrick, Tom Farnell (obscured), Roger Hill, Dave Pegg.

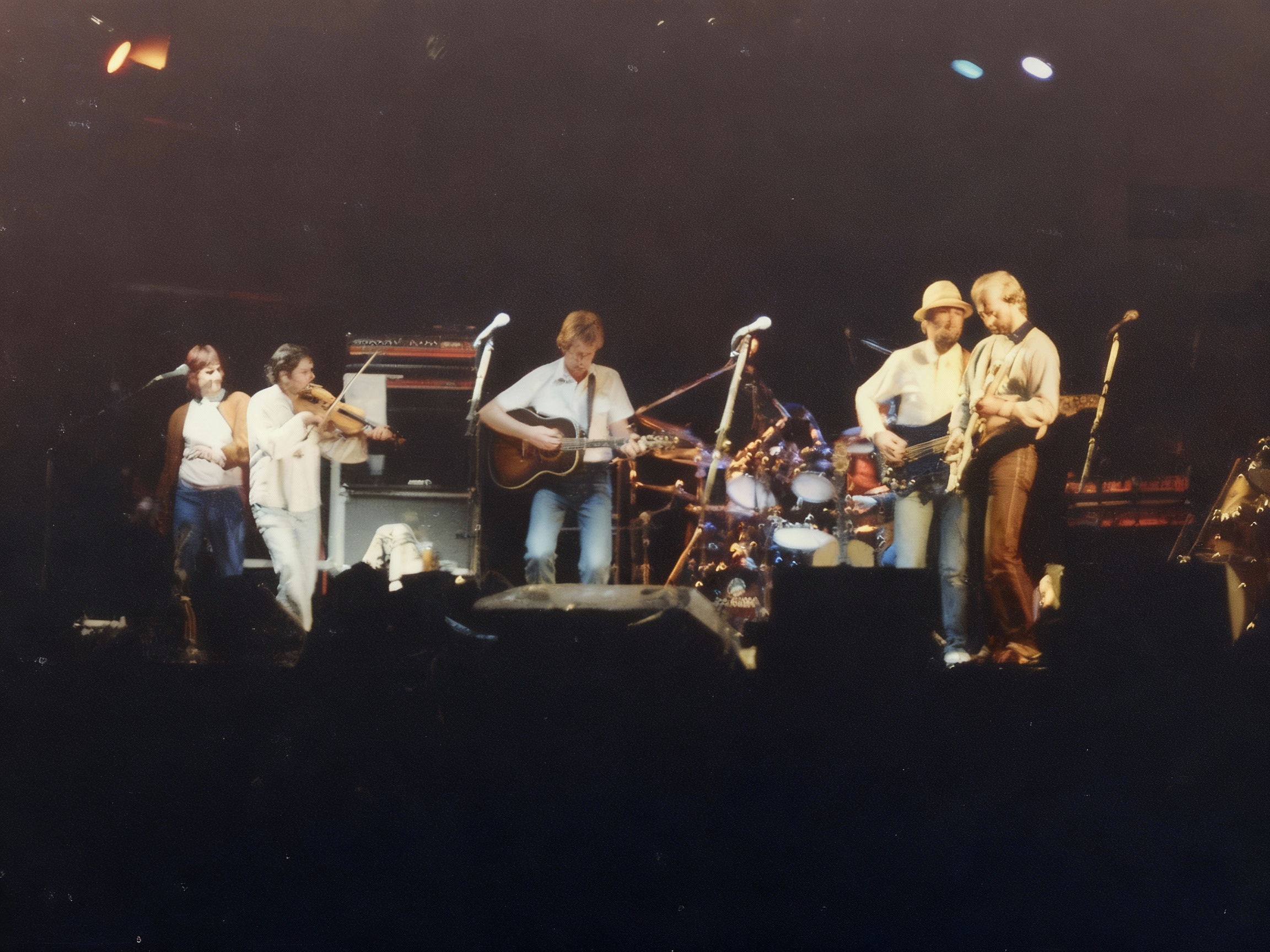
(left to right) Linda Thompson (guest), Dave Swarbrick, Trevor Lucas, Dave Mattacks (obscured), Dave Pegg, Jerry Donahue.

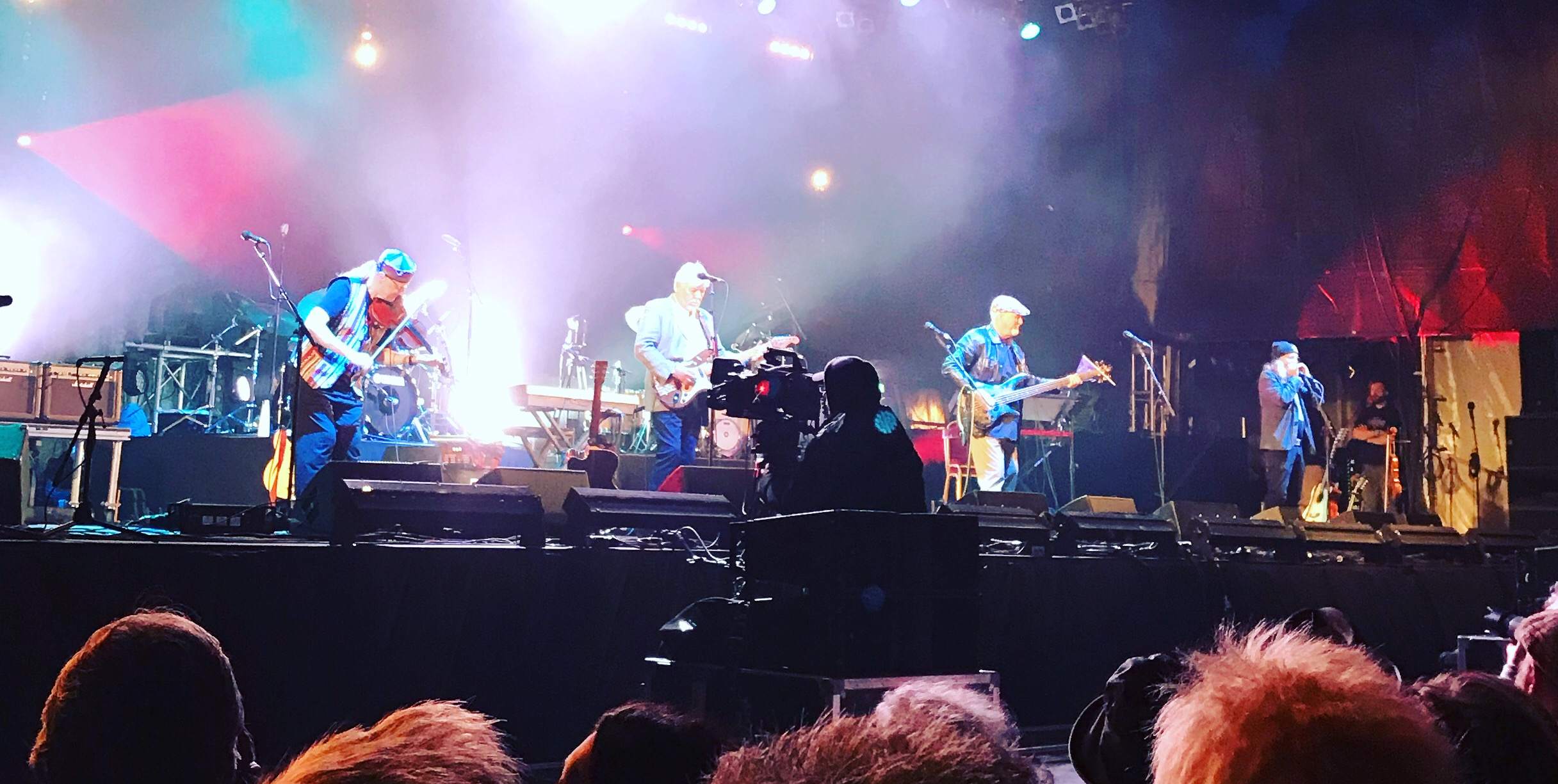
(left to right) Ric Sanders, Gerry Conway (obscured), Simon Nicol, Dave Pegg and Chris Leslie

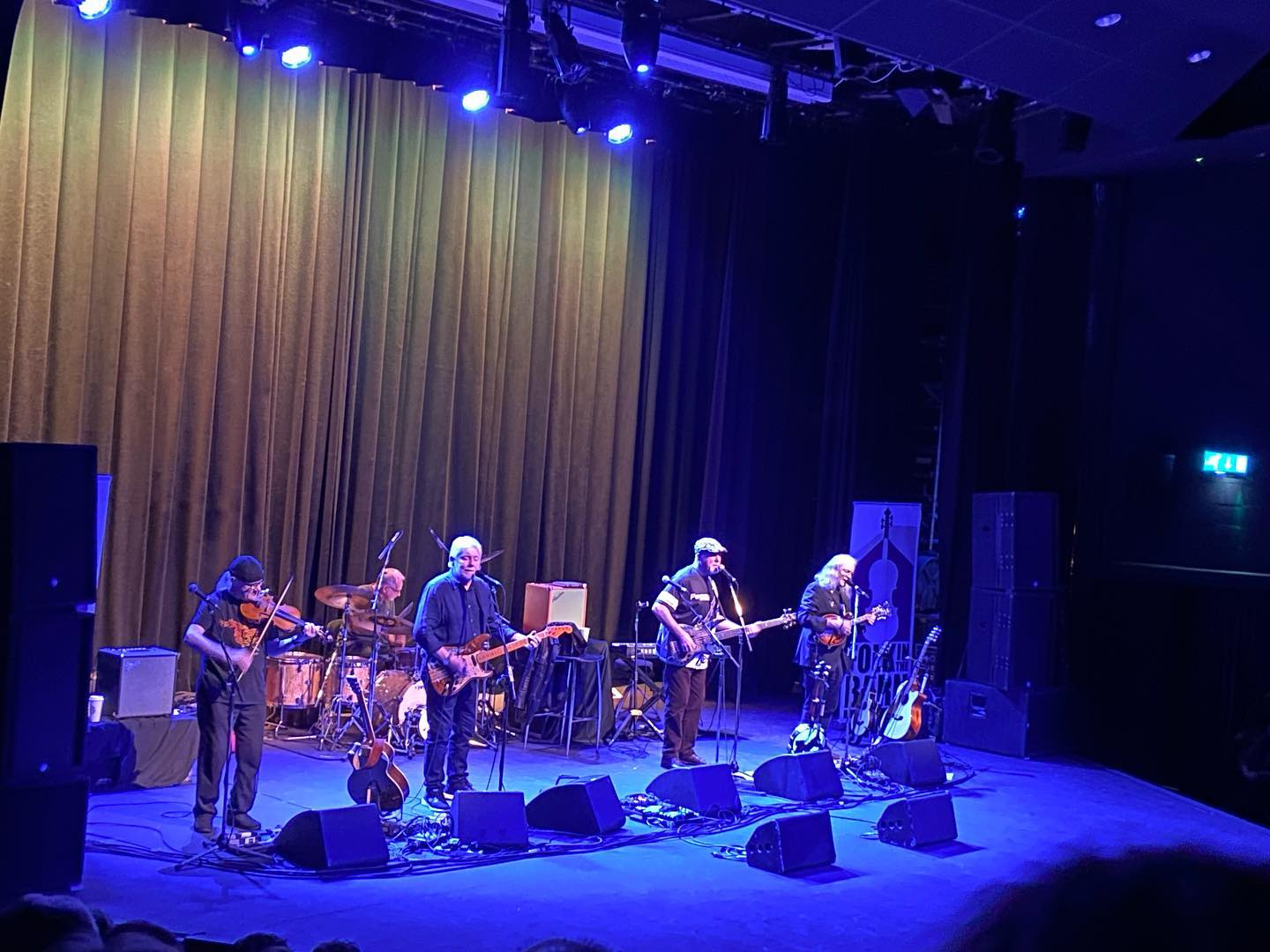
(left to right) Ric Sanders, Dave Mattacks, Simon Nicol, Dave Pegg and Chris Leslie

Five line-ups of Fairport Convention performing in 1970, 1972, 1982, 2019 and 2023

Fairport Convention are an English folk rock band formed by guitarists Richard Thompson and Simon Nicol, bassist Ashley Hutchings and drummer Shaun Frater (Frater replaced by Martin Lamble after their first gig.) The band currently consists of Nicol, drummer Dave Mattacks (who first joined in 1969), bassist Dave Pegg (since 1969) fiddler Ric Sanders (since 1985) and multi-instrumentalist Chris Leslie (since 1996).

== History ==
Bassist Ashley Hutchings met guitarist Simon Nicol in North London in 1966 when they both played in the Ethnic Shuffle Orchestra. They rehearsed on the floor above Nicol's father's medical practice in a house called "Fairport" on Fortis Green in Muswell Hill – the same street on which Ray and Dave Davies of the Kinks grew up. The house name lent its name to the group they formed together as Fairport Convention in 1967 with Richard Thompson on guitar and Shaun Frater on drums. After their initial performance at St Michael's Church Hall in Golders Green on 27 May 1967, they had their first of many line-up changes as one member of the audience, drummer Martin Lamble, convinced the band that he could do a better job than Frater and replaced him. They soon added a female singer, Judy Dyble, which gave them a distinctive sound among the many London bands of the period.

Fairport Convention were soon playing regularly at underground venues such as UFO and The Electric Garden, which later became the Middle Earth club. After only a few months, they caught the attention of manager Joe Boyd who secured them a contract with Polydor Records. Boyd suggested they augment the line-up with another male vocalist. Singer Iain Matthews (then known as Ian MacDonald) joined the band, and their first album, Fairport Convention, was recorded in late 1967 and released in June 1968.

After disappointing album sales they signed a new contract with Island Records. Before their next recording Judy Dyble left – she described it as being "unceremoniously dumped" – and was replaced by the band with Sandy Denny, a folk singer who had previously recorded as a soloist and with Strawbs. Denny's distinctive voice, described by Clive James as "open space, low-volume, high-intensity", is one of the characteristics of two albums released in 1969: What We Did on Our Holidays and Unhalfbricking. These recordings marked the growth of much greater musicality and song-writing ability among the band.

During the recording of Unhalfbricking, Matthews left after having sung on only one song, eventually to form Matthews Southern Comfort. He was not replaced; the other male members covered his vocal parts. The album featured a guest appearance by Birmingham folk fiddler Dave Swarbrick on a recording of "A Sailor's Life", a traditional song brought to the band by Denny from her folk club days. In 1969 four members of the band, one uncredited and three with pseudonyms, featured as backing musicians on the album Love Chronicles by Scottish folk artist Al Stewart.

On 12 May 1969, on the way home from a gig at Birmingham venue Mothers, Fairport's van crashed on the M1 motorway. Martin Lamble, aged only nineteen, and Jeannie Franklyn, Richard Thompson's girlfriend, were killed. The rest of the band suffered injuries of varying severity. They nearly decided to disband. However, they reconvened with Dave Mattacks taking over drumming duties and Dave Swarbrick, having made contribution to Unhalfbricking, now joined as a full member. Boyd set the band up in a rented house in Farley Chamberlayne near Winchester in Hampshire, where they recuperated and worked on the integration of British folk music into rock and roll, which would result in the fourth album Liege & Lief.

Usually considered the highpoint of the band's long career, Liege & Lief was a huge leap forward in concept and musicality. The album consisted of six traditional tracks and three original compositions in a similar style. Disagreements arose about the direction of the band in the wake of this success. Ashley Hutchings wanted to explore more traditional material and left to form two groups that would rival Fairport for significance in English folk rock: Steeleye Span and the Albion Band. Sandy Denny also left to found her own group Fotheringay. Dave Pegg took over on bass guitar and has been the group's one constant ever since, in an unbroken membership of over four decades. The band made no serious attempt to replace Denny, and, although she would briefly return, the sound of the band would now be characterized by male vocals.

Despite these changes the band produced another album, Full House (1970), which was remarkably successful as a project. Like its predecessor, it combined traditional songs, including a powerful rendition of "Sir Patrick Spens", with original compositions. The latter benefited from the writing partnership of Thompson and Swarbrick, most obviously on "Walk Awhile", which would become a concert favourite. Despite the loss of Denny the band still possessed four vocalists, including the emerging voices of Nicol and Swarbrick, whose tones would dominate the sound of this period.

In the recurring pattern, soon after the album's release Thompson left the band to pursue other projects and eventually his solo career. This left Simon Nicol as the only original member and Dave Swarbrick emerged as the leading force in the band. In 1970 the members and their families had moved into The Angel, a former pub in Hertfordshire and this inspired the next album Angel Delight (1971) the band's first to chart in the US, peaking at number 200 on the Billboard 200 and their only top ten album in the UK. The next project was an ambitious folk-rock opera developed by Swarbrick, based on the life of John "Babbacombe" Lee, "the man they couldn't hang" and released with the title Babbacombe Lee (1971).

These two albums were also notable as the first time that Fairport had recorded consecutively with the same line-up, but inevitably stability did not last: Simon Nicol left early in late 1971 to join Ashley Hutchings' Albion Band and he was soon followed by Mattacks. Only Pegg and Swarbrick remained and the following few years have been dubbed 'Fairport confusion' as a bewildering sequence of band members came and went, during this time in 1972 a lineup of Swarbrick, Pegg with Roger Hill (guitar, vocals) and Tom Farnell (drums) performed, but by 1973 Mattacks had returned and two former members of Sandy Denny's Fotheringay had joined the band, Denny's Australian husband Trevor Lucas on vocals and guitar and American Jerry Donahue on lead guitar. From these line-ups the band produced two studio albums: Rosie, notable for the Swarbrick penned title track (1973) and Nine (1974), the ninth studio album by the band. The last of these contained writing contributions by Lucas to five of the nine tracks, which together with Donahue's country influences and outstanding guitar pyrotechnics gave the album a very distinctive feel.

Denny rejoined the band in 1974 and there were considerable expectations, both artistic and commercial, placed on this line-up. Denny was featured on the album Rising for the Moon (1975), which became the band's highest US chart album when it reached number 143 on the Billboard 200 and the first album to reach the top one-hundred in the UK since Angel Delight, reaching no 52. During the Rising sessions, Mattacks fell out with producer Glyn Johns and was replaced by former Grease Band drummer Bruce Rowland. Poor UK sales for Rising did not aid morale and, despite the relative success of the line-up, Lucas and Donahue left the band, as did Denny in 1976. She died aged 31, in 1978, of a cerebral haemorrhage after falling down a flight of stairs.

Rowland, Pegg, and Swarbrick fulfilled their remaining contractual obligations to Island Records by turning what had originally been a Swarbrick solo effort into the album Gottle O'Geer (1976) under the name 'Fairport' (as opposed to Fairport Convention) in the UK, and as 'Fairport featuring Dave Swarbrick' in the US, and with various session players and production by Simon Nicol, who subsequently rejoined the band. They then signed with Vertigo, but record sales continued to decline and after producing two of four contracted albums, The Bonny Bunch of Roses (1977) and Tipplers Tales (1978), Vertigo bought them out of their contract. It is claimed by members of the band that this was the only recording money they had seen up to that point.

By 1979 the mainstream market for folk rock had largely disappeared, the band had no record deal, and Dave Swarbrick had been diagnosed with tinnitus, which made loud electric gigs increasingly difficult. Fairport decided to disband. They played a farewell tour and a final outdoor concert on 4 August in Cropredy, the Oxfordshire village where Dave and Christine Pegg lived. The finality of this occasion was mitigated by the announcement that the band would meet for a reunion. In August 1979, the band played at Knebworth Festival in England. The headline act at both their appearances at the festival, over two consecutive Saturdays on 4 and 11 August, were Led Zeppelin.

No record company wanted to release the live recordings of the tour and concert, so the Peggs founded Woodworm Records, which would be the major outlet for the band in the future. Members continued to take part in occasional gigs, particularly in festivals in continental Europe, and after a year they staged a reunion concert in Cropredy which became the annual Cropredy Festival. Over the next few years, it grew rapidly and emerged as the major mechanism for sustaining the band. In August 1981, the band held their annual reunion concert at Broughton Castle, rather than the usual Cropredy location. The concert was recorded, and released on the 1982 album Moat on the Ledge.

The Angel Delight lineup of Simon Nicol, Dave Swarbrick, Dave Pegg, and Dave Mattacks played a number of gigs in the UK in the early 80s, then toured extensively in the UK and the US in 1984 and 1985. Band alumni like Richard Thompson and Bruce Rowland would occasionally join in.

In 1985, Pegg, Nicol and Mattacks found that they all had some free time and an available studio belonging to Pegg. They decided that they needed some new material to add to the catalogue that had been suspended in 1978. As Swarbrick was unavailable, the selection of traditional tunes was more difficult than for past albums and there was a need for a replacement fiddle player and some vocals. Pegg and Nicol took over arranging duties on an instrumental medley and the band turned to sometime Albion Band members: jazz and folk violinist Ric Sanders and singer-songwriter Cathy Lesurf. They also had the help of ex-member Richard Thompson. Thompson and Lesurf contributed songs and took part in the recordings. Also important to the album was Ralph McTell who contributed one song and co-wrote one track each with Nicol and Mattacks; the former of these, "The Hiring Fair", would become a stage fixture of the future Fairport.

The resulting album Gladys' Leap (1985) was generally well received in the music and national press, but caused some tension with Swarbrick who refused to play any of the new material at the 1985 Cropredy Festival. Nevertheless, the decision to reform the band, without Swarbrick, was taken by the other three remaining members. Ric Sanders was invited to join, along with guitarist, composer, arranger and multi-instrumentalist Maartin Allcock. Nicol, with his developing baritone voice, took over the main share of the vocal duties. This line-up was to last eleven years, the longest period of membership stability in the band's history so far.

The new band began a hectic schedule of performing in Britain and the world and prepared material for a new album. The result was the all-instrumental Expletive Delighted! (1986). This showcased the virtuosity of Sanders and Allcock, but perhaps inevitably was not popular with all fans. This was followed by the recording In Real Time: Live '87 which managed to capture the energy and power of the new Fairport on stage, despite the fact that it was recorded in the studio with audience reactions dubbed on.

In this period the band were playing to larger and larger audiences, both on tour and at Cropredy, and it was very productive in terms of recording. Fairport had the considerable composing and arranging skills of Allcock and, to fill the gap created by a lack of a songwriter in the band, they turned to some of the most talented available in the contemporary folk scene. The results were Red & Gold (1989) The Five Seasons (1990) and Jewel in the Crown (1995), the last of which was judged "their bestselling and undoubtedly finest album in years."

At this point, with Mattacks busy with other projects, the band shifted to an acoustic format for touring and released the unplugged Old New Borrowed Blue as "Fairport Acoustic Convention" in 1996. For a while the four-piece acoustic line-up ran in parallel with the electric format. When Allcock left the band, he was replaced by Chris Leslie on vocals, mandolin and fiddle, who formerly worked with Swarbrick in Whippersnapper, and had a one-off stint with the band replacing Ric Sanders for 1992 Cropredy Festival. This meant that for the first time since reforming, the band had a recognized songwriter who contributed significantly to the band's output on the next album Who Knows Where the Time Goes? (1997), particularly the rousing "John Gaudie". By the time of the 30th anniversary Festival at Cropredy in 1997, the new Fairport had been in existence for over a decade and contributed a significant chapter to the history of the band.

Dave Mattacks moved to the US in 1998, and Gerry Conway took over on drums and percussion. Fairport produced two more studio albums for Woodworm Records: The Wood and the Wire (2000) and XXXV (2002). Then, for Over the Next Hill (2004). 2007 was their fortieth anniversary year and they celebrated by releasing a new album, Sense of Occasion. They performed the whole of the Liege & Lief album live at Cropredy, since 2004 renamed Fairport's Cropredy Convention, featuring the 1969 line-up of Dave Swarbrick, Ashley Hutchings, Dave Mattacks, Simon Nicol and Richard Thompson, with singer-songwriter Chris While taking the place of Sandy Denny. Footage of the festival, although not the Liege and Lief performance, was released as part of a celebratory DVD.

In 2011, the band released a new studio album Festival Bell, the first new album in four years. This was followed in 2012 by Babbacombe Lee Live Again recorded live during the 2011 tour revisiting the Babbacombe Lee album first issued in 1971. In 2012, the band also released By Popular Request, a reworking in the studio of a number of the most popular songs in the band's repertoire (as determined by a mysterious consultation and voting process conducted by the band with its fans).

As of 2020 the band still continue to write and record music, regularly producing new studio albums, the most recent releases being 2015's Myths and Heroes, 2017's 50:50@50 and 2020's Shuffle and Go. The COVID-19 pandemic impacted significantly on their ability to tour, and their 2022 tour was initially cut short after several of the touring team developed COVID.

In 2022, Gerry Conway made the decision to leave the band after 24 years, and it was announced that the band would continue as a four piece. On the bands Winter 2023 UK Tour they were joined by a returning Mattacks on drums and percussion, whether he is joining the band full time is unknown.

== Members ==
=== Current members ===
Image	Name	Years active	Instruments	Release contributions
	Simon Nicol	1967–1971; 1976–1979; 1985–present	lead vocals; guitar; dulcimer; keyboards; occasional violin	all releases except Rosie (1973), Nine (1973), Fairport Live Convention (1974), Rising for the Moon (1975)
	Dave Mattacks	1969–1972; 1973–1975; 1985–1997; 2023–present (touring)	drums; percussion; keyboards; bass guitar	all releases from Liege & Lief (1969) to Rising for the Moon (1975), and from Gladys' Leap (1985) to Who Knows Where the Time Goes? (1997), except Jewel in the Crown (1995); Unhalfbricking (1969) one bonus track
	Dave Pegg	1969–1979; 1985–present	bass guitar; mandolin; vocals; guitar; fiddle; drums	all releases from Full House (1970) to present
	Ric Sanders	1985–present	fiddles; keyboards; ukulele; backing vocals	all releases from Gladys' Leap (1985) to present
	Chris Leslie	1996–present	mandolin; fiddle; bouzouki; vocals; guitar; flute	all releases from Who Knows Where the Time Goes (1996) to present

=== Former members ===
Image	Name	Years active	Instruments	Release contributions
	Richard Thompson	1967–1971	guitar; mandolin; keyboards; dulcimer; vocals	all releases from Fairport Convention (1968) to Full House (1970), Angel Delight (1971) bonus track, Rosie (1973) (session); Moat on the Ledge: Live at Broughton Castle, August '81 (1982); Gladys' Leap (1985); Expletive Delighted! (1986); Who Knows Where the Time Goes (1997); Live at the L.A. Troubadour (1977); House Full: Live at the L.A. Troubadour (1986)
	Ashley Hutchings	1967–1969	bass guitar; double bass; backing vocals	Fairport Convention (1968); What We Did on Our Holidays (1969); Unhalfbricking (1969); Liege & Lief (1969)
	Shaun Frater	1967	drums	none
	Martin Lamble	1967–1969 (until his death)	drums; percussion; fiddle	Fairport Convention (1968); What We Did on Our Holidays (1969); Unhalfbricking (1969); Over the Next Hill (2004) (archival recording)
	Judy Dyble	1967–1968 (died 2020)	vocals; autoharp; piano; recorder	Fairport Convention (1968); Moat on the Ledge: Live at Broughton Castle, August '81 (1982)
	Iain Matthews	1967–1969	vocals; percussion	Fairport Convention (1968); What We Did on Our Holidays (1969); Unhalfbricking (1969) one track
	Sandy Denny	1968–1969; 1974–1975 (died 1978)	vocals; guitar; keyboards	What We Did on Our Holidays (1969); Unhalfbricking (1969); Liege & Lief (1969); "Babbacombe" Lee (1971) bonus track; Rosie (1973) (session); Fairport Live Convention (1974); Rising for the Moon (1975)
	Dave Swarbrick	1969–1979 (died 2016)	fiddle; mandolin; vocals; guitar	all releases from Unhalfbricking (1969) (session) to Moat on the Ledge – Live at Broughton Castle (1982); The Airing Cupboard Tapes (2002)
	Roger Hill	1971–1972 (died 2011)	guitar; vocals	none
	Tom Farnell	1972	drums	none
	David Rea	1972 (died 2011)	guitar	none
	Trevor Lucas	1972–1975 (died 1989)	guitar; vocals	Unhalfbricking (1969) (session); Rosie (1973); Nine (1973); Fairport Live Convention (1974); Rising for the Moon (1975)
	Jerry Donahue	1972–1975	guitar; backing vocals	"Babbacombe" Lee (1971) bonus tracks; Rosie (1973); Nine (1973); Fairport Live Convention (1974); Rising for the Moon (1975); Expletive Delighted! (1986)
	Paul Warren	1975	drums	none
	Bruce Rowland	1975–1979 (died 2015)	drums; percussion; keyboards; backing vocals; bass guitar	Rising for the Moon (1975); Gottle O'Geer (1976); The Bonny Bunch of Roses (1977); Tipplers Tales (1978); Farewell, Farewell (1979); Moat on the Ledge: Live at Broughton Castle, August '81 (1982)
	Dan Ar Braz	1976	guitar; vocals	none
	Bob Brady	1976	piano; vocals	Gottle O'Geer (1976)
	Roger Burridge	1976 (died 2020)	mandolin; fiddle; backing vocals	Gottle O'Geer (1976)
	Maartin Allcock	1985–1996 (died 2018)	guitar; mandolin; keyboards; vocals	all releases from Expletive Delighted! (1986) to Old New Borrowed Blue (1996)
	Gerry Conway	1998–2022 (died 2024)	drums; percussion	Rosie (1973) (session); all releases from Who Knows Where the Time Goes? (1997) to Shuffle and Go (2020)

== Lineups ==
Period	Members	Releases
1967	Shaun Frater – drums; Ashley Hutchings – bass guitar; Simon Nicol – guitar, vocals; Richard Thompson – guitar, vocals	none – one performance only
1967	Ashley Hutchings – bass guitar; Simon Nicol – guitar, vocals; Richard Thompson – guitar, vocals; Martin Lamble – drums, fiddle	
1967	Ashley Hutchings – bass guitar; Simon Nicol – guitar, backing vocals; Richard Thompson – guitar, vocals; Martin Lamble – drums, fiddle; Judy Dyble – vocals, autoharp, piano, recorder	
1967–1968	Ashley Hutchings – bass guitar; Simon Nicol – guitar, backing vocals; Richard Thompson – guitar, vocals; Martin Lamble – drums, fiddle; Judy Dyble – vocals, autoharp, piano, recorder; Iain Matthews – vocals	Fairport Convention (1968)
1968–1969	Ashley Hutchings – bass guitar; Simon Nicol – guitar, backing vocals; Richard Thompson – guitar, vocals; Martin Lamble – drums, fiddle; Iain Matthews – vocals; Sandy Denny – vocals, guitar, keyboards	What We Did on Our Holidays (1969); Unhalfbricking (1969) one track
1969	Ashley Hutchings – bass guitar; Simon Nicol – guitar, backing vocals; Richard Thompson – guitar, vocals; Martin Lamble – drums, fiddle; Sandy Denny – vocals, guitar, keyboards	Unhalfbricking (1969) remaining tracks
1969	Ashley Hutchings – bass guitar; Simon Nicol – guitar, backing vocals; Richard Thompson – guitar, vocals; Sandy Denny – vocals, guitar, keyboards; Dave Mattacks – drums, keyboards, bass guitar; Dave Swarbrick – fiddle, mandolin, vocals	Liege & Lief (1969)
1969–1971	Simon Nicol – guitar, vocals; Richard Thompson – guitar, vocals; Dave Mattacks – drums, keyboards, bass guitar; Dave Swarbrick – fiddle, mandolin, vocals; Dave Pegg – bass guitar, mandolin, backing vocals	Full House (1970); Angel Delight (1971) – bonus track; Live at the L.A. Troubadour (1977); House Full: Live at the L.A. Troubadour (1986)
1971	Simon Nicol – guitar, vocals; Dave Mattacks – drums, keyboards, bass guitar; Dave Swarbrick – fiddle, mandolin, vocals; Dave Pegg – bass guitar, mandolin, backing vocals	Angel Delight (1971) – original tracks; "Babbacombe" Lee (1971); The Airing Cupboard Tapes (2002)
1971–1972	Dave Mattacks – drums, keyboards, bass guitar; Dave Swarbrick – fiddle, mandolin, vocals; Dave Pegg – bass guitar, mandolin, backing vocals; Roger Hill – guitar, vocals	none
1972	Dave Swarbrick – fiddle, mandolin, vocals; Dave Pegg – bass guitar, mandolin, backing vocals; Roger Hill – guitar, vocals; Tom Farnell – drums	none
1972	Dave Swarbrick – fiddle, mandolin, vocals; Dave Pegg – bass guitar, mandolin, backing vocals; Tom Farnell – drums; David Rea – guitar	none
1972–1974	Dave Swarbrick – fiddle, mandolin, vocals; Dave Pegg – bass guitar, mandolin, backing vocals; Jerry Donahue – guitar, backing vocals; Trevor Lucas – guitar, vocals; Dave Mattacks – drums, keyboards, bass guitar	Rosie (1973); Nine (1973); The Airing Cupboard Tapes (2002)
1974–1975	Dave Swarbrick – fiddle, mandolin, vocals; Dave Pegg – bass guitar, mandolin, backing vocals; Jerry Donahue – guitar, backing vocals; Trevor Lucas – guitar, vocals; Dave Mattacks – drums, keyboards, bass guitar; Sandy Denny – vocals, piano	Fairport Live Convention (1974); Rising for the Moon (1975) five tracks; The Airing Cupboard Tapes (2002)
1975	Dave Swarbrick – fiddle, mandolin, vocals; Dave Pegg – bass guitar, mandolin, backing vocals; Jerry Donahue – guitar, backing vocals; Trevor Lucas – guitar, vocals; Sandy Denny – vocals, piano; Paul Warren – drums	
1975	Dave Swarbrick – fiddle, mandolin, vocals; Dave Pegg – bass guitar, mandolin, backing vocals; Jerry Donahue – guitar, vocals; Trevor Lucas – guitar, vocals; Sandy Denny – vocals, piano; Bruce Rowland – drums, keyboards, backing vocals	Rising for the Moon (1975) seven tracks; Who Knows? 1975 (2007)
1975–1976	Dave Swarbrick – fiddle, mandolin, vocals; Dave Pegg – bass guitar, mandolin, backing vocals; Sandy Denny – vocals, piano; Bruce Rowland – drums, keyboards, backing vocals	
1976	Dave Swarbrick – fiddle, mandolin, vocals, guitar; Dave Pegg – bass guitar, mandolin, backing vocals, guitar; Bruce Rowland – drums, keyboards, backing vocals	Gottle O'Geer (1976)
1976	Dave Swarbrick – fiddle, mandolin, vocals; Dave Pegg – bass guitar, mandolin, backing vocals; Bruce Rowland – drums, keyboards, backing vocals; Bob Brady – piano, vocals; Dan Ar Braz – guitar, vocals; Roger Burridge – mandolin, fiddle	
1976–1979	Dave Swarbrick – fiddle, mandolin, vocals; Dave Pegg – bass guitar, mandolin, backing vocals; Bruce Rowland – drums, keyboards, backing vocals, bass guitar; Simon Nicol – guitar, vocals, keyboards	The Bonny Bunch of Roses (1977); Tipplers Tales (1978); Farewell, Farewell (1979); Encore, encore (1997)
1979–1985	Officially disbanded. However, Fairport Convention reunited every single year from 1980 forward for a performance at the Cropredy Festival. Between 1980 and 1985 the band had a floating line-up, but usually with Simon Nicol, Dave Pegg, and Dave Swarbrick at the core, and—varying from year to year—guest players including former Fairport members Richard Thompson, Dave Mattacks, Bruce Rowland, Trevor Lucas, Jerry Donahue, Judy Dyble, Ashley Hutchings and Dan Ar Braz.	Moat on the Ledge: Live at Broughton Castle, August '81
1985	Dave Pegg – bass guitar, mandolin, backing vocals; Simon Nicol – guitar, vocals; Dave Mattacks – drums, keyboards, bass guitar	Gladys' Leap (1985)
1985–1996	Dave Pegg – bass guitar, mandolin, backing vocals; Simon Nicol – guitar, vocals; Dave Mattacks – drums, keyboards, bass guitar; Maartin Allcock – guitar, mandolin, keyboards, vocals; Ric Sanders – fiddles, keyboards, backing vocals	Expletive Delighted! (1986); In Real Time: Live '87 (1987); Red & Gold (1988); The Five Seasons (1990); Jewel in the Crown (1995); Old New Borrowed Blue (1996) without Mattacks; Kind Fortune (2000) studio tracks
1996–1998	Dave Pegg – bass guitar, mandolin, backing vocals; Simon Nicol – guitar, vocals; Dave Mattacks – drums, keyboards, bass guitar; Ric Sanders – fiddles, keyboards, backing vocals; Chris Leslie – fiddle, mandolin, bouzouki, vocals	Who Knows Where the Time Goes? (1997)
1998–2022	Dave Pegg – bass guitar, mandolin, vocals; Simon Nicol – guitar, lead vocals; Ric Sanders – fiddles, keyboards, backing vocals; Chris Leslie – fiddle, mandolin, bouzouki, vocals; Gerry Conway – drums, percussion	The Wood and the Wire (1999); XXXV (2002); Over the Next Hill (2004); Journeyman's Grace (2005); Acoustically Down Under (2005); Off the Desk (2006); Sense of Occasion (2007); Festival Bell (2011); By Popular Request (2012); Myths and Heroes (2015); 50:50@50 (2017); Shuffle and Go (2020); Off the Desk 2020 (2021)
2022–2023	Dave Pegg – bass guitar, mandolin, backing vocals; Simon Nicol – guitar, lead vocals; Ric Sanders – fiddles, keyboards, backing vocals; Chris Leslie – fiddle, mandolin, bouzouki, vocals	none
2023–present	Dave Pegg – bass guitar, mandolin, backing vocals; Simon Nicol – guitar, lead vocals; Ric Sanders – fiddles, keyboards, backing vocals; Chris Leslie – fiddle, mandolin, bouzouki, vocals; Dave Mattacks – drums, percussion	none to date
