= Fairport Convention discography =

Folk rock group Fairport Convention is usually credited as the first British folk rock band. Founded in 1967 and initially covering songs by artists such as Bob Dylan and Joni Mitchell, they developed a devoted niche following by providing electrified and upbeat versions of traditional folk tunes alongside their own compositions. In a career spanning over 50 years, notable for numerous changes of line-up as well as continued success, Fairport Convention have issued over 50 albums.

== Albums ==
=== Studio albums ===
Release date	Title
June 1968	Fairport Convention
December 1968	What We Did on Our Holidays (titled Fairport Convention in the US)
July 1969	Unhalfbricking
December 1969	Liege & Lief
July 1970	Full House
June 1971	Angel Delight
November 1971	"Babbacombe" Lee
March 1973	Rosie
October 1973	Nine
June 1975	Rising for the Moon
May 1976	Gottle O'Geer – credited to "Fairport featuring Dave Swarbrick" in the US, to "Fairport" in the UK
July 1977	The Bonny Bunch of Roses
May 1978	Tipplers Tales
August 1985	Gladys' Leap
August 1986	Expletive Delighted!
1987	Heyday (BBC Radio Sessions 1968–69)
December 1988	Red & Gold
December 1990	The Five Seasons
January 1995	Jewel in the Crown
May 1996	Old New Borrowed Blue – Studio/Live, credited to "Fairport Acoustic Convention"
June 1997	Who Knows Where the Time Goes?
November 1999	The Wood and the Wire
March 2000	Wishfulness Waltz (New version of the Who Knows Where The Time Goes?, with a new title, new artwork, and 4 bonus tracks taken from The Cropredy Box)
February 2002	XXXV
September 2004	Over the Next Hill
February 2007	Sense of Occasion
January 2011	Festival Bell
January 2012	By Popular Request
January 2015	Myths and Heroes
January 2017	50:50@50 – Studio/Live
January 2020	Shuffle and Go

=== Live albums ===
Date	Title
July 1974	Fairport Live Convention (titled A Moveable Feast in the USA)
January 1977	Live at the L.A. Troubadour (Recorded Sept 1970)
1979	Farewell Farewell (aka Encore Encore)
1982	Moat on the Ledge – Live at Broughton Castle (Recorded 15 August 1981)
June 1986	House Full: Live at the L.A. Troubadour (Recorded Sept 1970)
December 1987	In Real Time: Live '87 (recorded "as live" in the studio)
October 1994	25th Anniversary Concert
1997	Encore, encore
1998	The Cropredy Box (3-CD set)
1999	Cropredy 98
2000	Kind Fortune (2-CD set – the first live, the second a compilation)
2002	From Cropredy to Portmeirion (Recorded 1990)
2002	The Airing Cupboard Tapes (Recorded 1971–1974)
2002	Cropredy 2002 (2-CD set)
2004	The Quiet Joys of Brotherhood (2-CD set + interview DVD, recorded at Cropredy 1986 & 1987)
2004	Cropredy Capers: 25 Years of Fairport Convention and Friends at Cropredy Festival (4-CD set)
2005	Journeyman's Grace
2005	Acoustically Down Under (Recorded 1996)
2006	Off the Desk
2007	Live at the BBC
2007	Who Knows? 1975
2007	On the Ledge (2-CD set, 35th Anniversary Concert)
2008	Live at Cropredy '08
January 2012	Babbacombe Lee Live Again
August 2013	Live at the L.A. Troubadour (live album featuring Sandy Denny; issued on the Rising For the Moon: Deluxe Edition)
2018	What We Did on Our Saturday
2021	Off the Desk 2020
January 2023	Full House For Sale
January 2024	A Live Recording – UK Tour October 2023

=== Compilation albums ===
Release date	Title
1972	The History of Fairport Convention
1975	Tour Sampler (UK Only issue)
July 1976	Fairport Chronicles (USA only; A&M Records SP-3530)
1983	Folk With Poke (Instrumentals And Sloth) (Studio/live; Australia-only compilation)
1991	The Woodworm Years (includes solo material from Dave Pegg, Simon Nicol, Martin Allcock, and Ric Sanders)
1995	A Chronicle of Sorts 1967–1969
1998	Close to the Wind (Various songs taken from Red and Gold, The Five Seasons, and the bonus track on the 1995 re-release of Red & Gold)
1999	Meet on the Ledge: The Classic Years 1967–1975 (2-CD set)
1999	Fiddlestix: The Best of Fairport, 1972–1984
2001	Some of Our Yesterdays
2002	Fairport Convention (2002 compilation)
2002	Then & Now 1982–1996: The Best of Fairport Convention
February 2003	Rhythm of the Times (1985–1990)
2003	Shines Like Gold (3-CD set)
2003	Across the Decades (2-CD set)
2006	The Classic Collection (2-CD set)
January 2009	Fame and Glory
2017	The Essential Fairport Convention: Who Knows Where The Time Goes? (3-CD set)
2017	Come All Ye: The First Ten Years (7-CD set)
2018	A Tree With Roots: Fairport Convention and the Songs of Bob Dylan

== Singles (UK issues) ==
- "If I Had a Ribbon Bow"/"If (Stomp)" – February 1968, (Track)
- "Meet on the Ledge"/"Throwaway Street Puzzle" – December 1968, (Island). Chart: #52 (Note: Chart position is from the official UK "Breakers List".)
- "I'll Keep It with Mine"/"Fotheringay" – 1969, (A&M)
- "Si Tu Dois Partir"/"Genesis Hall" – July 1969, (Island, UK; A&M, US) Chart: #21
- "If (Stomp)"/"Chelsea Morning" – April 1970, (Polydor)
- "Now Be Thankful"/"Sir B. McKenzie's Daughter's Lament..." – September 1970 (Island)
- "Walk Awhile"/"Sir Patrick Spens" – 1970, (Série Parade: France)
- "Sickness & Diseases"/"Wizard of Worldly Game" – 1971
- "John Lee"/"The Time Is Near" – February 1972 (Island)
- "The World Has Surely Lost Its Head"/"The Journeyman's Grace" – February 1972 (A&M, US)
- "Rosie"/"Knights of the Road" – February 1973, (Island)
- "Rosie"/"Fiddlestix" – May 1973 (Island)
- "The Devil in the Kitchen"/"Possibly Parsons Green" – January 1974 (Island: Australia / New Zealand only)
- "White Dress"/"Tears" – 1975, (Island)
- "Si Tu Dois Partir"/"White Dress" – August 1975 (Série Parade: France)
- "Jams O'Donnell's Jig"/"The Last Waltz" – June 1978
- "Rubber Band"/"The Bonny Black Hare" – March 1980, (Simons Records)
- "Quazi-Be-Goode"/"Where Would You Rather Be Tonight?" – August 1986 (Sunrise)
- "Meet on the Ledge"/"Sigh Beg Sigh Mor" – May 1987 (Island)
