= Dave Swarbrick discography =

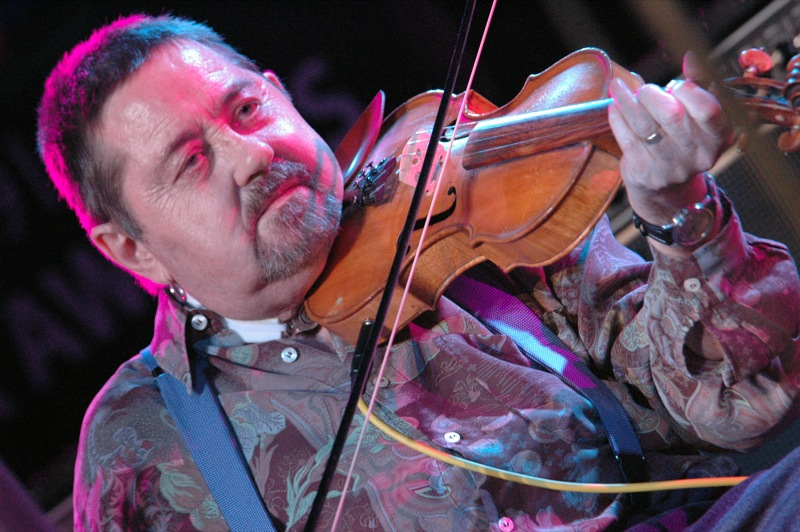
- Swarbrick performing in London, at the BBC Radio 2 Folk Awards, 2006
- Studio albums: 10

The discography of Dave Swarbrick, an English folk musician and singer-songwriter, consists of 11 solo studio albums, and many other albums with other bands and musicians, most notably with British folk rock band Fairport Convention, with whom he was a leading member and violinist for over fifteen years. He also appears as a guest musician on the albums of a large number of other artists.

== Solo albums ==
- Swarbrick (Transatlantic, 1976)
- Swarbrick 2 (Transatlantic, 1977)
- Lift The Lid and Listen (Sonet, 1978)
- The Ceilidh Album (Sonet, 1978)
- Smiddyburn (Logo, 1981)
- Flittin' (Spindrift, 1983)
- When the Battle is Over [compilation from: Swarbrick (1976); Swarbrick 2 (1977); Smiddyburn (1981)] (Conifer, 1986)
- Live at Jackson's Lane (Musikfolk, 1996)
- English Fiddler: Swarbrick plays Swarbrick (Naxos World, 2003)
- It Suits Me Well: The Transatlantic Anthology (Castle, 2004)
- Raison d'être (Shirty, 2010)

== With Fairport Convention ==
- Unhalfbricking (Island, 1969, not a full-fledged member but played on four of the eight tracks)
- Liege & Lief (Island, 1969)
- Full House (Island, 1970)
- Angel Delight (Island, 1971)
- "Babbacombe" Lee (Island, 1971)
- Rosie (Island, 1973)
- Nine (A&M, 1973)
- Rising for the Moon (Island, 1975)
- Gottle O'Geer (Island, 1976, credited to "Fairport featuring Dave Swarbrick" in the US, to "Fairport" in the UK)
- The Bonny Bunch of Roses (Vertigo, 1977)
- Tipplers Tales (Vertigo, 1978)

== With the Ian Campbell Folk Group ==
- Ceilidh at the Crown (EP) (Topic, 1962)
- Songs of Protest (EP) (Topic, 1962)
- "The Sun Is Burning" / "The Crow and the Cradle" (single) (Topic, 1963)
- This Is The Ian Campbell Folk Group (Transatlantic, 1963)
- Across the Hills (Transatlantic, 1964)
- The Ian Campbell Folk Group (EP) (Decca, 1964)
- Presenting the Ian Campbell Folk Group (Contour, 1964, same track list as This Is The Ian Campbell Folk Group)
- Coaldust Ballads (Transatlantic, 1965)
- A Sample of The Ian Campbell Folk Group (EP) (Transatlantic, 1966)
- Contemporary Campbells (Transatlantic, 1966)
- Four Highland Songs (EP) (Transatlantic, 1966)
- This Is The Ian Campbell Folk Group / Across the Hills (Castle Music, 1996)
- Contemporary Campbells / New Impressions (Castle Music, 1997)
- The Times They Are A-Changin (Castle Music, 2005)

== On Ewan MacColl, A. L. Lloyd and Peggy Seeger albums ==
- Whaler Out of New Bedford (Folkways, 1962)
- The Big Hewer (The Radio Ballads Vol 4) (Argo, 1967)
- The Fight Game (The Radio Ballads Vol 7) (Argo, 1967)
- The Travelling People (The Radio Ballads Vol 8) (Argo, 1968)

== On Ewan MacColl and A. L. Lloyd albums ==
- A Sailor's Garland (Prestige, 1962)

== With various artists ==
- Edinburgh Folk Festival Vol. 1 (Decca, 1963)
- Edinburgh Folk Festival Vol. 2 (Decca, 1964)
- Farewell Nancy: Sea Songs and Shanties (Topic, 1964)
- The Bird in the Bush: Traditional Erotic Songs (Topic, 1966)
- The Best of British Folk Music (Transatlantic, 1966)
- Nice Enough to Eat (Island, 1969)
- El Pea (Island, 1971)
- Clogs (Peg Records, 1972)
- Club Folk Volume 1 (Peg Records, 1972)
- Club Folk Volume 2 (Peg Records, 1972)
- Rave On (B&C/Mooncrest, 1974)
- The Camera and the Song (Super Beeb, 1975)
- The Electric Muse (Island/Transatlantic, 1975)
- Rosin the Bow: An Introduction to the World of Fiddle Music (Transatlantic, 1977)
- The Best of Irish Folk (1978)
- Transatlantic – The Vintage Years (Transatlantic, 1978)
- 40 Folk Favourites (Pickwick, 1979)
- Chants de Marins IV: Ballades, Complaintes et Shanties des Matelots Anglais (Le Chasse-Marée, 1984)
- Flash Company – A Celebration of the First 10 Years of Fellside Recordings (Fellside, 1986)
- Island Life: 25 Years of Island Record (Island, 1988)
- Blow the Man Down: A Collection of Sea Songs and Shanties (Topic, 1993).
- Club Sandwich (cassette) (Musikfolk, 1993)
- Tanz- & Folkfest Rudolstadt 1992 (HeiDeck, 1993)
- The World Is a Wonderful Place (Hokey Pokey, 1993)
- Undefeated (cassette) (Fuse, 1993)
- Folk Routes (Island, 1994)
- Troubadours of British Folk, Vol. 1: Unearthing the Tradition, (Rhino, 1995)
- Troubadours of British Folk, Vol. 2: Folk into Rock (Rhino, 1995)
- Various Artists, The Bird in the Bush: Traditional Songs of Love and Lust (Topic, 1996)
- Georgia on Our Mind (Deep Sea, 1997)
- New Electric Muse II (Castle Music, 1997)
- Bold Sportsmen All (Topic, 1998)
- The Rough Guide to English Roots Music (World Music Network, 1998)
- Various Artists, English Originals (Topic, 1999)
- The Fiddle Collection Volume One (Hands On Music, 1999)
- The Folk Collection (Topic, 1999)
- Heart of England: In Aid of Teenage Cancer Trust (Teenage Cancer Trust, 2001)
- Flash Company – A Celebration of 25 Years of Fellside Recordings (Fellside, 2001)
- Raise Your Banners: Festival of Political Song (Raise Your Banners Festival, 2001)
- The Acoustic Folk Box (Topic, 2002)
- Red Roots (Red Planet, 2002)
- Heart of England 2: In Aid of Teenage Cancer Trust (Teenage Cancer Trust, 2002)
- Strangely Strange But Oddly Normal: An Island Anthology 1967–1972 (Universal/Island, 2005)
- Anthems in Eden: An Anthology of British & Irish Folk 1955–1978 (Castle, 2006)
- The Fairport Companion: Loose Chippings from the Fairport Family Tree (Castle Music, 2006)
- Garden of Delight (Discothèque, 2006)
- Scarborough Fair (Castle Music, 2006)
- Various Artists, White Bicycles: Making Music in the 1960s (Fledg'ling, 2006)
- Folk Awards 2007 (Proper Folk, 2006)

== On Martin Carthy albums ==
- Martin Carthy (Fontana, 1965)
- Martin Carthy, This is ... Martin Carthy: The Bonny Black Hare and Other Songs (Philips, 1971)
- Martin Carthy, The Carthy Chronicles (Free Reed, 2001)

== With Martin Carthy ==
- Second Album (Fontana, 1966)
- Byker Hill (Fontana, 1967)
- No Songs (EP) (Fontana, 1967)
- But Two Came By (Fontana, 1968)
- Prince Heathen (Fontana, 1969)
- Selections (Pegasus, 1971)
- Life And Limb (Special Delivery, 1990)
- Skin And Bone (Special Delivery, 1992)
- Both Ears and the Tail: Live at the Folkus Folk Club, Nottingham, 1966 (Atrax, 2000)
- Straws In The Wind (Topic, 2006)

== On Julie Felix albums ==
- Changes (Fontana, 1966)

== On A. L. Lloyd albums ==
- First Person (Topic, 1966)
- Leviathan! Ballads and Songs of the Whaling Trade (Topic, 1967)
- The Great Australian Legend: A Panorama of Bush Balladry and Song (Topic, 1971)
- Classic A. L. Lloyd (Fellside, 1994)
- A.L. Lloyd, The Old Bush Songs (Larrikin, 1994)

== With Martin Carthy and Diz Disley ==
- Rags, Reels & Airs (Polydor, 1967)

== On Nigel Denver albums ==
- Rebellion! (Decca, 1967)

== On Vashti Bunyan albums ==
- Just Another Diamond Day (Philips, 1970)

== On John Renbourn albums ==
- The Lady and the Unicorn (Transatlantic, 1970)

== On Sandy Denny albums ==
- Sandy (Island, 1972)
- Who Knows Where the Time Goes? (Island, 1986)
- The Best of Sandy Denny (Island, 1987)
- No More Sad Refrains: The Anthology (Island, 2000)
- A Boxful of Treasures (Fledg'ling, 2004)
- The Notes and the Words: A Collection of Demos and Rarities (Island, 2012)
- Rendezvous (Island, 2012)

== On Al Stewart albums ==
- Past, Present & Future (CBS, 1973)

== On Brian Maxine albums ==
- Ribbon of Stainless Steel (Columbia, 1974)

== On Lorna Campbell albums ==
- Adam's Rib (Transatlantic, 1976)

== On Richard Thompson albums ==
- (guitar, vocal) (Island, 1976)
- Watching the Dark – The History of Richard Thompson (Hannibal, 1993)
- RT: The Life and Music of Richard Thompson (Free Reed, 2006)

== On Peter Bellamy albums ==
- The Transports (Free Reed, 1977)
- Both Sides Then (Topic, 1979)

== On Bat McGrath albums ==
- Whatever Happened to Jousting? (Manana, 1980)

== With Simon Nicol ==
- Live at the White Bear (White Bear, 1981)
- In the Club (cassette)(1982)
- Close to the Wind (Woodworm, 1984)
- Close to the White Bear (Woodworm, 1998) [compilation from Live at the White Bear and Close to the Wind]
- Another Fine Mess: Live in New York '84 (Atrax, 2002)
- When We Were Very Young (Talking Elephant, 2010)

== With Whippersnapper ==
- Promises (WPS, 1985)
- Tsubo (WPS, 1987)
- These Foolish Strings (WPS, 1988)
- Fortune (WPS, 1989)

== On Voice of the Beehive albums ==
- Let It Bee (London, 1988)

== On Leon Rosselson albums ==
- Wo sind die Elefanten? (Fuse Records, 1992)

== On The Band of Hope albums ==
- Rhythm & Reds (Musikfolk, 1994)

== On Pete Hawkes albums ==
- Secrets, Vows & Lies (Select Records, 1996)
- Unspoken Riddles (Select Records, 1996)

== With Alistair Hulett ==
- Saturday Johnny and Jimmy The Rat (Red Rattler, 1996)
- The Cold Grey Light of Dawn (Musikfolk, 1998)
- Red Clydeside (Red Rattler, 2002)

== On Keith Hancock albums ==
- Born Blue (Nico's Records, 1997)
- The Keith Hancock Band Live (Epona Records, 2015)

== Collaboration with Eureka! ==
- Jammin' with Gypsy (Word of Mouth, 1998)

== Compilations including other artists ==
- Folk on 2: Dave Swarbrick's 50th Birthday Concert (Cooking Vinyl, 1996)
- Dave Pegg and Friends, Birthday Party (Woodworm, 1998)
- Swarb! Forty Five Years of Folk's Finest Fiddler: The Life and Music of Dave Swarbrick (compilation box set) (Free Reed, 2003)
- Dave Pegg: 60th Birthday Bash (Matty Groves, 2007)

== Collaboration with Dave Swarbrick and Fairport Convention ==
- SwarbAid (Woodworm Records, 1999)
- Scrum-Half Bricking - Fairport With Swarb at Derby (Front Row Records, 2003)

== On Steve Ashley albums ==
- Stroll On – Revisited (Market Square, 1999)

== On Roy Bailey albums ==
- Coda (Fuse, 2000)

== On John Kirkpatrick albums ==
- Mazurka Berserker (Fledg'ling, 2001)

== On Bert Jansch albums ==
- Edge of a Dream (Sanctuary, 2002)

== With Swarb's Lazarus ==
- Live and Kicking (Squiggle, 2006)

== With The Jason Wilson Band ==
- The Peacemaker's Chauffeur (Wheel, 2008)
- Lion Rampant (Wheel/Proper, 2014)

== With The Geoff Everett Band ==
- The Quick and the Dead (Not On Label, 2012)

== With Red Shoes ==
- All The Good Friends (Cedarwood Records, 2012)

== With Said the Maiden ==
- A Curious Tale (Maiden Records, 2014)

== With Duncan Wood and guests ==
- Swarbtricks (Beechwood Records, 2013)
