= English folk music (1980–1989) =

== Births and deaths ==
=== Deaths ===
- A.L. Lloyd (1908–1982)
- Ewan MacColl (1915–1989)
- John Lennon (1940–1980)

== Recordings ==
- 1980: Oyster Band (Oyster Band)
- 1980: Sails of Silver (Steeleye Span)
- 1981: Smiddyburn (Dave Swarbrick)
- 1982: Moat On The Ledge - Live At Broughton Castle (Fairport Convention)
- 1982: Shoot Out The Lights (Richard Thompson)
- 1983: Abyssinians (June Tabor)
- 1984: Close to the Wind (Dave Swarbrick)
- 1985: Gladys' Leap (Fairport Convention)
- 1986: Wall of Sound (Blowzabella)
- 1986: Back in Line (Steeleye Span)
- 1986: Expletive Delighted (Fairport Convention)
- 1986: House Full (Fairport Convention)
- 1987: In Real Time (Fairport Convention)
- 1987: Heyday (Fairport Convention)
- 1987: Borderlands (Kathryn Tickell)
- 1988: A Richer Dust (Blowzabella)
- 1989: Red and Gold (Fairport Convention)
- 1989: Tempted and Tried (Steeleye Span)
- 1989: 25 Years On The Road (Harvey Andrews)

== See also ==
- Music of the United Kingdom (1980s)
