= Bruce Rowland =

Bruce Rowland may refer to:

- Bruce Rowland (composer)
- Bruce Rowland (drummer)
