= Live at the L.A. Troubadour =

Live album by Fairport Convention
- Released: January 1977
- Recorded: 4–6 September 1970
- Genre: Folk rock
- Label: Island
- Producer: Joe Boyd

Fairport Convention chronology
Gottle O'Geer (1976)	Live at the L.A. Troubadour (1977)	The Bonny Bunch of Roses (1977)

Professional ratings
Review scores
Source	Rating
Allmusic	3/5 stars

Live at the L.A. Troubadour along with its reissued counterpart House Full are the only live Fairport Convention albums recorded while Richard Thompson was a full-time band member. It was recorded in 1970 on the Full House tour and was reissued in 1986 and again in 2007, with modifications. Seven of the eight tracks are available on the House Full album with one ("Poor Will and the Jolly Hangman") being found only on this album.

== Track listing ==
Side 1

1. "Toss the Feathers" (traditional; arranged by Fairport Convention) 3'49" (The Lark in the Morning Medley)
2. "Matty Groves" (traditional; arranged by Fairport Convention) 8'42"
3. "Bonnie Kate" (traditional; arranged by Fairport Convention and Dave Swarbrick) 4'52" (as a medley with "Sir B. McKenzies")
4. "Poor Will and the Jolly Hangman" (Richard Thompson, Dave Swarbrick) 5'23"

Side 2

1. "Sloth" (Richard Thompson, Dave Swarbrick) 11'43"
2. "Banks of the Sweet Primroses" (traditional; arranged by Fairport Convention) 3'58"
3. "Mason's Apron" (traditional; arranged by Fairport Convention) 6'14" (a medley of "Jenny's Chickens / Mason's Apron" )
4. "Yellow Bird" (Marilyn Keith, Alan Bergman, Norman Luboff) 2'11"

== Personnel ==
- Richard Thompson - vocals, electric guitar
- Dave Swarbrick - vocals, fiddle, mandolin
- Simon Nicol - rhythm guitar, mandolin
- Dave Pegg - bass guitar, mandolin, backing vocals
- Dave Mattacks - drums

with

- Linda Thompson - vocals (side 1 track 4 only)

== Recording ==
- All except Track 4 recorded 4–6 September 1970 at the L.A. Troubadour, Los Angeles.
- Track 4 is an outtake from the "Full House" sessions with new vocals by Richard & Linda Thompson overdubbed in March 1975.

== Release history ==
- UK: Island Records HELP 28 (January 1977)
- Australia: Island Records L36090 (1977)
- Germany: Island Records 28208 (1977)
- Netherlands: Island Records 28208 XAT (1977)
- New Zealand: Island Records L36090 (1977)
- Ireland: Island Records HELP 28 (1977)
