= Smiddyburn =

Studio album by Dave Swarbrick
- Released: July 1981
- Recorded: Regal Sound Recorders, Hitchin, 1981
- Genre: Folk rock
- Label: Logo
- Producer: John Wood

Smiddyburn is a 1981 folk album recorded by Dave Swarbrick and named after the farm in Aberdeenshire where Swarbrick lived at the time. The tracks are mostly renditions of traditional folk tunes, and Swarbrick is assisted by his erstwhile colleagues from Fairport Convention as well as his early mentor, Beryl Marriott.

== Track listing ==
- All tracks credited to "Trad. arr. Dave Swarbrick" unless otherwise noted

=== Side one ===
1. "Wat Ye Wha I Met the Streen"/"The Ribbons of the Redheaded Girl"/"Ril Gan Ainm" (4:48)
2. "Sir Charles Coote"/"Smiths" (2:43)
3. "I Have a Wife of My Own"/"Lady Mary Haye's Scotch Measure" (3:37)
4. "Wishing"/"The Victor's Return"/"The Gravel Walk" (5:15)

=== Side two ===
1. "When The Battle is Over" (3:37)
2. "Sword Dance"/"The Young Black Crow" (4:18)
3. "Sean O'Dwyer of the Glen"/"The Hag With The Money"/"Sleepy Maggie" (4:52)
4. "It Suits Me Well" - (Sandy Denny) (5:48)

== Personnel ==
Tracks 1, 4, 6 and 8 are with Fairport Convention and Richard Thompson

- Dave Swarbrick - violin, mandolin, vocals
- Simon Nicol - guitar
- Dave Pegg - bass, mandolin
- Dave Mattacks - drums, percussion
- Richard Thompson - guitar, mandolin, mandocello
- Beryl Marriott - piano, piano accordion, clavichord
- John McCormack - double bass
- Bruce Rowland - drums
- Roger Marriott - harmonica
