= Jason Wilson (musician) =

Canadian historian and musician (born 1970)

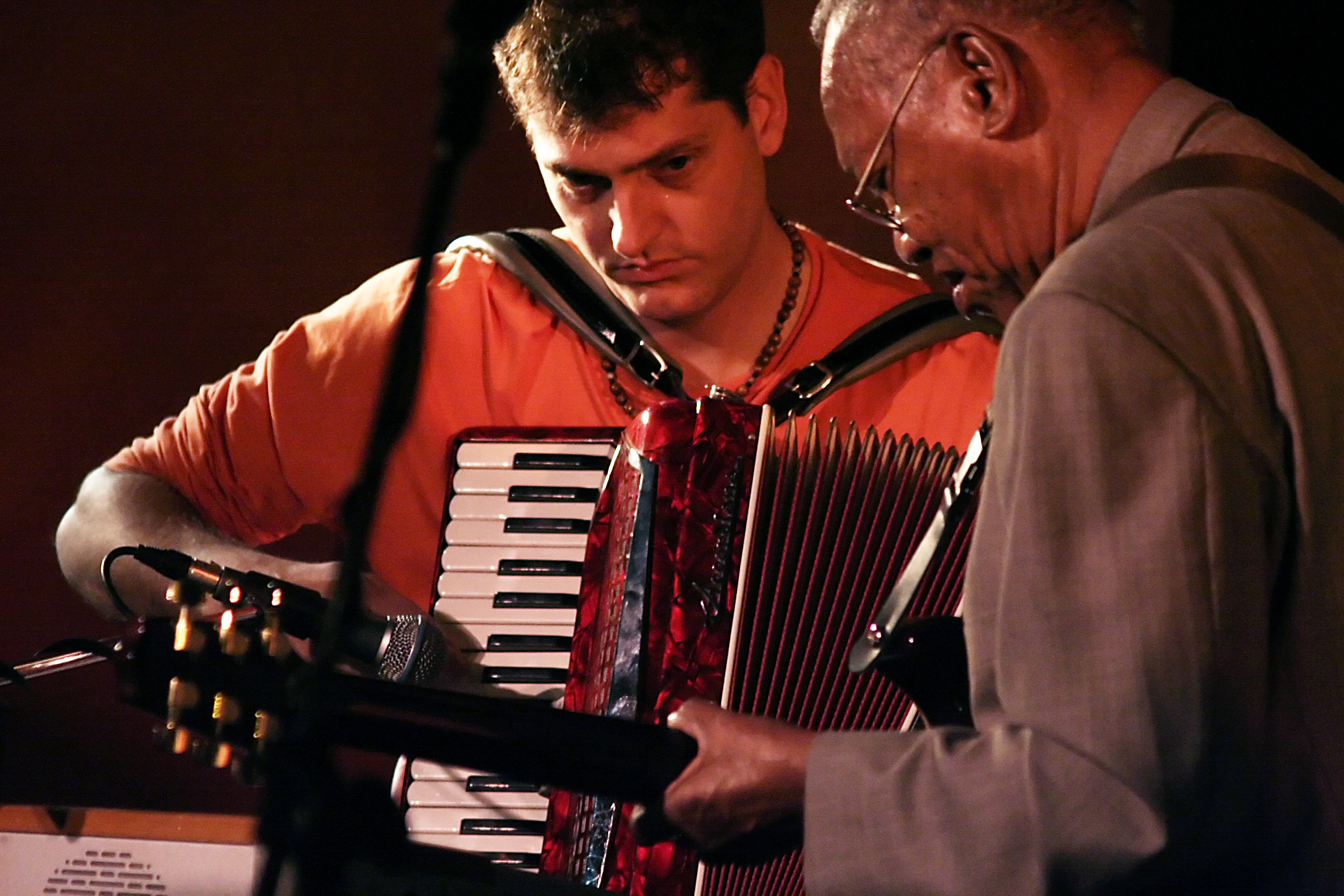
- Wilson performing with Ernest Ranglin in 2005

Background information
- Born: John Jason Collins Wilson; May 31, 1970 (age 55)
- Origin: North York, Ontario, Canada
- Genres: Reggae, jazz, folk
- Occupations: musician, author, historian
- Instruments: Piano, vocals, guitar, accordion
- Years active: 1989–present
- Label: Wheel Records
- Website: www.jasonwilsonmusic.com

Jason Wilson (born May 31, 1970) is a Canadian historian and reggae musician from North York, Ontario, Canada. He is the protégé of Studio One keyboardist Jackie Mittoo and the cousin of UB40's Michael Virtue. Though they never met, Scottish-born American songwriter Johnny Cymbal is Wilson's first cousin, once removed. Known for incorporating jazz and Scottish influences atop a reggae foundation, Wilson is a multi-instrumentalist, though is perhaps best known for his piano skills. The singer-songwriter has also performed and recorded with UB40, Sly & Robbie, Alanis Morissette, Ernest Ranglin, Pee Wee Ellis, Dave Swarbrick, Ron Sexsmith, The Mighty Sparrow, Percy Sledge, Brinsley Forde (Aswad), Dick Gaughan, David Francey, Brownman Ali.

== Biography ==
Wilson was born in North York, Ontario, Canada to Scottish immigrants and performed his first night club show when he was only 14 years old with Canadian reggae pioneers Messenjah. He later led the band Tabarruk, whose debut self-titled album included a duet with Wilson and Alanis Morissette. With Tabarruk, Wilson performed over 2,000 shows around the world, more than any other Canadian reggae act. Amanda Marshall was once a member of the band. Following their debut, the act's name was changed to Jason Wilson & Tabarruk who released Dark Corners in 1998 (which included the song "Icarus' Lament"), followed by the Juno-nominated Jonah (2000) and then the critically acclaimed Dread & Blue (2004) which spawned Wilson's anthem "Keele Street" which has been featured several times on Canadian radio, film and television, including on the Canadian television production Da Kink in My Hair. Following this album, Wilson embarked on a solo career releasing the Juno-nominated and Canadian Reggae Music Award-winning The Peacemaker's Chauffeur in 2008. The album incorporates Wilson's historical take on elements of war and peace.

Wilson was awarded the Karl Mullings Memorial Award for commitment to reggae in Canada in 2007. Wilson's life story and music have been featured many times on radio and television, including a mini-doc entitled The Grateful Dread on CBC's The National with Peter Mansbridge as well as a feature documentary on BBC Radio. Wilson is also one half of the successful Marley/Dylan tribute act The Two Bobs, alongside Fergus Hambleton, the lead singer of the two-time Juno-Award-winning reggae act The Sattalites. Wilson is also one-half of the reggae-folk combo Wilson & Swarbrick and is the leader of Soldiers of Song, a tribute to The Dumbells, Canada's famous concert party of World War I. Soldiers of Song was also featured on The National in 2013.

An award-winning author, Wilson co-wrote Lord Stanley: The Man Behind the Cup with Kevin Shea in 2006 that won the New York-based Heritage Award for Outstanding Sports Research and Writing. Winner of a SSHRC scholarship, Wilson received his PhD in Canadian History at the University of Guelph in 2013. Wilson has also been published several times on a wide variety of historical topics (see Books and articles). In 2009, Wilson was nominated by the Guelph Mercury for their "Top 40 Under 40" for his achievements in music and in academics. In the summer of 2009, Wilson served as the lone professional musician on the advisory committee alongside Senator Pamela Wallin and others for the "Cantos at the King Eddy" project in Calgary that will soon serve as the nation's music museum.

In 2014, Wilson released a full-length album with English fiddler and former Fairport Convention member Dave Swarbrick entitled The Lion Rampant. The critically acclaimed album included special guests Martin Carthy, Peggy Seeger, Pee Wee Ellis and John Kirkpatrick. British folk music critic Ken Hunt called the album: "Head and shoulders, the most eclectic, catholic and coherent musical banquet of 2014 thus far."

In 2016, Jason Wilson and the Perennials released the first album of trilogy entitled Perennials. Wilson wrote the album in New York City while his wife was working at the UN. The sextet, which includes trumpet, sax, bass, guitar, cajon and Wilson on piano and vocals, is playing several dates across Canada in support of the release.

== Style ==
The improvisation element to Wilson's style is not typical in reggae, but rather borrows heavily from the jazz tradition. Wilson has covered the music of many divergent artists both live and in the studio, a fact that speaks to the broad spectrum of his tastes. These artists include Kate Bush, Thelonious Monk, Wayne Shorter, Sergei Rachmaninoff, Oscar Peterson and Elton John. The music of his Scottish heritage also has, at times, been incorporated into Wilson's music. Still, reggae is the key ingredient in Wilson's art and the keyboard stylings of his mentor Jackie Mittoo can be heard throughout Wilson's work. The British school of reggae has had perhaps the most profound influence on Wilson's writing. In particular, Wilson has admittedly studied the sound of the bands Aswad, Steel Pulse, Matumbi and UB40. Wilson's cousin Michael Virtue was the keyboardist for UB40 for twenty-eight years and appears on Wilson's Jonah album.

== Discography ==
- Jason Wilson, Perennials (Wheel Records, 2016)
- Wilson and Swarbrick, Lion Rampant (Shirty/Wheel Records, 2013)
- Jason Wilson, The Peacemaker's Chauffeur (WR007B, 2008) Juno-Award Nominee/Canadian Reggae Music Award Winner
- Jason Wilson & Tabarruk, Dread & Blue: A Canadiana Suite (WR006B, 2004)
- Jason Wilson & Tabarruk, Jonah (WR005B, 2000) Juno-Award Nominee
- Jason Wilson & Tabarruk, Dark Corners (WR003A, 1998)
- Tabarruk, Tabarruk (WD001, 1994)

== Books and articles ==
- Jason Wilson, Soldiers of Song: The Dumbells and Other Canadian Concert Parties of the First World War. Waterloo: Wilfrid Laurier University Press, 2012.
- J.J. Wilson and K. Shea, Lord Stanley: The Man Behind the Cup. Toronto: Fenn Publishing, 2006.
- J. Jason Wilson, Squirrel Gangs, Streetlights & Bucket Trucks: The History of Waterloo North Hydro. Waterloo: Waterloo North Hydro, 2005.
- J. Jason Wilson, "Skating to Armageddon: Of Canada, Hockey and the First World War", The International Journal of the History of Sport, 22, 3. Oxford: Routledge, May 2005.
- J. Jason Wilson, "27 Remarkable Days: The 1972 Summit Series of Ice Hockey between Canada and the Soviet Union", Totalitarian Movements and Political Religions, 5, 2. Oxford: Taylor & Francis Ltd., September 2004.
