= Farewell, Farewell =

Live album by Fairport Convention
- Released: September 1979
- Recorded: live during Fairport's Farewell Tour in Spring 1979.
- Genre: British folk rock
- Label: Woodworm

Fairport Convention chronology
Tipplers Tales (1978)	Farewell, Farewell (1979)	Moat on the Ledge (1982)

Professional ratings
Review scores
Source	Rating
Allmusic	3/5 stars

Farewell, Farewell is a live Fairport Convention album recorded on the band's farewell tour in 1979. It is the last Fairport album to feature fiddler/mandolinist Dave Swarbrick. Tracks are drawn from three performances of the Farewell Tour during Spring 1979: at Birmingham University, Southampton University and at Derby Assembly Rooms. Most of the songs are performances of already familiar tracks from previous studio albums. In 1997 to mark the 30th anniversary of Fairport Convention, the album was remastered, repackaged and re-released as "Encore Encore". This version included the 1980 studio single "Rubber Band" plus three additional tracks recorded on the 1979 tour: "The Hens March Through the Midden/Four Poster Bed", "Flatback Caper" and "Dirty Linen".

== Track listing ==
Side one

1. "Matty Groves/High Road to Linton/Orange Blossom Special" (Traditional, arrangement by Fairport Convention Ervin T. Rouse) – 8:34
2. "John Lee" (Dave Swarbrick) – 3:18
3. "Bridge Over the River Ash" (Traditional, arrangement by Fairport Convention) – 2:40
4. "Sir Patrick Spens" (Traditional, arrangement by Fairport Convention) – 3:17

Side two

1. "Mr. Lacey" (Ashley Hutchings) – 3:36
2. "Walk Awhile" (Swarbrick, Richard Thompson) – 4:13
3. "The Bonny Black Hare" (Traditional, arrangement by Fairport Convention) – 2:40
4. "The Journeyman's Grace" (Swarbrick, Thompson) – 4:35
5. "Meet on the Ledge" (Thompson) – 6:18

Extra tracks on the 1997 30th Anniversary Edition (Encore Encore) and on the 40th Anniversary Edition.

1. "Rubber Band" - 3:05
2. "The Hens March Through the Midden/Four Poster Bed" - 3:37
3. "Flatback Caper" - 6:38
4. "Dirty Linen" - 4:20

== Personnel ==
- Simon Nicol – vocals, guitar, viola
- Dave Swarbrick – vocals, violin, mandolin
- Dave Pegg – vocals, bass guitar, violin, mandolin
- Bruce Rowland – drums, percussion, bass guitar

== Release history ==
- UK, LP, Woodworm Records BEAR 22 (September 1979)
- UK, LP, Simons Records GAMA 1 (April 1980)
- UK, CD, Road Goes On Forever RFG CD001 (August 1991)
- UK, 2 LP, Turning Point Music TPM-02211 (October 2002)
