= House Full: Live at the L.A. Troubadour =

Live album by Fairport Convention
- Released: June 1986
- Recorded: 4–6 September 1970
- Genre: Folk rock
- Length: 46:29 (original); 53:42 (2001 reissue)
- Label: Hannibal Records
- Producer: Joe Boyd, Frank Kornelussen

Fairport Convention chronology
Moat on the Ledge (1982)	House Full: Live at the L.A. Troubadour (1986)	25th Anniversary Concert (1994)

Professional ratings
Review scores
Source	Rating
Allmusic	4/5 stars
Q	3/5 stars

House Full: Live at the L.A. Troubadour not to be confused with its earlier counterpart Live at the L.A. Troubadour is the only currently available live Fairport Convention album to feature Richard Thompson as a band member.

== Track listing ==
Side 1

1. "Sir Patrick Spens" (trad. arr. Fairport Convention) 3'06"
2. "Banks of the Sweet Primroses" (trad. arr. Fairport Convention) 4'28"
3. "The Lark in the Morning Medley" (trad. arr. Fairport Convention) 3'46"
4. "Sloth" (Richard Thompson / Dave Swarbrick) 11'56"

Side 2

1. "Staines Morris" (trad. arr. Fairport Convention) 3'42"
2. "Matty Groves" (trad. arr. Fairport Convention) 8'42"
3. "Jenny's Chickens / The Mason's Apron" (trad. arr. Fairport Convention) 4'36"
4. "Battle of the Somme" (Pipe Major Robertson) 5'02"

Notes
-

This LP contains some tracks recorded at the same time as those issued on " Live at the L.A. Troubadour" and some that were actually released on that LP.

- Track 2 is re-edited and remixed and is longer than the original version
- Tracks 3 is re-mastered and listed wrongly as " Toss the Feathers"
- Track 4 is a different take from that released on the earlier LP
- Track 6 is re-mastered
- Track 7 is re-edited and remixed and is shorter than the original version and is just listed as " Mason's Apron"

=== 2001 reissue ===
1. "Sir Patrick Spens" (trad. arr. Fairport Convention) 3'28"
2. "Banks of the Sweet Primroses" (trad. arr. Fairport Convention) 4'37"
3. "The Lark in the Morning Medley" (trad. arr. Fairport Convention) 3'53"
4. "Sloth" (Richard Thompson / Dave Swarbrick) 12'18"
5. "Staines Morris" (trad. arr. Fairport Convention) 3'44"
6. "Matty Groves" (trad. arr. Fairport Convention) 8'43"
7. "Jenny's Chickens / The Mason's Apron" (trad. arr. Fairport Convention) 4'41"
8. "Battle of the Somme" (Pipe Major Robertson) 5'01"
9. "Bonnie Kate / Sir B. McKenzies" (trad. arr. Fairport Convention / Dave Swarbrick) 4'56"
10. "Yellow Bird" (Marilyn Keith / Alan Bergman / Norman Luboff) 2'17"
- Tracks, 1–8 are from " House Full" (Hannibal Records HNBL 1319)
- Tracks 9–10 are from " Live at the L.A. Troubadour" (Island Records HELP 28)

== Personnel ==
- Richard Thompson - electric guitar, vocals
- Dave Swarbrick - vocals, fiddle, viola
- Simon Nicol - rhythm guitar, vocals, mandolin (5), electric dulcimer (8)
- Dave Pegg - bass guitar, vocals
- Dave Mattacks - drums, percussion

== Recording ==
- All tracks recorded 4–6 September 1970 at the L.A. Troubadour, Los Angeles.

== Release history ==
- UK (LP) Hannibal Records HNBL 1319 (June 1986)
- UK (CD) Hannibal Records HNCD 1319 (March 1990)
- UK (CD) Island Records IMCD 289/586376-2 (8 October 2001) Remastered reissue with bonus tracks
- USA (CD) Hannibal Records HNCD 1319 (July 1990)
- AUSTRALIA (CD) Hannibal Records D41251 (1992) (imported CD with sticker on back containing Australian catalogue number
- JAPAN (CD) MIDI MDC6-1110 (August 1990)
