= Expletive Delighted! =

Studio album by Fairport Convention
- Released: August 1986
- Recorded: February, April and May 1986
- Studio: Woodworm Studios, Barford St. Michael, Oxfordshire; 51.9918°N 1.3661°W
- Genre: British folk rock
- Length: 35:53
- Label: Woodworm
- Producer: Fairport Convention

Fairport Convention chronology
Gladys' Leap (1985)	Expletive Delighted! (1986)	In Real Time: Live '87 (1987)

Expletive Delighted! is a 1986 album by British folk rock band Fairport Convention, their fifteenth studio album since their debut in 1968. It is the band's only album consisting solely of instrumental tracks, despite the claim "Lyric sheet enclosed" on the album cover.

Ric Sanders, who had played on some tracks on the previous album Gladys' Leap, was invited to join Fairport full-time, as was Maartin Allcock; the result, according to Dave Pegg,

"Ric and Maart were both writing stuff, composing these great instrumental pieces. I thought we should do something immediately, catch the moment. So we put out an all instrumental album, Expletive Delighted. I really wanted to show everyone just what these new chaps could do, how brilliantly they could play. ... The line-up meant we could tour again, it meant we had new material for Cropredy, it meant there was a Fairport again. So from 1986 on, Cropredy wasn't just a reunion festival any more. We had a band."

This new lineup would last for the next eleven years, the most stable of all of Fairport's configurations to that point.

== Reception ==
Allmusic's reviewer described Expletive Delighted! as "alternately enjoyable and maddening", criticising the prominence of Dave Mattacks's drums in the mix, while praising "Portmeirion" and the title track as "delicate and beautiful as any work that this version of the band has done".

== Track listing ==
Side one

1. "The Rutland Reel/Sack the Juggler" (Ric Sanders) - 3:20
2. "The Cat on the Mixer/Three Left Feet" (Maartin Allcock) - 3:37
3. "Bankruptured" (Dave Pegg) - 3:04
4. "Portmeirion" (Ric Sanders) - 5:21
5. "Jams O'Donnell's Jigs" (Dave Pegg) - 2:48

Side two

1. "Expletive Delighted" (Ric Sanders) - 1:55
2. "Sigh Beg Sigh Mor" (O' Carolan) - 7:18
3. "Innstuck" (Maartin Allcock) - 2:08
4. "The Gas Almost Works" (John Kirkpatrick) 1:58
5. "Hanks for the Memory" (various, arrangement by Jerry Donahue) - 4:38
  1. "Shazam!" (Duane Eddy, Lee Hazlewood)
  2. "Pipeline" (Bob Spickard, Brian Carmen)
  3. "Apache" (Jerry Lordan)
  4. "Peter Gunn" (Henry Mancini)

== Release history ==
- 1986, August : Woodworm Records WR009, UK LP; WRC004 UK Cassette
- 1986 : Varrick Records VR029, US LP
- 1986, December : Sandstock SSM019, Australia LP
- 1987, August : Entente 12-3074 (833 074-928), Germany, LP (different cover, gatefold sleeve)
- 1990 :Varrick CD-VR-029, US CD
- 1990 : Folkprint FP002CD, UK CD, reissue with Gladys' Leap

== Personnel ==
Fairport Convention

- Maartin Allcock - guitars, bouzouki, mandolin
- Dave Mattacks - drums, percussion, keyboards
- Simon Nicol - guitars
- Dave Pegg - acoustic & bass guitars, mandola
- Ric Sanders - violin

Additional musicians on "Hanks for the Memory"

- Jerry Donahue - guitar
- Richard Thompson - guitar

Technical

- Tim Matyear - engineer
