= The Bonny Bunch of Roses (album) =

Studio album by Fairport Convention
- Released: July 1977
- Recorded: August 1976–March 1977
- Studio: Island (London)
- Genre: Folk rock
- Label: Vertigo
- Producer: Fairport Convention

Fairport Convention chronology
Live at the L.A. Troubadour (1977)	The Bonny Bunch of Roses (1977)	Tipplers Tales (1978)

Professional ratings
Review scores
Source	Rating
AllMusic	2/5 stars
MusicHound Rock: The Essential Album Guide	2/5 stars

The Bonny Bunch of Roses is a studio album by the English band Fairport Convention, released in 1977.

The album had the highest number of traditional songs that Fairport had recorded since Liege & Lief. For this album, Simon Nicol returned after an absence of five years although he had contributed some guitar to the previous record, Gottle O'Geer and mixed the album. It was recorded between August 1976 and March 1977 at Island Studios, London.

== Track listing ==
All tracks credited to "Trad." unless otherwise noted

Side one

1. "Jams O'Donnells Jig" (Dave Pegg) - 2:33
2. "The Eynsham Poacher" - 2:22
3. "Adieu Adieu" - 2:26
4. "The Bonny Bunch of Roses" - 12:19

Side two

1. "The Poor Ditching Boy" (Richard Thompson) - 3:56
2. "General Taylor" - 3:39
3. "Run Johnny Run" (Ralph McTell) - 4:34
4. "The Last Waltz" (Dave Swarbrick) - 3:02
5. "Royal Seleccion No 13" (Haste to the Wedding/Morpeth Rant/Toytown March/Dashing White Sargeant) - 4:15

== Personnel ==
- Dave Swarbrick – fiddle, vocals, mandolin
- Simon Nicol – guitars, vocals, dulcimer
- Dave Pegg – bass, vocals
- Bruce Rowland – drums, percussion
