= Moat on the Ledge: Live at Broughton Castle, August '81 =

Moat on the Ledge

Live album by Fairport Convention
- Released: 1982
- Recorded: 15 August 1981
- Genre: Folk rock
- Label: Woodworm
- Producer: Simon Nicol, Dave Pegg

Fairport Convention chronology
Farewell Farewell (1979)	Moat on the Ledge (1982)	Gladys' Leap (1985)

Professional ratings
Review scores
Source	Rating
Allmusic	3.5/5 stars

Moat on the Ledge: Live at Broughton Castle, August '81 is a live folk rock album by Fairport Convention. The album was produced by Simon Nicol and Dave Pegg.

The album was recorded during an early reunion festival, held at Broughton Castle in August 1981, before that event finally settled in its current Cropredy venue. It features a reunion appearance by Richard Thompson and the first public performance in some years by Judy Dyble.

It was originally released in 1982 as Woodworm WR001 (the number appeared on the label but not the sleeve), it has had various reissues, most recently on the 2007 Eagle Records CD ER 20109-2 and the 2014 Let Them Eat Vinyl LP LETV155LP.

== Track listing ==
Side 1

1. "Walk Awhile" (Dave Swarbrick, Richard Thompson) – 4:08
2. "Country Pie" (Bob Dylan) – 3:23
3. "Rosie" (Swarbrick) – 4:15
4. "Matty Groves" (Traditional, arrangement by Fairport Convention) – 9:30

Side 2

1. "Both Sides Now" (Joni Mitchell) – 3:25
2. "Poor Will and the Hangman" (Thompson, Swarbrick) – 5:37
3. "The Brilliancy Medley" / "Cherokee Shuffle" (Trad., arr. Fairport) – 3:27
4. "Woman or a Man" (Thompson) – 3:20
5. "High School Confidential" (Jerry Lee Lewis, Ron Hargrave) – 4:20

== Personnel ==
- Dave Swarbrick – vocals, fiddle, mandolin
- Richard Thompson – vocals, electric guitar
- Simon Nicol – vocals, electric and acoustic guitars
- Dave Pegg – bass
- Dave Mattacks – drums
- Bruce Rowland – drums

Guest musicians

- Judy Dyble – vocals on "Both Sides Now"
- Ralph McTell – electric guitar on "High School Confidential"
