= "Babbacombe" Lee =

Studio album by Fairport Convention
- Released: November 1971
- Recorded: August–September 1971
- Studios: Sound Techniques, London
- Genre: British folk rock
- Length: 41:20
- Label: Island
- Producers: John Wood & Simon Nicol

Fairport Convention chronology
Angel Delight (1971)	"Babbacombe" Lee (1971)	Rosie (1973)

Professional ratings
Review scores
Source	Rating
Allmusic	3/5 stars

"Babbacombe" Lee is a 1971 album by British folk rock group Fairport Convention, which tells the life story of John Babbacombe Lee, a Victorian-era alleged murderer who was condemned to death but was reprieved after the gallows failed on three occasions to work properly. After the commercial and chart success of its predecessor, Angel Delight, the album sold disappointingly, though it was critically acclaimed, and is regarded by the authors of The Electric Muse (1975) as the first "folk rock opera". It was the band's seventh album since their debut in 1968.

== Concept ==
The album follows John "Babbacombe" Lee's life story. The events of his life are described in song, from his boyhood through his conviction for murder, sentence of death, and the failure to carry out the execution. The songs describe his boyhood poverty, his time in the Royal Navy, and his being invalided out. The album then describes how Lee went to work in the service of a Miss Keyes. While Lee was in her service, she was murdered, and he was accused, tried and convicted of the crime, and sentenced to death; however, when authorities attempted to hang him, the gallows failed three times, resulting in his release. These events are all told in song, and all but one of those songs are originals.

Dave Swarbrick has explained that he conceived the album after discovering a file of old newspaper clippings in a junk shop; this file contained John Lee's own copies of the newspaper articles and was bound by him, signed and dated 30 January 1908.

Because of its relatively complete narrative structure, "Babbacombe" Lee is regarded by the authors of The Electric Muse (1975) as a rock opera, and because of the band's musical style, in particular the first folk rock opera.

== Track listing ==
Songs written by Fairport Convention

The original album listed tracks episodically rather than as discrete tracks, reflecting the structure of the narrative.

Side one
No.	Title	Length
1.	"John's reflection on his boyhood, his introduction to Miss Keyes and The Glen, his restlessness, and his struggles with his family, finally successful, to join the navy."	6:19
2.	"This was the happiest period in his life. All looked set fair for a career until he was stricken with sickness and invalided out of his chosen niche in life. Reluctantly and unhappily he turned to a number of menial occupations and finally returned to the services of Miss Keyes."	10:12
3.	"Tragedy now strikes hard. The world's imagination is caught by the brutal senseless[ness] of the apparent criminal who slays his kind old mistress."	3:57

Side two
No.	Title	Length
1.	"John was hardly more than a bewildered observer at his own trial, not being allowed to say more than a few words. The tides of fate wash him to the condemned cell where he waits three sad weeks for his last night on earth."	7:32
2.	"When it comes, he cannot sleep, but when he does, a strange, prophetic dream comes to him, and helps him to bear the strain of his next day's ordeal as scaffold and its crew try in vain three times to take his life."	13:20

Each of the five sections is composed of a number of songs and fragments of songs that were not listed separately on the original album.

1971 U.S. D.J. release

A&M Records released a banded LP pressing for American radio stations. It removed the two spoken passages during side one, and (like the standard release) listed Fairport Convention as the collective writers of all tracks except "The Sailor's Alphabet," which had the credit "thanks to Bert Lloyd."

1. "Little Did I Think" 2:20
2. "I Was Sixteen/John, My Son" 4:41
3. "The Sailor's Alphabet" 5:52
4. "John Lee" 3:01
5. "Breakfast in Mayfair" 3:10
6. "Trial Song" 3:55
7. "Cell Song" 3:32
8. "The Time Is Near" 2:32
9. "Dream Song" 5:23
10. "Wake Up John" 5:36

2004 Compact Disc listing

The later release of the album abandoned the original five-part division and lists the songs as separate tracks complete with songwriting credits, as follows:

1. "The Verdict" (read by Philip Sterling-Wall) – 0:28
2. "Little Did I Think" (Dave Swarbrick) – 2:19
3. "I Was Sixteen (Part 1)" (Simon Nicol, Dave Pegg) – 1:29
4. "John My Son" (Nicol, Pegg) – 0:44
5. "I Was Sixteen (Part 2)" (Nicol, Pegg) – 1:17
6. "St Ninian's Isle" (Ronald Cooper) / Trumpet Hornpipe (Traditional; arranged by Swarbrick) – 1:14
7. "Sailor's Alphabet" (Traditional; arranged by A.L. Lloyd) – 5:50
8. "John Lee" (Swarbrick) – 3:04
9. "Newspaper Reading" (read by A.L. Lloyd) – 0:46
10. "Breakfast in Mayfair" (Nicol) – 3:09
11. "Trial Song" (Swarbrick, Pegg) – 3:55
12. "Cell Song" (Swarbrick) – 3:35
13. "The Time Is Near" (Pegg) – 2:31
14. "Dream Song" (Swarbrick, Pegg) – 5:24
15. "Wake Up John (Hanging Song)" (Swarbrick, Pegg) – 5:25

Two additional bonus tracks appear on some post-2004 CD releases:

16. "Farewell to a Poor Man's Son" (Swarbrick) – 4:55
17. "Breakfast In Mayfair" (Nicol) 3:59

These tracks were recorded in late 1974 for the BBC 2 documentary about John Lee narrated by Melvyn Bragg. The programme was broadcast in the BBC 2 2nd House series as "The Man They Couldn't Hang – John Lee" on 1 February 1975. Personnel: Dave Swarbrick, Dave Pegg, Dave Mattacks, Jerry Donahue, Simon Nicol (although he was not in the band at this time, Nicol made a brief return for this one-off project), with, for one song, the newly returned Sandy Denny.

=== 2011 "Babbacombe" Lee Live Again ===
In 2011, to celebrate the 40th anniversary of the original album, Fairport performed "Babbacombe" Lee in its entirety on both their Winter Tour and at the Cropredy Festival in August. The performance was released as a CD & digital download in 2012, with a line-up of Simon Nicol, Dave Pegg, Ric Sanders, Chris Leslie and Gerry Conway.

== Personnel ==
Fairport Convention

- Simon Nicol – vocals, guitar, dulcimer (12)
- Dave Mattacks – drums, electric piano (12), harmonium (6,7)
- Dave Swarbrick – vocals, fiddle, mandolin
- Dave Pegg – vocals, bass, mandolin

on 16 and 17:

- Jerry Donahue – lead guitar
- Sandy Denny – vocals on "Breakfast in Mayfair"

== Charts ==
Chart (1972)	Peak position
US Billboard Top LPs & Tape	195
