= Angel Delight (album) =

Studio album by Fairport Convention
- Released: June 1971
- Recorded: February–March 1971
- Studio: Sound Techniques (London)
- Genre: British folk rock
- Length: 36:46
- Label: Island
- Producer: Fairport Convention & John Wood

Fairport Convention chronology
Full House (1970)	Angel Delight (1971)	"Babbacombe" Lee (1971)

Professional ratings
Review scores
Source	Rating
Allmusic	3/5 stars

Angel Delight is the sixth album by the British folk rock band Fairport Convention, released in June 1971. This was the first Fairport Convention album without guitarist Richard Thompson, and the lineup consisted of Simon Nicol (guitar, vocals) (the only original group member), Dave Swarbrick (violin, vocals), Dave Pegg (bass, vocals), and Dave Mattacks (drums).

== Production ==
The title derives from "The Angel" in Little Hadham, Hertfordshire, a former pub which the band were living in at the time, and the eponymous track is autobiographical, referring to "John the Wood" (co-producer), "Dave the Drum" (Mattacks), and even details such as "peer through the haze watching Top of the Pops" and "there's a hole in the wall where a lorry came in" – the band moved out of The Angel shortly after the album's release, partly because a lorry had crashed into Dave Swarbrick's bedroom.

The U.K. album cover included liner notes consisting of dialogue among band members and roadies preparing to leave "The Angel" for a gig, that was replaced on American and Canadian copies by a more straightforward, biographical liner essay.

Musically, Angel Delight progressed little from its predecessors, although an appearance on Top of the Pops as a featured album contributed to its chart success; it reached number eight on the UK Album chart, making it the band's highest charting album in the UK. In the United States the album just made the Billboard Top LPs at number 200.

== Reception ==
Angel Delight has received generally positive reviews from critics. Bruce Eder on AllMusic noted that "the album should strike a responsive chord with any folk or folk-rock enthusiast".

== Track listing ==
Side one
No.	Title	Writer(s)	Length
1.	"Lord Marlborough"	Traditional	3:27
2.	"Sir William Gower"	Traditional	5:00
3.	"Bridge over the River Ash"	Traditional	2:15
4.	"Wizard of the Worldly Game"	Simon Nicol, Dave Swarbrick	4:08
5.	"The Journeyman's Grace"	Swarbrick, Richard Thompson	4:35

Side two
No.	Title	Writer(s)	Length
6.	"Angel Delight"	Nicol, Swarbrick, Dave Pegg, Dave Mattacks	4:10
7.	"Banks of the Sweet Primroses"	Traditional	4:15
8.	"Instrumental Medley: The Cuckoo's Nest / Hardiman the Fiddler / Papa Stoor"	Traditional	3:28
9.	"The Bonny Black Hare"	Traditional	3:08
10.	"Sickness & Diseases"	Swarbrick, Thompson	3:47
Total length:			36:46

Island Remasters CD reissue bonus track
No.	Title	Writer(s)	Length
11.	"The Journeyman's Grace"	Swarbrick, Thompson	3:53

== Personnel ==
- Simon Nicol – lead vocals (2,5), vocals (1,4–7,9,10,11), guitar (1,2,4–8,10,11), bass guitar (9), electric dulcimer (1,9), violin (3)
- Dave Swarbrick – lead vocals (1,4,5,10,11), mandolin (2,6,8,9,10), vocals (2,6,7,9), fiddle (1,5,7,8,11), viola (9), cuckoo (8)
- Dave Pegg – bass guitar (1–2,4–8,10,11), vocals (1,2,4–7,9,10,11), lead guitar (10), viola (9), violin (3)
- Dave Mattacks – drums (1,2,4–11), percussion (8,10), vocals (1,4–7,10–11), harmonium and piano (4), tambourine (6), bass guitar (3)

on 11:

- Richard Thompson – vocals, electric guitar

== Title ==
The cover includes a photo of two cherubs kissing. The title refers to the "delights" of living in the former pub, The Angel Inn, in Little Hadham, Hertfordshire, and is a play on words for the UK dessert, Angel Delight.

== Charts ==
Chart (1971)	Peak position
UK Record Retailer Top LPs	8
US Billboard Top LPs	200
