= Bruce Rowland (drummer) =

English musician (1941–2015)

- Born: 22 May 1941; Park Royal, Middlesex, England
- Died: 29 June 2015 (aged 74) Torquay, Devon, England
- Genres: Rock; folk rock
- Occupations: Drummer; songwriter
- Formerly of: The Grease Band; Fairport Convention

Bruce Rowland (22 May 1941 – 29 June 2015) was an English rock drummer best known for his memberships of The Grease Band and folk rock band Fairport Convention. He was also a prolific session musician.

== Early career ==
Rowland was born at Park Royal, Middlesex, on 22 May 1941. In 1968, he played drums on the Wynder K. Frog album "Out of the Frying Pan", and in 1969 joined The Grease Band, who were then Joe Cocker's backing band. He played for Cocker's performance at the Woodstock Festival, on Cocker's second album, Joe Cocker!, and on the UK top ten hit single "Delta Lady".

In 1970, Cocker and the Grease Band parted company, and Rowland stayed with the latter for their albums The Grease Band (1971) and Amazing Grease. During this period, Rowland also played session for Shawn Phillips, Andy Mackay, Jackie Lomax, Gallagher and Lyle, and others, also contributing drums to the original recording of Jesus Christ Superstar. He spent some time with Ronnie Lane's Slim Chance, including his solo debut album, Anymore for Anymore, and the Lane/Ronnie Wood soundtrack album Mahoney's Last Stand before becoming a full-time sessionist.

== Fairport Convention years ==
Rowland's involvement with Fairport Convention began in 1972, a particularly turbulent year for them, during which they had three drummers. His contributions later appeared on the unreleased, but much bootlegged The Manor Album.

The arrangement became more formal during the recording of Rising for the Moon (1975), when Dave Mattacks left the band during the recording sessions, due to differences between himself and producer Glyn Johns. Following a tour, during which roadie Paul Warren played the drums, Johns suggested Bruce Rowland as a permanent replacement for Mattacks. By the following album, Gottle O'Geer, Rowland had become a full member of the band and his contributions extended beyond drums to keyboards and backing vocals, and this continued with the two succeeding studio albums The Bonny Bunch of Roses and Tipplers Tales, and the 1979 live album Farewell Farewell. Rowland also worked as a session musician, appearing on Bryn Haworth's 1975 album Sunny Side of the Street. Fairport took a break apart from playing concerts between 1979 and 1985 and during this period Rowland (sometimes at the same time as Mattacks) provided drums for these performances; he appears on the live album of the 1981 reunion, Moat on the Ledge. Rowland later quit the music business and moved to Denmark. He spent his later years in Brixham, Devon. He had a paint business and later sold it to retire and concentrate on creating a retirement home for himself and Barbara.

He died on 29 June 2015 of cancer, aged 74, not long after marrying his long term companion Barbara.

Following his death, some of his musical instruments have been auctioned in aid of Rowcroft Hospice.
