= Tipplers Tales =

Studio album by Fairport Convention
- Released: May 1978
- Recorded: February 1978
- Studio: Chipping Norton, Oxfordshire
- Genre: British folk rock
- Length: 36:26
- Label: Vertigo
- Producer: Fairport Convention

Fairport Convention chronology
The Bonny Bunch of Roses (1977)	Tipplers Tales (1978)	Farewell Farewell (1979)

Tipplers Tales is a 1978 album by Fairport Convention, the band's thirteenth studio album since their debut in 1968. Recorded in only ten days, it was the last album the band recorded for Vertigo. Simon Nicol later wrote

"We secured a deal with Vertigo, the one that ended up with them paying us not to make records. It seemed a novelty, like that Marx Brothers line: "How much for you NOT to rehearse?" "Oh, you can't afford it." We did Bonny Bunch and Tipplers Tales then didn't make the other four contracted albums"

Dave Pegg later said

"It wasn't a great deal of money. It was about £30,000. It was the first time we had ever made money out of music. We got like £7,000 each. It was more money than we'd ever had in our lives. This was back in '78 and it enabled us to split up."

Following the release of Tipplers Tales, Fairport Convention did not record for the following seven years until the Gladys' Leap album in 1985.

Several of the traditional folk songs had previously been recorded by A. L. Lloyd accompanied by Dave Swarbrick. The version of "John Barleycorn" here is close to the version recorded by Traffic, as Steve Winwood had been taught the song by the Watersons. The tune is based on "Wir Pflügen" by Johann Schultz, better known as "We Plough the Fields and Scatter", an old English harvest festival hymn.

== Reception ==
Professional ratings
Review scores
Source	Rating
AllMusic	3/5 stars
MusicHound Rock: The Essential Album Guide	3/5 stars

The Manchester Evening News deemed the album "traditional songs and ballads with an uncompromising rock backing," and praised the "undimmed vigour".

Tipplers Tales was described by AllMusic as "not a concept album, even though alcohol is a recurrent motif in many of the traditional numbers", but nonetheless "doing what the band members do best – taking some fine old traditional English jigs, reels, and traditional narratives and putting their own distinctive folk-rock stamp on them".

== Track listing ==
All tracks credited as "Traditional" unless otherwise stated

Side one

1. "Ye Mariners All" (including "Bottom of the Punch Bowl" / "East Nuke of Fyfe") – 4:29
2. "Three Drunken Maidens" – 2:46
3. "Jack O'Rion" (Including "Turnabout" / "Tiree" / "Miss Stevenson's" / "Do It Again" / "March of the Last" / "Turnabout") – 11:04

Side two

1. "Reynard the Fox" – 3:02
2. "Lady of Pleasure" (Allan Taylor) – 2:34
3. "Bankruptured" (Dave Pegg) – 1:55
4. "The Widow of Westmorland" – 3:23
5. "The Hair of the Dogma" (Dave Pegg) – 1:48
6. "As Bitme" (Dave Pegg, Bruce Rowland) – 1:40
7. "John Barleycorn" – 4:39

== Personnel ==
Fairport Convention

- Dave Swarbrick – fiddle, mandolin, mandocello, vocals
- Simon Nicol – electric and acoustic guitars, vocals, dulcimer, piano
- Dave Pegg – bass guitar, guitar, mandolin, vocals
- Bruce Rowland – drums, percussion, electric piano

Technical

- Barry Hammond – engineer

== Release history ==
- 1978, May : Vertigo 9102022 UK LP
- 1989, October : Beat Goes on Records BGO LP72 UK LP
- 2002, November : Vertigo 512988-2 UK CD (with The Bonny Bunch of Roses)
- 2007, February : Vertigo 984305-2 UK CD
