= Liege & Lief =

Studio album by Fairport Convention
- Released: December 1969
- Recorded: 16, 19, 22, 29 October and 1 November 1969
- Studios: Sound Techniques, London
- Genre: British folk rock
- Length: 40:33
- Labels: Island (UK); A&M (US)
- Producer: Joe Boyd

Fairport Convention chronology
Unhalfbricking (1969)	Liege & Lief (1969)	Full House (1970)

Sandy Denny chronology
Unhalfbricking (1969)	Liege & Lief (1969)	Fotheringay (1970)

Liege & Lief is the fourth album by the British folk rock band Fairport Convention. It prominently features Sandy Denny as lead female vocalist and was the first Fairport Convention album to feature future long-serving personnel Dave Swarbrick and Dave Mattacks on violin/mandolin and drums, respectively, as full band members (Swarbrick had previously guested on Unhalfbricking). It is also the first Fairport album on which all songs are either adapted (freely) from traditional British and Celtic folk material (for example "Matty Groves", "Tam Lin"), or else are original compositions (such as "Come All Ye", "Crazy Man Michael") written and performed in a similar style. Although Denny and founding bass player Ashley Hutchings quit the band before the album's release, Fairport Convention has continued to the present day to make music strongly based within the British folk rock idiom, and are still the band most prominently associated with it.

The album was moderately successful, peaking at number 17 on the UK Albums Chart during a 15-week run. It is often credited, though the claim is sometimes disputed, as the first major "British folk rock" album (this term is not to be confused with American-style folk rock, which had first achieved mainstream popularity on both sides of the Atlantic with the Byrds' early work several years prior). The popularity of Liege & Lief did a great deal to establish the new style commercially and artistically as a distinct genre. In an audience vote at the BBC Radio 2 Folk Awards in 2006, the album was voted "Most Influential Folk Album of All Time". It was voted number 254 in the third edition of Colin Larkin's All Time Top 1000 Albums (2000).

== History ==
Following the motorway accident that had killed Martin Lamble, the band were left without a drummer. After the release of Unhalfbricking, Dave Mattacks took over the role. Having previously been a drummer at Mecca Ballrooms, he had to "learn a whole new style of drumming." The virtuoso fiddle and mandolin player Dave Swarbrick, a little older than the rest of the band, had already been in a successful duo with guitarist Martin Carthy. After his appearance on Unhalfbricking, he too joined Fairport full-time.

This incarnation of the band, comprising lead vocalist Denny and newcomers Swarbrick and Mattacks, together with founder members Richard Thompson on lead guitar and some vocals, Simon Nicol on rhythm guitar and Ashley Hutchings on electric bass, rehearsed and put together Liege & Lief over the summer of 1969 at a house in Farley Chamberlayne, near Braishfield, Winchester, launching its material with a sold-out concert in London's Royal Festival Hall on 24 September that year. A bootleg/audience recording of that show exists, but in very poor quality.

Gone were the covers of songs by Bob Dylan and others, replaced by electrified versions of traditional British folksongs ("Reynardine", "Matty Groves", "The Deserter", "Tam Lin"), new compositions by band members but with a "traditional" feel ("Come All Ye", "Farewell, Farewell", "Crazy Man Michael"), (Note: Of the original songs, "Come All Ye" is in the character of a traditional "calling-on song" (as used, for example, by sword dancers, to introduce the members of the side, with their characteristics). "Farewell, Farewell" and "Crazy Man Michael", both with lyrics penned by Thompson, are more obscure in meaning but have been sometimes linked to events surrounding the fatal crash of some months before: the line "will you never cut the cloth" from "Farewell, Farewell" has been suggested to refer to Thompson's then girlfriend Jeannie Franklyn ("Jeannie the Tailor"), killed in the accident, while the crazed protagonist of "Crazy Man Michael", destined to wander the world with guilt for accidentally killing his true love, has been linked to the same event by Thompson himself.) and the first of a long line of instrumental medleys of folk dance tunes driven by Dave Swarbrick's violin playing. Much of the traditional material had been found by Hutchings in Cecil Sharp's collection, maintained by the English Folk Dance and Song Society, although Swarbrick has elsewhere claimed credit as the source of the traditional material used. Also rehearsed and/or recorded, but omitted from the final album, were versions of The Byrds' "Ballad of Easy Rider", the traditional ballad "Sir Patrick Spens" with Denny on lead vocals, and "The Quiet Joys of Brotherhood", a Richard Fariña lyric he had set to a traditional Irish melody, the last two of which were to appear in different arrangements on later albums by Fairport Convention and Sandy Denny, respectively.

Of the rehearsal sessions at Farley Chamberlayne that led to the album, Hutchings later said: "It was a magical time ... and there’s a lot of magic on that album. There was a special feeling in the house, in the room, and also a lot of hidden magic and weirdness on that album. The past is weird, you know, our ancestors did a lot of weird things"; while Thompson said: "Nothing resonates like an old song... To sing something beautifully written, and then refined over hundreds of years, that still has meaning and urgency, that still creates vivid pictures in the mind, is a deeply rewarding thing. I think we hoped the band would achieve some mainstream popularity, so that we could bring the tradition a little closer to people's lives."

The album title is composed of two Middle English words: liege meaning loyal and lief meaning ready. The cover, a gatefold in grey and purple, featured cameo images of the band along with track listing and credits. On the inside of the original gatefold cover, a set of illustrated vignettes told the story of ten different aspects of English traditional music and folklore, including notes on customs such as pace-eggers and the Padstow hobby-horse, as well as collectors such as Francis James Child (of "Child Ballads" fame) and Cecil Sharp.

The band toured the UK for several months, also visiting Denmark, performing the Liege & Lief material before recording it in the studio (also including a performance recorded for BBC radio's Top Gear). However, in November 1969, even before the album was released on 2 December, both Hutchings and Denny quit the band: Hutchings to further pursue traditional music in a new band Steeleye Span, and Denny to form her new venture Fotheringay, with more emphasis on her own original compositions. (Note: The exact reasons for the departures of first Denny, and then Hutchings, are complex and still somewhat unclear. Denny was reportedly unhappy that the band wished to continue in a traditional direction subsequent to Liege and Lief, and she would have preferred the latter to be a one-off venture; there is also the suggestion she was in fact sacked from the band over her reluctance to travel to overseas dates. Also as recorded in Mick Houghton's biography of Denny, Hutchings later said: "I don't know why I left Fairport; it wasn't to form Steeleye Span, which I did do. After I left the band I had dizzy spells and there was a downward path into a minor breakdown that I had... If you had asked us both – and this is just my theory – two or three months later, "Would you like to rejoin [...], I bet we both would have said yes." Elsewhere, Hutchings goes on to say that his breakdown was "... a delayed reaction to the crash, no question about it.") Subsequent to these departures, only Hutchings was replaced (by newcomer Dave Pegg) and thus it was a reduced, 5-man version of the band that went on to record their follow-up album, Full House, the next year.

In 2007 a double album "Liege and Lief Deluxe Edition" was released; the second CD consisted mainly of BBC radio live performances and two stylistically uncharacteristic outtakes, the standards "The Lady Is a Tramp" and "Fly Me to the Moon".

== Reception and influence ==
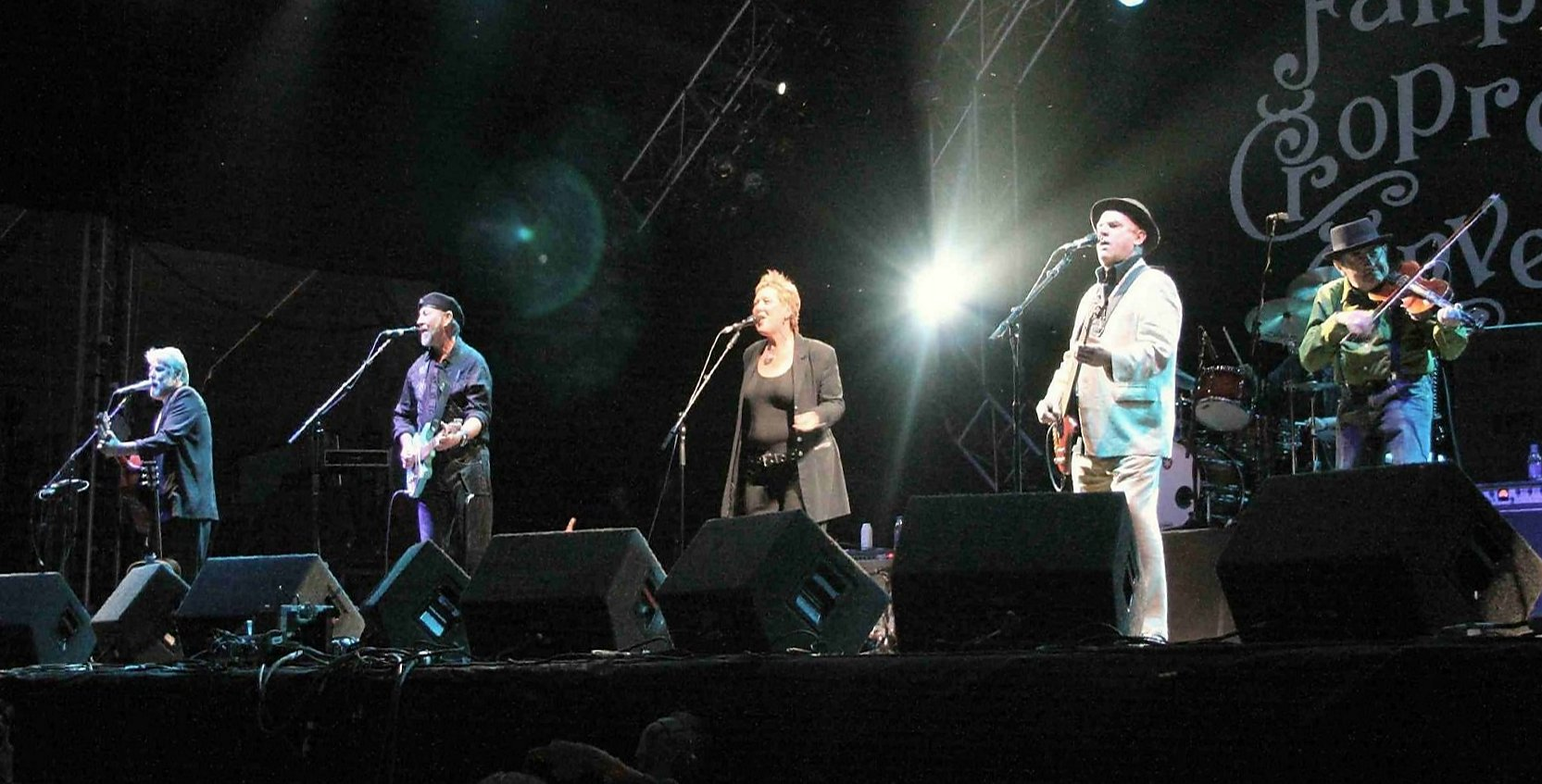
Reunion line-up, August 2007, with guest vocalist Chris While replacing Denny

Professional ratings
Review scores
Source	Rating
AllMusic	5/5 stars
The Village Voice	B−

Liege & Lief was promoted by John Peel on his Top Gear radio programme and the album spent fifteen weeks in the UK album chart, reaching number 17. In a contemporary review, John Mendelsohn of Rolling Stone recommended the album only to devotees of "quietly arty traditional folk" and felt that "Deserter" is the only "arresting" song, as "not even the originals match up to the group-composed material on previous albums." Robert Christgau of The Village Voice was less enthusiastic, writing that because of his "anti-folk" tastes, he was disappointed with the album's more traditional material after Unhalfbricking.

Nevertheless, the album has come to be regarded as a major influence in the development of British folk rock. It was voted the 'most important folk album of all time' by BBC Radio 2 listeners in 2002, and at the 2006 BBC Radio 2 Folk Awards Liege and Lief won the award for Most influential Folk Album of all time. At the event, the original line-up of Simon Nicol, Richard Thompson, Ashley Hutchings, Dave Swarbrick, Dave Mattacks, with Chris While replacing Sandy Denny, performed Matty Groves. Georgia Lucas, the daughter of Sandy Denny and Trevor Lucas, accepted the award on behalf of her late mother. This commemoration was repeated on 10 August 2007 at Cropredy, when the complete album was performed (see "External links"). Prior to that occasion, effective reunions of most of the Liege and Lief lineup had performed at previous Cropredy festivals, for example with Cathy Lesurf as featured vocalist at the 1983 reunion for performances of "Come All Ye", "Reynardine", "Crazy Man Michael", "Farewell, Farewell" and "Tam Lin" (the all instrumental "Lark in the Morning" medley also performed), and with Vikki Clayton as lead female vocalist performing "The Deserter", "Tam Lin" and "Crazy Man Michael" at the 25th anniversary concert in 1992, the same line-up performing "Come All Ye", "Reynardine" and "Matty Groves" at the 1997 30th anniversary concert.

In a retrospective review, AllMusic's Mark Deming said of the album that "while [it] was the most purely folk-oriented Fairport Convention album to date, it also rocked hard in a thoroughly original and uncompromising way". In June 2007, Mojo magazine listed Liege & Lief at number 58 in its list of "100 Records that changed the world". In his 2010 book on the UK folk-rock music scene Electric Eden, author Rob Young devoted 13 pages to the Liege and Lief period and its resulting album, stating that the album "retains a coherence and integrity shared by very few British folk-rock records" and that in its music, "... Fate is exacted; English balladry displays its full menace and mystery; and there's a tentative reflection upon pain and loss, tainted by hard experience". For Patrick Humphries, on the other hand, writing in 1996, the album is less than 100% successful: "Come all Ye" sounds "rather forced", the band's reading of "The Deserter" is described as "pedestrian", and "Tam Lin" is described as "leaden" and the soloing on it as "timid"; he does, however, praise "Matty Groves" as "relish[ing] the interplay between Swarbrick and Thompson", "Reynardine" for the quality of Denny's singing, the instrumental medley as giving Swarbrick's fiddle a chance to shine (along with Thompson's and Hutchings' guitar and bass contributions), "Crazy Man Michael" as "a substantial conclusion to the album", and "Farewell, Farewell" as "a flawless example of what Fairport were capable of at their peak."

== Track listing ==
Side one
No.	Title	Writer(s)	Length
1.	"Come All Ye"	Sandy Denny, Ashley Hutchings	4:55
2.	"Reynardine"	Traditional; arranged by Fairport Convention	4:33
3.	"Matty Groves"	Traditional; arranged by Fairport Convention	8:08
4.	"Farewell, Farewell"	words: Richard Thompson; tune: Traditional	2:38

Side two
No.	Title	Writer(s)	Length
5.	"The Deserter"	Traditional; arranged by Fairport Convention	4:10
6.	"Medley": I. "The Lark in the Morning"; II. "Rakish Paddy"; III. "Foxhunter's Jig"; IV. "Toss the Feathers"	Traditional; arranged by Dave Swarbrick	4:00
7.	"Tam Lin"	Traditional; arranged by Dave Swarbrick	7:20
8.	"Crazy Man Michael"	words: Richard Thompson; tune: Dave Swarbrick	4:35
Total length:			40:33

CD reissue previously unreleased bonus tracks
No.	Title	Writer(s)	Length
9.	"Sir Patrick Spens" (Sandy Denny vocal version)	Traditional; arranged by Fairport Convention
10.	"Quiet Joys of Brotherhood" (take 1)	Traditional; arranged by Denny, Thompson, Swarbrick and Dave Mattacks; words by Richard Fariña

2007 deluxe edition disc two: studio outtakes and BBC sessions
No.	Title	Length
1.	"Sir Patrick Spens" (Sandy Denny vocal version)	3:59
2.	"The Quiet Joys of Brotherhood" (take 4)	5:59
3.	"The Ballad of Easy Rider"	4:53
4.	"Tam Lin" (BBC version)	7:46
5.	"Medley: I. The Lark in the Morning; II. Rakish Paddy; III. Foxhunter's Jig; IV. Toss the Feathers" (BBC version)	4:13
6.	"Sir Patrick Spens" (BBC version)	3:44
7.	"Reynardine" (BBC version)	4:19
8.	"The Quiet Joys of Brotherhood" (take 1)	7:50
9.	"The Lady Is a Tramp" (BBC version)	2:11
10.	"Medley": I. "The Lady Is a Tramp"; II. "In Other Words (Fly Me to the Moon)"" (hidden track)	2:21

Tracks 4, 5, 6, and 7 on disc two were recorded live for John Peel's BBC Top Gear show. They first aired on 27 September 1969. Track 10 is previously unissued.

== Production ==
- Produced by Joe Boyd for Witchseason Productions, Ltd.
- Recorded at Sound Techniques Ltd., London
- Engineered by John Wood
- Cover photography – Eric Hayes
- Sleeve concept & design – Fairport & Roberta Nicol
- Design co-ordination – Diogenic Attempts Ltd

== Personnel ==
- Sandy Denny – vocals
- Dave Swarbrick – fiddle, viola
- Richard Thompson – electric & acoustic guitars, backing vocals
- Simon Nicol – electric, 6-string & 12-string acoustic guitars, backing vocals
- Ashley Hutchings – bass guitar, backing vocals
- Dave Mattacks – drums, percussion

== Certifications ==
Certifications for Liege & Lief
Region	Certification	Certified units/sales
United Kingdom (BPI)	Gold	100,000^{^}
^{^} Shipments figures based on certification alone.

== Bibliography ==
- Heylin, Clinton. No More Sad Refrains – The Life and Times of Sandy Denny. Helter Skelter, 2000; ISBN 1900924358
- Hinton, Brian and Wall, Geoff. Ashley Hutchings – The Guv'nor and the Rise of Folk Rock. Helter Skelter, 2002; ISBN 1900924323
- Houghton, Mick. I've Always Kept a Unicorn – The Biography of Sandy Denny. Faber & Faber, 2015; ISBN 0571278914
- Humphries, Patrick. Meet on the Ledge – A History of Fairport Convention. Eel Pie, 1982; ISBN 0906008468
- Humphries, Patrick. Richard Thompson – Strange Affair: The Biography. Virgin Books, 1996; ISBN 0863699936
- Hutchings, Ashley. A Little Music. Island Music, 1976 (no ISBN)
- Young, Rob. Electric Eden – Unearthing Britain's Visionary Music. Faber & Faber, 2010; ISBN 9780865478565 (includes an extensive account of the Liege and Lief period and resulting album on pp. 253–265)
