= Gottle O'Geer =

Studio album by Fairport Convention
- Released: May 1976
- Recorded: Island (London); Sawmills (Cornwall, England)
- Genre: Folk rock
- Length: 30:35
- Label: Island
- Producer: Bruce Rowland

Fairport Convention chronology
| Rising for the Moon (1975) | Gottle O'Geer (1976) | The Bonny Bunch of Roses (1977) |

Professional ratings
Review scores
| Source | Rating |
|---|---|
| AllMusic | 2/5 stars |

Gottle O'Geer (credited to "Fairport" and to "Fairport Featuring Dave Swarbrick" in the US) is the eleventh studio album by English folk rock band Fairport Convention. The album was released through Island Records in May 1976.

The departure of Sandy Denny, Trevor Lucas and Jerry Donahue following Rising for the Moon in 1975 left Fairport Convention reduced to Dave Swarbrick, Dave Pegg and Bruce Rowland, and contractually obliged to produce one more album for Island Records. This album was the result, and AllMusic described it as "listless".

The venture was originally intended to be a solo album for Swarbrick, who later said of it: "Gottle O'Geer, I would like to say once and for all was not ever supposed to be a Fairport album. It was to be my solo album, and I wish, along with most other people, that it had remained that way. Chris Blackwell, who to my mind is the richest, clueless, most unscrupulous pillock it was ever my misfortune to meet, had other ideas." As such, the basic line-up of Swarbrick and rhythm section was augmented by numerous guest performers.

Simon Nicol was asked to assist in sorting out the project: "... there was plenty on tape but it was a bit of a ragbag really. Peggy and Swarb asked me if I'd come in to engineer it for them. It was huge fun to be involved in. Island just gave us the keys and said 'turn out the lights when you leave' so there were a lot of all-night sessions in the studio."

The album's title comes from the reputed inability of less skilled ventriloquists to pronounce "bottle of beer".

== Track listing ==
Side one

1. "When First into This Country" (Traditional) – 2:30
2. "Our Band" (Dave Swarbrick) – 2:04
3. "Lay Me Down Easy" (Rowland, Swarbrick) – 5:15
4. "Cropredy Capers" (Pegg, Rowland, Swarbrick) – 3:09
5. "The Frog Up the Pump" (Jig Medley) (Traditional) – 3:16

Side two

1. "Don't Be Late" (Rowland, Swarbrick) – 3:24
2. "Sandy's Song" (Sandy Denny) – 3:37
3. "Friendship Song" (Benny Gallagher, Graham Lyle) – 3:01
4. "Limey's Lament" (Rowland, Swarbrick) – 4:35

Bonus track on 2007 CD re-release

1. "Angles Brown" (Pegg, Swarbrick) – 4:00

== Personnel ==
=== Fairport ===
- Dave Swarbrick – vocals, fiddle, viola, mandolin, mandocello, acoustic guitar, autoharp, electric dulcimer;
- Dave Pegg – bass guitar, mandolin, backing vocals;
- Bruce Rowland – drums, percussion, piano, organ, backing vocals

=== Additional personnel ===
- Simon Nicol – electric guitar (9)
- Martin Carthy – acoustic guitar (4)
- Nick Judd – piano (2, 4)
- Robert Palmer – harmonica, backing vocals (6)
- Benny Gallagher – accordion (8), backing vocals (2, 6, 9)
- Graham Lyle – dobro (8), backing vocals (2, 6, 8)
- Jimmy Jewell – saxophone (6)
- Henry Lowther – trumpet, flugelhorn (6)
- Eric Johns – electric guitar (1, 7)
- Ian Wilson – electric guitar (4)
- Bob Brady – backing vocals (6)
- Roger Burridge – backing vocals (6)
- Engineering: Simon Nicol (assisted by Dick Cuthell at Island and Tony Cox at Sawmill)

== Release history ==
- 1976, May : UK LP Island ILPS 9389
- 1999 : UK CD Island IMCD 262
- 2007, February : UK CD Island 984,587-6
