= Gladys' Leap =

Studio album by Fairport Convention
- Released: August 1985
- Recorded: April–May 1985
- Studio: Woodworm Studio, Barford St. Michael, Oxfordshire
- Genre: British folk rock
- Length: 38:01
- Label: Woodworm
- Producer: Simon Nicol, Dave Mattacks, Dave Pegg

Fairport Convention chronology
Tipplers Tales (1978)	Gladys' Leap (1985)	Expletive Delighted! (1986)

Gladys' Leap is the fourteenth studio album by Fairport Convention, released in August 1985. It was recorded in April and May 1985 at Woodworm Studios, Barford St. Michael, Oxfordshire, UK. It was produced and engineered by Simon Nicol, Dave Mattacks and Dave Pegg and the assistant engineers were Tim Matyear and Mark Powell. The album features the first contributions to a Fairport album by founding member Richard Thompson since Rosie in 1973. Thompson wrote the opening track "How Many Times" and played lead guitar on "Head in a Sack".

The title comes from Gladys Hillier, who was a postwoman for Cranham, a village near Stroud in Gloucestershire, England. As a short-cut, to save a two-mile walk, she used to jump a three feet (~ 1 metre) wide brook, a tributary of Painswick Stream, on her round. In 1977 the Ordnance Survey agreed to name the spot in her honour and in 2005, when Hillier was 88, a footbridge was built across the stream (a signpost lists her period of service as 1942-1977). Fairport heard the story, and named the album in Gladys' honour.

Professional ratings
Review scores
Source	Rating
Allmusic	3/5 stars

== Track listing ==
Side one (The Folkside)

1. "How Many Times" (Richard Thompson) - 3:29
2. "Bird from the Mountain" (Ralph McTell) - 4:51
3. "Honour and Praise" (John Richards) - 5:21
4. "The Hiring Fair" (Ralph McTell, Dave Mattacks) - 5:53

Side two (The Backside)

1. Instrumental Medley '85 - 5:08
  1. "The Riverhead" (Dave Pegg)
  2. "Gladys' Leap" (Dave Pegg)
  3. "The Wise Maid" (Traditional; arrangement by Simon Nicol and Dave Pegg)
2. "My Feet are Set for Dancing" (Cathy Lesurf, arranged by Bill Martin) - 4:01
3. "Wat Tyler" (Ralph McTell, Simon Nicol) - 5:36
4. "Head in a Sack" (Dave Whetstone) - 4:23

2001 CD reissue bonus tracks from the 1982 Cropredy festival

1. "Angel Delight" (Swarbrick, Pegg, Nicol, Mattacks) – 4:32
2. "Polly On the Shore" (Lucas, Pegg, Swarbrick) – 5:15
3. "Lucky Old Sun" (Smith, Gillespie) – 5:36

== Personnel ==
Fairport Convention

- Simon Nicol - vocals, electric & acoustic guitars
- Dave Pegg - bass guitar, mandolin, bouzouki, double bass, vocals
- Dave Mattacks - drums, drum machine, keyboards, percussion

Additional personnel

- Ric Sanders - violin ("Bird from the Mountain", "The Hiring Fair", Instrumental Medley)
- Richard Thompson - electric guitar ("Head in a Sack")
- Cathy Lesurf - vocal ("My Feet Are Set for Dancing")
- Harold Wells - spoken intro to "Bird from the Mountain"
