= Dave Swarbrick =

English folk-rock musician (1941–2016)

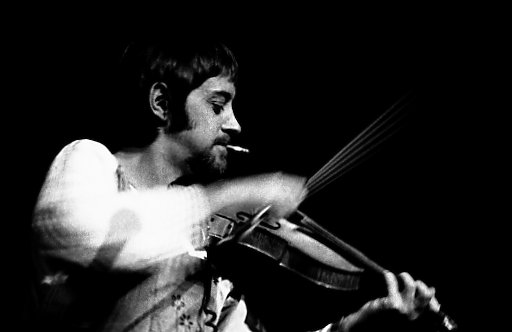
- Swarbrick performing in 1977

Background information
- Also known as: Swarb
- Born: David Cyril Eric Swarbrick; 5 April 1941; Stoneleigh, Surrey, England
- Died: 3 June 2016 (aged 75) Aberystwyth, Wales
- Genres: Folk music; British folk rock
- Occupations: Musician; songwriter; arranger
- Instruments: Violin; mandolin; viola; guitar; vocals
- Years active: 1960s–2016
- Labels: Transatlantic; Sonet; Logo

David Cyril Eric Swarbrick (5 April 1941 – 3 June 2016) was an English traditional folk musician and songwriter who primarily played the violin. He was one of the most highly regarded musicians produced by the second British folk revival, contributing to some of the most important groups and projects of the 1960s, and he became a much sought-after session musician, which led him throughout his career to work with many of the major figures in folk and folk rock music.

A member of Fairport Convention from 1969, he assisted on their influential album Liege & Lief (1969) which is credited with initiating the British folk rock movement. This, and his subsequent career, helped create greater interest in British traditional music and was also influential within mainstream rock. After 1970 he emerged as Fairport Convention's leading figure and guided the band through a series of important albums until their temporary disbandment in 1979. Fairport Convention claimed in 1998 on The Cropredy Box album, that his style has been copied or developed by almost every British and many world folk violin players who have followed him.

He also played in a series of smaller, acoustic units and engaged in solo projects. He maintained a massive output of recordings and a significant profile and made a major contribution to the interpretation of traditional British music.

== History ==
=== Early career to 1968 ===
Swarbrick was born on 5 April 1941 in Stoneleigh, Surrey. His family moved to Linton, near Grassington, North Yorkshire, where he learned to play the violin. In the late 1940s the family moved to Birmingham, where he attended Birmingham College of Art (now absorbed into the Birmingham Institute of Art and Design at Birmingham City University) in the late 1950s, with the intention of becoming a printer. After winning a talent contest with his skiffle band, playing guitar, he was introduced to Beryl and Roger Marriott, influential local folk musicians. The Marriotts took him under their wing and Beryl, discovering that he had played the violin classically up until the skiffle craze, actively encouraged him to switch back to the fiddle and he joined the Beryl Marriott Ceilidh Band.

He joined the Ian Campbell Folk Group in 1960 and embarked on his recording career, playing on one single, three EPs and seven albums with the group over the next few years. He contributed significantly to the BBC Radio Ballads series on recordings with the three most important figures in the British folk movement of the time A. L. Lloyd, Ewan MacColl, and MacColl's wife Peggy Seeger, as well as part of several collections to which the Ian Campbell Group contributed.

From 1965 he began to work with Martin Carthy, supporting him on his eponymous first album. The association was such a success that the next recording, Second Album (1966), gave them equal billing. They produced another four highly regarded recordings between 1967 and 1968, including Byker Hill (1967), whose innovative arrangements of traditional songs made it one of the most influential folk albums of the decade. Swarbrick also played on albums by Julie Felix, A. L. Lloyd and on the radio ballads, and became perhaps the most highly regarded interpreter of traditional material on the violin and certainly one of the most sought-after session musicians.

In 1967, Swarbrick released his first solo album Rags, Reels and Airs (on Topic Records), with guests Martin Carthy and Diz Disley, which has since become a benchmark for generations of folk fiddlers.

=== Session work and Fairport Convention in 1969–79 ===
"A Sailor's Life"
Sample of "A Sailor's Life", from Unhalfbricking

In 1969, Swarbrick was working as a session musician. During recording sessions for the Unhalfbricking album, Fairport Convention's manager, Joe Boyd, hired Swarbrick to play some overdubs on the Richard Thompson-penned track "Cajun Woman". Fairport had decided to play a traditional song "A Sailor's Life", which Swarbrick had previously recorded with Carthy in 1969, and he was asked to contribute fiddle to the session. The result was an eleven-minute mini-epic that appeared on the 1969 album Unhalfbricking and which marked out a new direction for the band.

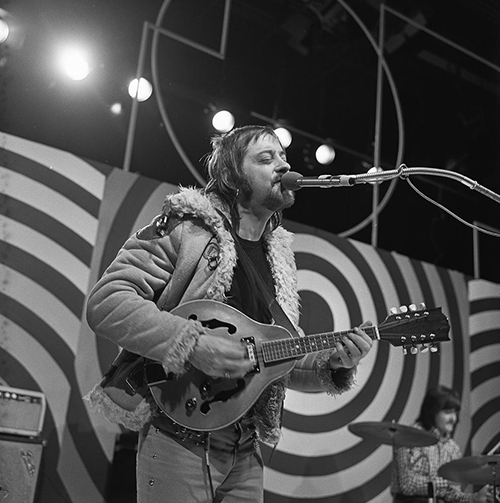
Swarbrick as a member of Fairport Convention, appearing on the Dutch television show TopPop in 1972

Subsequently, Swarbrick was asked to join the group and was the first fiddler on the folk scene to electrify the violin. Martin Carthy later recalled that Swarbrick had been indecisive about joining, telling Carthy: "I just played with this guy Richard [Thompson] and I want to play with him for the rest of my life." Together, now with Swarbrick co-writing with Richard Thompson "Crazy Man Michael", they created the groundbreaking album Liege & Lief (1969). His energetic and unique fiddle style was essential to the new sound and direction of the band, most marked on the medley of four jigs and reels that Swarbrick arranged for the album and which were to become an essential part of almost every subsequent Fairport performance. Before the album was released, key members of the band, founder Ashley Hutchings and singer, guitarist and songwriter Sandy Denny left, and Swarbrick stayed on with the band full-time, excited by the possibilities of performing traditional music in a rock context. His greater maturity, knowledge of folk song, reputation and personality meant that he soon emerged as the leading force in the band and continued to be so for the next decade, encouraging the band to bring in Dave Pegg, another graduate of the Ian Campbell Folk Group, on bass. However, Swarbrick was already beginning to suffer the hearing problems that would dog the rest of his career.

"Sloth"
Sample of "Sloth", from Full House (1970)

The first album of this new line-up, Full House (1970), although not as commercially successful as Liege & Lief, sold relatively well, and remains highly regarded. Like Liege & Lief it contained interpretations of traditional tunes, including the epic "Sir Patrick Spens" and another instrumental arranged by Swarbrick, "Dirty Linen", but also contained songs jointly penned by Swarbrick and guitarist Richard Thompson, including what would become their opening live song "Walk Awhile", and the nine-minute long anti-war anthem "Sloth". The partnership produced another three songs on Full House. However, the fruitful collaboration was ended when Thompson departed the band soon after. The song "Sloth" has since been covered by other artists such as Plainsong and Nikki Sudden. After Swarbrick's death in 2016, poet Ian McMillan recalled how "his playing on Fairport Convention's "Sloth" broke my heart every time".

As ex-Fairport Convention members embarked on their own careers, Swarbrick was often called upon to provide musical support, as he did for albums by Sandy Denny and Richard Thompson. He also played on some of the most significant folk albums of the era, including work by John Renbourn, Al Stewart and Peter Bellamy. In the second half of the 1970s, he began to release a series of solo albums.

Without Thompson, Swarbrick shouldered even more responsibility for leadership, writing and singing and the result was a folk-rock opera album "Babbacombe" Lee, mostly written by Swarbrick (telling the true story of John Babbacombe Lee, a man convicted of murder and sentenced to hang. The scaffold apparatus failed three times and Lee survived to spend much of his life in penal servitude). The result gained the band some mainstream attention, including a BBC TV programme devoted to the work, but was a mixed artistic achievement, with critics noting the lack of variety in the album. When Simon Nicol quit the band in 1971, Swarbrick was the longest-standing member and responsible for keeping the group afloat through a bewildering series of line-up changes and problematic projects.

The next album Rosie is chiefly notable for the title track, written by Swarbrick, which is perhaps the song most closely associated with him, but overall it was not a critical success. The following release, Nine (1974), relied heavily on the writing partnership between Swarbrick and new member Trevor Lucas, but it perhaps lacked the vitality of previous collaborations. The fortunes of the band rallied when Sandy Denny rejoined in 1974 and on the resulting album Rising for the Moon Swarbrick took more of a backseat in writing and singing.

After Denny's final departure from the band, Swarbrick managed to steer it through three more studio albums, turning a solo project into a Fairport album Gottle O'Geer (1976) and two albums for Vertigo; The Bonny Bunch of Roses (1977) and Tipplers Tales (1978), which sold poorly, but have since been seen as containing some of Swarbrick's best fiddle work. However, all this was done amid financial and contractual difficulties and Swarbrick's hearing problems were becoming severe and were aggravated by amplified performances. In 1979 the band played a farewell concert in Cropredy, Oxfordshire, then disbanded.

=== Return to the folk circuit from 1980 ===
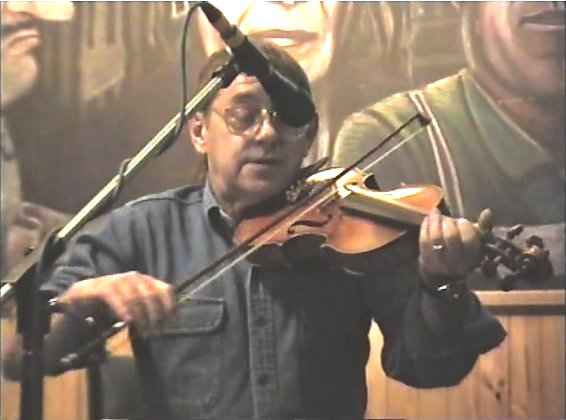
Swarbrick on stage in July 1995 (performing solo)

Apart from occasional reunions, particularly at the Cropredy Festival, Swarbrick's performing career since 1980 focused on small venues and acoustic performances. His first project was a highly regarded duo with former Fairport guitarist Simon Nicol, which produced three albums. In 1984 Swarbrick decided to move to Scotland, while Nicol remained in Oxfordshire and the partnership dissolved. This also meant that he was unavailable when Fairport regrouped to record the album Gladys' Leap (1985). When the band re-formed in 1986 it did so without him, although he played with them on several occasions, particularly at the Cropredy Festival.

By the time of the Fairport reformation Swarbrick was already occupied with his next project as part of a quartet under the name Whippersnapper, with the highly regarded musicians Martin Jenkins, Chris Leslie and Kevin Dempsey. The group produced four albums between 1985 and 1989. From this point Swarbrick left to renew his partnership with Martin Carthy, but after two albums: Life And Limb (1990) and Skin And Bone (1992), he emigrated to Australia.

There he formed a new partnership with guitarist and singer-songwriter Alistair Hulett. They produced one album in Australia, Saturday Johnny and Jimmy The Rat (1996), and following Hulett and Swarbrick's return to the UK soon after, made two more; The Cold Grey Light of Dawn and Red Clydeside. In this period Swarbrick guested on projects with some of the most highly regarded figures in folk rock, including Steve Ashley, John Kirkpatrick and Bert Jansch, as well as continuing with solo work and recording and touring with Martin Carthy. He also guested with artists who were not folk musicians. In 1991 he toured with ex-Bonzo Dog Doo-Dah Band frontman Vivian Stanshall as part of Stanshall's return to the live stage in "Dog Ends".

For many years Swarbrick suffered steadily worsening health due to years of heavy smoking, resulting in emphysema. There was considerable embarrassment for The Daily Telegraph newspaper when in April 1999 it published a premature obituary for Swarbrick after he was admitted to hospital with a chest infection. He commented, "It's not the first time I've died in Coventry."

Dave and Christine Pegg launched SwarbAid, including a fund-raising concert at Birmingham's Symphony Hall in July 1999 and releasing a limited-edition 1999 live EP 'SwarbAid' with Fairport Convention in order to raise funds for Swarbrick whilst his poor health was preventing him from working. After another health relapse, they launched SwarbAid II, with a similar concert, in 2004. Swarbrick received a double lung transplant in October 2004 at The Queen Elizabeth Hospital, Birmingham and thereafter resumed his career with fervour, as a solo performer and annually on tour in the UK, every autumn, with Martin Carthy.

=== Later work ===
In 2006 Swarbrick resumed touring again with ex-Fairporter Maartin Allcock and Kevin Dempsey as Swarb's Lazarus, producing the album Live and Kicking (2006); and appearing at the Cropredy Festival. The band's name was chosen as a reference to the premature publishing of Swarbrick's obituary, by the Daily Telegraph in 1999. On 10 August 2007, Swarbrick joined the 1969 Fairport Convention line-up at Cropredy with Chris While standing in for the late Sandy Denny, to perform the whole of the album Liege & Lief. Most notably, The Liege & Lief line-up plus Chris While had initially reformed to play at the BBC Radio 2 folk awards in the same year.

Swarbrick's much lauded solo album Raison d'être (Shirty Records) was released in July 2010.

In 2014 Swarbrick released a full-length album with the Canadian musician Jason Wilson entitled Lion Rampant. The critically acclaimed album included special guests Martin Carthy, Peggy Seeger, Pee Wee Ellis and John Kirkpatrick.. Working with the Jason Wilson Band, brought Swarbrick back playing with a significant big group again, contributing to gigs playing around Canada and the UK. British Folk music critic Ken Hunt described the album: "Head and shoulders, the most eclectic, catholic and coherent musical banquet of 2014 thus far." Their final studio album together; Kailyard Tales, was released on 12 January 2018.

In April and May 2014, Swarbrick completed a 17-venue tour of the UK, supported by folk trio Said the Maiden at his personal request. The tour, organised by Helen Meisner of the Folkstock Foundation, of which Swarbrick was the patron, also featured at each venue young, up-coming folk artists, several of them from the Folkstock stable.

Swarbrick and Carthy made their final UK tour in autumn 2015.

Swarbrick died from pneumonia on 3 June 2016, at hospital in Aberystwyth.

== Personal life ==
Swarbrick was married several times. He had three children (Emily, Alexander and Isobel), eight grandchildren, and two great-grandchildren. His last marriage was to the painter Jill Swarbrick-Banks. They met in 1998 and married at Coventry Register Office the following year. They lived together in Coventry and mid-Wales until his death in June 2016.

== Awards ==
In 2003, he was awarded a 'Gold Badge' by the English Folk Dance and Song Society and the 'Gold Badge of Merit' by the British Academy of Composers and Songwriters. In 2004 he was given a Lifetime Achievement Award at the BBC Radio 2 Folk Awards. At the 2006 Folk Awards he shared with current and past Fairport Convention members when they received an award when their seminal album Liege & Lief was voted 'Most Influential Folk Album of All Time' by Radio 2 listeners. At the 2007 awards Martin Carthy and Dave Swarbrick won the 'Best Duo' Award. At the 2012 Fatea Awards, Swarbrick was awarded The Life Time Achievement Award.

== Discography ==
Taking account of his early work with the Ian Campbell Folk Group, as well as with Ewan MacColl, A. L. Lloyd and Peggy Seeger, and including his work as a guest musician on the albums of many artists, Swarbrick can be credited with over 167 album appearances.

=== With Fairport Convention ===
- Unhalfbricking (Island, 1969)
- Liege & Lief (Island, 1969)
- Full House (Island, 1970)
- Angel Delight (Island, 1971)
- "Babbacombe" Lee (Island, 1971)
- Rosie (Island, 1973)
- Nine (A&M, 1973)
- Rising for the Moon (Island, 1975)
- Gottle O'Geer (Island, 1976)
- The Bonny Bunch of Roses (Vertigo, 1977)
- Tipplers Tales (Vertigo, 1978)

=== With Martin Carthy ===
- Martin Carthy (Fontana Records, 1965)
- Second Album (Fontana Records, 1966)
- No Songs (EP) (Fontana Records, 1967)
- Rags, Reels and Airs (with Diz Dizley) (Topic, 1967)
- Byker Hill (Fontana, 1967)
- But Two Came By (Fontana, 1968)
- Prince Heathen (Fontana, 1969)
- Selections (collection) (Pegasus, 1971)
- Life And Limb (Special Delivery, 1990)
- Skin And Bone (Special Delivery, 1992)
- Both Ears and the Tail: Live at the Folkus Folk Club, Nottingham, 1966 (Atrax, 2000)
- Straws In The Wind (Topic, 2006)
- Walnut Creek (Shirty, 2014)

=== Solo albums ===
- Swarbrick (Transatlantic, 1976)
- Swarbrick 2 (Transatlantic, 1977)
- Lift The Lid and Listen (Sonet, 1978)
- The Ceilidh Album (Sonet, 1978)
- Smiddyburn (Logo, 1981)
- Flittin' (Spindrift, 1983)
- When the Battle is Over [compilation from: Swarbrick (1976); Swarbrick 2 (1977); Smiddyburn (1981)] (Conifer, 1986)
- Live at Jackson's Lane (Musikfolk, 1996)
- Dave Swarbrick, Swarb! (Free Reed, 2002)
- English Fiddler: Swarbrick plays Swarbrick (Naxos World, 2003)
- Lion Rampant (with Jason Wilson) (Wheel/Proper, 2014)
- Raison d'être (Shirty, 2010)
- Kailyard Tales (with Jason Wilson) (Wheel/Proper, 2018)

== Sources ==
- Humphries, P. (1997). Meet on the Ledge: Fairport Convention, the Classic Years (2nd ed.). Virgin.
- Sweers, B. (2005). Electric Folk: The Changing Face of English Traditional Music. Oxford University Press.
- Redwood, Fred; Woodward, Martin (1995). The Woodworm Era: The story of today's Fairport Convention. Thatcham: Jeneva Publishing. ISBN 0-9525860-0-2.
