= By Popular Request =

Studio album by Fairport Convention
- Released: January 2012
- Genre: British folk rock
- Length: 54:42
- Label: Matty Grooves Records
- Producer: John Gale with Fairport Convention

Fairport Convention chronology
| Festival Bell (2011) | By Popular Request (2012) | Myths and Heroes (2015) |

By Popular Request is a 2012 album by British folk rock band Fairport Convention, released in January 2012 on the band's own Matty Grooves Records label. The band have released over 30 albums since their debut, Fairport Convention, in 1968. The album consists of studio re-recordings of previous material as selected by popular request via the band's website.

== Overview ==
The album was released to coincide with the band's 45th anniversary, and consists of thirteen brand new versions of songs from the band's back catalogue, selected by fans through the band's website.

== Track listing ==
1. "Walk Awhile" (Richard Thompson, Dave Swarbrick) (Originally from Full House)
2. "Crazy Man Michael" (Richard Thompson, Dave Swarbrick) (Originally from Liege and Lief)
3. "The Hiring Fair" (Ralph McTell) (Originally from Gladys' Leap)
4. "The Hexhamshire Lass" (Traditional; arranged by Fairport Convention) (Originally from Nine)
5. "Red and Gold" (Ralph McTell) (Originally from Red & Gold)
6. "Sir Patrick Spens" (Traditional; arranged by Fairport Convention) (Originally from Full House)
7. "Genesis Hall" (Richard Thompson) (Originally from Unhalfbricking)
8. "Farewell Farewell" (Richard Thompson) (Originally from Liege and Lief)
9. "Rosie" (Dave Swarbrick) (Originally from Rosie)
10. "Matty Groves" (Traditional; arranged by Fairport Convention) (Originally from Liege and Lief)
11. "Fotheringay" (Sandy Denny) (Originally from What We Did on Our Holidays)
12. "Jewel in the Crown" (Julie Matthews) (Originally from Jewel in the Crown)
13. "Meet on the Ledge" (Richard Thompson) (Originally from What We Did on Our Holidays)

== Personnel ==
Fairport Convention

- Simon Nicol – vocals, acoustic guitar, electric guitar
- Dave Pegg – vocals, bass guitar
- Chris Leslie – vocals, mandolin, bouzuki, violin, banjo, whistle
- Ric Sanders – violin, keyboards
- Gerry Conway – drums, percussion

Guest musician

- Edmund Whitcombe – cornet on "Red and Gold" and "Meet on the Ledge"
