= Off the Desk =

Off The Desk

Live album by Fairport Convention
- Released: 2006
- Recorded: 2004–2005
- Genre: Rock
- Length: 101:17
- Label: Matty Grooves

Fairport Convention chronology
Sense of Occasion (2007)	Off The Desk (2006)

Off The Desk is a live album by Fairport Convention. It was recorded on Fairport Convention's Winter Tours during 2004 and 2005 and the double CD features many tracks previously unavailable as live recordings.

== Track listing ==
CD1
No.	Title	Writer(s)	Length
1.	"Over the Falls"	Chris Leslie	4:21
2.	"Adieu Adieu"	Traditional, arrangement by Simon Nicol, Dave Pegg, Dave Swarbrick, Bruce Rowland	2:23
3.	"The Happy Man"	trad., arr. Leslie	2:48
4.	"Canny Capers"	Ric Sanders	5:13
5.	"Willow Creek"	Steve Tilston, Chris Parkinson	4:11
6.	"Genesis Hall"	Richard Thompson	4:09
7.	"Over the Next Hill"	Tilston	4:18
8.	"Portmeirion"	Sanders	5:24
9.	"My Love is in America"	Leslie	4:40
10.	"Western Wind"	trad., arr. Nicol, Pegg, Sanders, Leslie, Gerry Conway	4:58
11.	"Rosemary's Sister"	Huw Williams	6:20
Total length:			48:53

CD2
No.	Title	Writer(s)	Length
1.	"Some Special Place"	Sanders	3:50
2.	"I'm Already There"	Leslie	6:16
3.	"The Fossil Hunter"	Leslie	6:30
4.	"The Journeyman's Grace"	Swarbrick, Thompson	4:34
5.	"Wait for the Tide to Come In"	Ben Bennion	4:41
6.	"The Wassail Song"	trad., arr. Fairport	3:27
7.	"Morris Medley" (Laudnum Bunches/Orange in Blossom/Banks of the Dee)	trad., arr. Leslie	2:31
8.	"Close to You"	Leslie	4:07
9.	"The Hiring Fair"	Ralph McTell	7:30
10.	"Walk Awhile"	Swarbrick, Thompson	4:18
11.	"John Gaudie"	Leslie	4:33
Total length:			52:24

== Personnel ==
- Simon Nicol – vocals, guitar
- Dave Pegg – vocals, bass guitar, mandolin on "Canny Capers"
- Ric Sanders – violin, mandolin on "Morris Medley"
- Chris Leslie – vocals, bouzouki, mandolin, violin, Native American flute
- Gerry Conway – drums, percussion

special guests on "Wait for the Tide to Come In":

- PJ Wright – slide guitar
- Anna Ryder – accordion

== Release history ==
Region	Date	Label	Format	Catalog
United Kingdom	2008	Matty Grooves	double CD	MG2CD043
