= Old New Borrowed Blue =

Studio album by Fairport Convention
- Released: May 1996
- Recorded: September and October 1995 at Woodworm Studios, Barford St. Michael and The Mill Theatre, Banbury, Oxfordshire, 30 December 1995.
- Genre: Folk rock
- Length: 70:40
- Label: Woodworm
- Producer: Fairport Convention

Fairport Convention chronology
Jewel in the Crown (1995)	Old New Borrowed Blue (1996)	Who Knows Where the Time Goes? (1997)

Professional ratings
Review scores
Source	Rating
Allmusic	4/5 stars

Old New Borrowed Blue is the nineteenth studio album by folk rock band Fairport Convention, although for this release, they were billed as "Fairport Acoustic Convention" as it was the band's first all-acoustic album in 29 years. Part studio, part live, it was recorded to publicise a tour of the United States and consisted of cover versions, new songs and classic tracks dating back to the band's early career. Dave Mattacks, who had provided drums and electronic instrumentation for previous albums, was absent.

Allmusic praised the album, saying "The playing is exquisite and the vocalizing by Simon Nicol and Dave Pegg is extraordinary".

== Track listing ==
Studio tracks

1. "Woodworm Swing" (Ric Sanders) - 3:08
2. "Men" (Loudon Wainwright III) - 3:45
3. "Aunt Sally Shuffle" (Dave Pegg) - 1:22
4. "There Once Was Love" (Paul Metsers) / Innstück (Maartin Allcock) - 4:45
5. "Frozen Man" (James Taylor) - 4:20
6. "Mr Sands Is in the Building" (Maartin Allcock) - 2:06
7. "Lalla Rookh" (Words: Chris Leslie; Music: Maartin Allcock) - 4:27

Live tracks

1. "Foolish You" (Wade Hemsworth) - 3:34
2. "Crazy Man Michael" (Richard Thompson, Dave Swarbrick) - 5:09
3. "The Widow of Westmorland's Daughter" (Traditional; arrangement by Fairport Convention) - 4:05
4. "Genesis Hall" (Richard Thompson) - 4:13
5. "The Deserter" (John Richards) - 5:43
6. "The Swimming Song" (Loudon Wainwright III) - 3:24
7. "Struck It Right" (Huw Williams) - 4:26
8. "The Hiring Fair" (Ralph McTell, Dave Mattacks) - 6:07
9. "Matty Groves"/"Dirty Linen" (Traditional; arranged by Fairport Convention) - 10:06

== Personnel ==
Fairport Convention

- Simon Nicol - acoustic guitar; lead vocals (tracks 2, 4, 5, 7–16)
- Ric Sanders - violin (tracks 1, 2, 4–16)
- Dave Pegg - acoustic bass guitar (tracks 1, 4–16), mandolin (tracks 2, 3), backing vocals (tracks 4, 7, 8, 11–14)
- Maartin Allcock - acoustic guitar (tracks 1, 6, 8, 10, 13), bouzàr (tracks 2, 4, 5, 7, 9, 11, 15, 16), accordion (tracks 12, 14), mandocello (track 6), bodhran (track 6), backing vocals (tracks 4, 7, 8, 13, 14)

Additional personnel Mark Tucker - recording engineer (live) and CD mix. Mat Davies - recording engineer (studio)

== Release history ==
- 1996, May : Woodworm Records WRCD 024, UK & Australia LP
- 1996, June : Green Linnet 3114, US CD
- 1999, August : SSE Communications SSE-7301, Japan CD
- 2007 : Talking Elephant 110, US CD
