= The Flow =

Studio album by Chris Leslie
- Released: 1997
- Recorded: Woodworm Studios, Oxfordshire 1997 by Mark Tucker
- Length: 42:44
- Producer: Simon Mayor, Tim Healey

Chris Leslie chronology
| The Flow (1997) | The Gift (1999) |

Professional ratings
Review scores
| Source | Rating |
|---|---|
| Allmusic | 3/5 stars |

The Flow is an album by Chris Leslie released in 1997.

This album is mostly instrumental. Although Chris Leslie is best known for his fiddle playing in Fairport Convention, these cuts sound nothing like Fairport or any of his other prior musical projects. The album demonstrates Leslie's breadth of musicality, influence and inspiration from across the globe.

Tracks 2 and 6 produced by Simon Mayor. Other tracks produced by Tim Healey.

Recorded by Mark Tucker.

== Track listing ==
1. "Ballydesmond/ Scartaglen" (Traditional)
2. "Eliz Iza/ Derobee de Guingamp" (Traditional / Traditional)
3. "Aignish" (Traditional)
4. "The Witch of the Glen" (Traditional)
5. "Believe Me, If All Those Endearing Young Charms" (Words: Thomas Moore; Tune: Traditional)
6. "Lime Rock" (Traditional)
7. "The Old Blackbird" (Traditional)
8. "The Flow" (Chris Leslie)
9. "Niel Gow's Lament for Abercairney" (Niel Gow)
10. "Paddy Ryan's Dream/ The Inimitable Reel/ The Macroom Lassies" (Traditional)
11. "Kishmul's Galley" (Traditional)
12. "Tune for the Land of Snows" (Chris Leslie)

== Personnel ==
- Chris Leslie – violins, tingshaws, singing bowl, electric tambura
- Maartin Allcock – acoustic guitar, electric guitar
- Simon Mayor – mandola, mandocello, mandolin
- Margaret Knight – concert harp
- Anne-Marie Doyle – Irish step-dancing
- Martin Simpson – acoustic guitar
- Ric Sanders – electric violin, viola, cello
