= Myths and Heroes =

Studio album by Fairport Convention
- Released: January 2015
- Recorded: Woodworm, Oxfordshire
- Genre: British folk rock
- Length: 51:19
- Label: Matty Grooves
- Producer: John Gale, Fairport Convention

Fairport Convention chronology
By Popular Request (2012)	Myths and Heroes (2015)	50:50@50 (2017)

Myths and Heroes is a 2015 album by British folk rock band Fairport Convention, released in January 2015 on the band's own Matty Grooves Records label. The band have released over 30 albums since their debut, Fairport Convention, in 1968.

== Recording and release ==
Recording for the album began in March 2014 and concluded in November. During their winter tour at the beginning of the year, the band played some of the material destined for the album as a taster for their live audience. The album became available for pre-order on the Fairport Convention website starting on 1 January 2015 (and was also available at all shows on the band's subsequent tour) and was released officially in March, along with limited-edition vinyl copies of the album.

== Critical reception ==
Professional ratings
Aggregate scores
Source	Rating
Metacritic	66/100
Review scores
Source	Rating
The Guardian	3/5 stars
musicOMH	3/5 stars
PopMatters	7/10 stars
Record Collector	4/5 stars

John Murphy of musicOMH complimented the instrumental performances on Myth and Heroes, while Kingsley Abbott of Record Collector praised Chris Leslie's vocals on the album.

== Track listing ==
=== CD ===
1. "Myths and Heroes" (Chris Leslie)
2. "Clear Water" (Ralph McTell)
3. "The Fylde Mountain Time / Roger Bucknall's Polka" (Chris Leslie / Dave Pegg)
4. "Theodore's Song" (Chris Leslie)
5. "Love at First Sight" (Chris Leslie)
6. "John Condon" (Richard Laird / Sam Starrett / Tracey McRory)
7. "The Gallivant" (Ric Sanders)
8. "The Man in the Water" (Rob Beattie)
9. "Bring Me Back My Feathers" (Anna Ryder)
10. "Grace and Favour" (Chris Leslie)
11. "Weightless / The Gravity Reel" (James Wood / Chris Leslie)
12. "Home" (PJ Wright)
13. "Jonah's Oak" (Ric Sanders)

=== Limited edition vinyl ===
1. "Myths and Heroes" (Chris Leslie)
2. "Clear Water" (Ralph McTell)
3. "The Man in the Water" (Rob Beattie)
4. "Bring Me Back My Feathers" (Anna Ryder)
5. "Home" (PJ Wright)
6. "Love at First Sight" (Chris Leslie)
7. "John Condon" (Richard Laird, Sam Starrett, Tracey McRory)
8. "The Gallivant" (Ric Sanders)
9. "Weightless / The Gravity Reel" (James Wood / Chris Leslie)

== Personnel ==
- Simon Nicol – vocals, acoustic guitar, electric guitar
- Chris Leslie – vocals, mandolin, bouzouki, violin, banjo, celtic harp, tenor guitar, chromatic harmonica, whistle
- Ric Sanders – violin, keyboards, ukulele, bass ukulele
- Dave Pegg – vocals, bass guitar, bass ukulele, double bass, bouzouki, mandolin, tenor banjo
- Gerry Conway – drums, percussion

Guest musicians

- Matt Pegg – bass guitar on tracks 1, 4, 10 & 12
- Joe Broughton – violin on "The Gallivant"
- Paloma Trigas – violin on "The Gallivant"
- Aria Trigas – violin on "The Gallivant"
- Rob Spalton – trumpet on "The Gallivant"
- Jake Thornton – alto saxophone on "The Gallivant"
- Benjamin Hill – alto saxophone on "The Gallivant"
- Emma Jones – tenor saxophone on "The Gallivant"
