= Who Knows Where the Time Goes? (Fairport Convention album) =

Studio album by Fairport Convention
- Released: June 1997
- Recorded: 1995–1997
- Genre: British folk rock
- Label: Woodworm
- Producer: Fairport Convention, Mark Tucker

Fairport Convention chronology
Old New Borrowed Blue (1996)	Who Knows Where the Time Goes? (1997)	The Wood and the Wire (1999)

Professional ratings
Review scores
Source	Rating
Allmusic	4/5 stars

Who Knows Where the Time Goes? is the twentieth studio album released in 1997 by British folk rock band Fairport Convention. It was Fairport Convention's first album with singer, songwriter and multi-instrumentalist Chris Leslie, who replaced Maartin Allcock and would become a mainstay in the band.

The first ten tracks were recorded by Mark Tucker at Woodworm Studios, Oxfordshire. The cover of the Motown standard I Heard it Through the Grapevine was recorded live at The Cropredy Festival 1995 and featured former member Richard Thompson on lead vocal and former Wizzard frontman Roy Wood on guitar along with members of his band. The title track was a live recording of the group's 1969 standard Who Knows Where the Time Goes from the Marlowe Theatre in Canterbury in March 1997.

The cover photograph was taken at Barford St. Michael Post Office, Oxfordshire.

== Track listing ==
1. "John Gaudie" (Chris Leslie) – 5:05
2. "Sailing Boat" (Anna Ryder) – 5:25
3. "Here's to Tom Paine" (Steve Tilston) – 5:14
4. "The Bowman's Retreat" (Ric Sanders) – 3:02
5. "Spanish Main" (Martin Allcock, Chris Leslie) – 4:28
6. "The Golden Glove" (Traditional lyric; tune Sally Barker) – 6:04
7. "Slipology" (Ric Sanders) – 3:00
8. "Wishfulness Waltz" (Alan Franks)/"Moonlight On The Water" (Benny Thomasson) – 5:42
9. "Life's a Long Song" (Ian Anderson) – 2:35
10. "Dangerous" (Kristina Olsen) – 4:38
11. "I Heard It Through the Grapevine" (Norman Whitfield, Barrett Strong) – 3:50
12. "Who Knows Where the Time Goes?" (Sandy Denny) – 6:31

== Personnel ==
Fairport Convention

- Simon Nicol – guitar, vocals
- Ric Sanders – violin
- Chris Leslie – mandolin, violin, vocals, bouzouki, guitar
- Dave Pegg – bass guitar, vocals
- Dave Mattacks – drums, glockenspiel, keyboards

Additional personnel on I Heard It Through the Grapevine

- Richard Thompson – lead vocal
- Roy Wood – lead guitar
- Maartin Allcock – keyboards
- Helen Miller – trombone
- Sharron Naylor – background vocals
- John Dent – mastering
- Mark Tucker – recording, production & mixing
- Andy Price – design

== Release history ==
- 1997, June : Woodworm Records UK CD, WRCD025
- 1998, March : Folkprint, UK limited edition LP, FP 005 PLP, with slightly different track list
- 2000 : Mooncrest Records, as Wishfulness Waltz, CRESTCD 048Z / CRESTCD 048, UK reissue with alternate packaging and bonus live tracks
