= 50:50@50 =

Studio album by Fairport Convention
- Released: January 2017
- Recorded: November 2016
- Studio: Woodworm
- Genre: British folk rock
- Length: 64:17
- Label: Matty Grooves
- Producers: John Gale, Fairport Convention

Fairport Convention chronology
Myths and Heroes (2015)	50:50@50 (2017)	Shuffle and Go (2020)

Professional ratings
Aggregate scores
Source	Rating
Metacritic	72/100
Review scores
Source	Rating
Classic Rock	3.5/5 stars
The Guardian	4/5 stars
Paste	8/10
Uncut	3/5 stars

50:50@50 is the twenty-eighth studio album by British folk rock band Fairport Convention, released in January 2017 to mark the band's 50th anniversary. Half of the album was recorded in the studio, and the other half is a selection of songs recorded from live performances.

== Recording and release ==
The album features six new tracks that were recorded at Woodworm Studios in Oxfordshire in November 2016, and a re-working of "Danny Jack's Reward" (originally from the Festival Bell album) that features members of Joe Broughton's Conservatoire Folk Ensemble, which was recorded in Sound By Design's Delta Studio and The Bowman's Retreat studio in Oxfordshire. The live tracks were recorded between 2014 and 2016 at different concerts including the band's warm-up concerts for their Cropredy Festival at the Mill Arts Centre in Banbury. The album became available to buy from the band's website in January 2017, and was also available at all concerts on the band's 2017 winter tour. The album was made available everywhere else from 10 March.

== Track listing ==
1. "Eleanor's Dream" (Chris Leslie)
2. "Ye Mariners All" (Live) (Traditional; arranged by Fairport Convention)
3. "Step by Step" (Chris Leslie)
4. "The Naked Highwayman" (Live) (Steve Tilston)
5. "Danny Jack's Reward" (Ric Sanders)
6. "Jesus on the Mainline" (Live) (featuring Robert Plant) (Traditional; arranged by Fairport Convention)
7. "Devil's Work" (Chris Leslie)
8. "Mercy Bay" (Live) (Chris Leslie)
9. "Our Bus Rolls On" (Chris Leslie)
10. "Portmeirion" (Live) (Ric Sanders)
11. "The Lady of Carlisle" (featuring Jacqui McShee) (Traditional; arranged by Fairport Convention)
12. "Lord Marlborough" (Live) (Traditional; arranged by Fairport Convention)
13. "Summer by the Cherwell" (PJ Wright)
14. "John Condon" (Live) (Richard Laird / Sam Starrett / Tracey McRory)

== Personnel ==
- Simon Nicol – vocals, acoustic guitar, electric guitar
- Dave Pegg – vocals, bass guitar, double bass
- Chris Leslie – vocals, mandolin, bouzouki, violin, banjo, ukulele, chromatic harmonica, whistle
- Ric Sanders – violin, keyboards
- Gerry Conway – drums, percussion

Guest musicians

- Robert Plant – vocals and harmonica on "Jesus on the Mainline"
- Jacqui McShee – vocals on "The Lady of Carlisle"
- Joe Broughton – violin on "Danny Jack's Reward"
- Paloma Trigas – violin on "Danny Jack's Reward"
- Aria Trigas – violin on "Danny Jack's Reward"
- Natasha Davies – flute on "Danny Jack's Reward"
- Arjun Jethwa – flute on "Danny Jack's Reward"
- Rose Rutherford – clarinet on "Danny Jack's Reward"
- Rob Spalton – trumpet on "Danny Jack's Reward"
- Jake Thornton – alto and tenor saxophone on "Danny Jack's Reward"
