= In Real Time: Live '87 =

Studio album by Fairport Convention
- Released: December 1987
- Recorded: Summer 1987
- Genre: British folk rock
- Length: 40:10
- Label: Island
- Producer: Dave Mattacks

Fairport Convention chronology
Expletive Delighted! (1986)	In Real Time: Live '87 (1987)	Red & Gold (1988)

In Real Time: Live '87 is a 1987 album by British folk rock band Fairport Convention. Although appearing (especially from the cover) to consist of recordings of concert performances, the album was largely recorded at The Mill studio, Farnham, Surrey, with audience responses dubbed on later, reputedly taken from a recording of a John Martyn concert.

The "Live '87" part of the title was justified by having the songs recorded "as live" in the studio, with all the band members playing at once rather than laying down their parts individually.

== Reception ==
Professional ratings
Review scores
Source	Rating
Allmusic	2/5 stars

== Track listing ==
Side one

1. "Reynard the Fox" (Traditional) - 2.52
2. "The Widow of Westmoreland's Daughter"/"Random Jig" (Traditional/James Hill) - 4.44
3. "The Hiring Fair" (Dave Mattacks, Ralph McTell) - 6.35
4. "Crazy Man Michael" (Richard Thompson, Dave Swarbrick) - 4.49

Side two

1. "Close to the Wind" (Stuart Marson) - 6.20
2. "Big Three Medley": ("The Swirling Pit"/"Matty Groves"/"The Rutland Reel"/"Sack the Juggler") (Dave Pegg/Traditional/Ric Sanders/Ric Sanders) - 10:41
3. "Meet on the Ledge" (Richard Thompson) - 4:09

== Personnel ==
Fairport Convention

- Simon Nicol - vocals, electric & acoustic guitars
- Ric Sanders - violin; keyboard bass on "The Swirling Pit"
- Maartin Allcock - electric & acoustic guitars, bouzouki, vocals; fretless bass on "Close to the Wind"
- Dave Pegg - bass, mandolin, vocals; drums on "Close to the Wind"
- Dave Mattacks - drums; keyboards on "The Hiring Fair" and "Close to the Wind"

Production personnel

- Lee Hambling – assistant engineer
- Stuart Epps – mixing, recording
- Dave Mattacks – producer, keyboards on "Close to the Wind"
- Robin Black – mixing and recording of "Meet on the Ledge"

== Release history ==
- Island Records ILPS 9883 (LP, UK, December 1987)
- Island Records 90678-1 (LP, UK, January 1988)
- Island Records IMCD 10 (CD, UK, June 1990)
