= Ruth Gledhill =

English journalist

- Ruth Gledhill reporting for The Tablet from Westminster
- Born: 1959 (age 66–67)
- Occupation: Journalist
- Employer(s): The Times; The Tablet
- Spouse: Alan Franks
- Children: 1
- Writing career
- Genres: print and digital
- Subject: religious affairs
- Notable awards: Andrew Cross Award for Religious Writer of the Year in 2004

Ruth Gledhill (born 1959) is an English journalist and is a former religion affairs correspondent for The Times, a post she left in 2014. Gledhill was the last full-time newspaper journalist dedicated to religious affairs in the UK. She is currently assistant editor, home and digital, of The Tablet.

== Early life and career ==
Gledhill grew up in Gratwich, Staffordshire, a small village near Uttoxeter, as the daughter of the local vicar. She began her career in Uttoxeter, with the Uttoxeter Advertiser and then moved to the Birmingham Post and Birmingham Evening Mail before joining the Daily Mail in 1984 and The Times in 1987; she became The Times' religion correspondent in 1989.

Times religion correspondent Ruth Gledhill films a visit to Auschwitz in November 2008, hosted by Rabbi Barry Marcus and the Holocaust Educational Trust, of nine faith leaders headed by Chief Rabbi Sir Jonathan Sacks and Archbishop of Canterbury Dr Rowan Williams. Other faiths represented were Baháʼísm, Buddhism, Hinduism, Islam, Jainism, Sikhism and Zoroastrianism.

Gledhill has argued in favour of the "benefits of schism" within the Anglican Communion, taking a critical stance against Peter Akinola and other church leaders who have expressed conservative views on homosexuality.

Gledhill has been shortlisted three times in the British Press Awards and won the Andrew Cross Award for Religious Writer of the Year in 2004.

== Personal life ==
Gledhill, who became a Roman Catholic in 2020, is married to the writer Alan Franks. The couple, who live in Kew, have one son, Arthur.

== Publications ==
- ______(with Tim Webb) (1983) Birmingham is not a Boring City, a guide to Birmingham, 120 pp. UG Books Partnership ISBN 978-0863710384
- ______(1996) At a Service Near You, a collection of some of the best of Gledhill's articles in The Times on churches she has visited in the UK and Ireland. Hodder & Stoughton ISBN 9780340642368
- ______(as editor) The Times Book of Prayers and The Times Book of Best Sermons, published for six years in connection with The Times Preacher of the Year Award.
