= Full House (Fairport Convention album) =

1970 Fairport Convention album

Studio album by Fairport Convention
- Released: July 1970
- Recorded: February – April 1970
- Studio: Sound Techniques (London)
- Genre: British folk rock
- Length: 35:08
- Label: Island (UK); A&M (US)
- Producer: Joe Boyd

Fairport Convention chronology
Liege & Lief (1969)	Full House (1970)	Angel Delight (1971)

Full House is a 1970 album by British folk rock group Fairport Convention, their fifth since their debut, Fairport Convention in 1968, and their first without a female vocalist.

== Production ==
The album was their first without a female vocalist, as Sandy Denny had left to form Fotheringay. Founder member Ashley Hutchings had also left for Steeleye Span, and Dave Pegg had joined on bass. Richard Thompson was to leave the band for a solo career early the following year.

As their previous album, Liege & Lief, had reinterpreted a number of traditional folk tunes, so did Full House. Many were sewn into two medleys, "Dirty Linen" and "Flatback Caper". The album also featured the nine-minute track "Sloth", which remained part of the group's live set for many years and has been described as "haunting, moody, dazzling".

The original issue of Full House was intended to comprise the following tracks:

Side one
No.	Title	Length
1.	"Walk Awhile"	3:57
2.	"Doctor of Physick"	3:37
3.	"Dirty Linen"	4:17
4.	"Sloth"	9:19

Side two
No.	Title	Length
5.	"Sir Patrick Spens"	3:30
6.	"Flatback Caper"	6:24
7.	"Poor Will and the Jolly Hangman"	5:31
8.	"Flowers of the Forest"	4:04

Test pressings were made following this sequence, but before the album was officially released, Richard Thompson requested that "Poor Will and the Jolly Hangman" (written by Thompson & Swarbrick) be removed, since he was not happy with his lead vocal; this removal was done at such a late stage that the first LP sleeves had already been printed with the song shown on the track listing. A black block had to be printed over the original list with the revised track listing overprinted in gold, but a few sleeves were issued to the public without the overprinting and with the incorrect track listing. All subsequent printings had the corrected track listing despite the fact that the sleeve notes still referred to the missing track.

== Release ==
The album cover was a non-laminated gatefold sleeve featuring notes by Richard Thompson; these take the form of descriptions of spoof folk-games in which various characters participate, completed by a round-up of eventual scores. For example:

AT MAIDS MONEY: Some of the hottest dice-throwing for years. The Doctor's Druids egg stood him in good stead. Later protests by 11,000 Virgins of Cologne against cruel sports. Wandering Jew killed in brawl with Hangman, hacked in two with a ploughshare.

== Charts ==
Chart (1970)	Peak position
Australian (Kent Music Report)	16

Full House entered the British album charts on 18 July 1970, where it stayed for 11 weeks, peaking at number 13.

== Reception and legacy ==
Rolling Stone magazine's reviewer was enthusiastic, describing the album as "... an English equivalent to The Band ... they have soaked up enough of the tradition of their countryfolk that it begins to show all over, while they still maintain their roots in rock".

AllMusic described the album as "actually more viscerally exciting than its predecessor, Liege & Lief, if not quite as important as that record".

At Fairport's Cropredy Convention 2022, the album's line-up of Richard Thompson, Simon Nicol, Dave Mattacks, Dave Pegg, with Chris Leslie filling in for the late Dave Swarbrick, took to the Cropredy stage to perform the entire album. On 3 January 2023, the album was released to the public as a CD. fairportconvention.com

== Track listing ==
Side one
No.	Title	Writer(s)	Length
1.	"Walk Awhile"	Richard Thompson, Dave Swarbrick	3:57
2.	"Dirty Linen"	Traditional; arranged by Swarbrick	4:17
3.	"Sloth"	Thompson, Swarbrick	9:19

Side two
No.	Title	Writer(s)	Length
4.	"Sir Patrick Spens"	Traditional; arranged by Fairport Convention	3:30
5.	"Flatback Caper"	Ronald Cooper, Turlough O'Carolan, Traditional; arranged by Fairport Convention	6:24
6.	"Doctor of Physick"	Thompson, Swarbrick	3:37
7.	"Flowers of the Forest"	Traditional; arranged by Fairport Convention	4:04

2001 reissue

In 2001, Island Records re-issued an expanded edition of Full House that included the 8 tracks of the original intended track ordering and included four additional tracks:

- "Now Be Thankful" (the original mono mix)
- "Sir B. McKenzie's Daughter's Lament for the 77th Mounted Lancers Retreat from the Straits of Loch Knombe, in the Year of Our Lord 1727, on the Occasion of the Announcement of Her Marriage to the Laird of Kinleakie"
- "Bonny Bunch of Roses"
- "Now Be Thankful" (a new stereo mix)

"Now Be Thankful" and "Sir B. McKenzie's..." were originally released as a 1970 Island, UK single, WIP-6089. Both songs were recorded on 22 July 1970 at Sound Techniques, London.

Fairport Convention's studio recording of "Sir B. McKenzie's..." consisted of "Biff, Bang, Crash" (Trad.), "The Kilfenora" (Trad.), and "Boston Tea Party" (Dave Swarbrick)". By the time the single was issued, the band was playing the medley as "Bonny Kate" (Trad.), "The Kilfenora," "Boston Tea Party," and "Biff, Bang, Crash." Within a few years, "Sir B. McKenzie's..." consisted of the amended medley followed by "Tail Toddle" (Trad.). By the late 1970s, the medley also included the traditional tune "Up The Chimney."

The title "Sir B. McKenzie's Daughter's Lament For the 77th Mounted Lancers Retreat From The Straits of Loch Knombe, In The Year of Our Lord 1727, On The Occasion of the Announcement of Her Marriage to the Laird of Kinleakie" was the band's attempt to get into the Guinness Book of Records for the longest song title.

"Bonny Bunch of Roses", recorded one month after the Full House sessions at Gold Star Studios in Los Angeles, was finally mixed 18 years later, for the release on the Fairport Convention compilation Meet on the Ledge: The Classic Years (1967–1975), issued on A&M Records in 1999.

The stereo mix of "Now Be Thankful" (an entirely different mix from the one that appears on Richard Thompson's Watching the Dark compilation) was created by Lee Hamblin and Frank Kornelussen and previously released on Island Life, 25 Years of Island Records in 1988.

== Production ==
- Produced by Joe Boyd for Witchseason Productions, Ltd.
- Recorded at Sound Techniques, London, February – March 1970
- Vocals overdubbed at Vanguard Studios, New York City, April 1970
- Engineered by John Wood
- Sleeve notes by Richard Thompson; reissue sleeve notes by Simon Nicol
- Design (sleeve concept and design) by Superwives

== Personnel ==
- Dave Swarbrick – vocals, fiddle, viola, mandolin (on 6, 7)
- Richard Thompson – vocals, electric guitar
- Dave Pegg – vocals, bass guitar, mandolin (on 6)
- Dave Mattacks – drums, percussion, harmonium (on 2), bodhran (on 3)
- Simon Nicol – vocals, electric & acoustic guitars, bass guitar (on 6), electric dulcimer (on 8)
