= Festival Bell =

Studio album by Fairport Convention
- Released: January 2011
- Recorded: 2010
- Studios: The Bowman's Retreat, Oxfordshire
- Genre: Folk rock
- Length: 59:04
- Label: Matty Grooves
- Producers: John Gale, Fairport Convention

Fairport Convention chronology
| Sense of Occasion (2007) | Festival Bell (2011) | By Popular Request (2012) |

Festival Bell is a 2011 album by British folk rock band Fairport Convention, recorded at The Bowman's Retreat, Oxfordshire in 2010, and released in January 2011 on the band's own Matty Grooves Records label. The band have released over 30 albums since their debut, Fairport Convention, in 1968.

== Overview ==
The name of the album (as well as the cover and the title track) is a reference to the bell of the same name that currently rings in St Mary's Church in Cropredy, Oxfordshire. The track "Ukulele Central" features guest appearances from comedian Frank Skinner and singer Joe Brown. The song "Mercy Bay" tells of the ill-fated voyage of HMS Investigator to search for Franklin's lost expedition, itself searching for the Northwest Passage.

== Release and critical reception ==
Professional ratings
Review scores
| Source | Rating |
|---|---|
| BBC | (favorable) |
| The Guardian | (favorable) |
| musicOMH | 4/5 stars |
| Record Collector | 4/5 stars |

The album was released four years after the band's previous studio work, Sense of Occasion. It consists of 14 tracks, mixing original compositions with four cover versions including a reworking of the title track from the band's 1975 album Rising for the Moon. Record Collector's 4-star review of the album stated: "Festival Bell is a work of maturity and depth, yet delivered with a lightness of touch that will delight fans old and new".

== Track listing ==
1. "Mercy Bay" (Chris Leslie)
2. "Rui's Guitar" (Chris Leslie)
3. "Danny Jack's Chase" (Ric Sanders)
4. "Reunion Hill" (Richard Shindell)
5. "Wouldn't Say No" (Chris Leslie)
6. "Around the Wild Cape Horn" (Ralph McTell)
7. "Celtic Moon" (Mark Evans, Carolyn Evans)
8. "Ukulele Central" (Chris Leslie, Ric Sanders)
9. "Albert and Ted" (Ric Sanders, Dave Pegg)
10. "Darkside Wood" (Chris While)
11. "London Apprentice" / "Johnny Ginears" (Ralph McTell / Ric Sanders)
12. "Rising for the Moon" (Sandy Denny)
13. "Danny Jack's Reward" (Ric Sanders)
14. "The Festival Bell" (Chris Leslie)

== Personnel ==
- Simon Nicol - vocals, acoustic guitar, electric guitar, bass ukulele
- Chris Leslie - vocals, mandolin, bouzuki, violin, Portuguese guitar, ukulele, whistle
- Ric Sanders - violin, ukulele, keyboards, bass ukulele, backing vocals,
- Dave Pegg - bass guitar, vocals, ukulele, mandolin, acoustic guitar
- Gerry Conway - drums, percussion

Guest musicians

- Frank Skinner - banjo ukulele on "Ukulele Central"
- Joe Brown - ukulele, backing vocals on "Ukulele Central"
