= Barry Marcus =

South African rabbi

Rabbi Barry Marcus MBE

Personal life
- Born: Barry Marcus; 28 October 1949 (age 76) Cape Town, South Africa
- Occupation: Holocaust educator, former Rabbi of Central London Synagogue

Religious life
- Religion: Judaism

Jewish leader
- Synagogue: Central Synagogue, Great Portland Street
- Yeshiva: Semikhah (ordination) from Beth Midrash l'Rabbanim, Johannesburg, South Africa
- Residence: London, United Kingdom

Rabbi Barry Marcus MBE (born 28 October 1949) is a South African rabbi. He retired as senior minister of Central Synagogue, Great Portland Street in London in 2018 after serving the congregation for over 23 years. He is notable for his rabbinical and pastoral duties in the UK, Israel and South Africa.

In 2015 he was appointed MBE in the New Year Honours for services to Holocaust education.

== Background ==
Marcus was born in Cape Town, South Africa on 28 October 1949 and raised in Vredehoek, a residential suburb at the foot of Table Mountain and Devil's Peak. He attended Herzlia School, a local Jewish school. He served Woodstock Shul where his grandfather, Rabbi Shlomo Dovid Grawitzky had also served as Rabbi from 1929 to 1944. He then moved to Rondebosch shul and Camps Bay Shul. He was drafted into the South African Defence Force in 1968 as part of the compulsory military service for white South African men under apartheid. Afterwards he was awarded a scholarship at Bar-Ilan University in Israel where he spent four years. He returned to Cape Town to teach Hebrew at Herzlia School and Arthur's Road Shul in Sea Point. In 1975 he accepted an invitation from South Africa's Chief Rabbi Bernard Casper to be his assistant and youth rabbi in Johannesburg. He also began lecturing in Hebrew at Wits University in the city. In 1981 vandals sprayed an antisemitic Nazi slogan on the wall of his home in Waverley. He served as Rabbi to Waverley Hebrew Congregation, one of the largest Jewish communities in Johannesburg. Before becoming the Rabbi of the Central Synagogue he served as a rabbi in Israel.

== Controversy ==
In 2015 Rabbi Marcus spoke out in defence of the fashion designer John Galliano, who was found guilty of racism and antisemitic abuse in 2011.

Following a National Crime Agency investigation beginning in October 2022 into money from the charities Dalaid and the Schwarzschild Foundation being held in Marcus' personal bank accounts, Marcus agreed in January 2024 to return £2.35 million to the two organisations.

== Holocaust education ==
Times religion correspondent Ruth Gledhill films a visit to Auschwitz in November 2008, hosted by Rabbi Barry Marcus and the Holocaust Educational Trust, of nine faith leaders headed by Chief Rabbi Sir Jonathan Sacks and Archbishop of Canterbury Dr Rowan Williams. Other faiths represented were Baháʼísm, Buddhism, Hinduism, Islam, Jainism, Sikhism and Zoroastrianism.

Since November 2008 Rabbi Marcus has been organising educational trips to Auschwitz together with the Holocaust Educational Trust.

== Awards and notable appointments ==
In 2014, Rabbi Marcus was awarded the Knight's Cross of the Order of Merit of the Republic of Poland for Holocaust education and for fostering dialogue and building bridges with Poland. He is a member of the advisory board for the Lithuanian Jewish Heritage Project.

== See also ==
- Holocaust education
- Orthodox Judaism
