= Alan Franks =

British journalist, novelist and playwright

- Occupations: Journalist, playwright, novelist and musician
- Employer: The Times
- Known for: The Mother Tongue; The Notes of Doctor Newgate; Wishfulness Waltz
- Notable work: The Mother Tongue; The Notes of Doctor Newgate; The Adventures of Wendy Howard-Watt
- Spouse: Ruth Gledhill
- Children: 4

Alan Franks is a British journalist, playwright, novelist and musician, who writes for The Times and The Guardian. He is also a theatre reviewer.

His black comedy, The Mother Tongue, whose cast included Prunella Scales, ran at the Greenwich Theatre, London in 1992. In 2005 the Orange Tree Theatre in Richmond, London ran his play Previous Convictions. His play Augusta was performed at the New End Theatre, Hampstead, London in 2008. His one-man play Looking at Lucian, performed by Henry Goodman as the artist Lucian Freud, ran at the Ustinov Studio, Bath, Somerset, in 2017.

Franks' 2013 novel, The Notes of Doctor Newgate, is written in the form of a private diary. Reviewing the book for The Guardian, Nicholas Lezard wrote that, despite the restrictions imposed by this narrative format, "Franks cleverly gets us to see Newgate from other perspectives... he can make you laugh out loud... He also achieves the considerable feat of making you nearly weep at a tender piece of poetry Newgate's father, a former miner, has written".

Franks composed Wishfulness Waltz, which was recorded by Fairport Convention on their 1997 album Who Knows Where the Time Goes? and was also on Jackie Oates' 2008 album The Violet Hour. For more than two decades he performed and recorded with Patty Vetta, who previously sang with The Settlers.

Franks and his wife, the journalist Ruth Gledhill, live in Kew, London and have one son, Arthur. Franks has three other children from a previous marriage.

== Albums ==
- (with Patty Vetta) Only Natural (2011), self-released
- (with Patty Vetta) The Arms of the Enemy (2002), self-released
- (with Patty Vetta) Bird in Flames (2000), self-released
- (with Patty Vetta) Ladders of Daylight (1997), The Road Goes On Forever – RGF/VFCD 038
- (with Patty Vetta) Will (1995), The Road Goes On Forever – RGFCD 023

== Novels ==
- The Thickness of the Door: Three Stories of the North and the South (three novellas: 2018), i2i Publishing, 280 pp. ISBN 978-1999662387
- The Adventures of Wendy Howard-Watt (2015), Muswell Press. ISBN 978-0992817176
- The Notes of Doctor Newgate (2013), Muswell Press, 295 pp. ISBN 978-0957213647
- Sins of the Sons (2010), Muswell Press, 373 pp. ISBN 978-0956557544
- Boychester's Bugle (1982), William Heinemann, 186 pp. ISBN 978-0954795986

== Playscripts ==
- A World Elsewhere (2014), Muswell Press, 112 pp. ISBN 978-0957556874
- The Mother Tongue (1993), Samuel French, 83 pp. ISBN 978-0573018367

== Poems ==
- Unmade Roads (2010), Muswell Press, 97 pp. ISBN 978-0954795986
