= Shuffle and Go =

Studio album by Fairport Convention
- Released: January 2020
- Recorded: October 2019
- Studios: Woodworm Studios, Barford St. Michael, Oxfordshire
- Genre: British folk rock
- Length: 52:38
- Label: Matty Grooves
- Producers: John Gale; Fairport Convention

Fairport Convention chronology
50:50@50 (2017)	Shuffle and Go (2020)

Shuffle and Go is the twenty-ninth studio album by British folk rock band Fairport Convention, released in January 2020. It was their last to feature drummer Gerry Conway who left the group in 2022.

== Recording and release ==
Recording for the album took place at Woodworm Studios in October 2019. The album was released via the band's website in time for their winter tour which began in January 2020, where the album was available to buy from the merchandise table at every show. The album then got an official release on 28 February 2020 from all other retailers and platforms.

== Critical reception ==
John Barlass of At The Barrier called Shuffle and Go "a most enjoyable piece of work" and David Kidman of Folk Radio also gave the album praise, calling it "another solid, and solidly desirable, entry in the Fairport canon."

== Track listing ==
1. "Don't Reveal My Name" (Chris Leslie) – 3:59
2. "Cider Rain" (James Wood, Luc Boisseau, Philippe Richalley) – 3:43
3. "Good Time for a Fiddle and Bow / The Christmas Eve Reel" (Leslie, Tommy Coen) – 4:20
4. "A Thousand Bars" (Rob Beattie) – 5:29
5. "Shuffle and Go" (Leslie) – 3:14
6. "Moses Waits" (Beattie) – 4:20
7. "Steampunkery" (Ric Sanders) – 3:42
8. "Linseed Memories" (James Wood) – 3:30
9. "The Year of Fifty Nine" (Leslie) – 3:24
10. "The Byfield Steeplechase" (PJ Wright) – 3:51
11. "Moondust and Solitude" (Leslie) – 5:30
12. "Jolly Springtime" (James Taylor) – 2:00
13. "Precious Time" (Sanders) – 5:29

== Personnel ==
- Simon Nicol – vocals, acoustic guitar, electric guitar
- Dave Pegg – vocals, bass guitar, ukulele, bass ukulele, mandolin
- Chris Leslie – vocals, mandolin, violin, acoustic guitar, harmonica, bouzouki, whistle, kalimba, Celtic harp, ukulele
- Ric Sanders – violin, keyboards, ukulele, bass ukulele
- Gerry Conway – drums, percussion

== Charts ==
Chart performance for Shuffle and Go
Chart (2020)	Peak position
UK Folk Albums (Official Charts)	26
UK Independent Albums (Official Charts)	37
UK Progressive Albums (Official Charts)	11

== See also ==
- List of 2020 albums
