= Jewel in the Crown (album) =

Jewel In The Crown

Studio album by Fairport Convention
- Released: January 9, 1995
- Recorded: October 4 – November 1, 1994
- Studio: Woodworm Studios, Oxfordshire
- Genre: British folk rock
- Length: 60:36
- Label: Woodworm
- Producer: Fairport Convention, Mark Tucker, Gus Dudgeon

Fairport Convention chronology
The Five Seasons (1990)	Jewel In The Crown (1995)	Old New Borrowed Blue (1996)

Professional ratings
Review scores
Source	Rating
Allmusic	3/5 stars

Jewel In The Crown is a 1995 album by British folk rock band Fairport Convention. It is the usual mix of traditional and self-composed songs, and covers of some of the band's favourite writers including Huw Williams, Ralph McTell and Julie Matthews. It is the eighteenth studio album since their debut, Fairport Convention, in 1968.

== History ==
The album was recorded in two stages. Initially a few tracks were partially recorded with recording engineer Tim Matyear. Matyear's departure from Dave Pegg's Woodworm Studio led to producer-engineer Mark Tucker being hired to continue with recording the remaining material. At a very late stage in the production, producer Gus Dudgeon made a contribution to the mixing of the songs "Jewel In The Crown", "The Naked Highwayman", "Closing Time" and "Red Tide". Some subtractive edits were made to "The Naked Highwayman" as Dudgeon felt the song was too long. Overall it is generally considered one of the most satisfying of Fairport's releases since Nine. It was also the last studio album recorded by the Nicol, Pegg, Mattacks, Allcock and Sanders line-up.

== Track listing ==
1. "Jewel in the Crown" (Julie Matthews) – 3:32
2. "Slip Jigs and Reels" (Steve Tilston) – 4:52
3. "A Surfeit of Lampreys" (Maartin Allcock) – 3:19
4. "Kind Fortune" (Traditional; arranged by Fairport Convention) – 2:37
5. "Diamonds and Gold" (Ben Bennion, Maartin Allcock) – 4:14
6. "The Naked Highwayman" (Steve Tilston) – 4:32
7. "The Islands" (Ralph McTell, Maartin Allcock) – 4:33
8. "The Youngest Daughter" (Traditional; arranged by Maartin Allcock) – 2:06
9. "London Danny" (Jez Lowe) – 3:50
10. "Summer in December" (Ric Sanders) – 4:57
11. "Travelling by Steam" (Huw Williams) / "Travel by Steam" (Traditional, arranged by Ric Sanders) – 3:47
12. "She's Like the Swallow" (Traditional; arranged by Maartin Allcock) – 3:14
13. "Red Tide" (Rob Beattie) – 4:36
14. "Home Is Where the Heart Is" (Clive Gregson) – 4:41
15. "Closing Time" (Leonard Cohen) – 5:40

== Production ==
- Produced by Fairport Convention at the band's Woodworm Studios
- Mixed and engineered by Mark Tucker and Fairport, with contributions from Gus Dudgeon
- "Jewel In The Crown", "Diamonds And Gold", "The Naked Highwayman", "The Islands", "Red Tide" and "Closing Time" were mixed by Gus Dudgeon and Mark Tucker.

== Personnel ==
Fairport Convention

- Simon Nicol – lead vocal, acoustic guitar and 12-string guitar
- Maartin Allcock – electric and acoustic guitar, keys, bouzar, bodhran, accordion, triangle, backing vocals
- Ric Sanders – violins
- Dave Pegg – bass guitar, acoustic bass, electric guitar, mandolin, backing vocals
- Dave Mattacks – drums, percussion
