= Margaret Rizza =

English composer (1929–2026)

Margaret Rizza (née Lensky; 19 August 1929 – 9 September 2026) was an English composer, primarily of church music. She taught singing at the Guildhall School of Music and Drama from 1977 to 1994.

== Life and career ==
Margaret Rizza was born on 19 August 1929 into a musical family, where her mother played piano and her father was the organist for his local parish church. She attended the Royal College of Music from age 17 to study piano, at which she admitted she was not particularly proficient. However, she soon switched to studying singing, and completed her training first at the National School of Opera in London and then at Siena and Rome in Italy, after which she pursued a career as an opera singer, using the name Margaret Lensky, for 25 years. During this time she sang at many of the leading venues for opera, working with conductors including Leonard Bernstein, Benjamin Britten and Igor Stravinsky. She married George Rizza, who emigrated from Italy to Scotland with his family aged 11, and who managed Chester Music (later Novello) for nearly 40 years. They had one son and one daughter.

From 1977 to 1994, she taught singing at the Guildhall School of Music and Drama. From 1986 onwards, she was increasingly involved in projects to bring music to the community and in aspects of spirituality. The community work involved taking groups of student musicians into prisons, hospitals, hospices, inner city schools, centres for sufferers from Multiple Sclerosis, schools for the blind, and working with people with physical and learning difficulties. She also worked with the World Community for Christian Meditation, leading retreats, workshops on vocal and choral skills, and days of prayer and music. Until 2008, she also conducted vocal workshops and masterclasses at the Dartington International Summer School. She turned to composing music relatively late in life, when Sister Pamela Hayes, who was a good friend, asked her to write some music which would form an introduction to prayer at an international conference. Despite an initial reluctance, she produced six pieces of music for the conference, and in 1997 released them on a CD. She composed mostly church music and began training and directing choral groups and choirs from 1989. By 2013, she had been involved in the production of ten CDs of choral music, acting principally as conductor.

As well as her work in Britain, she conducted conferences and seminars featuring her music in Ireland, Malaysia, New Zealand, Singapore, and the United States. BBC Radio Kent gave her an award in 2003 for the best interview on prayer and music, and in 2004 she received an Andrew Cross Award for religious journalism. In 2007, the English conductor Harry Christophers commissioned her to write a choral work for The Sixteen, a choir and period instrument orchestra. This led to her developing a new style of writing, which she called "classical contemporary", and the composition entitled Ave Generosa was released on CD, sung by The Sixteen and conducted by Christophers. It premiered at the Queen Elizabeth Hall on London's South Bank in 2008, and in the United States in 2009.

Rizza died on 9 September 2026, aged 97.

== Works, editions and recordings ==
- Ave generosa
- Choral Works (Mysterium amoris) Gaudete Ensemble, Eamonn Dougan. Naxos
