= The Five Seasons =

Studio album by Fairport Convention
- Released: December 1990
- Recorded: April – August 1990
- Studio: Woodworm Studios, Barford St. Michael, Oxfordshire
- Genre: British folk rock
- Label: New Routes
- Producer: Dave Mattacks, Simon Nicol

Fairport Convention chronology
Red & Gold (1988)	The Five Seasons (1990)	Jewel in the Crown (1995)

Professional ratings
Review scores
Source	Rating
Allmusic	3/5 stars

The Five Seasons is the seventeenth studio album by British folk rock band Fairport Convention.

== Track listing ==
Side one

1. "Claudy Banks" (Traditional) - 5:53
2. "Cup of Tea!"/"A Loaf of Bread"/"Miss Monahan's" (Allcock, Traditional) - 3:16
3. "All Your Beauty" (Barry Lowe, Martin White) - 2:55
4. "Sock In It" (Dave Whetstone) - 5:29
5. "Gold" (Peter Blegvad) - 5:06

Side two

1. "Ginnie" (Huw Williams) - 4:10
2. "Mock Morris '90" (The Green Man/The Cropredy Badger/Molly On The Jetty) (Ric Sanders) - 4:53
3. "The Card Song"/"Shuffle the Pack" (Allcock, Mattacks, Nicol) - 4:26
4. "The Wounded Whale" (Archie Fisher, Traditional) - 6:43

Bonus Track on CD release

1. "Rhythm of the Time" (Dave Whetstone) - 5:52

== Release history ==
- 1990, December: UK LP, New Routes RUE 005
- 1990, December : UK CD, New Routes RUE CD 005
- 1990, December : US CD, Rough Trade NR 005-2
- 1991, December : UK CD, Woodworm Records WRCD 019
- 1995, December : UK CD, HTD Records HTD CD 48

== Personnel ==
Fairport Convention

- Maartin Allcock - guitars, bouzouki, mandolin, accordion, keyboards, vocals
- Ric Sanders - violin
- Dave Pegg - acoustic & bass guitars, vocals
- Dave Mattacks - drums, percussion, keyboards, harpsichord
- Simon Nicol - guitars, vocals, dobro

Technical

- Tim Matyear - engineer
- Barry Hammond with Simon Nicol and Dave Mattacks - mixing
