= The House Band =

The House Band was a musical group formed in Edinburgh in 1984 by musicians Ged Foley (vocals, guitar), Jimmy Young (smallpipes, flute, whistle), Iain Macleod (guitar, mandolin) and Chris Parkinson (melodeon, keyboards, piano accordion and harmonica). They played original compositions and traditional music in a Celtic/British folk style, with influences from reggae, country, pop, jazz and world music. Successive regroupings of the band released nine albums over seventeen years, touring in United Kingdom, Europe, Africa, Australia, New Zealand and the United States, before finally disbanding in 2001.

== History ==
The band's first performance took place in October 1984, at a school in Dalkeith. Its first contract was with Topic Records in London and the first album, The House Band, was recorded in January 1985.

In 1985, The House Band performed in Italy, and then Germany and Switzerland in October and November. A tour of New Zealand took place from December 1985 until mid-February 1986, after which the original group disbanded.

On returning to the UK, Chris Parkinson and Ged Foley formed a new group with John Skelton and Brian Brooks, later billing themselves as The New House Band. In 1987, they recorded a second album, Pacific, for Topic Records.

Brian Brooks had lived in New York City for a while, so had some contacts which led to several gigs there in 1987. Ged Foley's prior association with Battlefield Band led to tours of the US after this — both Battlefield Band and The House Band worked with the same agency. These successful tours continued until the end of the 1990s. Brooks left the band in 1988, after which the three remaining members recorded Word of Mouth at Topic Records' studios.

During this period, the band also toured in Uganda, Tanzania and Kenya, with a stay in Zanzibar for a few days. The name for the band's next album, Stonetown, was inspired by the name of the old part of Zanzibar City, the capital of the island of Zanzibar. Immediately after a tour of the Netherlands and Belgium, the whole album was recorded in eight days in 1991, for Harbourtown Records. The photo for the sleeve of Stonetown was taken in Whitby, where Chris Parkinson was living at the time and is, coincidentally, the same street where Simply Red had filmed part of the video for their song "Holding Back the Years". The album won a Music Retailers Association Annual Award for Excellence (in the 'Folk and Country Music' category) in 1992.

Following this, the band signed with Green Linnet Records, and in 1993 released a compilation of previous works entitled Groundwork. Roger Wilson joined the band on fiddle, guitar and vocals, and the album, Another Setting, followed in 1994. Bernie Nau (piano) and Mark Hellenberg (percussion) worked with the band as session musicians during the recording of this album.

The next album was Rockall in 1996, which was also recorded in Vermont.

After that, October Song was recorded at Studio du Chemin 4, Joliette, Quebec, in December 1997. The studio was owned by Denis Frechette, a pianist with La Bottine Souriante, and the recording engineer was André Marchand (ex-member of La Bottine Souriante) who added some 'foot percussion' on one of the tracks. October Song was released in time for a tour of Australia and New Zealand in early 1998, followed by tours of the UK, Europe and the US. Roger Wilson left the band after these tours, at the end of 1998.

In April 2000, The New House Band was relaunched with a recording of a four-track demo in Ohio. A short tour of the US was arranged for December 2000, and a tour of the UK from May until June 2001. The UK tour also included gigs in Belgium and Denmark. A final album, The Very Best of The House Band, was released in 2001, after which the group disbanded.

== Discography ==
- The House Band (1985)
- Pacific (1987)
- Word of Mouth (1988)
- Stonetown (1991)
- Groundwork (compilation) (1993)
- Another Setting (1994)
- Rockall (1996)
- October Song (1998)
- The Very Best of The House Band (compilation) (2001)

In 2009, "The Happy One-Step/Green Willis" from Word of Mouth, was included in Topic Records 70 year anniversary boxed set, Three Score and Ten, as track six on the seventh CD.
