= Roger Wilson (folk musician) =

- Born: 22 July 1961 (age 64); Leicester, England
- Genres: Folk
- Occupations: Musician, songwriter, record producer, graphic designer
- Instruments: Vocals, violin, viola, guitar
- Years active: 1986–present
- Labels: Ruf Records, Green Linnet, Harbourtown Records, Whiff Records
- Formerly of: The House Band

Roger Wilson (born 22 July 1961, Leicester, England) is an English folk singer, fiddler, violist, guitarist, and songwriter who abandoned a graphic design career to become a full-time musician in 1984. He is recognized as a fiddle-singing pioneer. He was a member of The House Band (1993–98) and later joined Chris Wood and Martin Carthy in performances. He has also worked with Kate Rusby's Concert Party, with Pete Morton in Urban Folk, and with John Tams at the National Theatre.

== Compositions ==
Wilson's songs include "Indian Tea", "Payday" "Pride and Prejudice", "Sick of the Working Life," "The Banks of Red Roses", "The Cotton Reel", "The Gumble Waltz" "The Luckiest Man", "The Peg in the Hole", "Ultrasound", "Where My Feet are Going I Don't Know", and "Zakynthos Jig"

== Discography ==
- The Palm of Your Hand, Harbourtown Records HAR 002 (Vinyl), HARCD 020 (1988)
- Urban Folk Volume One (Various artists), Harbourtown Records (1991)
- Stark Naked, Whiff Records WH001CD (1994)
- Another Setting (The House Band), Green Linnet Records GLCD 1143 (1994)
- Rockall (The House Band), Green Linnet GLCD 1174 (1996)
- Urban Folk Volume Two: Self Destructive Fools, Harbourtown Records (1997)
- Urban Folk Volumes 1+2, Harbourtown Records HARCD032 (1997)
- Wood, Wilson, Carthy – Ruf Records RUFCD05 (1998)
- October Song (The House Band), Green Linnet GLCD 1190 (1998)
- You Look Familiar (2007)
