= Now Be Thankful =

Single by Fairport Convention
- B-side: "Sir B. McKenzie's Daughter's Lament for the 77th Mounted Lancers Retreat from the Straits of Loch Knombe, in the Year of Our Lord 1727, on the Occasion of the Announcement of Her Marriage to the Laird of Kinleakie"
- Released: October 1970
- Recorded: 22 July 1970
- Studio: Sound Techniques, Chelsea, London
- Length: 2:24
- Label: Island: WIP 6089
- Songwriter(s): Dave Swarbrick / Richard Thompson
- Producer(s): Joe Boyd, Witchseason Productions

Fairport Convention singles chronology
""If (Stomp)""	"Now Be Thankful"	""Walk Awhile""

Official Audio
- "Now Be Thankful" (Stereo Mix) on YouTube

"Now Be Thankful" is a 1970 single by Fairport Convention released by Island Records (WIP 6089, September 1970). The lyrics are by Dave Swarbrick and Richard Thompson.

Though apparently cheerful on the surface, the lyrics can also be taken as referring to the barbarity of life in medieval times.

== B-side ==
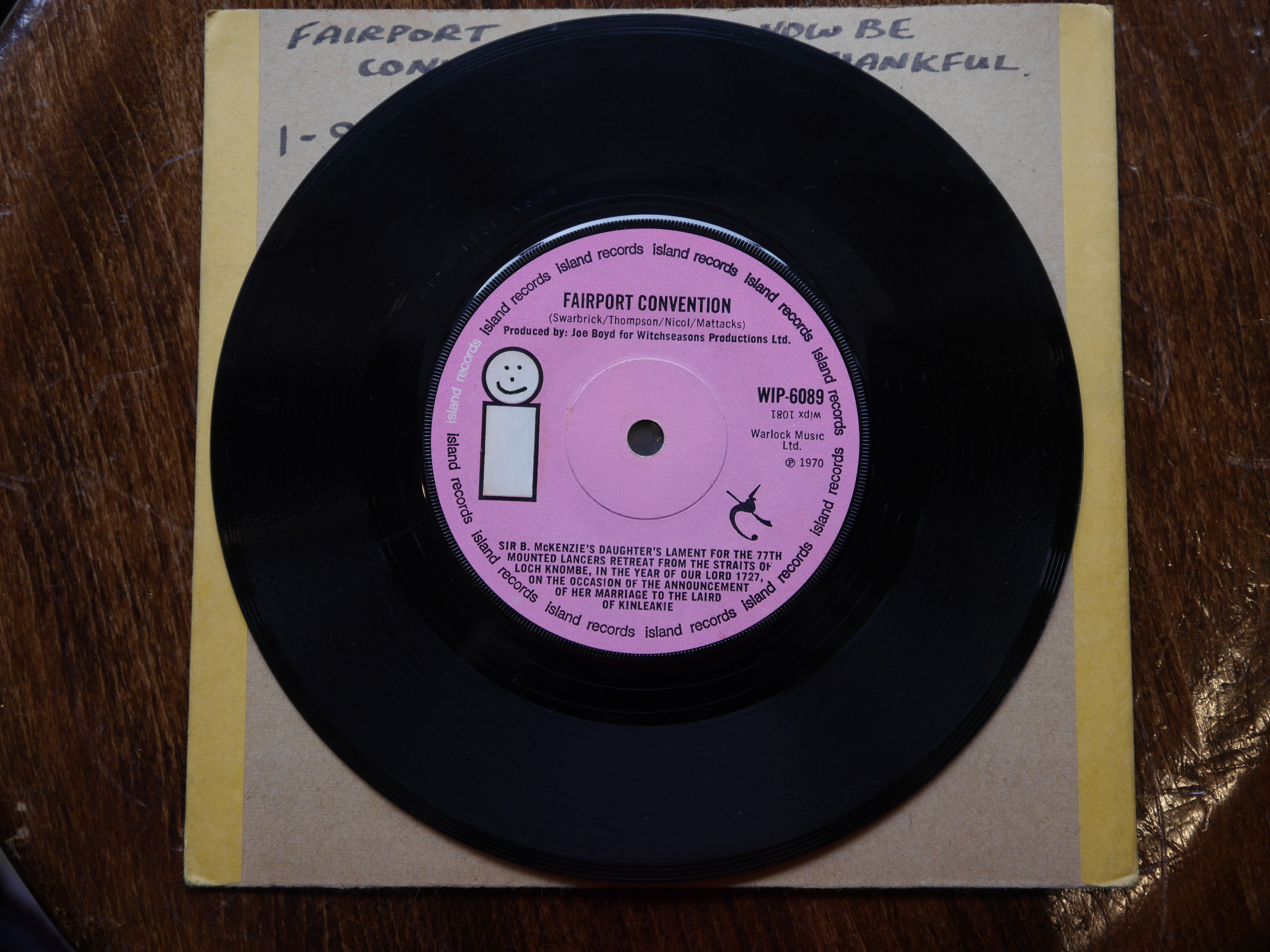
The B-side on an original 45 rpm single

The B-side "Sir B. McKenzie's Daughter's Lament For The 77th Mounted Lancers Retreat From The Straits Of Loch Knombe, In The Year Of Our Lord 1727, On The Occasion Of The Announcement Of Her Marriage To The Laird Of Kinleakie" is actually a medley of three tunes: "Da Scalloway Lasses" (Trad.), "The Kilfenora" (Trad.) and "Boston Tea Party" (by Dave Swarbrick).

The title referred to the strip cartoon Barry McKenzie, written by Barry Humphries, which Fairport Convention enjoyed in the satirical magazine Private Eye. The song's title was an attempt to get into the Guinness Book of World Records. Frequently cited to be the longest track title ever, it was later beaten by Test Dept's "Long Live British Democracy Which Flourishes and Is Constantly Perfected Under the Immaculate Guidance of the Great, Honourable, Generous and Correct Margaret Hilda Thatcher. She Is the Blue Sky in the Hearts of All Nations. Our People Pay Homage and Bow in Deep Respect and Gratitude to Her. The Milk of Human Kindness".

== Availability ==
Both sides of the single were included on the 2001 reissue of Fairport Convention's 1970 album Full House, along with a new stereo mix of "Now Be Thankful".
