= Red & Gold =

1988 album by Fairport Convention

Studio album by Fairport Convention
- Released: December 1988
- Recorded: September – November 1988
- Studios: Woodworm Studios, Barford St. Michael, Oxfordshire
- Genre: British folk rock
- Length: 40:32
- Label: Rough Trade
- Producer: Simon Nicol

Fairport Convention chronology
In Real Time: Live '87 (1987)	Red & Gold (1988)	The Five Seasons (1990)

Red & Gold is a 1988 album by British folk rock band Fairport Convention, their sixteenth studio album since their debut in 1968. The album was released on the Rough Trade label.

The title track was written by Ralph McTell, and tells the story of the Battle of Cropredy Bridge, which occurred in 1644 during the English Civil War. The location has strong links with Fairport Convention, being the venue of their annual music festival; the story is told from the perspective of a farm worker, Will Timms, who describes "red and gold" as "royal colours", while the red itself represents the spilled blood of combatants and the gold the wheat fields in which the battle took place.

== Reception ==
Professional ratings
Review scores
Source	Rating
Allmusic	3/5 stars
Rolling Stone	4/5 stars

The album entered the UK album chart on 28 January 1989, spending one week at No. 74.

David Fricke, Rolling Stone's reviewer, commented on the release being on Rough Trade Records: "Britain's oldest surviving folk-rock band allied to the archetypal indie punk record label! Even for Fairport Convention, which has defied time, tide and trauma in its pursuit of the electric folk dream, that's pushing it."

== Track listing ==
1. "Set Me Up" (Dave Whetstone) – 4:23
2. "The Noise Club" (Maartin Allcock) – 3:12
3. "Red and Gold" (Ralph McTell) – 6:44
4. "The Beggar's Song" (Traditional; arranged by Maartin Allcock) – 3:33
5. "The Battle" (Ric Sanders) – 1:09
6. "Dark Eyed Molly" (Archie Fisher) – 4:34
7. "The Rose Hip" (Sanders) – 4:24
8. "London River" (Rod Shearman) – 2:59
9. "Summer Before the War" (Huw Williams) – 4:33
10. "Open the Door Richard" (Bob Dylan) – 4:57

Bonus track on 1995 rerelease

1. "Close to the Wind" (live) (Marson) – 6:09

== Release history ==
- 1988, December : New Routes RUE 002 UK LP
- 1989, January : New Routes RUE CD 002 UK CD
- 1989 : Rough Trade ROUGH US 63 US LP & CD
- 1989 : Accord 104481 France LP & cassette/104482 CD
- 1989 : Possum VPL 1–6812 Australia LP & Cassette
- 1991, December : Woodworm Records WRC 018 UK Cassette & CD
- 1995, November : HTD Records HTD CD 47 UK CD
- 1996 : Scana STAR 2002-2 Sweden, CD
- 2000, January : Transatlantic TRACD 333 UK CD (Export Only)
- 2001, June : Talking Elephant TECD 014
- 2002, July : Castle Music America 06076 81177-2 US CD

== Personnel ==
Fairport Convention

- Maartin Allcock – guitars, bouzouki, mandolin, accordion, keyboards, vocals
- Ric Sanders – violin
- Dave Pegg – acoustic & bass guitars, vocals
- Dave Mattacks – drums, percussion, keyboards, harpsichord
- Simon Nicol – guitars, vocals, dobro

Additional personnel

- Tim Matyear – engineer
- Rob Braviner & Mark Tucker – engineering
- John Dent – mastering
- Mike Dolan – mixing
- David Gleeson & Spencer Richards – artwork
- Malcolm Holmes – booklet design
- Dawn Robertson & John Woodward – cover photography
