= Chris Parkinson (musician) =

British folk musician (born 1950)

Chris Parkinson (born 31 March 1950) is a British folk musician. He was a co-founder of the British folk band The House Band (1984-2001), playing accordion, harmonica, melodeon and keyboards. He has also performed with John Kirkpatrick in the accordion duo, 'The Sultans of Squeeze', who were included in nominations as 'duo of the year' in the 2006 BBC Radio 2 Folk Awards

== Career ==
Chris Parkinson has played music since the age of five, starting with the harmonica. Other instruments include the piano, guitar, concertina, tin whistle, melodeon, piano accordion, keyboard and fiddle.

He has worked with Ralph McTell, Steve Phillips and Billy Connolly

Parkinson's tune Mr Isaac's Maggot appears on the accordion box set Planet Squeezebox.

== Discography ==
Solo work

- Parky - CPCD313
- Out of his Tree - Pan Records PAN147

With The House Band

- The House Band - Topic 12TS439
- Pacific - Topic 12TS445
- Groundwork - Green Linnet 1132
- Word of Mouth - Topic 12TS451 - Green Linnet 3045
- Stonetown - Harbourtown HAR019 - Green Linnet 3060
- Rockall - Green Linnet 1174
- Another Setting - Green Linnet 1143
- October Song - Green Linnet 1190

With John Kirkpatrick

- The Sultans of Squeeze - Fledg'ling Records 3056

With Alistair Russell

- Paddy Goes To Huddersfield – Celtic Music From Yorkshire - Glade GLDCD0201

With Steve Phillips

- Been A Long Time Gone - Clarion Records CL CD001

With Steve Phillips & The Rough Diamonds

- Everyone A Gem - Good 'Ol Boy Music GOB:00:003
- Live At The Grosvenor - Clarion Records CLCD003
- North Country Blues - Clarion Records CLCD004
