= What We Did on Our Holidays =

Studio album by Fairport Convention
- Released: 13 December 1968
- Genres: Folk rock, folk
- Length: 38:07
- Label: Island
- Producer: Joe Boyd

Fairport Convention chronology
Fairport Convention (1968)	What We Did on Our Holidays (1968)	Unhalfbricking (1969)

Singles from "What We Did on Our Holidays"
- 1. "Meet on the Ledge" b/w "Throwaway Street Puzzle" Released: December 1968; 2. "I'll Keep It with Mine" b/w "Fotheringay" Released: 1969 (US)

Alternative cover
- US release by A&M Records

What We Did on Our Holidays (released as Fairport Convention in the United States) is the second studio album by the English folk rock band Fairport Convention. It was released on 13 December 1968 through Island Records. It was their first album to feature singer-songwriter Sandy Denny. The album also showed a move towards the folk rock for which the band became noted, including tracks later to become perennial favourites such as "Fotheringay" and the song traditionally used to close live concerts, "Meet on the Ledge".

== History ==
Following the departure of Judy Dyble, the band conducted auditions for a replacement singer, and Sandy Denny became the obvious choice. Simon Nicol has said "it was a one horse race really... she stood out like a clean glass in a sink full of dirty dishes". Denny joined the group in May 1968 and had been touring with them for several months before sessions for the second album began. According to author Richie Unterberger Denny's "haunting, ethereal vocals gave Fairport a big boost".

The album has been described by Unterberger as "a near-ideal balance between imaginative reworkings of traditional folk songs ... quality covers of contemporary folk-rock singer-songwriters, some quite obscure ... and original folk-rock material by various members".

The cover features a sketch of the band performing, drawn on a blackboard by Martin Lamble and Sandy Denny in a classroom at the University of Essex and the reverse of the original sleeve shows a photograph of the band performing. The Island Masters 1990 re-release IMCD 97 also features a portrait of Sandy Denny.

In the US, the album was released by A&M Records (SP-4185) with an identical track listing but featuring new cover art, and was re-titled Fairport Convention. The album was also released in Australia and New Zealand by Festival Records with the 'blackboard' front cover and an entirely different back cover to both the US and UK releases.

== Reception and influence ==
Professional ratings
Review scores
Source	Rating
AllMusic	4.5/5 stars
The Encyclopedia of Popular Music	5/5 stars
Pitchfork	8.8/10
Rolling Stone	(favourable)
The Village Voice	A−

In a contemporary review for The Village Voice, American critic Robert Christgau deemed Fairport Convention the "most interesting unknown group" he had listened to in some time, highlighting their take on "Pentangle-style ballads" and Bob Dylan's "I'll Keep It with Mine". Over in England, Melody Maker called them a "top British group who neatly avoid categorizations" and "always produce satisfying music."

Reviewing the 2008 re-issue of the album Pitchfork said: "The album mixes new interpretations of traditional ballads like 'Nottamun Town,' here rendered almost as a raga, with much newer songs, such as their soulful take on Dylan's 'I'll Keep It With Mine' and their ponderous version of Mitchell's 'Eastern Rain.' The best material on Holidays, though, may be their own—the stomping blues-rock of 'Mr. Lacey,' the racing 'No Man's Land,' and the stirring afterlife anthem 'Meet on the Ledge.'"

Neal Casal, of Ryan Adams & the Cardinals, later listed What We Did on Our Holidays as one of his favourite albums of all time. In 2008 Simon Nicol described the album as his favourite, and it was voted number 281 in Colin Larkin's All Time Top 1000 Albums (2000).

== Track listing ==
Side one
No.	Title	Writer(s)	Lead Vocals	Length
1.	"Fotheringay"	Sandy Denny	Sandy Denny	3:06
2.	"Mr Lacey"	Ashley Hutchings	Denny, Iain Matthews	2:55
3.	"Book Song"	Iain Matthews, Richard Thompson	Denny, Matthews	3:13
4.	"The Lord Is in This Place…How Dreadful Is This Place" (based on "Dark Was the Night, Cold Was the Ground" by Blind Willie Johnson)	Hutchings, Thompson, Denny	Denny	2:01
5.	"No Man's Land"	Thompson	Matthews	2:32
6.	"I'll Keep It with Mine"	Bob Dylan	Denny	5:56

Side two
No.	Title	Writer(s)	Lead Vocals	Length
7.	"Eastern Rain"	Joni Mitchell	Denny, Matthews	3:36
8.	"Nottamun Town"	Traditional, arranged by Denny, Matthews, Thompson, Simon Nicol, Hutchings, Martin Lamble	Denny, Matthews, Richard Thompson, Simon Nicol, Ashley Hutchings	3:12
9.	"Tale in Hard Time"	Thompson	Matthews	3:29
10.	"She Moves Through the Fair"	Traditional, arranged by Denny, Matthews, Thompson, Nicol, Hutchings, Lamble	Denny	4:14
11.	"Meet on the Ledge"	Thompson	Denny, Matthews	2:50
12.	"End of a Holiday"	Nicol	Instrumental	1:07

Bonus tracks on reissue
No.	Title	Writer(s)	Length
13.	"Throwaway Street Puzzle"	Hutchings, Thompson	3:30
14.	"You're Gonna Need My Help" (recorded live for BBC Radio's "Symonds on Sunday" show, producer John Walters and engineer Tony Wilson; first transmission: 9 February 1969)	McKinley Morganfield	4:11
15.	"Some Sweet Day"	Felice and Boudleaux Bryant	2:32

== Personnel ==
=== Fairport Convention ===
- Sandy Denny (as Alexandra Elene MacLean Denny) – vocals, 6 & 12-string acoustic guitars, organ, piano, harpsichord
- Iain Matthews – vocals, congas
- Richard Thompson – electric, 6 & 12-string acoustic guitars, piano, accordion, sitar on "Book Song" (uncredited), vocals
- Ashley Hutchings – bass, backing vocals
- Simon Nicol – electric & acoustic guitars, electric autoharp, electric dulcimer, backing vocals
- Martin Lamble – drums, percussion, violin, tabla & footsteps

=== Additional personnel ===
- Bruce Lacey & his robots on "Mr. Lacey"
- Claire Lowther – cello on "Book Song"
- Kingsley Abbott – coins on "The Lord Is in This Place...," backing vocals on "Meet on the Ledge"
- Paul Ghosh, Andrew Horvitch & Marc Ellington – backing vocals on "Meet on the Ledge"
- Peter Ross – harmonica on "Throwaway Street Puzzle"

=== Production and other credits ===
- Recorded at Sound Techniques, London and Olympic Studio No. 1, London (except "The Lord Is in This Place..." recorded at St. Peter's Church, Westbourne Grove, West London). Further work recorded at Morgan Studios, London
- Engineered by John Wood, Sound Techniques, London
- Photography by Richard Bennett Zeff & Annie Brown
- Design by Diogenic Attempts Ltd.
