= Central Synagogue (Great Portland Street) =

Synagogue in the City of London, England

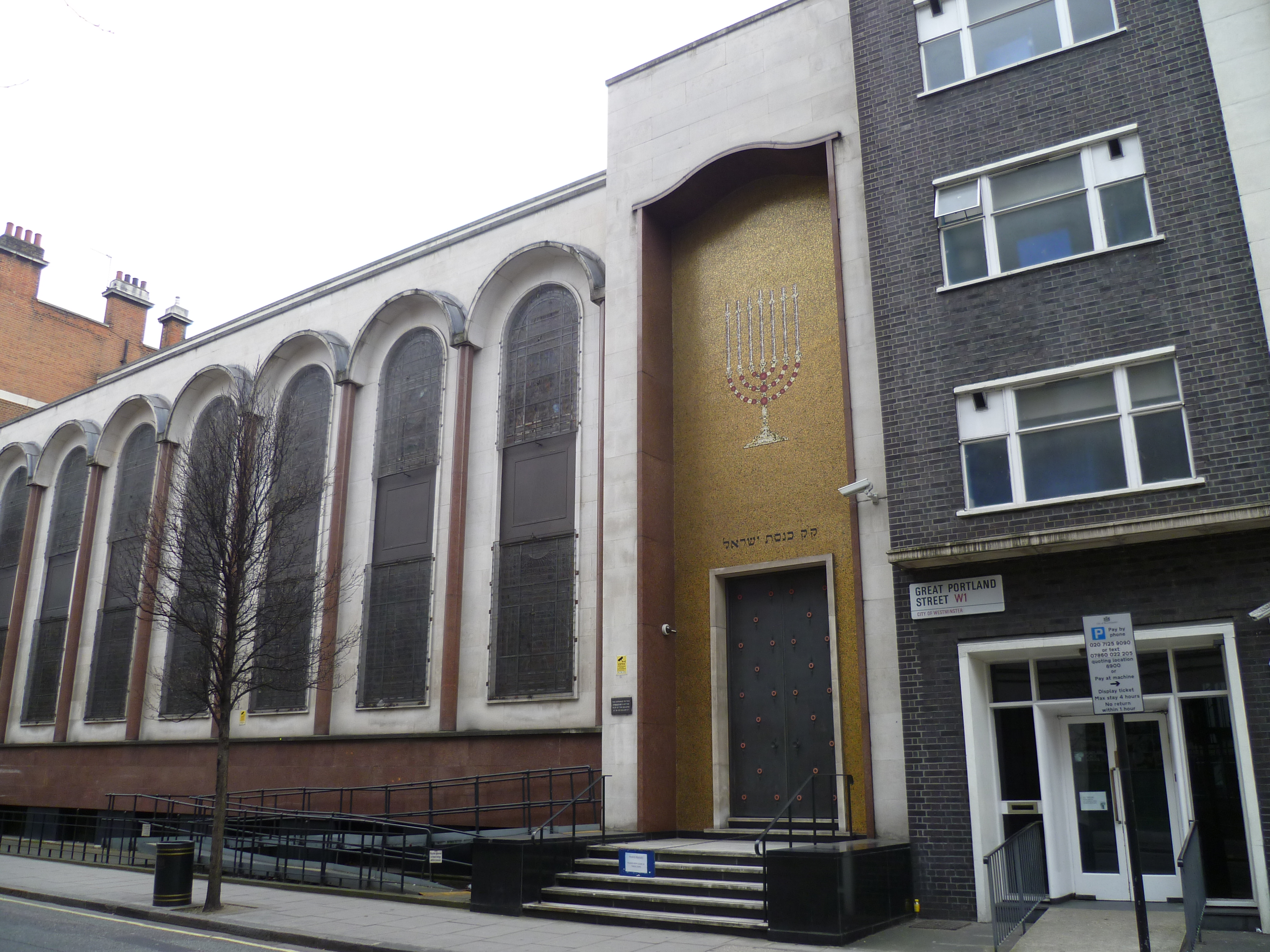
- Central Synagogue, in 2016, viewed from Great Portland Street

- Location of the synagogue in Central London

Religion
- Affiliation: Orthodox Judaism
- Rite: Nusach Ashkenaz
- Ecclesiastical or organisational status: Synagogue
- Leadership: Rabbi Barry Lerer
- Status: Active

Location
- Location: 133-141 Great Portland Street, City of Westminster, London, England WIW 6NW
- Country: United Kingdom
- Coordinates: 51°31′14″N 0°08′35″W

Architecture
- Established: 1848 (as a congregation)
- Completed: 1855 (120 Great Portland St); 1870 (133-141 Great Portland St); 1958 (rebuilt after WWII)
- Destroyed: 10 May 1941 (1870 build)

Website
- centralsynagogue.org.uk

The Central Synagogue is an Orthodox Jewish congregation and synagogue, located at 133-141 Great Portland Street, with additional frontage to Hallam Street, in the City of Westminster, London, England, in the United Kingdom. The congregation worships in the Ashkenazi rite and is a founding member of United Synagogue.

The congregation has been led by Rabbi Barry Lerer since 2018.

== History ==
The congregation was founded in 1848 as a branch of the Great Synagogue of London, and was managed and the supervision of religious services were controlled by 'The Great'. Initially described as Great Portland Street Synagogue, or sometimes Hallam Street Synagogue, the name Central Synagogue was not formally adopted until 1869. The following year, Central Synagogue joined with four other congregations (the Great Synagogue of London, the New Synagogue, Bayswater Synagogue, and The Hambro' Synagogue) to form United Synagogue.

After initially worshiping at a premises Wigmore Street, London, in 1855 the congregation purchased a warehouse at 120 Great Portland Street and converted it for use as a synagogue. A much grander building was completed in 1870, located at 133-141 Great Portland Street and this building served until World War II when, during the London Blitz on 10 May 1941, this synagogue was destroyed.

Once the bombed site was cleared, a temporary synagogue was built in the basement, in use from 1948 until 1956. The current building was constructed in 1958 on the same site as the destroyed synagogue.

== See also ==
- History of the Jews in England
- List of Jewish communities in the United Kingdom
- List of synagogues in the United Kingdom
