= Andrew Cross Award =

Religious Journalism Award in Britain

Andrew Cross Awards were British awards for religious journalism. They were awarded annually by the Churches' Media Council, an association which brought together churches, broadcasters, broadcasting authorities (both commercial and public service agencies) and media educators in celebrating and encouraging the best in journalistic reporting and analysis of religious news and current affairs in radio, television, in print media and online.

The Awards are named in honour of Bishop Agnellus Andrew (1908–1987) and Bishop Stewart Cross, former presidents of the Churches' Advisory Council on Local Broadcasting, the predecessor body of the Churches' Media Council. The Andrew Cross Awards have not been presented since 2006.

In 2009, the Churches Media Council changed its name and its focus, becoming the Church and Media Network, and in 2018, changed its name once again to Christians in Media.
