= Fairport Convention =

English folk rock group

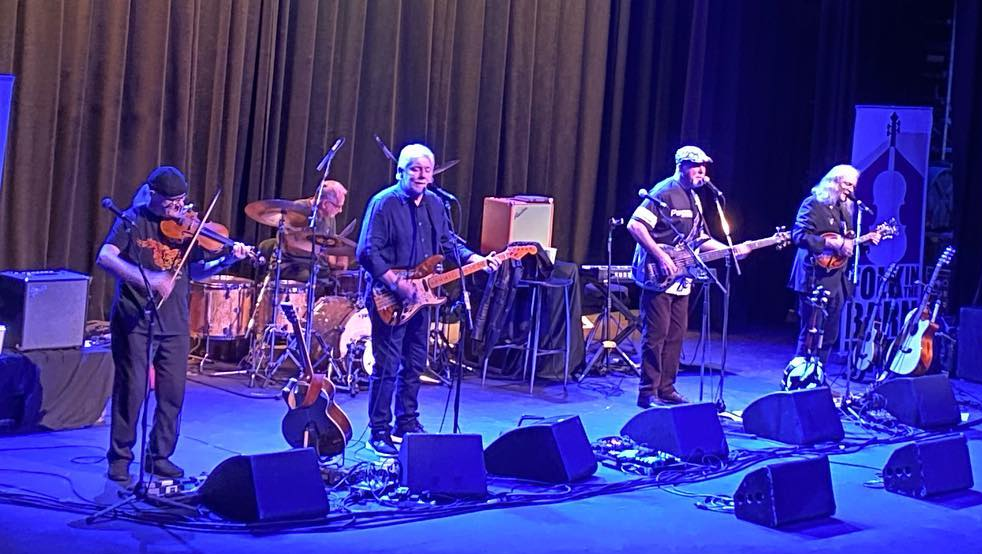
- Fairport Convention performing in 2023

Background information
- Also known as: Fairport
- Origin: London, England
- Genres: Folk rock; folk
- Years active: 1967–1979; 1985–present
- Labels: Polydor; Island; A&M; Vertigo; Rough Trade; Transatlantic; Woodworm; Matty Grooves
- Spinoffs: The Albion Band; Fotheringay; Matthews Southern Comfort; Plainsong; Steeleye Span
- Members: Simon Nicol; Dave Mattacks; Dave Pegg; Ric Sanders; Chris Leslie
- Past members: Richard Thompson; Ashley Hutchings; Shaun Frater; Martin Lamble; Judy Dyble; Iain Matthews; Sandy Denny; Dave Swarbrick; Roger Hill; Tom Farnell; David Rea; Trevor Lucas; Jerry Donahue; Paul Warren; Bruce Rowland; Dan Ar Braz; Bob Brady; Roger Burridge; Maartin Allcock; Gerry Conway
- Website: fairportconvention.com

Fairport Convention are an English folk rock band, formed in 1967 by guitarists Richard Thompson and Simon Nicol, bassist Ashley Hutchings and drummer Shaun Frater (with Frater replaced by Martin Lamble after their first gig). They started out influenced by North American folk rock, with a set list dominated by Bob Dylan and Joni Mitchell songs and a sound that earned them the nickname "the British Jefferson Airplane". Vocalists Judy Dyble and Iain Matthews joined them before the recording of their self-titled debut in 1968; afterwards, Dyble was replaced by Sandy Denny. Matthews left later, during the recording of their third album.

Denny began steering the group towards traditional British music for their next two albums, What We Did on Our Holidays (1968) and Unhalfbricking (1969); the latter featured fiddler Dave "Swarb" Swarbrick, most notably on the song "A Sailor's Life", which laid the groundwork for British folk rock by being the first time a traditional British song was combined with a rock beat. Shortly before the album's release, a crash on the M1 motorway killed Lamble and Jeannie Franklyn, Thompson's girlfriend; this resulted in the group retiring most of their prior material and turning entirely towards British folk music for their seminal album Liege & Lief, released the same year. This style has been the band's focus ever since. For that album Swarbrick joined full-time, alongside drummer Dave Mattacks. Both Denny and Hutchings left before the end of 1969; the latter was replaced by Dave Pegg, who has remained the group's sole consistent member to this day. Thompson left after the recording of 1970's Full House.

The 1970s saw numerous lineup changes around the core of Swarbrick and Pegg – Nicol being absent for the middle of the decade – and declining fortunes as folk music fell out of mainstream favour. Denny, whose partner Trevor Lucas had been a guitarist in the group since 1972, returned for the pop-oriented Rising for the Moon album in 1975 in a final bid to crack America; this effort failed, and after three more albums minus Denny and Lucas, the group disbanded in 1979. They played a farewell concert in the village of Cropredy, Oxfordshire, where they had held small concerts since 1976, and this marked the beginning of the Cropredy Festival (since 2005 known as Fairport's Cropredy Convention) which has become the largest folk festival in Britain, with annual attendances of 20,000.

The band was reformed by Nicol, Pegg, and Mattacks in 1985, joined by Maartin Allcock (guitar, mandolin, keys, vocals) and Ric Sanders (fiddle, keyboards), and they have remained active since that time. Allcock was replaced by Chris Leslie (mandolin, violin, vocals) in 1996, and Gerry Conway replaced Mattacks in 1998. Conway departed in 2022, and Mattacks returned on a part-time basis. The group currently alternate between tours in which Mattacks features, and acoustic tours with just Nicol, Pegg, Sanders and Leslie. Their 29th studio album, Shuffle and Go, was released in 2020, and they continue to headline Cropredy each year.

Despite little mainstream success – their only top 40 single being "Si Tu Dois Partir", a French-language cover of the Dylan song "If You Gotta Go, Go Now" from Unhalfbricking – Fairport Convention remain highly influential in British folk rock and British folk in general. Liege & Lief was named the "Most Influential Folk Album of All Time" at the BBC Radio 2 Folk Awards in 2006, and Pegg's playing style, which incorporates jigs and reels into his basslines, has been imitated by many in the folk rock and folk punk genres. Additionally, many former members went on to form or join other notable groups in the genre (including Fotheringay, Steeleye Span, and the Albion Band), along with having solo careers – most notably those of Thompson and Denny. Sandy Denny, now regarded as being amongst Britain's finest female singer-songwriters, died in 1978; her song "Who Knows Where the Time Goes?" – recorded by Fairport on Unhalfbricking – became a signature song for herself and the band.

== History ==
=== Origins ===
Bassist Ashley Hutchings met guitarist Simon Nicol in north London in 1966 when they both played in the Ethnic Shuffle Orchestra. They rehearsed on the floor above Nicol's father's medical practice in a house called "Fairport" in Muswell Hill – on the same street where Ray and Dave Davies of the Kinks grew up. The house lent its name to the group they formed together as Fairport Convention in 1967 with Richard Thompson on guitar and Shaun Frater on drums. After their initial performance at St Michael's Church Hall in Golders Green on 27 May 1967, they had their first of many line-up changes as one member of the audience, drummer Martin Lamble, convinced the band that he could do a better job than Frater, and replaced him. They soon added a female singer, Judy Dyble, which gave them a distinctive sound among the many London bands of the period.

=== 1967–1969: The first three albums ===
Fairport Convention were soon playing regularly at underground venues such as UFO and The Electric Garden, which later became the Middle Earth club. After only a few months they caught the attention of manager Joe Boyd, who secured them a contract with Polydor Records. Boyd suggested they augment the line-up with another male vocalist. Singer Iain Matthews (at that time known as Ian MacDonald) joined the band; their first album, Fairport Convention, was recorded in late 1967 and released in June 1968. At this early stage Fairport looked to North American folk and folk rock acts such as Joni Mitchell, Bob Dylan, and The Byrds for material and inspiration. The name "Fairport Convention" and the use of two lead vocalists led many new listeners to believe that they were an American act, earning them the nickname 'the British Jefferson Airplane' during this period. Fairport Convention played at the first Isle of Wight Festival, in August 1968, when Jefferson Airplane headlined.

After disappointing album sales, they signed a new contract with Island Records. Before their next recording, Judy Dyble left – she described it as being "unceremoniously dumped" – and was replaced by the band with Sandy Denny, a folk singer who had previously recorded as a soloist and with Strawbs. Denny's arrival encouraged the band to consider integrating British folk music into what had previously been an American-influenced sound, and her distinctive voice (described by Clive James as "open space, low-volume, high-intensity") characterised the December 1968 album What We Did on Our Holidays, and 1969's Unhalfbricking. These recordings marked the growth of much greater musicality and songwriting ability among the band. The first of these featured the Thompson-penned "Meet on the Ledge", which became their second single and eventually the band's unofficial anthem.

During the recording of Unhalfbricking, Matthews left after having sung on only one song, eventually to form Matthews Southern Comfort. He was not replaced; the other male members covered his vocal parts. The album featured a guest appearance by Birmingham folk fiddler Dave Swarbrick on a recording of "A Sailor's Life", a traditional song brought to the band by Denny from her folk club days. The recording of this track marked an important turning point for the band; it sparked in Ashley Hutchings an interest in traditional music that led him to detailed research in the English Folk Dance and Song Society Library at Cecil Sharp House. This theme would become the basis for their next, much more ambitious, recording project.

These two albums began to gain the band wider recognition. Radio DJ John Peel championed their music, playing their albums on his influential BBC shows. Peel also recorded a number of sessions which were later released as the album Heyday (1987). They enjoyed some mainstream success when they entered the singles charts with "Si Tu Dois Partir", a French-language version of Bob Dylan's "If You Gotta Go, Go Now". The record just missed the top twenty, but secured the band a slot on Top of the Pops, Britain's most popular television pop music programme at the time. In 1969 four members of the band, one uncredited and three under pseudonyms, featured as backing musicians on the album Love Chronicles by Scottish folk artist Al Stewart.

==== Developing British folk rock ====
Matty Groves performed by Howie Mitchell

On 12 May 1969, on the way home from a gig at Birmingham venue Mothers, Fairport's van crashed on the M1 motorway. Martin Lamble, aged only nineteen, and Jeannie Franklyn, Richard Thompson's girlfriend, were killed. The rest of the band suffered injuries of differing severity. They nearly decided to disband.

However, they reconvened with Dave Mattacks taking over drumming duties and Dave Swarbrick, having made contribution to Unhalfbricking, now joining as a full member. Boyd set the band up in a rented house in Farley Chamberlayne near Winchester in Hampshire, where they recuperated and worked on this integration, which would result in a new sound and style – made manifest on their fourth album Liege & Lief.

Usually considered the highpoint of the band's long career, Liege & Lief was a huge leap forward in concept and musicality. The album consisted of six traditional tracks and three original compositions in a similar style. The traditional tracks included two sustained epics: "Tam Lin", which was over seven minutes in length, and "Matty Groves", at over eight. There was a medley of four traditional tunes, arranged, and, like many of the tracks, enlivened, by Swarbrick's energetic fiddle playing. The first side was bracketed by original compositions "Come all ye" and "Farewell, Farewell", which, in addition to information on the inside of the gatefold cover on Hutchings' research, explaining English folk traditions, helped give the record the feel of a concept album. "Farewell, Farewell" and the final track "Crazy Man Michael", also saw the full emergence of the distinctive song writing talent of Thompson that was to characterize his contributions to the band and later solo career. The distinctive sound of the album came from the use of electric instruments and Mattacks' disciplined drumming with Swarbrick's fiddle accompaniment in a surprising and powerful combination of rock with the traditional. The entire band had reached new levels of musicality, with the fluid guitar playing of Thompson and the "ethereal" vocal of Denny particularly characteristic of the sound of the album. As the reviewer from AllMusic put it, the album was characterised by the "fusing [of] time-worn folk with electric instruments while honoring both".

A few British bands had earlier experimented with playing traditional English songs on electric instruments, (including Strawbs and Pentangle), but Fairport Convention was the first English band to do this in a concerted and focused way. Fairport Convention's achievement was not to invent folk rock, but to create a distinctly English branch of the genre, which would develop alongside, and interact with, American inspired music, but which can also be seen as a distinctively national reaction in opposition to it. Liege & Lief was launched with a sell-out concert in London's Royal Festival Hall late in 1969. It reached number 17 in the UK album chart, where it spent fifteen weeks.

=== 1970s: A time of change ===
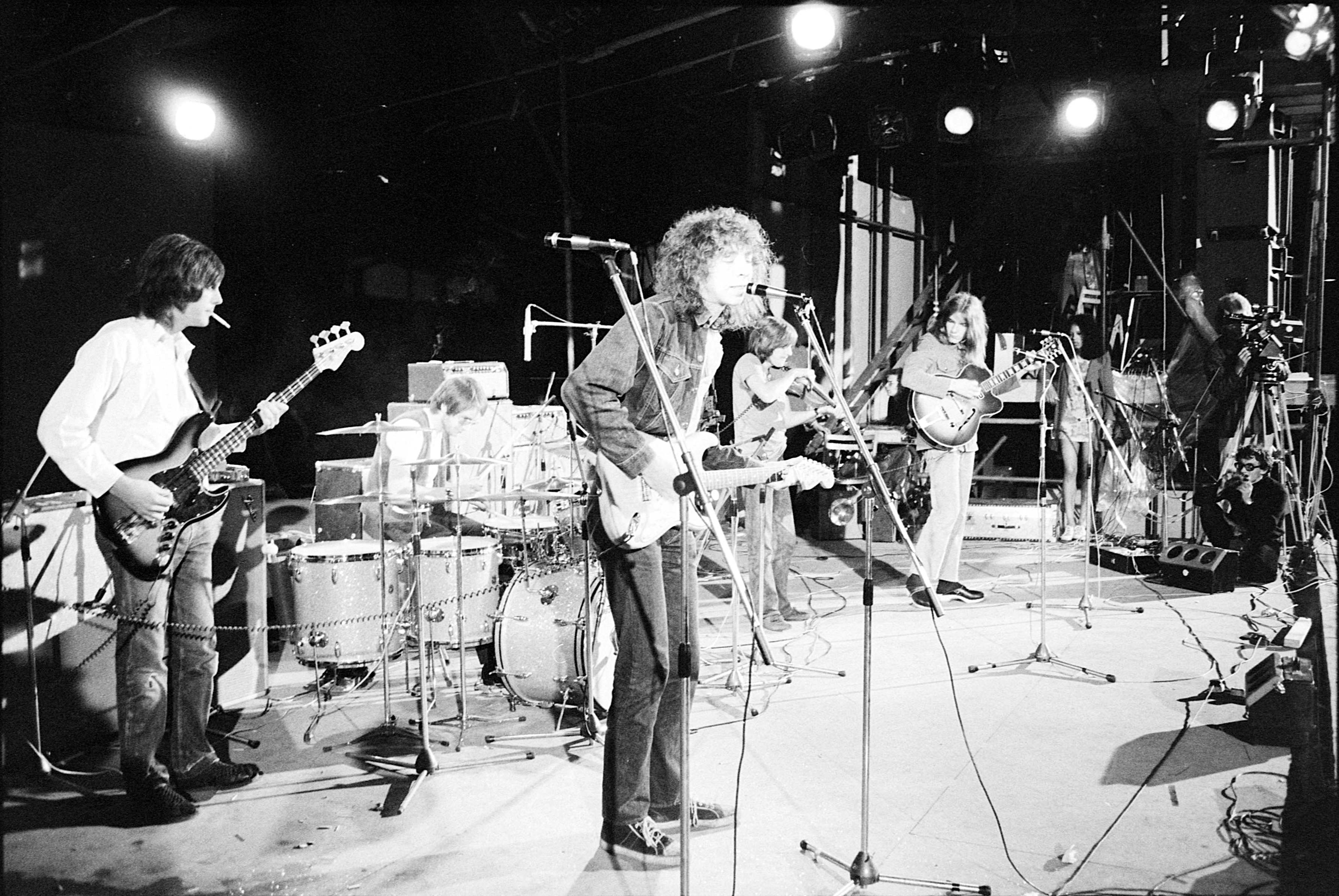
Fairport Convention, Kralingen 1970. Left to right: Dave Pegg, Dave Mattacks, Richard Thompson, Dave Swarbrick, Simon Nicol.

Disagreements arose about the direction of the band in the wake of this success. Ashley Hutchings wanted to explore more traditional material and left to form two groups that would rival Fairport for significance in English folk rock: Steeleye Span and the Albion Band. Sandy Denny also left to found her own group Fotheringay. Dave Pegg took over on bass guitar and has been the group's one constant ever since, in an unbroken membership of over four decades. The band made no serious attempt to replace Denny, and, although she would briefly return, the sound of the band would now be characterised by male vocals.

Despite these changes the band produced another album, Full House (1970), which was remarkably successful as a project. Like its predecessor, it combined traditional songs, including a powerful rendition of "Sir Patrick Spens", with original compositions. The latter benefited from the writing partnership of Thompson and Swarbrick, most obviously on "Walk Awhile", which would become a concert favourite. Despite the loss of Denny the band still possessed four vocalists, including the emerging voices of Nicol and Swarbrick, whose tones would dominate the sound of this period. It was favourably reviewed in Britain and America, drawing comparisons with the Band from Rolling Stone magazine who declared that "Fairport Convention is better than ever". The album reached number 13 in the UK Chart and stayed in the chart for eleven weeks. The same year the band released a single, "Now Be Thankful", and made its American debut, touring with Traffic and Crosby, Stills, Nash & Young.

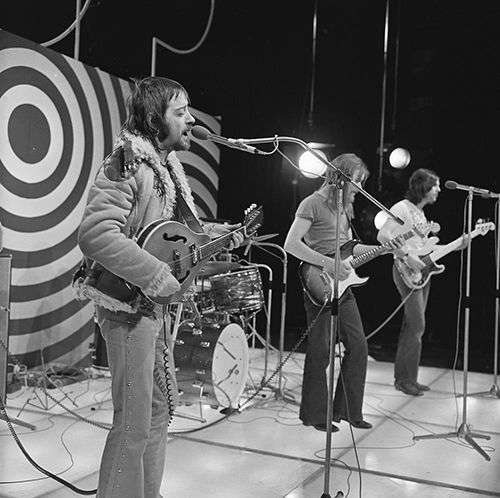
Fairport Convention on a Dutch television show in 1972. Left to right: Dave Swarbrick, Roger Hill, Dave Pegg. Tom Farnell (drums) is hidden behind Swarbrick.

In the recurring pattern, soon after the album's release Thompson left the band to pursue other projects and eventually his solo career. This left Simon Nicol as the only original member, and Dave Swarbrick emerged as the leading force in the band. In 1970 the members and their families had moved into The Angel, a former pub in Hertfordshire, and this inspired the next album Angel Delight (1971) the band's first to chart in the US, peaking at number 200 on the Billboard 200 and their only top ten album in the UK. The next project was an ambitious folk-rock opera developed by Swarbrick, based on the life of John "Babbacombe" Lee, "the man they couldn't hang" and released with the title Babbacombe Lee (1971). The concept format, originally without clear tracks, excited considerable press interest, and it received good air play in the United States where it reached number 195. A version was produced by the BBC for TV in 1975 with narration by Melvyn Bragg. These two albums were also notable as the first time that Fairport had recorded consecutively with the same line-up, but inevitably stability did not last; Simon Nicol left early in late 1971 to join Ashley Hutchings' Albion Country Band, and he was soon followed by Mattacks.

Only Pegg and Swarbrick remained, and the following few years have been dubbed 'Fairport confusion' as a bewildering sequence of band members came and went, but by 1973 Mattacks had returned and two former members of Sandy Denny's Fotheringay had joined the band, Denny's Australian husband Trevor Lucas on vocals and guitar, and American Jerry Donahue on lead guitar. From these line-ups the band produced two studio albums: Rosie, notable for the Swarbrick-penned title track (1973) and Nine (1974), the ninth studio album by the band. The last of these contained writing contributions by Lucas to five of the nine tracks, which together with Donahue's country influences and outstanding guitar pyrotechnics gave the album a very distinctive feel.

Denny rejoined the band in 1974, and there were considerable expectations, both artistic and commercial, placed on this line-up. Denny was featured on the album Rising for the Moon (1975), which became the band's highest US chart album when it reached number 143 on the Billboard 200 and the first album to reach the top hundred in the UK since Angel Delight, reaching No. 52. During the Rising sessions, Mattacks fell out with producer Glyn Johns and was replaced by former Grease Band drummer Bruce Rowland. Poor UK sales for Rising did not aid morale and, despite the relative success of the line-up, Lucas and Donahue left the band, as did Denny in 1976. She died aged 31, in 1978, of a cerebral haemorrhage after falling down a flight of stairs.

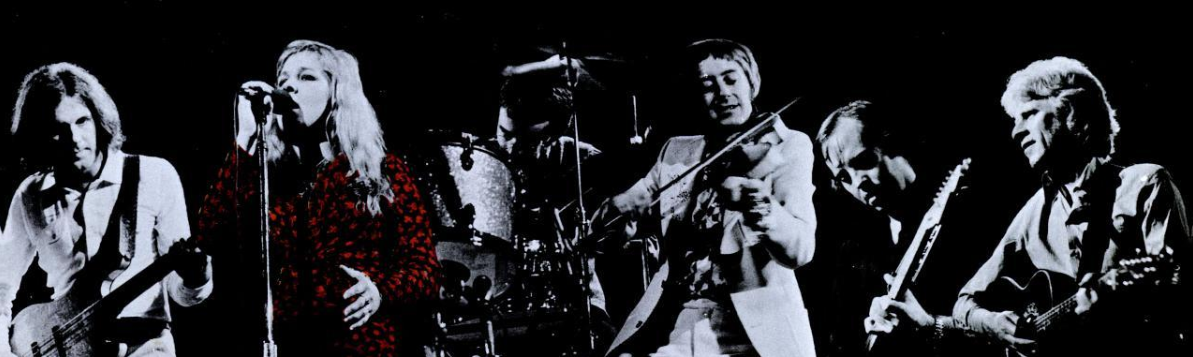
The band with a returning Denny in 1974

Rowland, Pegg, and Swarbrick fulfilled their remaining contractual obligations to Island Records by turning what had originally been a Swarbrick solo effort into the album Gottle O'Geer (1976) under the name 'Fairport' (as opposed to Fairport Convention) in the UK, and as 'Fairport featuring Dave Swarbrick' in the US, and with various session players and production by Simon Nicol, who subsequently rejoined the band. They then signed with Vertigo, but record sales continued to decline; after producing the first two of four albums for which they were contracted, The Bonny Bunch of Roses (1977) and Tipplers Tales (1978), Vertigo bought them out of their contract. It is claimed by members of the band that this was the only recording money they had seen up to that point.

=== 1979–1985: The Cropredy era ===
By 1979 the mainstream market for folk rock had largely disappeared, the band had no record deal, and Dave Swarbrick had been diagnosed with tinnitus, which made loud electric gigs increasingly difficult. Fairport decided to disband. They played a farewell tour and a final outdoor concert on 4 August in Cropredy, the Oxfordshire village where Dave and Christine Pegg lived. The finality of this occasion was mitigated by the announcement that the band would meet for a reunion.

In August 1979, the band played at Knebworth Festival in England. The headline act at both their appearances at the festival, over two consecutive Saturdays on 4 and 11 August, were Led Zeppelin.

No record company wanted to release the live recordings of the tour and concert, so the Peggs founded Woodworm Records, which would be the major outlet for the band in the future. Members continued to take part in occasional gigs, particularly in festivals in continental Europe, and after a year they staged a reunion concert in Cropredy which became the annual Cropredy Festival. Over the next few years, it grew rapidly and emerged as the major mechanism for sustaining the band. In August 1981, the band held their annual reunion concert at Broughton Castle, rather than the usual Cropredy location. The concert was recorded, and released on the 1982 album Moat on the Ledge.

The Peggs continued to record and release the Cropredy concerts as 'official bootlegs'. These were supplemented by New Year's gigs in minor locations including the Half Moon at Putney and the Gloucester Leisure Centre. In 1983 the magazine Fairport Fanatics (later Dirty Linen), was created: a testament to the continued existence of a dedicated fan base.

The Angel Delight lineup of Simon Nicol, Dave Swarbrick, Dave Pegg, and Dave Mattacks played a number of gigs in the UK in the early 80s, then toured extensively in the UK and the US in 1984 and 1985. Band alumni like Richard Thompson and Bruce Rowland would occasionally join in.

The remaining members pursued their own lives and careers outside of the band. Nicol, Pegg, and Mattacks had recorded and toured with Richard and Linda Thompson at times in the 1970s, and did so again during this period, culminating in their appearance on the Shoot Out the Lights album and tour in 1982. Bruce Rowlands gave up the music business and moved to Denmark and as a result Dave Mattacks returned as drummer for Fairport's occasional gigs. Dave Pegg was the first of several Fairporters to join Jethro Tull which gave him well-paying steady employment. Simon Nicol had teamed up with Dave Swarbrick in a highly regarded acoustic duo, but this partnership was made difficult by Swarbrick's sudden decision to move to Scotland, where, from 1984, he began to focus on his new project Whippersnapper.

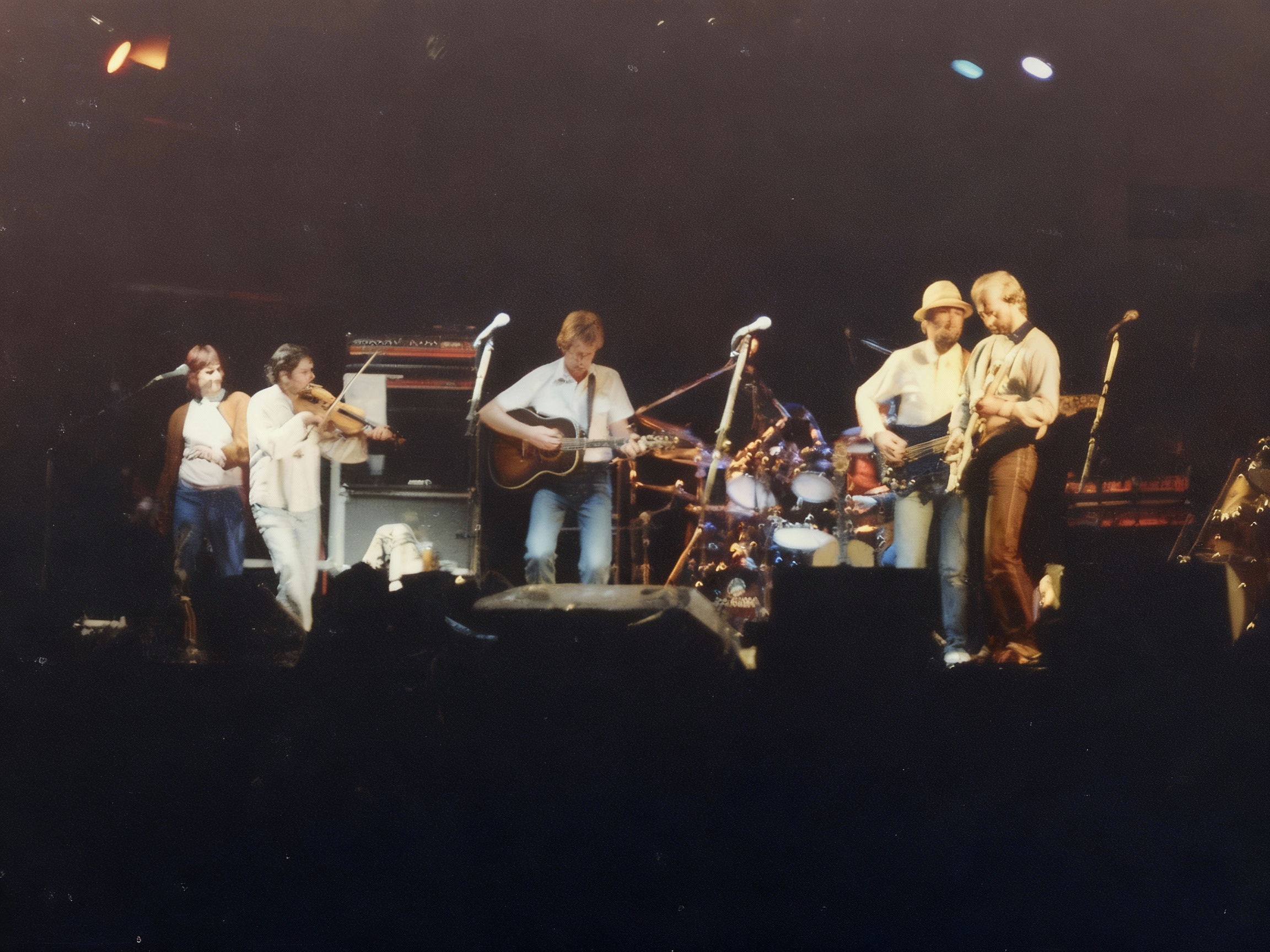
Fairport Convention "Nine" line-up, reunited on stage at Cropredy 1982

In 1985, Pegg, Nicol and Mattacks found that they all had some free time and an available studio belonging to Pegg. They decided that they needed some new material to add to the catalogue that had been suspended in 1978. As Swarbrick was unavailable, the selection of traditional tunes was more difficult than for past albums and there was a need for a replacement fiddle player and some vocals. Pegg and Nicol took over arranging duties on an instrumental medley and the band turned to sometime Albion Band members: jazz and folk violinist Ric Sanders and singer-songwriter Cathy Lesurf. They also had the help of ex-member Richard Thompson. Thompson and Lesurf contributed songs and took part in the recordings. Also important to the album was Ralph McTell who contributed one song and co-wrote one track each with Nicol and Mattacks; the latter of these, "The Hiring Fair", would become a stage fixture of Fairport.

The resulting album Gladys' Leap (1985) was generally well received in the music and national press, but caused some tension with Swarbrick who refused to play any of the new material at the 1985 Cropredy Festival. Nevertheless, the decision to reform the band, without Swarbrick, was taken by the other three remaining members. Ric Sanders was invited to join, along with guitarist, composer, arranger and multi-instrumentalist Maartin Allcock. Nicol, with his developing baritone voice, took over the main share of the vocal duties. This line-up was to last eleven years, the longest period of membership stability in the band's history so far.

=== 1986–1997: Stability ===
The new band began a hectic schedule of performing in Britain and the world and prepared material for a new album. The result was the all-instrumental Expletive Delighted! (1986). This showcased the virtuosity of Sanders and Allcock, but perhaps inevitably was not popular with all fans. This was followed by the recording In Real Time: Live '87 which managed to capture the energy and power of the new Fairport on stage, despite the fact that it was recorded in the studio with audience reactions dubbed on.

In this period the band were playing to larger and larger audiences, both on tour and at Cropredy, and it was very productive in terms of recording. Fairport had the considerable composing and arranging skills of Allcock and, to fill the gap created by a lack of a songwriter in the band, they turned to some of the most talented available in the contemporary folk scene. The results were Red & Gold (1989) The Five Seasons (1990) and Jewel in the Crown (1995), the last of which was judged "their bestselling and undoubtedly finest album in years."

At this point, with Mattacks busy with other projects, the band shifted to an acoustic format for touring and released the unplugged Old New Borrowed Blue as "Fairport Acoustic Convention" in 1996. For a while the four-piece acoustic line-up ran in parallel with the electric format. When Allcock left the band, he was replaced by Chris Leslie on vocals, mandolin and fiddle, who formerly worked with Swarbrick in Whippersnapper, and had a one-off stint with the band replacing Ric Sanders for 1992 Cropredy Festival. This meant that for the first time since reforming, the band had a recognized songwriter who contributed significantly to the band's output on the next album Who Knows Where the Time Goes? (1997), particularly the rousing "John Gaudie". By the time of the 30th anniversary Festival at Cropredy in 1997, the new Fairport had been in existence for over a decade and contributed a significant chapter to the history of the band.

=== 1998–present ===
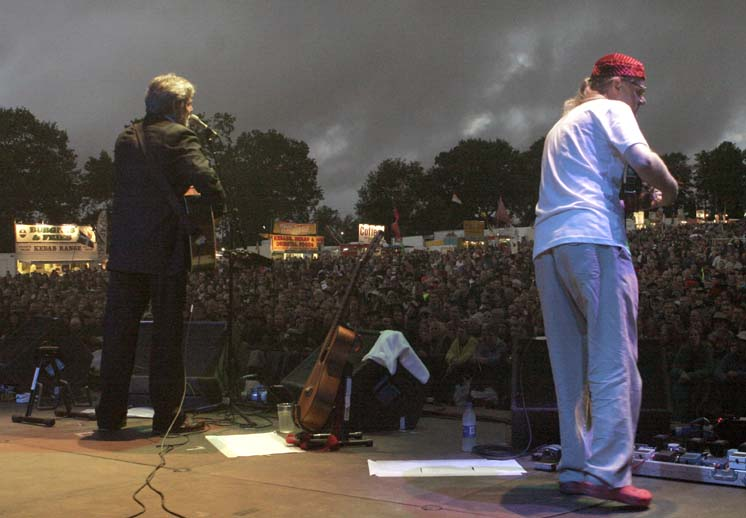
Simon Nicol and Ric Sanders of Fairport Convention on stage at Fairport's Cropredy Convention 2005

Dave Mattacks moved to the US in 1998, and Gerry Conway took over on drums and percussion. Fairport produced two more studio albums for Woodworm Records: The Wood and the Wire (2000) and XXXV (2002). Then, for Over the Next Hill (2004) they established a new label: Matty Grooves Records. In this period the band toured extensively in the UK, Europe, Australasia, Europe, the US and Canada, and staged a major fund raiser for Dave Swarbrick at the Birmingham Symphony Hall. In 1998, members of the band began their association with the Breton musician Alan Simon. Working in collaboration with numerous others, members of Fairport (predominantly Nicol and Leslie) have performed in and participated in the recordings of all Simon's rock operas, including the Excalibur trilogy (1998, 2007, 2010) and Anne de Bretagne (2008).

2007 was their fortieth anniversary year and they celebrated by releasing a new album, Sense of Occasion. They performed the whole of the Liege & Lief album live at Cropredy, since 2004 renamed Fairport's Cropredy Convention, featuring the 1969 line-up of Dave Swarbrick, Ashley Hutchings, Dave Mattacks, Simon Nicol and Richard Thompson, with singer-songwriter Chris While taking the place of Sandy Denny. Footage of the festival, although not the Liege and Lief performance, was released as part of a celebratory DVD.

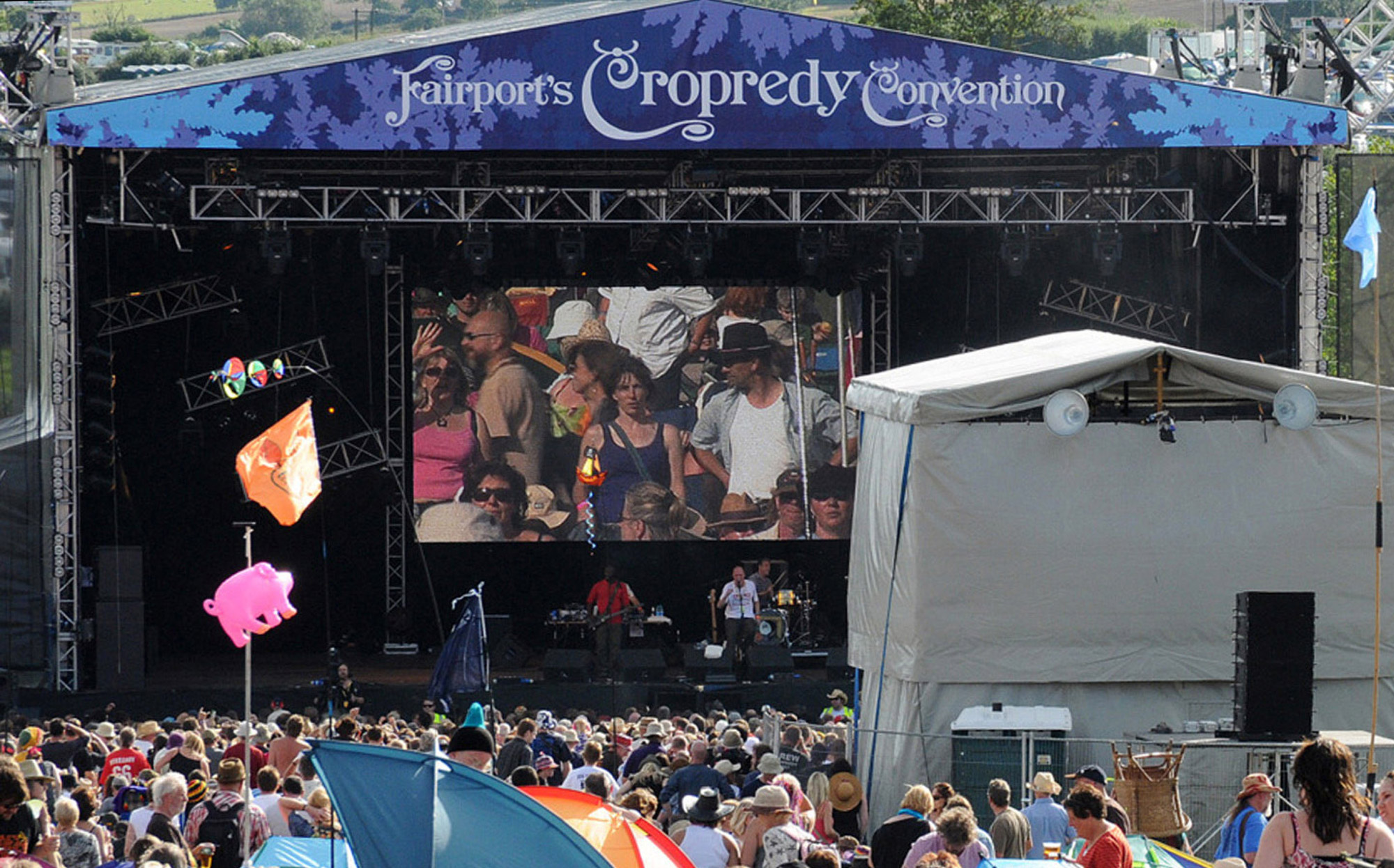
The stage at Fairport's Cropredy Convention in August 2009

The band's first official YouTube video appeared in April 2008. Edited from footage shot for the DVD, the nine-minute mini-documentary includes interviews with Lulu, Jools Holland, Seth Lakeman, Mike Harding, Geoff Hughes and Frank Skinner.

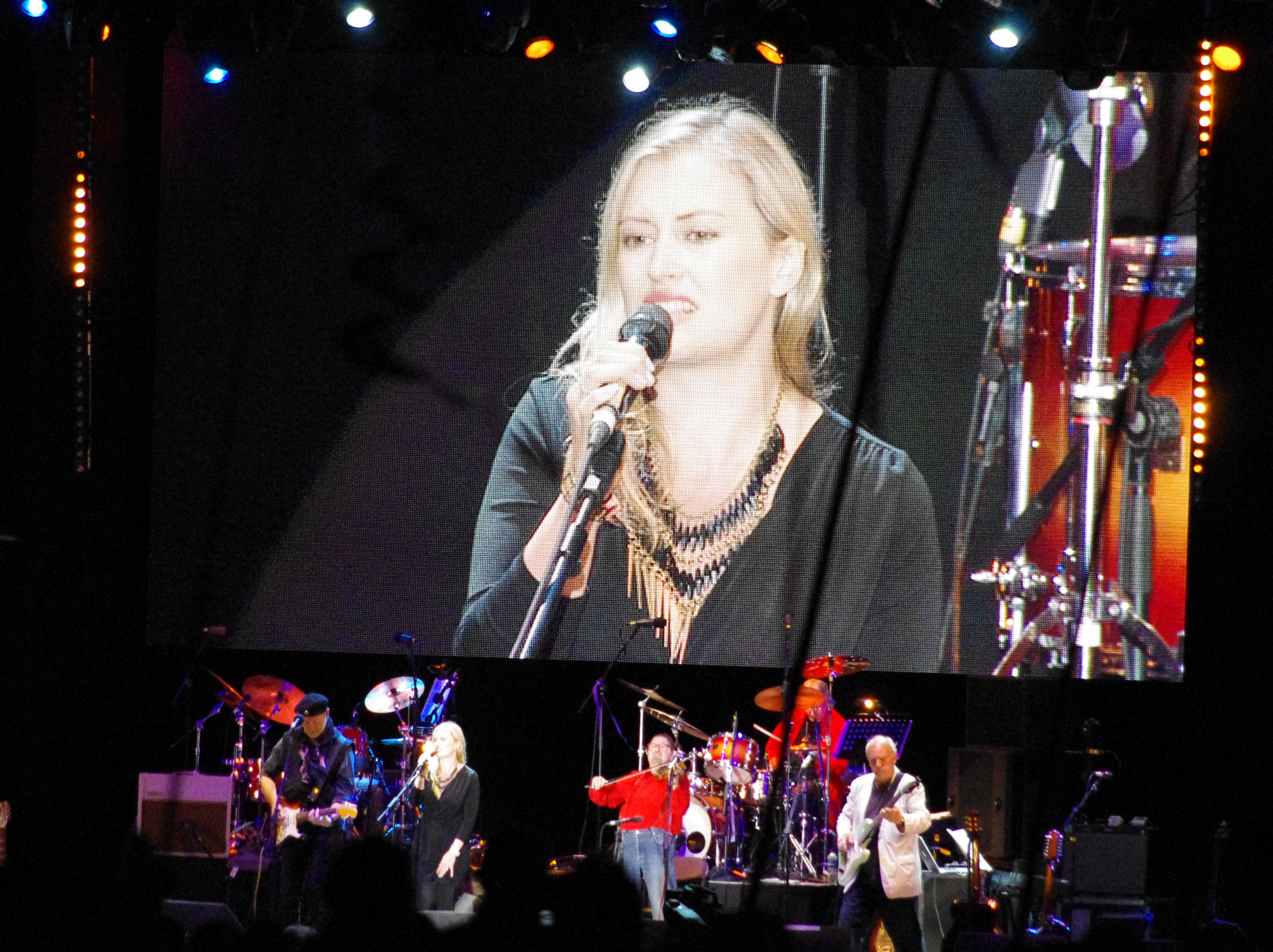
Kami Thompson and Fairport Convention, 2012

In 2011 the band released a new studio album Festival Bell, the first new album in four years. This was followed in 2012 by Babbacombe Lee Live Again recorded live during the 2011 tour revisiting the Babbacombe Lee album first issued in 1971. In 2012, the band also released By Popular Request, a reworking in the studio of a number of the most popular songs in the band's repertoire (as determined by a mysterious consultation and voting process conducted by the band with its fans).

As of 2020 the band continues to write and record music, regularly producing new studio albums, the most recent releases being 2015's Myths and Heroes, 2017's 50:50@50 and 2020's Shuffle and Go. The COVID-19 pandemic impacted significantly on their ability to tour, and their 2022 tour was initially cut short after several of the touring team developed Covid.

In 2022, Gerry Conway made the decision to leave the band after 24 years, and it was announced that the band would continue as a four piece. Conway did not make public that he left because he was suffering from motor neurone disease from which he was to die in April 2024.

On the band's Winter 2023 UK Tour, they were joined by a returning Mattacks on drums and percussion who also returned for the 2024 winter tour.

== Public recognition ==
The mainstream media has increasingly recognized Fairport Convention's historical importance. They received a "Lifetime Achievement Award" at the 2002 BBC Radio 2 Folk Awards. In the same year Free Reed Records, an independent label, released Fairport Unconventional, a four-CD boxed set of rare and unreleased recordings from the band's 35-year career. At the 2006 BBC Radio 2 Folk Awards they received an award when their seminal album Liege & Lief was voted 'Most Influential Folk Album of All Time' by Radio 2 listeners. At the 2007 BBC Radio 2 Folk Awards Fairport Convention received an award recognising the late Sandy Denny and the band for "Favourite Folk Track of All Time" for "Who Knows Where the Time Goes?".

== Personnel ==
=== Members ===
Current members

- Simon Nicol – guitar, dulcimer, lead vocals, keyboards (1967–1971, 1976–1979, 1985–present)
- Dave Mattacks – drums, percussion, keyboards, bass guitar (1969–1972, 1973–1975, 1985–1997, 2023–present)
- Dave Pegg – bass guitar, mandolin, backing vocals, guitar, fiddle, drums (1969–1979, 1985–present)
- Ric Sanders – fiddles, keyboards, ukulele, backing vocals (1985–present)
- Chris Leslie – mandolin, fiddle, bouzouki, vocals, guitar, flute (1996–present)

== Discography ==
1. Fairport Convention (1968)
2. What We Did on Our Holidays (1968)
3. Unhalfbricking (1969)
4. Liege & Lief (1969)
5. Full House (1970)
6. Angel Delight (1971)
7. "Babbacombe" Lee (1971)
8. Rosie (1973)
9. Nine (1973)
10. Rising for the Moon (1975)
11. Gottle O'Geer (1976)
12. The Bonny Bunch of Roses (1977)
13. Tipplers Tales (1978)
14. Gladys' Leap (1985)
15. Expletive Delighted! (1986)
16. Red & Gold (1988)
17. The Five Seasons (1990)
18. Jewel in the Crown (1995)
19. Old New Borrowed Blue (1996)
20. Who Knows Where the Time Goes? (1997)
21. The Wood and the Wire (1999)
22. XXXV (2002)
23. Over the Next Hill (2004)
24. Sense of Occasion (2007)
25. Festival Bell (2011)
26. By Popular Request (2012)
27. Myths and Heroes (2015)
28. 50:50@50 (2017)
29. Shuffle and Go (2020)

== Filmography ==
- Tony Palmer's Film of Fairport Convention and Matthews Southern Comfort, directed by Tony Palmer, featuring Fairport's appearance at the Maidstone Fiesta in 1970. Originally released as a VHS video by MusicFolk/Weintraub, re-released on DVD by Voiceprint Records in 2007, soundtrack CD issued by Voiceprint as Live in Maidstone 1970 in 2009.
