= Chris Leslie (musician) =

British folk rock musician

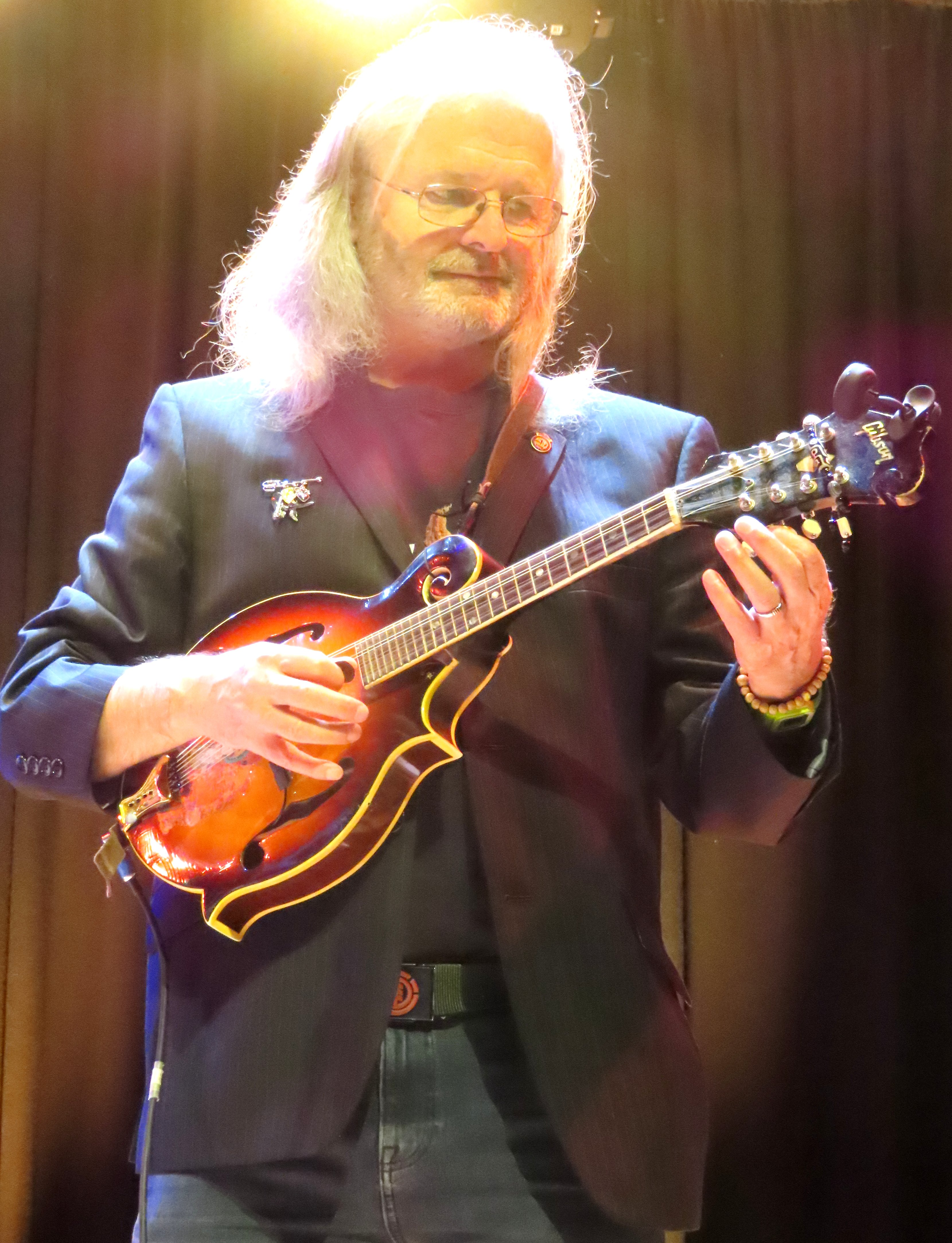
- Leslie performing with Fairport Convention in 2022

Background information
- Born: Christopher Julian Leslie; 15 December 1956 (age 69); Banbury, Oxfordshire, England
- Genres: English folk; British folk rock
- Occupations: Musician; songwriter
- Instruments: Violin; mandolin; bouzouki; ukulele; flute; guitar; vocals
- Years active: 1973–present
- Member of: Fairport Convention; Feast of Fiddles; St Agnes Fountain
- Formerly of: Albion Band; Whippersnapper
- Website: chrislesliemusic.co.uk

Christopher Julian Leslie (born 15 December 1956) is a British folk rock musician. He joined Fairport Convention in 1997.

== Early years ==
Leslie grew up in Banbury, Oxfordshire. His brother John steered him toward The Watersons' Frost and Fire, Dave Swarbrick, and The Corries. In 1969 he began to teach himself fiddle and modelled himself on the fiddle-playing of Dave Swarbrick of Fairport Convention, Peter Knight of Steeleye Span, and Barry Dransfield.

Leslie made his first recording at the age of 16, with a Banbury-based folk rock band and then went on to forge a successful career around the folk clubs with his brother John – cutting their first album, The Ship of Time in 1976. During this period he was also the fiddle player for The Hookey Band and a member of the morris dancers at Adderbury. It was around this time that he first came to the attention of Fairport's Dave Pegg.

From 1981 to 1983 Chris Leslie studied violin making, under the watchful eye of maker Patrick Jowett, at the Newark School of Violin Making in Nottinghamshire, England. He currently plays the second fiddle he made at Newark on stage.

== Session work ==
Since then he has worked with Steve Ashley, Whippersnapper, the Albion Band, All About Eve, Simon Mayor and Ian Anderson (of Jethro Tull). In 1981 he contributed to a cassette tape of peace songs by Steve Ashley released by CND entitled Demo Tapes. Also on the tape were sessions by members of Fairport Convention, Dave Pegg, Simon Nicol and Bruce Rowland. In 1983 he contributed to More Demo Tapes, another Steve Ashley cassette album for CND. He also accompanied Steve Ashley on his song "Down By the Old Embankment" on the album All Through the Year (1991). This was a compilation of original tracks by various artists. He also appeared on People on the Highway (Bert Jansch tribute album, 2000). There were other appearances on Steve Ashley albums (see discography). In 2003, Chris played violin on several tracks from Mostly Autumn's album Passengers. In late 2007 he recorded violin and mandolin parts on Dan Crisp's debut album Far From Here.

== With Fairport and solo albums ==
In 1997 he joined Fairport Convention as singer, songwriter and multi-instrumentalist. He has recorded five solo albums – The Flow, The Gift, Dancing Days, Origins, Turquoise Tales and Fiddle Back. At first sight Dancing Days appears to be a Fairport Convention album, as it features Simon Nicol, Dave Pegg, Ashley Hutchings and Ric Sanders. However, each of these artists appears only in a sequence of duos with Leslie. He has also recorded collaborations with Ashley Hutchings including Grandson of Morris On .

Chris also takes part in an annual Christmas tour with St Agnes Fountain and also takes part in "A Feast of Fiddles" – a collaboration with Peter Knight, Tom Leary (The Hookey Band), Ian Cutler, Phil Beer (Show of Hands) and Brian McNeill (The Battlefield Band).

== Personal life ==
He is Buddhist, a vegetarian, and a teetotaler.

== Discography ==
=== Solo ===
- 1994 – The Gift
- 1997 – The Flow
- 2004 – Dancing Days
- 2013 – Origins
- 2015 – Turquoise Tales
- 2020 – Fiddle Back

=== In groups ===
- 1985 – Whippersnapper: Promises
- 1987 – Whippersnapper: Tsubo
- 1988 – Whippersnapper: These Foolish Strings
- 1990 – Whippersnapper: Fortune
- 1991 – Whippersnapper: Stories
- 1996 – The Albion Band: Demi Paradise
- 1997 – Fairport Convention: Who Knows Where the Time Goes?
- 1999 – Fairport Convention: The Wood and the Wire
- 2001 – St Agnes Fountain: Acoustic Carols for Christmas
- 2001 – Fairport Convention: XXXV
- 2002 – Morris on Band: Grandson of Morris On
- 2002 – St Agnes Fountain: Comfort and Joy
- 2004 – Feast of Fiddles: Nicely Wrong
- 2004 – Fairport Convention: Over the Next Hill
- 2006 – St Agnes Fountain: The White Xmas Album
- 2007 – Fairport Convention: Sense of Occasion
- 2008 – St Agnes Fountain: Soal Cake
- 2010 – Feast of Fiddles: Walk Before You Fly
- 2010 – St Agnes Fountain: Spirit of Christmas
- 2011 – Fairport Convention: Festival Bell
- 2012 – Fairport Convention: By Popular Request
- 2012 – St Agnes Fountain: Twelve Years of Christmas
- 2013 – Feast of Fiddles: Rise Above It
- 2014 – St Agnes Fountain: Christmas is Not Far Away
- 2015 – Fairport Convention: Myths and Heroes
- 2017 – Fairport Convention: 50:50@50
- 2017 – Feast of Fiddles: Sleight of Elbow
- 2017 – St Agnes Fountain: 25/12
- 2020 – Fairport Convention: Shuffle and Go
- 2021 – St Agnes Fountain: Night of a Million Stars
- 2025 – St Agnes Fountain: Flakes and Flurries

=== Appearances with Steve Ashley ===
- 1981 – Demo Tapes
- 1982 – Steve Ashley's Family Album
- 1985 – More Demo Tapes
- 1989 – Mysterious Ways
- 1991 – All Through The Year
- 1999 – The Test of Time
- 2000 – People on the Highway
- 2001 – Everyday Lives
- 2006 – Live in Concert
- 2007 – Time And Tide
- 2021 – Steve Ashley's Family Album Revisited
