= Fairport Convention (album) =

Studio album by Fairport Convention
- Released: June 1968
- Recorded: November 1967
- Studios: Sound Techniques, London
- Genre: Folk rock
- Length: 37:46
- Labels: UK: Polydor; US: Cotillion
- Producers: Joe Boyd, Tod Lloyd

Fairport Convention chronology
Fairport Convention (1968)	What We Did on Our Holidays (1968)

Professional ratings
Review scores
Source	Rating
AllMusic	4.5/5 stars
Select	2/5 medals

Fairport Convention is the debut studio album by the English folk rock band Fairport Convention. The band formed in 1967, with the original line-up consisting of Richard Thompson (guitar); Simon Nicol (guitar); Ashley “Tyger” Hutchings (bass); and Shaun Frater (drums), who was replaced after their first gig by Martin Lamble. They were joined by Judy Dyble (vocals), and Ian MacDonald (later known as Iain Matthews) after they made their major London stage debut in one of Brian Epstein’s Sunday concerts at the Saville Theatre.

With an approach strongly influenced by Jefferson Airplane's first two albums, as opposed to the electric traditional folk for which the group later became famous, the debut album features songs by Emitt Rhodes, Joni Mitchell and Jim & Jean, adaptations of poems by George Painter and Bob Dylan, and some original material.

This is the only Fairport Convention studio album on which Judy Dyble sings. She left in 1968 and was replaced by Sandy Denny but during her short time with the band she made an impression. A later article commented on her on-stage habit of knitting dishcloths and scarves when not actually singing.

The album should not be confused with the A&M Records' Fairport Convention, the USA release/re-titling of their second UK album, What We Did on Our Holidays. The first album, listed as a product of Polydor-England, was finally released in the U.S. on Cotillion Records in 1970.

== Track listing ==
Side one
No.	Title	Writer(s)	Lead Vocals	Length
1.	"Time Will Show the Wiser"	Emitt Rhodes	Iain Matthews	3:04
2.	"I Don't Know Where I Stand"	Joni Mitchell	Judy Dyble	3:43
3.	"If (Stomp)"	Ian MacDonald, Richard Thompson	Matthews	2:45
4.	"Decameron"	Paul Ghosh, Andrew Horvitch, Thompson	Matthews, Dyble	3:42
5.	"Jack O'Diamonds"	Bob Dylan, Ben Carruthers	Matthews	3:28
6.	"Portfolio"	Judy Dyble, Tyger Hutchings	Instrumental	1.58

Side two
No.	Title	Writer(s)	Lead Vocals	Length
7.	"Chelsea Morning"	Joni Mitchell	Dyble, Matthews (Chorus)	3:03
8.	"Sun Shade"	Ghosh, Horvitch, Thompson	Matthews	3:46
9.	"The Lobster"	George Painter, Hutchings, Thompson	Matthews	4:45
10.	"It's Alright Ma, It's Only Witchcraft"	Hutchings, Thompson	Matthews	3:12
11.	"One Sure Thing"	Harvey Brooks, Jean Glover	Dyble	2:52
12.	"M.1 Breakdown"	Hutchings, Simon Nicol	Instrumental	1:23

2003 reissue bonus tracks
No.	Title	Writer(s)	Lead Vocals	Length
13.	"Suzanne"	Leonard Cohen	Matthews	5:45
14.	"If I Had a Ribbon Bow"	Hughie Prince, Lou Singer	Dyble	2:40
15.	"Morning Glory"	Larry Beckett, Tim Buckley	Matthews	3:09
16.	"Reno, Nevada"	Richard Fariña	Dyble, Matthew	7:43

== Personnel ==
=== Fairport Convention ===
- Judy Dyble – lead vocals, electric and acoustic autoharps, recorder, piano, pedal harmonium
- Ian MacDonald (Iain Matthews) – lead vocals, Jew's harp
- Richard Thompson – vocals, lead electric and acoustic guitars, mandolin
- Simon Nicol – vocals, electric 12- and 6-string and acoustic guitars
- Ashley Hutchings – bass guitar, jug
- Martin Lamble – percussion, violin

=== Additional personnel ===
- Claire Lowther – cello
