= Ric Sanders =

English violinist

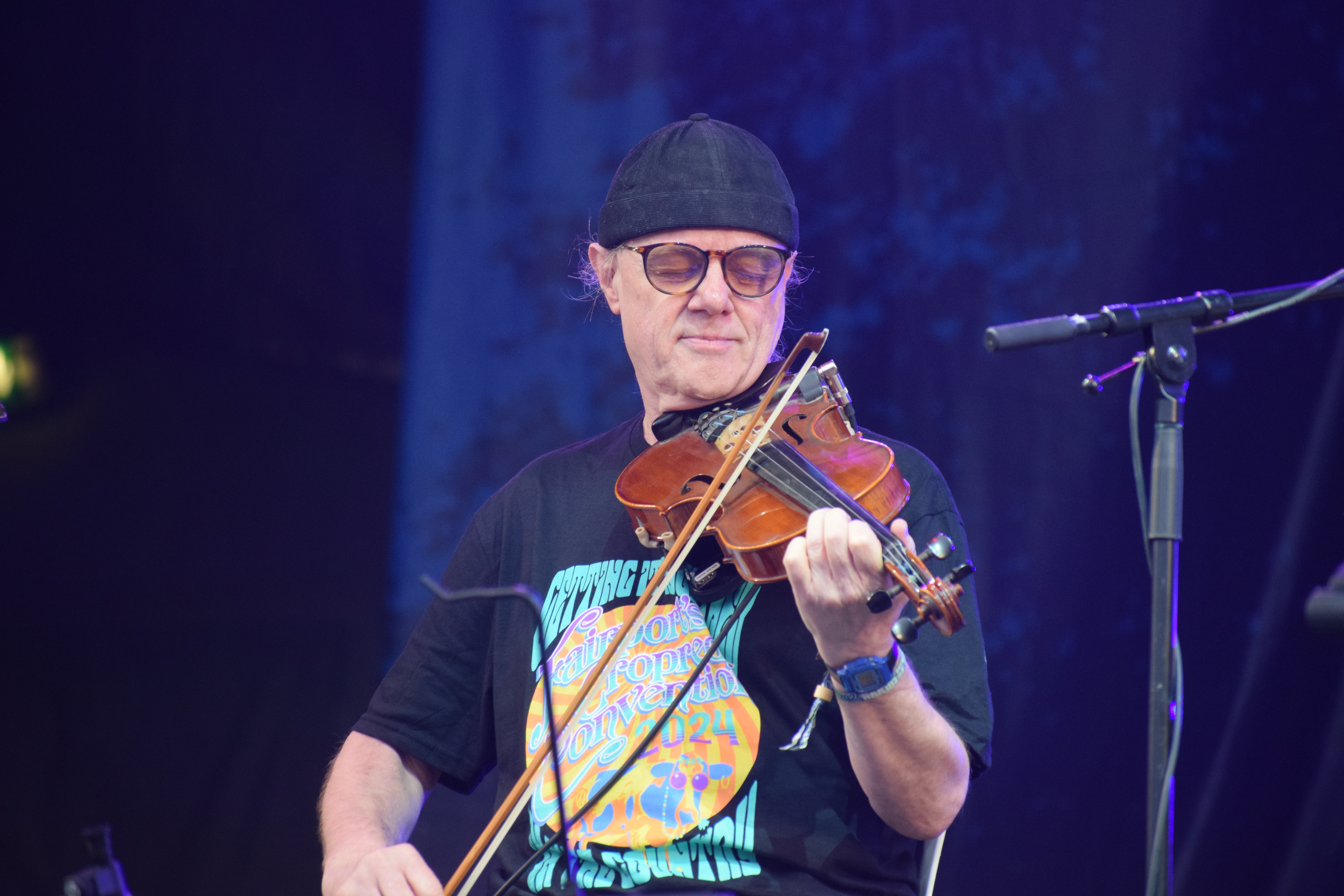
- Sanders performing at Fairport's Cropredy Convention, 2024

Background information
- Born: Richard Sanders; 8 December 1952 (age 73); Birmingham, Warwickshire, England
- Genres: English folk music; folk rock; jazz; jazz fusion
- Occupation: Musician
- Instruments: Violin; percussion; keyboards; piano; ukulele
- Years active: 1972–present
- Labels: Rounder; Woodworm; Green Linnet; Matty Grooves; Rough Trade; Talking Elephant

Richard Sanders (born 8 December 1952) is an English violinist who has played in jazz-rock, folk rock and folk groups, including Soft Machine and Fairport Convention.

== Biography ==
Sanders' first experience with a professional band was in the summer of 1972, touring Europe with classical/rock percussionist Stomu Yamash'ta's Red Buddha Theatre. He later went on to play with jazz pianists Johnny Patrick and Michael Garrick. In the late 1970s, he briefly toured as a member of the jazz-rock group Soft Machine and followed with a stint in The Albion Band. In 1981, he co-founded a recording studio, Morgreen Studios, with which he remained active for a few years. In 1984, he joined Fairport Convention and recorded his first album with them, Gladys' Leap, the following year. Since 2002, in addition to his work with Fairport, he has also been working regularly with his trio, known as the Ric Sanders Trio, which features Vo Fletcher on guitar and Michael Gregory on drums and percussion.

== Professional associations ==
Over the years Sanders has worked with Rick Wakeman, Dave Cousins of Strawbs, Jethro Tull, Robert Plant, Roy Harper, Gary Brooker of Procol Harum, Pentangle, Gordon Giltrap, Andrew Cronshaw, June Tabor, Martin Simpson, Charlie Landsborough, All About Eve, The Mission, Fred Thelonious Baker, Catherine Howe and John Etheridge (guitarist with Soft Machine and Stéphane Grappelli) with whom he co-led the group 2nd Vision.

== Discography ==
=== As leader ===
- Second Vision with John Etheridge (1980)
- String Time (1983)
- Whenever (1984)
- One to One with Gordon Giltrap (1989)
- Neither Time or Distance (1991)
- Parable: Music for the Anjali Dance Company (2003)
- In Lincoln Cathedral (2004)
- Still Waters (2008)
- Standin' on the Corner (2015)
- Headspace (2019)

=== As co-leader or sideman ===
With The Albion Band

- Rise Up Like the Sun (1978)

With Fairport Convention

- Gladys' Leap (1985)
- Expletive Delighted! (1986)
- In Real Time (1987)
- Red and Gold (1989)
- The Five Seasons (1990)
- Jewel in the Crown (1995)
- Old, New, Borrowed, Blue (1996)
- Who Knows Where the Time Goes? (1997)
- The Wood and the Wire (1999)
- XXXV (2001)
- Over the Next Hill (2004)
- Sense of Occasion (2007)
- Festival Bell (2011)
- By Popular Request (2012)
- Myths and Heroes (2015)
- 50:50@50 (2017)
- Shuffle and Go (2020)

With Soft Machine

- Alive & Well: Recorded in Paris (1978)

=== As guest ===
'With All About Eve

- All About Eve (1988)
- Scarlet and Other Stories (1989)

With Andrew Cronshaw

- The Andrew Cronshaw CD (1989)
- The Language of Snakes (1993)
- Till the Beasts' Returning (1987)
- Wade in the Flood (1978)

With English Air

- English Air (1983)
- The Space Inbetween (1985)

With Gordon Giltrap

- A Midnight Clear (1987)
- One to One (1989)
- Peacock Party (1979)

With Ashley Hutchings

- Songs from the Shows (1990)
- The Guv'nor's Big Birthday Bash (1995)

With others

- Mick Stevens: The Englishman (1979)
- June Tabor: "A Cut Above" (1980)
- Martin Simpson: Special Agent (1981)
- Pete York: String Time in New York (1983)
- Loudon Wainwright III: I'm Alright (1984)
- Phenomena: Phenomena (1985)
- Mark Geronimo: London Moon & Barnyard Remedy (1986)
- The Bodhi-Beat Poets: White Light (1987)
- Jethro Tull: Crest of a Knave (1987)
- Simon Nicol: Before Your Time... (1987)
- Gerry Rafferty: North and South (1988)
- June Tabor: Aqaba (1988)
- The Mission: Masque (1992)
- Martin Barre: A Trick of Memory (1994)
- The Albion Band: Live at the Cambridge Folk Festival (1996)
- Judy Dunlop & Ashley Hutchings: Sway with Me (1996)
- Roy Harper: The Dream Society (1998)
- Jerry Donahue: Telecasting Recast (1999)
- Bob Fox: Dreams Never Leave You (2000)
- Strawbs: The Complete Strawbs: Live at Chiswick House (2000)
- Richard Greene & Beryl Marriott: Hands Across the Pond (2001)
- Rick Wakeman and Dave Cousins: Hummingbird (2002)
- Chris Leslie: Dancing Days (2004)
- P. J. Wright: Hedge of Sound (2005)
- Rainbow Chasers: Fortune Never Sleeps (2006)
- Durbervilles: Alternative Route to All Destinations (2007)
- Aquarium: Loshad' Belaya (White Horse) (2008)
- Tiny Tin Lady: Ridiculous Bohemia (2008)
- Red Shoes: All The Good Friends (2012)
- Nik Kershaw: Ei8ght (2012)
- TangleMist: Butterflies & Bees (2020)
- Rosalie Cunningham: Two Piece Puzzle (2022)
- Rosalie Cunningham: To Shoot Another Day (2024)
- Matt’s His Name: Chapter (2025)
- Two Headed Emperor: Cosmic Quark and the Morning Lark (2026)
