= Woodworm Records =

Former British record label

Coordinates: 51.9918°N 1.3661°W

- Founded: 1979
- Founder: Dave Pegg, Christine Pegg
- Genre: Various
- Country of origin: England

Woodworm Records was a record label created in 1979 to enable the British folk-rock band Fairport Convention to release their album Farewell, Farewell. The album was a recording of performances taken from the band's 1979 farewell tour. The impending break-up of the band had followed medical advice given to fiddle-player Dave Swarbrick to save his hearing by playing no more amplified music. As there was no record label willing to release the recording, bass guitarist Dave Pegg and his wife Christine formed their own label to release the album.

Woodworm Records soon grew and released albums by Fairport and other artists such as Dave Swarbrick and Steve Ashley. During 2004 the Peggs were divorced, resulting in the sale of studio. The record label was thus put on hold. Members of Fairport Convention decided to form the new label Matty Grooves Records to continue the work of Woodworm Records.

Associated with the label, and especially with Fairport Convention in recent years, are Woodworm Recording Studios, situated at Barford St. Michael in Oxfordshire, where other artists, including Jethro Tull and Richard Thompson, have also recorded.

== See also ==
- List of record labels
