= Mandolinquents =

British musical quartet

- Genres: Folk, classical, world, comedy music.
- Instrument(s): Mandolin, mandola, mandocello, guitar, mandobass
- Years active: 1997–present
- Labels: Acoustics Records
- Members: Simon Mayor; Hilary James; Gerald Garcia; Richard Collins
- Past members: Maartin Allcock; Chris Leslie
- Website: mandolinquents.com

The Mandolinquents (also known as Simon Mayor's Mandolinquents) is a British musical quartet. It was formed by its core members Simon Mayor (mandolin, violin, guitar) and Hilary James (mandobass, vocals). In the present line up, which has been together since 1997, they are joined by Gerald Garcia (classical guitar) and Richard Collins (mandolin, 5-string banjo).

== History ==
The Mandolinquents was formed in the aftermath of The Mandolin All Stars (1995–1997) in which Simon Mayor and Hilary James were joined by Maartin Allcock (mandocello) and Chris Leslie (mandolin, violin), both of whom are variously associated with the British folk-rock bands Fairport Convention, Jethro Tull and The Albion Band. In 1997 Maartin Allcock and Chris Leslie left to be replaced by Gerald Garcia and Richard Collins. The same year, the new line up recorded its first album Mandolinquents, with both Allcock and Leslie guesting. The new line up adopted the name The Mandolinquents and has remained together to the present day. They play regularly at arts centres and festivals within the UK and Europe, including a residency Mandolinquents & Friends since 2007 at New Greenham Arts, Newbury, England. They have been regular guests on the BBC Radio 2 programmes Friday Night Is Music Night and In Tune on BBC Radio 3.

== Repertoire ==
The repertoire is eclectic, and a mix of instrumental and vocal pieces. It draws on traditional music of Britain, Ireland, China and the Americas, swing, original music by band leader Simon Mayor, and adaptations of pieces from the classical repertoire for the core instrumental line up of two mandolins, classical guitar and mandobass. The bluegrass background of Richard Collins adds another dimension with occasional items featuring the 5-string banjo. Humour has always been an important feature of live performances.

== Band members ==
Simon Mayor is a prominent British mandolinist who has produced six solo albums, four instructional books and two instructional DVDs. He has toured internationally performing and teaching on the instrument. He contributes a regular column on the mandolin to Acoustic Magazine.

Gerald Garcia is a classical guitarist who became a professional musician after studying chemistry at Oxford University. He has recorded nine albums of guitar music on the Naxos label. He has composed extensively for the guitar and for film scores. He is currently musical director of the National Youth Guitar Ensemble (NYGE).

Hilary James became a professional singer after completing a degree in fine art at Reading University. She has recorded five solo albums and various collaborations with her partner Simon Mayor. With Mayor, she developed a keen interest in writing and performing music for children and has written for children's programmes on BBC radio and television (see Greenclaws) and for her own Musical Mystery Tour series of albums for children. In 2011 she co-wrote (with Mayor) and illustrated two children's rhyming story books for Top That! publishing.

Richard Collins is a multi-instrumentalist primarily known for his skill on the 5-string banjo. He won the UK banjo championship three years in succession and has played with many British bluegrass bands and touring American artists. He has appeared as both actor and musician with The Royal Shakespeare Company and is a trained piano tuner and restorer.

== Albums ==
- Mandolinquents (1997)
- Dance of the Comedians (2007) – live album
