= Gates of Eden =

Gates of Eden may refer to:

== Films and literature ==
- Gates of Eden: American Culture in the Sixties, 1977 book by Morris Dickstein
- Gates of Eden (short story collection), a collection of short stories written by Ethan Coen
- The Gates of Eden, a 1916 silent film

== Music ==
- "Gates of Eden" (song), a 1965 Bob Dylan song
- Gates of Eden (album), a 2006 album by Ralph McTell
- "Gates of Eden", a 2019 song by Nebula from the album Holy Shit
