= Streets... =

Studio album by Ralph McTell
- Released: 1975
- Recorded: 1974
- Studio: Nova Sound Studios, London; Air Studios, London
- Genre: Folk, folk rock, country blues
- Length: 39:54
- Label: Warner Bros.
- Producer: Ralph McTell

Ralph McTell chronology
Easy (1974)	Streets... (1975)	Right Side Up (1976)

Streets... is an album by British folk musician Ralph McTell. It was McTell's most successful album, entering the UK album chart on 15 February 1975 and remaining there for twelve weeks. It opens with McTell's hit single, "Streets of London".

== Track listing ==
All titles by Ralph McTell except * Traditional; arranged by Ralph McTell.

Side one

1. "Streets of London" - 4:24
2. "You Make Me Feel Good" - 3:20
3. "Grande Affaire" - 3:40
4. "Seeds of Heaven" - 3:15
5. "El Progresso" - 3:37

Side two

1. "Red Apple Juice" * - 4:20
2. "Heron Song" - 3:30
3. "Pity the Boy" - 3:35
4. "Interest on the Loan" - 3:13
5. "Jenny Taylor/Je N'Étais Là" - 3:40
6. "Lunar Lullaby" - 3:20

== Charts ==
Chart (1975)	Peak position
Australia (Kent Music Report)	90

== Personnel ==
- Ralph McTell - guitars, piano, accordion, harmonica, marimba, vocals
- Pete Berryman - lead guitars, rhythm guitar
- Jerry Donahue - lead guitar
- Mike Piggott - guitar, fiddle, violin
- Rod Clements - bass
- Dave Pegg - bass
- Danny Thompson - double bass
- Rabbit Bundrick - piano
- Rod Edwards - piano
- Danny Lane - drums, percussion
- Bob Kerr - saxophone, horns
- Sandy Spencer - cello
- Alan "Madswitcher" Harris - Jew's harp
- Andrew Cronshaw - zither
- Prelude - backing vocals (as The Goldrushers)
- Maddy Prior - soprano vocals on "Lunar Lullaby"
- Graham Preskett - strings arrangement

== Production credits ==
- Producer: Ralph McTell
- Executive producer: Bruce May
- Engineers: Richard Dodd, Stephen Allen, Pete Swettenham and Ralph McTell
- Sleeve design: Graves Aslett
- Cover photography: Roy Cuthbert

== Awards and accolades ==
- "Streets..." reached number 13 in the UK Album Chart in February, 1975.
- "Streets..." was awarded a Silver disc for record sales in May, 1975.

== Release history ==
Country	Date	Label	Format	Catalogue	Notes
United Kingdom	1975	Warner Bros.	LP	K56105	
Australia	1975	EMI	LP	EMA312	
Canada	1975	20th Century	LP	9209-486	
Germany	1975	Warner Bros.	LP	WB56105Z	
Spain	1975	Polydor	LP	2310402	
United States	1975	20th Century	LP	T-486	
United States	1979	Kicking Mule	LP	KM307	Released as "Streets of London".
United Kingdom	1995	Leola	CD	TPGCD12	This CD release has two bonus tracks.
Germany	1999	Repertoire	CD	REP4764-WG	This CD release has one bonus track.

== Track variations ==
The UK 1995 CD release includes two bonus tracks:

- "Country Boys" (McTell) - from the original "Streets..." recording sessions
- "Another Star Ascending (The Boxer)" (McTell) - recorded in 1976.

The German 1999 CD release has one bonus track:

- "Summer Lightning" (McTell) - from the album "Easy" and the B-side of the "Streets of London" single.
