= Simon Mayor =

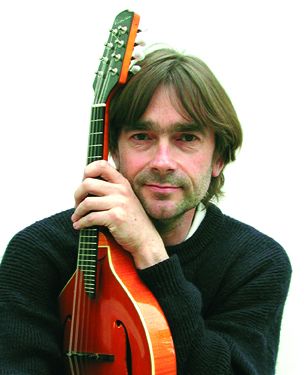
- Mayor with Vanden signature model mandolin

Background information
- Born: Simon Mayor; 1953 (age 72–73); Sheffield, Yorkshire, England
- Genres: Folk, classical
- Occupations: Musician, songwriter, record producer
- Instruments: Mandolin, mandola, mandocello, guitar, violin, ukulele
- Years active: 1976–present
- Label: Acoustics Records
- Website: www.mandolin.co.uk

Simon Mayor (born 1953) is an English mandolinist, fiddle player, guitarist, composer and humorist. He is noted for a series of instrumental albums featuring the mandolin, live performances with his partner Hilary James and his groups The Mandolinquents and Slim Panatella & the Mellow Virginians, and (with Hilary James) for writing and performing for children.

He has produced a series of instructional books and DVDs for the mandolin,. He is also a regular columnist for Acoustic magazine, along with Martin Taylor, Doyle Dykes, Gordon Giltrap, Maartin Allcock and Julie Ellison.

== Career ==
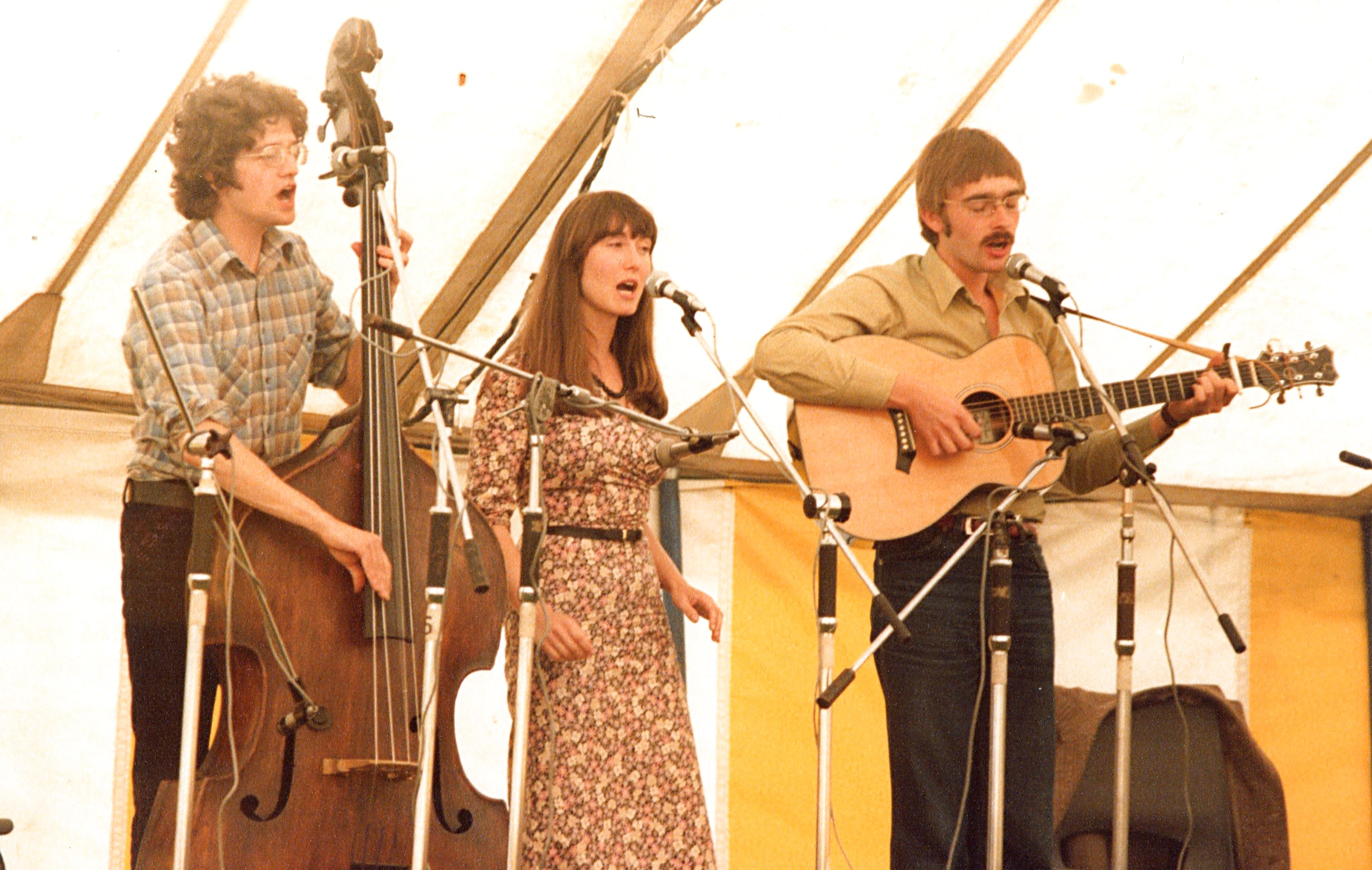
Mayor (at right, on guitar) with Phil Fentimen and Hilary James as "Spredthick" at the 1980 Towersey Festival

Mayor cites fiddler and mandolinist Dave Swarbrick as a teenage musical influence, after being taught to sing in tonic sol-fa by his father when very young. With his solo debut The Mandolin Album in 1990 he embarked on a series of recordings with the stated aim of giving the mandolin a uniquely British voice. The CD was made Recording of the Week on BBC Radio 2. His mix of original and traditional material alongside classical pieces has been noted by BBC World Service (Recording of the Week), Q, Cosmopolitan, Living Tradition (Scotland) and Sing Out! (U.S).

In May 2000 he entered the UK's Classical Artist Top Ten with Mandolin Moods, a 'best of' release of his own compositions and classical works on Universal Records.

His touring schedule has included the Rudolstadt International Folk Festival, Shetland Folk Festival, Vancouver Folk Festival, The Stephen Leacock Humour Festival (Canada), Cheltenham Literature Festival (England), Edinburgh Fringe (Scotland), The Classical Mandolin Society of America and others.

He leads Britain's first modern mandolin quartet, the Mandolinquents. The quartet emerged from a 1997 line up, The Mandolin All-stars with multi-instrumentalists Maartin Allcock and Chris Leslie of Fairport Convention, and longtime musical partner, Hilary James. The Mandolinquents now includes the classical guitarist Gerald Garcia, multi-instrumentalist Richard Collins, and James on mandobass and vocals.

He played swing fiddle on the album for the show Five Guys Named Moe, and plays fiddle with his occasional trio Slim Panatella & the Mellow Virginians.

Mayor and James have also written satirical and topical songs for BBC news programmes including Newsnight. An admirer of fellow Yorkshireman the late Jake Thackray, Mayor occasionally performs a special programme of Thackray's songs.

== Youth audience ==
Mayor tours regularly with James. The duo have worked extensively with young people, mostly in theatres and schools, and have written over fifty children's songs, many for their own Musical Mystery Tour children's CDs, and the Musical Mystery Tour songbook, which was published by Faber Music.

Their work had featured widely on the BBC. For six years, they were regular hosts of BBC School Radio's The Song Tree. They also wrote for, and on occasion presented, BBC's Play School, The Listening Corner and Play Days. In addition, Mayor worked as multi-instrumental session musician for other BBC radio programmes Singing Together, Music Workshop and Time and Tune.

Their songs have been used extensively in education, including English language teaching courses for Danish schoolchildren.

In 2011, Top That! Publishing published I'm A Parrot and Gobble! Gobble! Gobble!, two children's illustrated rhyming story books, using the lyrics from two Mayor/James songs, and with drawings by Hilary James.

Alongside their other websites, they set up Childrensmusic.co.uk in 1999.

== Albums ==
=== Solo ===
- The Mandolin Album (1990)
- The Second Mandolin Album (1991)
- Winter With Mandolins (1992)
- The English Mandolin (1995)
- New Celtic Mandolin (1998)
- Music From A Small Island (2006)
- The Art of Mandolin (2014)
- Carolan - Fantasias on themes by Turlough O'Carolan (2023)

=== With Hilary James ===
- Duos - live - (2001)
- Lullabies With Mandolins (2004)
- When Summer comes Again (2021)

=== Mandolinquents ===
- Mandolinquents (1997)
- Dance of the Comedians - live - (2007)

=== Musical Mystery Tour series ===
(with Hilary James - for children)

- Gobble! Gobble! Gobble! (2000)
- Up in a Big Balloon (2000)
- A Big Surprise (2000)
- Snowmen & Kings (2000)
- Midsummer Market (2000)

=== As featured musician with Hilary James ===
- Burning Sun (1993)
- Love Lust & Loss (1996)
- Bluesy (1999)
- Laughing with the Moon (2004)
- English Sketches (2011)
- You Don't Know (2015)

=== Miscellaneous ===
- The Working Party (1993)
- Slim Panatella & the Mellow Virginians (1994)
- Mandolin Moods (2000) compilation issued by Universal Records

== Books ==
- The Mandolin Tutor (1995)
- New Celtic Mandolin (1998)
- The New Mandolin (2000)
- Mastering The Mandolin (2003)
- Great Tunes For Mandolin (vol 1) (2015)
- Great Tunes For Mandolin (vol 2) (2015)
- Great Traditional Tunes For Guitar (2015)
- Of Death and a Banana Skin (2018)

== DVDs ==
- Mandolin Essentials (1997)
- New Celtic Mandolin (1997)
