= Maartin Allcock =

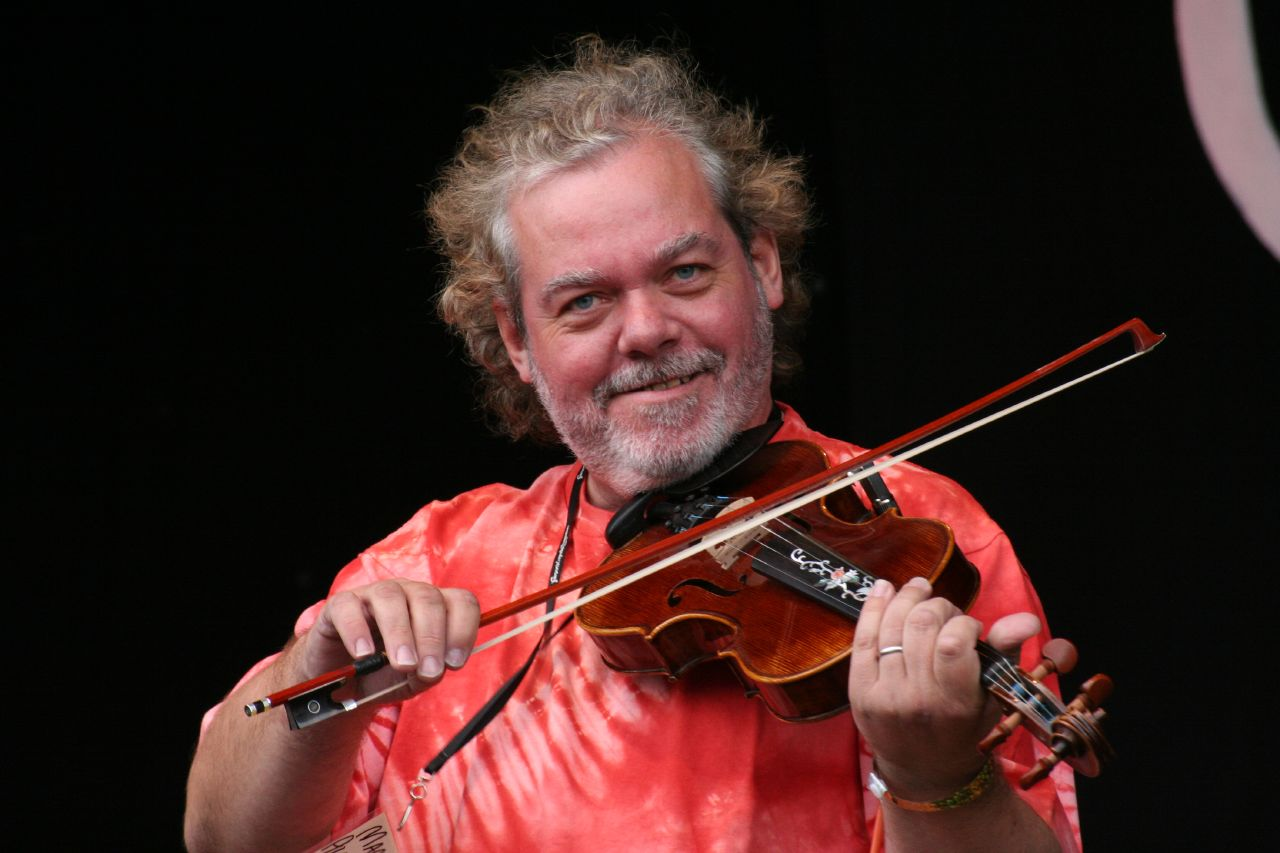
- Allcock with Swarb's Lazarus; Cropredy Festival, 12 August 2006

Background information
- Also known as: Martin Allcock
- Born: 5 January 1957; Middleton, England
- Died: 16 September 2018 (aged 61)
- Genres: Celtic folk; rock; folk rock
- Occupations: Musician; multi-instrumentalist; record producer
- Instruments: Guitar; keyboards; violin; bass guitar; pipes; vocals
- Years active: 1976–2018
- Formerly of: Fairport Convention; Jethro Tull; Swarb's Lazarus

Maartin Allcock (born Martin Allcock; 5 January 1957 – 16 September 2018) was an English multi-instrumentalist and record producer.

== Biography ==
Born in Middleton, Lancashire (now Greater Manchester), England, Allcock studied music at Huddersfield and Leeds. He began playing professionally in January 1976, playing in dance bands and folk clubs. His first tour was in 1977 with Mike Harding as one of the Brown Ale Cowboys. He went to Brittany in 1978, for a temporary stay, but ended up remaining longer than intended, and learned to cook while there. On returning to Manchester he studied and qualified to become a chef, working in the Shetland Islands in 1980.

In 1981 he joined the Bully Wee Band, a Celtic folk group, which led to an 11-year stint as lead guitarist with British folk rock band Fairport Convention from October 1985 to December 1996, and concurrently four years as keyboardist with rock band Jethro Tull from January 1988 to December 1991. In summer 1991 he also played keyboards for The Mission. From the early 2000s he began working freelance from his home on the west coast of Snowdonia as a session man and record producer with the Welsh language Sain record label.

In 2018, he announced on his web-site that he had been diagnosed with liver cancer and would make his final live performance at the year's Cropredy Festival before retirement. Fairport Convention played the festival on 11 August. Allcock died on 16 September 2018, aged 61.

== Session work and production ==
Allcock's session career included more than 200 albums, including Robert Plant, Beverley Craven, Judith Durham, Breton guitarist Dan Ar Braz (six albums), Ralph McTell, Dave Swarbrick, Cat Stevens, and Dafydd Iwan. He began producing Welsh music in 2005 and has produced ten albums for Sain Records in Caernarfon. He was UK bass guitarist and tour manager for Nashville songwriter Beth Nielsen Chapman.

== Selected discography ==
=== Solo albums ===
- MAART (1990)
- OX15 (1999)
- Serving Suggestion (2004)
- Chilli Morning (2012)

=== With Fairport Convention ===
- Here Live Tonight (Australia; 1986)
- Expletive Delighted (1986)
- More Live Tonight (Australia; 1986)
- Cropredy Capers (Video; 1987)
- Meet On The Ledge (1987)
- The Other Boot (1987)
- In Real Time (Live '87)
- In Real Time (Video; 1987)
- The Third Leg Woodworm (1988)
- Red & Gold (1989)
- The Five Seasons (1991)
- Legends (Video; 1991)
- 25th Anniversary Live (2CDs; 1992)
- Jewel In The Crown Woodworm (1995)
- Old.New.Borrowed.Blue (1996)

=== Other collaborations ===
- Ralph McTell, Bridge of Sighs (1987)
- Simon Nicol, "Before Your Time" (1987)
- Jethro Tull, "Rock Island" (1989)
- Ralph McTell, "Love Songs"(1989)
- Kieran Halpin, "Crystal Ball Gazing" (1989)
- Beverley Craven, "Beverley Craven" (1990)
- Steve Ashley, "Mysterious Ways" (1990)
- Dan Ar Braz, "Songs" (1990)
- Dan Ar Braz, "Frontieres de Sel" (1991)
- Kieran Halpin, "Mission Street" (1991)
- Jethro Tull, "In Concert" (1991, released 1995)
- Ralph McTell, "Silver Celebration" (1992)
- Ralph McTell, "The Boy With The Note" (1992)
- Dan Ar Braz, "Les Îles de la Memoire" (1992)
- Dan Ar Braz, "Rêve de Siam" (1992)
- Dan Ar Braz, "Xavier Grall" (1992)
- Simon Nicol, "Consonant Please Carol" (1992)
- Robert Plant, "Fate Of Nations" (1993)
- Ralph McTell, "Alphabet Zoo" (1993)
- Beverley Craven, "Love Scenes" (1993)
- Beth Nielsen Chapman, "Beth Nielsen Chapman" (2nd Album) (1993)
- Les Barker, "Gnus and Roses" (1994)
- Ralph McTell, "Slide Away The Screen" (1994)
- Dan Ar Braz, "Theme For The Green Lands" (1994)
- Ashley Hutchings, "Twangin' 'n' a-Traddin'" (1994)
- Ashley Hutchings, "The Guv'nor's Big Birthday Bash" (1995)
- Billy Connolly, "Musical Tour Of Scotland" (1995)
- Judith Durham, "Mona Lisas" (1996)
- Mandolin Allstars, "1st album" (1996)
- Steve Tilston/Maggie Boyle, "All Under the Sun" (1996)
- Chris Leslie, "The Flow" (1997)
- The Simon Mayor Quintet, "Mandolinquents" (1997)
- WAZ!, "WAZ!" (1998)
- Dave Pegg And Friends, "Birthday Party" (1998)
- Steve Gibbons, "The Dylan Project" (1998)
- WAZ!, "Fully Chromatic" (1999)
- David Hughes, "Recognised" (2000)
- Ralph McTell, Red Sky (2000)
- "Hope & Glory" (Soundtrack) (2000)
- Sally Barker, "Another Train" (2000)
- Emily Slade, "Shire Boy" (2001)
- Kieran Halpin, "Back Smiling Again" (2002)
- Alistair Russell, "A19" (2002)
- John Wright, "Dangerous Times" (2002)
- Swarb's Lazarus, “Live and Kicking” (2006)
- Mike Billington, "Sol Invictus" (2013)
- The Bar-Steward Sons of Val Doonican, "Jump Ararnd" (2013)
- The Bar-Steward Sons of Val Doonican, "The Devil Went Darn To Barnsley" (2014)
- The Bar-Steward Sons of Val Doonican, "I'm Glad It's Not Black Friday Every Day" (2015)
- The Bar-Steward Sons of Val Doonican, "Merry Xmas Everybody" (2016)
- Scott Doonican & Dave Burland, "Wake Up, Little Suzie" (2016)
- The Bar-Steward Sons of Val Doonican, "I Believe In Father Christmas" (2017)
- Lisa Starnini, "Two Bays - Due Baie" (2019)

As a record producer:

- Ralph McTell, Sand in Your Shoes (1995)
- The Bar-Steward Sons of Val Doonican, "The Devil Went Darn To Barnsley" (2014)
- The Bar-Steward Sons of Val Doonican, "I'm Glad It's Not Black Friday Every Day" (2015)
- The Bar-Steward Sons of Val Doonican, "Merry Xmas Everybody" (2016)
- Scott Doonican & Dave Burland, "Wake Up, Little Suzie" (2016)
- The Bar-Steward Sons of Val Doonican, "I Believe In Father Christmas" (2017)
