= Tickle on the Tum =

UK children's TV series (1984–1988)

- Starring: Ralph McTell
- Country of origin: United Kingdom
- Original language: English
- No. of series: 5
- No. of episodes: 118

Production
- Running time: 10 mins

Original release
- Network: ITV
- Release: 5 November 1984 – 29 November 1988

Tickle on the Tum is a series of ten-minute programmes for young children produced by Granada Television and aired on the ITV network from 5 November 1984 until 29 November 1988. The series was set in the General Store and Post Office in the fictional village of Tickle-on-the-Tum (the humorous double-meaning of the title was explained obliquely in the theme song). The original presenters were folk-singer Ralph McTell, fresh from his stint on Granada's other children's series Alphabet Zoo, and Danusia Harwood.

From about the middle of the second series, Harwood was replaced by Jacqueline Reddin. In the final series, the setting changed to the newly opened Tickle Broadcasting Corporation (TBC) studios. Reddin became the show's lead presenter and sang the theme song, after McTell returned to his recording career. She was joined by a puppet cat named Dexter, performed by John Eccleston. In this series, Jacqueline occasionally appeared as another character, movie star 'Gloria Glamorous'.

== Format ==
Ralph and Danny (or Jacqui depending which series you were in) would be working in the shop when a local resident would come in and recount at length an incident in their week, accompanied with illustrations by Valerie Pye. A song, written and sung with guitar (and occasionally, piano) by McTell, would follow based around either the week's story or simply the visiting character. The three of them would also read aloud jokes from the 'Tickle Post', which were usually credited to have been submitted by children from various schools.

Pet-shop proprietor Bunny was played by Nerys Hughes, McTell's co-presenter on Alphabet Zoo and several songs from the earlier series were reused in Tickle on the Tum, including "Kenny the Kangaroo" and "Ollie the Otter". Favourite characters amongst children were bumbling odd-job man Barney Bodger, Mike the Milkman and G.P. Dr Dimple, played by Bill Oddie.

When Danny was working at the shop, it was implied that she was just an assistant and Ralph was the proprietor. But during the Christmas Special from series 3, Ralph is shown returning from a music tour and mentions that the shop belongs to Jacqui now. Despite being twice as long as a regular episode, the Christmas special didn't feature any guests stars at all, but did feature an uncredited cameo by Jacqueline Reddin's baby daughter Jenna (as Farmer Field's youngest).

The original opening credit sequence, illustrated by Valerie Pye, featured several town inhabitants standing in front of the General Store. They were, from left to right: Farmer Field, Roland Crust, Lilly Lolly, Bobby Bins and Barney Bodger. When Billy Connolly (who played Bobby Bins) left after just two episodes, his character was replaced by the similar Tommy Tidy, played by Willie Rushton. Tommy's outfit was almost identical to that of Bobby, making it seem that the drawn figure in the opening credits represented Tommy Tidy instead of Bobby Bins.

== Cast and characters ==
Sources:

- Gary Ball (Tickle Rovers football team captain) – Brian Bovell (2 episodes, series 2–3)
- Barney Bodger (builder) – Tim Healy (13 episodes, series 1 to 4)
- Bessie Bagwash (launderette owner) – Mollie Sugden (9 episodes, series 2 to 4)
- Bobby Binns (dustman) – Billy Connolly (2 episodes, series 1–2)
- Bunny Brown (pet shop owner) – Nerys Hughes (4 episodes, series 2–3)
- Connie Caper (WPC) – Joan Sims (8 episodes, series 1–3)
- Mayor Choudhury (town mayor) – Zia Mohyeddin (4 episodes, series 4)
- Mrs. Cravat – Barbara Lott (4 episodes, series 4)
- Miss Dibbs (scout leader) – Patricia Brake (5 episodes, series 4)
- Dora (school bus driver) – Penelope Keith (8 episodes, series 1 to 3)
- Dr Dimple – Bill Oddie (12 episodes, series 1 to 4)
- Farmer Field – John Wells (10 episodes, series 1 to 4)
- Freddy the Fireman – Graham Stark (6 episodes, series 2 to 4)
- Lily Lolly (Lollipop Lady) – Bertice Reading (2 episodes, series 1–2)
- Mickey Moon (newspaper boy) – Adam Sunderland (2 episodes, series 2)
- Mike the Milkman – Kenny Lynch (4 episodes, series 1–2)
- Miss Marker (teacher) – Susan Wooldridge (7 episodes, series 1 to 3)
- Roland Crust (baker) – Billy Dainty (3 episodes, series 1–2)
- Tommy Tidy (dustman/inventor) – Willie Rushton (2 episodes, series 3)
- Winnie Walker (postwoman) – Madge Hindle (4 episodes, series 1–2)
- Willie Wok (chip shop owner) – Burt Kwouk (2 episodes, series 3)

== Series guide ==
- Series 1: 18 editions 5 November 1984 – 1 April 1985
- Series 2: 31 editions 2 September 1985 – 23 June 1986
- Series 3: 30 editions 1 September 1986 – 30 March 1987 (Including one 25 minute Christmas special)
- Series 4: 26 editions 8 February 1988 – 22 August 1988
- Series 5: 13 editions 6 September 1988 – 29 November 1988

Although broadcast over 4 series, there were three main recording blocks of 39 episodes overseen by three different directors. The first 39 episodes, directed by Patricia Pearson, starred Ralph and Danny and made up all the episodes of series one and the first 21 of series two. This is why some episodes broadcast in early 1986 still bore a 1984 date during the end credits. After a few weeks of reruns, the second series resumed with ten new episodes from the second recording block, now co-starring Jacqui and directed by Peter Plummer. Series three featured all the remaining episodes from the second block and series four all the episodes from the third block, starring Jacqui and Dexter and directed by Richard Signy.

== Merchandise ==
The complete first series has been released on DVD on 23 August 2010, albeit with a warning from the BBFC that it contained "outdated racial attitudes". However, instead of featuring the entire first series (as advertised on the cover), the DVD features 17 episodes from the first production block which broadcasts were spread out over the first and second series. Only five different guest actors appear on the DVD: Miss Marker, Mike the Milkman, Dr. Dimple, Roland Crust and Dora the Driver, whereas series one as broadcast also featured Barny Bodger, Bobby Binns, Winnie Walker, Connie Caper, Lilly Lolly and Farmer Field.
