= You Well-Meaning Brought Me Here =

Studio album by Ralph McTell
- Released: 1971
- Recorded: 1971
- Studio: Trident Studios, Air Studios, London
- Genre: Folk, folk rock
- Length: 42:57
- Label: Famous
- Producer: Gus Dudgeon

Ralph McTell chronology
Revisited (1970)	You Well-Meaning Brought Me Here (1971)	Not Till Tomorrow (1972)

Professional ratings
Review scores
Source	Rating
Allmusic	5/5 stars
Christgau's Record Guide	B+ (US edition)

You Well-Meaning Brought Me Here is the 1971 album by British folk musician Ralph McTell. The album was produced by Gus Dudgeon, who also produced Elton John's early albums. McTell was now managed by Jo Lustig but still living with his young family in a council flat in Croydon.

== Track listing (UK) ==
All tracks composed by Ralph McTell

Side one

1. "Genesis I Verse 20" – 4:28
2. "First and Last Man" – 3:35
3. "In Some Way I Loved You" – 2:54
4. "Lay Your Money Down" – 2:48
5. "Old Brown Dog" – 4:25
6. "Pick Up a Gun" – 4:19

Side two

1. "You Well-Meaning Brought Me Here" – 3:15
2. "Chalkdust" – 3:15
3. "The Ballad of Dancing Doreen" – 3:08
4. "Claudia" – 3:46
5. "The Ferryman" – 7:04

== Track listing (US) ==
All tracks composed by Ralph McTell

1. "Genesis I Verse 20" – 4:28
2. "First and Last Man" – 3:35
3. "In Some Way I Loved You" – 2:54
4. "Lay Your Money Down" – 2:48
5. "Old Brown Dog" – 4:25
6. "Pick Up a Gun" – 4:19
7. "You Well-Meaning Brought Me Here" – 3:15
8. "Streets Of London" – 4:30
9. "The Ballad of Dancing Doreen" – 3:08
10. "Claudia" – 3:46
11. "The Ferryman" – 7:04

== Charts ==
Chart (1972)	Peak position
Australia (Kent Music Report)	34

== Personnel ==
- Ralph McTell – acoustic guitar, piano, Moog synthesizer, harmonica, harmonium, flute, lead vocals
- Rick Wakeman – organ, piano
- Davey Johnstone – mandolin on "Old Brown Dog"
- Johnny Van Derek – violin on "In Some Way I Loved You"
- Caleb Quaye – electric guitar
- Danny Thompson – double bass
- Steve Bonnett – electric bass
- Roger Pope – drums
- Mike Vickers – Moog synthesizer on "Genesis I Verse 20"
- Gus Dudgeon – backing vocals
- Sheila Dudgeon – backing vocals
- Barry St. John, Christine Holmes, Judith Powell, Liza Strike – backing vocals on "Claudia"
- Tony Visconti – arranger, conductor on "The Ballad of Dancing Doreen" and "Claudia"
- Robert Kirby – arranger, conductor on "Pick Up a Gun" and "The Ferryman"

== Production ==
- Producer: Gus Dudgeon
- Recording Engineers: Robin Geoffrey Cable, Alan Harris
- Photography: Michael Joseph
- Liner notes: Ian Pollock

== Release history ==
Country	Date	Label	Format	Catalogue	Notes
United Kingdom	1971	Famous	LP	SFMA5753	
United States	1971	Paramount	LP	PAS6015	For the US release, a re-recorded version of "Streets of London" replaced "Chalkdust"
Australia	1971	Interfusion/ Paramount	LP	L-34,373/ SPML934373	With 'US' track listing
Canada	1971	Paramount	LP	PAS6015	With 'US' track listing
Germany	1971	Famous	LP	1C062-93098D	With 'US' track listing
New Zealand	1971	Paramount	LP	SPML934373	With 'US' track listing
Holland	1972	Paramount	LP	PQ20056	Released as "Streets of London" with 'US' track listing
Japan		Paramount	LP	SWG-7554	With 'US' track listing but different running order
United Kingdom	1975	ABC	LP	ABCL5084	
United Kingdom	1981	Mays	LP	TG001	Released as "1971–72"
United Kingdom	1987	Mays	LP	TPG001	Released as "The Ferryman"
United Kingdom	1998	Leola	CD	TPGCD14	
