= Bridge of Sighs (Ralph McTell album) =

Studio album by Ralph McTell
- Released: 12 January 1987
- Length: 46:58
- Label: Mays Records

Ralph McTell chronology
The Best of – Tickle on the Tum (1986)	Bridge of Sighs (1987)	The Very Best of Ralph McTell (1988)

Bridge of Sighs is a studio album by English singer-songwriter Ralph McTell. It was released by Mays Records on 12 January 1987. It was reissued on CD by Leola Music in 2007.

Speaking of the album, McTell told The Canberra Times in 1987: "The themes follow the Ralph McTell thread. It's a little bit offbeat and I don't think there are so many songs about alienation. There are stronger links throughout the album than on my earlier albums, which tended to be diverse."

== Critical reception ==
Professional ratings
Review scores
Source	Rating
The Virgin Encyclopedia of 70s Music	3/4 stars

Upon its release, Mark Kearns of the Hayes & Harlington Gazette commented: "McTell has a pleasant voice and uses it effectively on these twelve new songs. No surprises, but a meritorious effort with some very nice backing." At the end of 1987, The Age included the album under their "The best sounds of 1987" list. The newspaper commented: "A dozen appealing originals by the troubadour of London's streets, in a classy production helped by the cream of British folk-rock musicians."

== Track listing ==
All tracks are written by Ralph McTell

No.	Title	Length
1.	"Throw out a Line and Dream"	4:16
2.	"Mr Connaughton"	3:46
3.	"The Girl from the Hiring Fair"	4:50
4.	"Choufleur"	2:57
5.	"Something the Matter with Mary"	3:31
6.	"Bridge of Sighs"	5:01
7.	"The Setting"	5:23
8.	"Little Actress"	3:58
9.	"Bad Girl"	3:25
10.	"Holiday Romance"	3:03
11.	"Dreams of You"	3:12
12.	"Words I Couldn't Say"	3:36

== Personnel ==
- Ralph McTell - vocals (tracks 1–12), acoustic guitar (tracks 1–11), synth (track 11), piano (track 12)
- Alun Davies - rhythm guitar (tracks 1, 3–10)
- Maartin Allcock - bass (tracks 1, 3–4, 9, 11)
- Gerry Conway - drums (tracks 1, 3–6, 8–12)
- Jerry Donahue - lead guitar (tracks 1, 8–9)
- Graham Preskett - keyboards (tracks 1, 3–4, 6–8, 10–12), strings (tracks 1, 3–4, 6–8, 10–12), violin (track 3)
- Benny Gallagher - backing vocals (tracks 1, 4, 9, 11–12)
- Simon Nicol - rhythm guitar (track 2)
- Dave Swarbrick - violin (track 2)
- Richard Thompson - lead guitar (tracks 3, 6)
- Geraint Watkins - accordion (tracks 4, 9)
- Dave Pegg - bass (tracks 5–7, 10)
- Sam Mitchell - steel guitar (track 5)
- Frank Keane - uilleann pipes (track 7)
- Danny Thompson - double bass (tracks 8, 12)
- Brian Robson - piano (track 12)

Production

- Ralph McTell - producer
- Martin Levan, Mark Frith, Roger T. Wade, Brian Robson - engineers

Other

- Jan Leman - cover illustration, design
