= Right Side Up =

Studio album by Ralph McTell
- Released: 1976
- Studio: Air Studios, London
- Genre: Folk
- Length: 35:54
- Label: Warner Bros. Records/WEA
- Producer: Ralph McTell, Peter Swettenham

Ralph McTell chronology
Streets... (1975)	Right Side Up (1976)	Ralph, Albert & Sydney (1977)

Right Side Up is an album by Ralph McTell released in 1976 by Warner Bros. Records/WEA, recorded at Air Studios in London by Pete Henderson and Mike Stavrou, and produced by Ralph McTell and Peter Swettenham (one-time member of band Grapefruit).

Musicians who appear on the album include Danny Thompson, (double bass), John Stevens and Pick Withers - (drums) - Rod Clements (of Lindisfarne), - Dave Pegg (from Fairport Convention), bass players. Backing vocals were provided by Tony Rivers - of The Castaways - Ken Gold and John Perry (also one-time member of band Grapefruit). John Martyn played guitar on "River Rising".

== Track listing ==
All tracks composed by Ralph McTell; except where indicated

Side one

1. "San Diego Serenade" (Tom Waits) - 2:45
2. "Naomi" - 3:07
3. "Tequila Sunset" - 3:22
4. "Weather the Storm" - 4:01
5. "River Rising" - 3:57

Side Two

1. "From Clare to Here" - 4:13
2. "Chairman and the Little Man" - 2:09
3. "Country Boys" - 2:32
4. "Slow Burning Companion" - 3:28
5. "Nightmares" - 2:55
6. "May You Never" (John Martyn) - 3:25
1. "Song for Ireland" (additional track, learnt by McTell from the version by Dick Gaughan, written by Phil Colclough originally released in 1982, added to re-release of the album)

== Track notes ==
1. "San Diego Serenade": McTell - "I've always admired Tom Waits writing for both his melody and his wonderfully evocative lyrics."
2. "Weather the Storm":McTell - "It remains one of my most requested pieces in live work."
3. "From Clare to Here": McTell - "A chance remark from a fellow building site labourer remembered from 1963 as " it's a long way from Clare to here."
4. "Country Boys": McTell: "Cornwall was in my mind when I wrote this, and Ry Cooder was on everybody's turntable."
5. "May You Never": McTell - "John Martyn has written so many beautiful songs, but I guess this is still my favourite."

== Personnel ==
- Ralph McTell - vocals, acoustic guitar
- John Martyn - electric guitar on "River Rising"
- Dave Pegg, Rod Clements - bass guitar
- Danny Thompson - acoustic bass
- Sam Mitchell - dobro
- Graham Preskett - keyboards, string arrangements
- Peter Swettenham - keyboards
- John Stevens, Pick Withers - drums, percussion
- John Perry, Ken Gold, Tony Rivers - backing vocals

Technical

- Mike Stavrou, Peter Henderson - mixing
- Mike Dymond - photography
