= Hilary James =

British musician

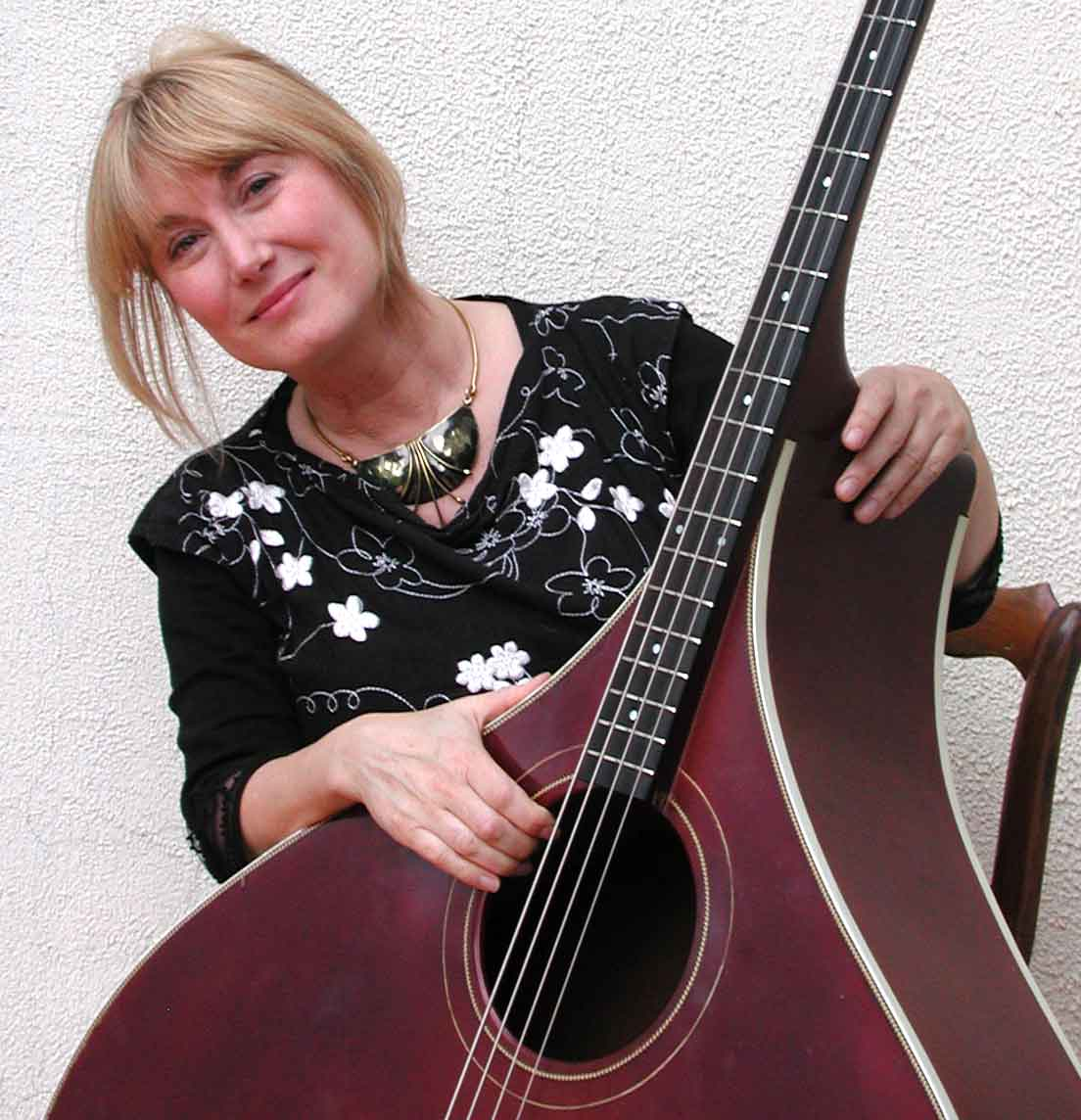
- James with her mandobass

Background information
- Born: Stoke-on-Trent, Staffordshire, England
- Genres: Folk, Classical, Blues, Swing
- Occupations: Musician, songwriter, artist
- Instruments: Vocals, mandobass, double bass, guitar
- Years active: 1976–present
- Label: Acoustics Records
- Website: www.folksong.co.uk

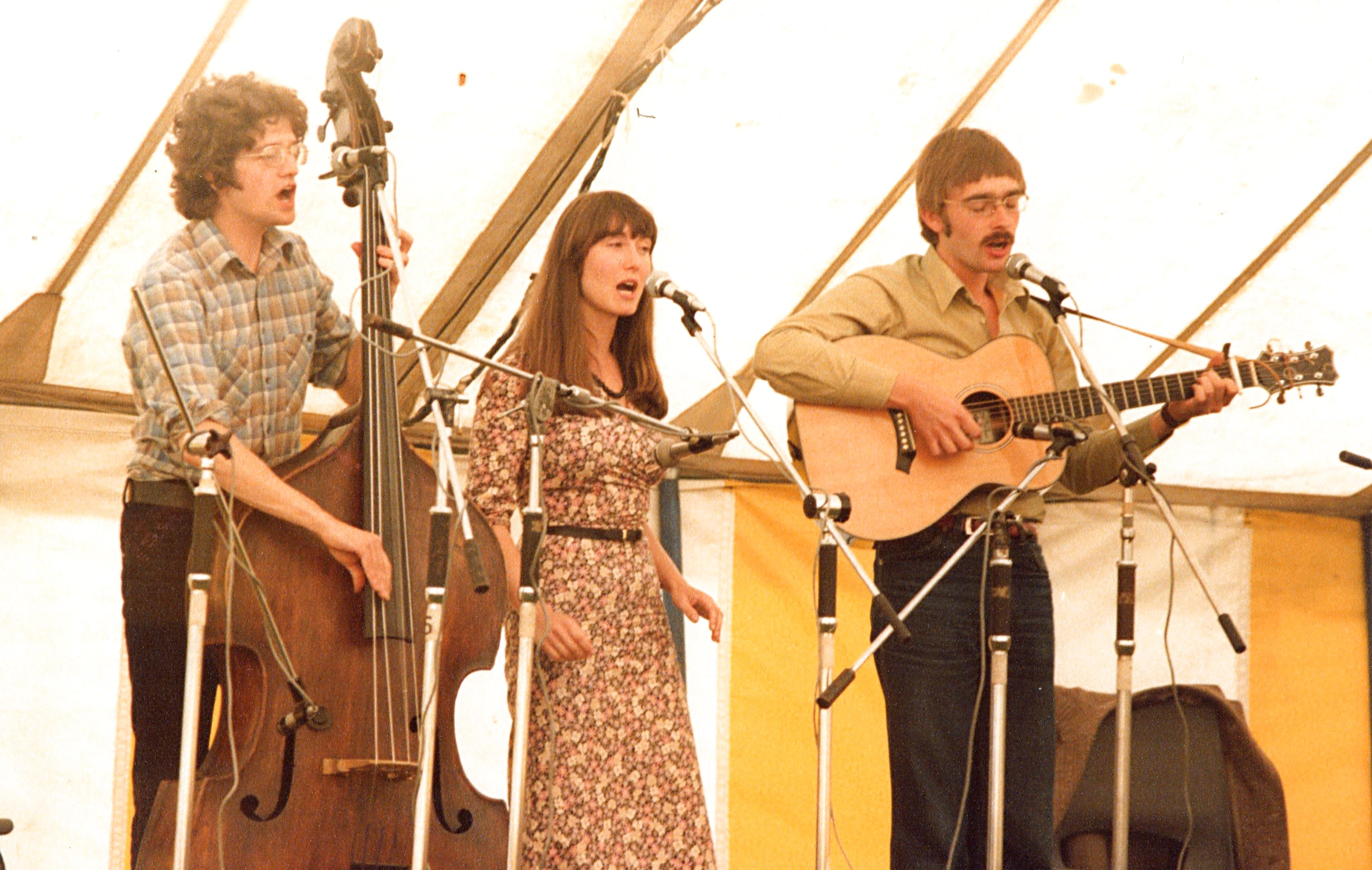
James (centre) with "Spredthick" at the 1980 Towersey Festival

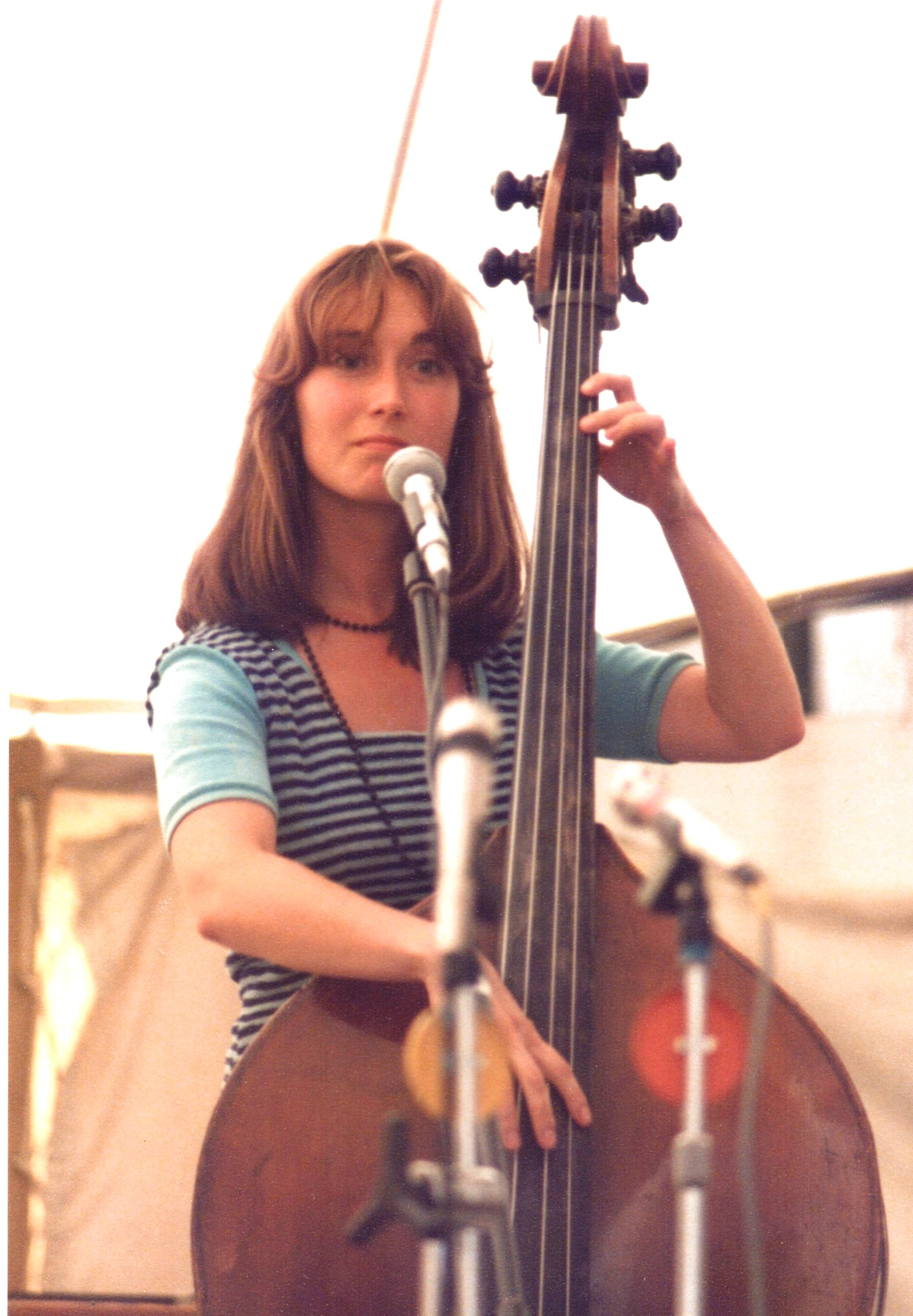
Hilary James (double bass) at the 1980 Towersey Festival

Hilary James is a British musician. A vocalist and multi-instrumentalist, she plays guitar, double bass, mandobass (bass mandolin) and is a singer, and songwriter. She works mostly with her partner Simon Mayor and with their ensemble the Mandolinquents. Mayor and James originally toured as the duo "Spredthick".

== Discography ==
=== Hilary James – solo ===
- Burning Sun (1993)
- Love, Lust and Loss (1996)
- Bluesy (1999)
- Laughing with the Moon (2004)
- English Sketches (2011)
- You Don't Know (2015)

=== Slim Panatella and the Mellow Virginians ===
Slim Panatella and the Mellow Virginians comprised : Hilary James, Simon Mayor and Andy Baum

- Sweet Nicotina (vinyl single) (1988)
- Slim Panatella and the Mellow Virginians ON CD (2001)

=== Collaboration (for children) ===
The Collaboration (for children) comprised : Hilary James and Simon Mayor

- Lullabies with Mandolins (2004)
- Children's Favourites from Acoustics (2005)
- Gobble! Gobble! Gobble! – Musical Mystery Tour vol 1 (2000)
- Up in a Big Balloon – Musical Mystery Tour vol 2 (2000)
- A BIg Surprise – Musical Mystery Tour vol 3 (2000)
- Snowmen & Kings – Musical Mystery Tour vol 4 (2000)
- Midsummer Market – Musical Mystery Tour vol 5 (2000)

=== Collaboration (for adults) Mandolinquents ===
- Dance of the Comedians (2007)
- Mandolinquents (1997)

=== Collaboration (for adults) – Simon Mayor and Hilary James ===
- The English Mandolin (2006)
- Duos (2001)

=== Simon Mayor (with Hilary James) ===
- Music from a Small Island (2006)
- The Art of Mandolin (2014)
