= From Clare to Here =

Ballad by Ralph McTell

"From Clare to Here" is a ballad about Irish emigration written by Ralph McTell. It has also been recorded by The Furey Brothers & Davey Arthur on the 1977 album Emigrant; by Nanci Griffith and Pete Cummins on the 1993 album Other Voices, Other Rooms; as a b-side by Duke Special on the 2006 single Last Night I Nearly Died; and by Ben Glover on his 2016 album The Emigrant.

McTell's original version appears on his 1976 album Right Side Up. In the sleeve notes of the remaster, he wryly describes it as his "second most covered song".

== Background ==
In 1963, McTell was working on a building site, and it is of this time that he wrote, in the mid-1970s, "From Clare to Here". "There was an Irish gang on the site, and the craic, as they call it, relieved the stress of the hard work. I was working with an Irishman called Michael, as so many of them are. And I said to him, 'It must be very strange to be here in London after the place you come from.' And he responded by saying, 'Yes, it's a long way from Clare to here.'"
