= Not till Tomorrow =

Studio album by Ralph McTell
- Released: November 1972
- Recorded: 1972
- Studios: Sound Techniques, Chelsea, London
- Genres: Folk, folk rock, country blues
- Length: 45:51
- Label: Warner Bros. / Reprise
- Producer: Tony Visconti

Ralph McTell chronology
You Well-Meaning Brought Me Here (1971)	Not till Tomorrow (1972)	Easy (1974)

Professional ratings
Review scores
Source	Rating
Allmusic	4.5/5 stars

Not till Tomorrow is the 1972 album by British Folk musician Ralph McTell. Produced by Tony Visconti, it was McTell's fifth album to be released (aside from the remixed compilation Revisited) – and first album to chart – in the UK; and his third album to be released in the U.S. Ralph had been phoned and asked if he had decided on a title for the album and, wishing to give himself another day to come up with a title, responded "Not till tomorrow" which was misunderstood to be the name he had given to the album. By the time the mistake was found it was too late.

"Sylvia" was a tribute to Sylvia Plath and was recorded in a single take. "When I Was a Cowboy" used, in homage, the opening lines of Lead Belly's "Out on the Western Plains". "First Song" was the first song that McTell wrote the words first and "Barges" was the first tune that he could trace to another composer, Edvard Grieg in this instance.

== Commercial performance ==
Not till Tomorrow reached number 36 in the UK Album Chart soon after its release in November 1972.

== Track listing ==
All tracks composed by Ralph McTell.

Side one

1. "Zimmerman Blues" – 3:50
2. "First Song" – 2:39
3. "When I Was a Cowboy" – 4:00
4. "Nettle Wine" – 2:28
5. "Sylvia" – 3:40
6. "Birdman" – 6:10

Side two

1. "Barges" – 4:28
2. "Standing Down in New York Town" – 3:58
3. "Another Rain Has Fallen" – 3:57
4. "This Time of Night" – 4:27
5. "Gypsy" – 6:14

== Personnel ==
- Ralph McTell – guitar, piano, organ, harmonica, lead vocals
- Tony Visconti – sitar, organ, recorder, backing vocals
- Mary Hopkin – backing vocals (credited as Mary Visconti)
- Danny Thompson – double bass
- Laurie Allan – percussion

Production

- Tony Visconti – producer
- Alan Harris – engineer
- Victor Gamm – recording engineer
- Seabrook/Graves/Aslett – sleeve art direction
- Kelvin McGowan – photography

== Release history ==
Country	Date	Label	Format	Catalogue	Notes
United Kingdom	1972	Reprise	LP	K44210	
United States	1973	Reprise	LP	MS2121	
Canada	1973	Reprise	LP	MS2121	
New Zealand	1973	Reprise	LP	RS2121	
Germany	1975	Midi	LP	MID26030F	Released as "Star Collection"
Japan		Reprise	LP	P-8307R	
United Kingdom	1998	Leola	CD	TPGCD15	
