= Easy (Ralph McTell album) =

Studio album by Ralph McTell
- Released: March 1974
- Recorded: 1974
- Studios: John Kongos Studio, Mortlake, London; Marquee Studios, London
- Genres: Folk, folk rock, country blues
- Length: 31:04
- Label: Reprise
- Producers: Ralph McTell, Danny Thompson, Tony Visconti

Ralph McTell chronology
Not till Tomorrow (1972)	Easy (1974)	Streets... (1975)

Professional ratings
Review scores
Source	Rating
Allmusic	4.5/5 stars

Easy is the 1974 album by British Folk musician Ralph McTell. Guest musicians include folk pioneers Wizz Jones, Bert Jansch and Danny Thompson from Pentangle; Gerry Conway from Fotheringay; and Dave Mattacks from Fairport Convention. McTell started writing for the album at a friend's cottage in a tiny hamlet near the village of St Ewe, Cornwall. He fell in love with Cornwall and purchased a derelict cottage which he made habitable and still possessed 30 years later.

Things were going well with the recording until Tony Visconti's manager tried to get McTell to sign with his “Rare Earth” production company. McTell's manager was his brother, Bruce, who thought it a bad idea, which resulted in Visconti being taken off the record. Danny Thompson and McTell finished the production. The cover painting was by Enrica Y Auque Serra. It was one of a pair of popular Victorian prints popularly known as "Morning" and "Evening".

== Track listing ==
All tracks composed by Ralph McTell

Side one

1. "Take It Easy" - 2:32
2. "Maddy Dances" - 2:15
3. "Maginot Waltz" - 3:24
4. "Sweet Mystery" - 2:32
5. "Stuff No More" - 3:15

Side two

1. "Run Johnny Run" - 4:15
2. "Zig Zag Line" - 3:40
3. "Let Me Down Easy" - 3:13
4. "Would I Lie to You?" - 3:20
5. "Summer Lightning" - 2:38

== Personnel ==
- Ralph McTell - acoustic guitars (1–10), lead vocals (1–10), banjos (7), harmonium (3), harmonica (5, 7)
- Wizz Jones - guitar (1)
- Bert Jansch - guitar (6)
- Danny Thompson - double bass (1–2, 4–6, 8–10), bass drum (5), hi-hat (5)
- Steve Bonnett - mandolin (1, 2)
- Mike Piggott - fiddle (4)
- Lynsey Scott - fiddle (1)
- Dave Mattacks - drums (1, 2)
- Gerry Conway - drums (4, 6, 9)
- Michael Bennett - backing vocals (1)
- John Kongos - backing vocals (6)

== Production ==
- Producers: Ralph McTell, Danny Thompson and Tony Visconti
- Recording Engineers: Phil Dunne, John Kongos, Mike Noble, Victor Gamm and Tony Visconti
- John Ashcroft - art direction, typography
- Enrica Y Auque Serra - cover painting

== Awards and accolades ==
- "Easy" reached number 31 in the UK Album Chart soon after its release in March, 1974.
- "Easy" was awarded a Silver disc for record sales in August, 1976.

== Release history ==
Country	Date	Label	Format	Catalogue	Notes
United Kingdom	1974	Reprise	LP	K54013	
United States	1978	Kicking Mule	LP	KM303	The US release has a revised running order.
United Kingdom	1999	Leola	CD	TPGCD17	The CD release has two bonus tracks.

== Track variations ==
The UK 1999 CD release includes two bonus tracks taken from a single released in 1972:

- "Teacher Teacher" (Ralph McTell)
- "Truckin' Little Baby" (Blind Boy Fuller)
