= Dreams of You =

Single by Ralph McTell
- B-side: "Sweet Forgiveness (Seeds of Heaven)"
- Released: 21 November 1975
- Length: 2:53
- Label: Warner Bros.
- Songwriter(s): Johann Sebastian Bach; Ralph McTell
- Producer(s): Ralph McTell

Ralph McTell singles chronology
"Let Me Down Easy" (1975)	"Dreams of You" (1975)	"Weather the Storm" (1976)

"Dreams of You" is a song by English singer-songwriter Ralph McTell, released on 21 November 1975 as a non-album single. The song peaked at number 36 in the UK Singles Chart.

McTell later re-recorded the song for his 1987 album Bridge of Sighs.

== Background ==
Inspired by Johann Sebastian Bach's "Jesu, Joy of Man's Desiring", both Bach and McTell are credited as the writers of "Dreams of You". McTell told Sounds in 1975, "I'm proud of this new song. At least if it's not a hit the blame is only 50% mine, 'cause I nicked the tune. It's one of those tunes you find yourself singing. They used to play it at school assemblies, 'Jesu, Joy of Man's Desiring'. It's a love song that brings back memories of someone far away."

McTell wrote and recorded "Dreams of You" within a two-week period after returning from the United States, where he had taken a short break from the music industry. Upon his return to Britain, his record company, Warner Bros., suggested releasing McTell's version of "Let Me Down Easy" as his next single. McTell opted for something new instead and soon wrote "Dreams of You", which he described at the time as "one of the quickest songs I've ever written". Warner received the song with enthusiasm and it was released as a single on 21 November 1975. It peaked at number 36 in the UK Singles Chart, giving McTell his second and final UK top 40 hit.

In a 1976 interview with Sounds, McTell spoke of his refusal to perform the song live, "I've never done it on stage because there's no room to breathe. When we recorded it, I stopped and restarted the tape between verses. When people ask for it on stage, I just have to say 'sorry'."

== Critical reception ==
Upon its release, Ray Fox-Cumming of Record Mirror & Disc commented, "It's all very pleasant and in excellent taste, but I can't help feeling that if he'd hammed it up a bit, he'd have had a better chance of getting a hit." The Shepherds Bush Gazette & Hammersmith Post noted that the song "captures all that is good about Ralph McTell: gentle melody, soothing vocals and pretty lyrics", but felt the tune is "one that takes some time to grow on you and for this reason, the record may get lost in the Christmas rush".

== Track listing ==
7-inch single (UK, Germany, Netherlands, Norway and Australia)

1. "Dreams of You" – 2:53
2. "Sweet Forgiveness (Seeds of Heaven)" – 3:15

== Personnel ==
Production

- Ralph McTell – production
- Stephen Allen – engineering ("Dreams of You")
- Peter Swettenham – engineering ("Sweet Forgiveness")

== Charts ==
Chart (1975)	Peak position
Netherlands (Tipparade)	18
UK Singles (OCC)	36
