= Sand in Your Shoes =

Studio album by Ralph McTell
- Released: 1995
- Length: 67:47
- Label: Transatlantic (UK); Red House (US)
- Producer: Ralph McTell; Maartin Allcock

Ralph McTell chronology
The Boy with a Note (1992)	Sand in Your Shoes (1995)	Songs for Six Strings Vol II (1996)

Sand in Your Shoes is a studio album by English singer-songwriter Ralph McTell. It was released in the UK in 1995 by Transatlantic Records and received a US release in 1998 through Red House Records.

== Critical reception ==
Professional ratings
Review scores
Source	Rating
AllMusic	4/5 stars
The Virgin Encyclopedia of 70s Music	3/4 stars

Upon its release, Michael Ruby of No Depression commented, "Standout tracks here, such as 'Tous Les Animaux Sont Tristes', 'Peppers and Tomatoes' and 'I Don't Think About You', find McTell doing what he does best: telling unique stories from unique viewpoints." Clark Collis of The Daily Telegraph wrote, "Few easy singalongs emerge, but the album offers further evidence of McTell's reflective strengths. Three decades after his 'Streets of London', a song called 'Care in the Community' highlights one of the social issues troubling him now." William Ruhlmann of AllMusic described the album as a "full, expansive collection of songs that makes a worthy addition to the singer/songwriter's catalog". He added, "Sand in Your Shoes finds McTell over 50 and reflecting philosophically on the passage of time, the approach of death, and several social concerns. The overall tone of the collection is elegiac, the songs full of loss and regret."

== Track listing ==
All tracks are written by Ralph McTell except "The Islands" by McTell and Maartin Allcock, and "The Case of Otto Schwarzkopf" by Schnuel Huppert, McTell and Allcock

No.	Title	Length
1.	"Tous Les Animaux Sont Tristes"	5:23
2.	"The Islands"	4:32
3.	"Fear of Flying"	4:03
4.	"Care in the Community"	6:10
5.	"I Don't Think About You"	3:55
6.	"Enemy Within (The Band)"	4:32
7.	"Sand in Your Shoes"	3:44
8.	"Jesus Wept"	6:04
9.	"After Rain"	4:03
10.	"Peppers and Tomatoes"	5:36
11.	"The Case of Otto Schwartzkopf"	4:52
12.	"Daddy's Whistling Home"	4:58
13.	"Still in Dreams"	4:32
14.	"An Irish Blessing"	5:23

== Personnel ==
- Ralph McTell - vocals, guitar, harmonica, keyboards
- Maartin Allcock - accordion, arranger, bouz, drums, guitars, bass, keyboards, mandolin, uilleann pipes, background vocals
- Alun Davies - guitar
- Jerry Donahue - electric guitar
- Graham Preskett - piano, arranger
- Chris Leslie - fiddle, viola, violin, violone
- Frank Gallagher - fiddle, whistle
- Philip Todd - clarinet, saxophone
- Guy Barker - trumpet
- Chris Laurence, Dave Pegg - bass
- Gerry Conway, Ralph Salmins - drums
- Patric Molard - sampling
- Mary Hopkin - vocals
- Leah May, Phil Beer, Rebecca Moncur, Steve Knightley - background vocals

Production

- Ralph McTell, Maartin Allcock - producers
- Mark Frith, Tim Matyear, Mark Tucker - engineers
- Nick Watson - mastering

Other

- Hugh Gilmour, Eric Peltoniemi - design
- David Lieberman, Mike Smallcombe - photography
