= Red Sky (Ralph McTell album) =

Studio album by Ralph McTell
- Released: 2000
- Length: 74:03
- Label: Leola Music
- Producer: Ralph McTell

Ralph McTell chronology
Travelling Man (1999)	Red Sky (2000)	National Treasure (2002)

Red Sky is a studio album by English singer-songwriter Ralph McTell, released in 2000 by Leola Music.

== Critical reception ==
Professional ratings
Review scores
Source	Rating
AllMusic	2.5/5 stars
The Virgin Encyclopedia of 70s Music	3/4 stars

Upon its release, Rob Beattie of Q described Red Sky as "an album far more substantial than could have been expected". He added: "At 75 minutes there are still a few horrors, but there's also plenty of the fine, observational balladry for which he made his name. The result is McTell's best record for 25 years." In 2005, Helen Wright of musicOMH considered Red Sky "a lovely album for quiet listening". She wrote: "The tracks on Red Sky span a wider spectrum than the very English folk-rock sound that marked his early career, but the songs reflecting that heritage are the most successful. The excursions into other styles are sometimes triumphant, sometimes best not mentioned."

== Track listing ==
All tracks are written by Ralph McTell except "Raining in My Heart" by Felice Bryant and Boudleaux Bryant

No.	Title	Length
1.	"Up"	2:41
2.	"Wagon on the Motorway"	4:28
3.	"In the Dreamtime"	3:44
4.	"One Day Away from You"	3:14
5.	"Lost Boys"	2:17
6.	"Bicker and Rue"	2:58
7.	"Now This Has Started"	4:18
8.	"Easter Lilies"	3:54
9.	"Raining in My Heart"	2:52
10.	"Icarus Survived the Fall"	3:07
11.	"Saucers (Aquamarine)"	2:40
12.	"When Love Has Gone"	2:11
13.	"Let Me Fly or Let Me Fall"	2:50
14.	"I Suppose"	3:23
15.	"I Love Driving West"	3:19
16.	"I'm Not Really Blue"	3:34
17.	"Fin"	4:44
18.	"I'll Keep This with Mine (Leaving 'Liggan Woods)"	5:05
19.	"Red Sky at Night"	11:04
