= Ralph McTell =

English singer-songwriter and guitar player (born 1944)

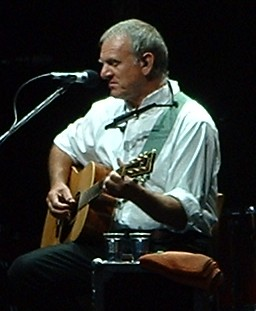
- McTell at the Eden Project in August 2003

Background information
- Born: Ralph May; 3 December 1944 (age 81); Farnborough, Kent, England
- Origin: Croydon, Greater London, England
- Genres: Folk; country blues
- Occupations: Singer; songwriter; record producer; author; radio and TV presenter; poet
- Instruments: Guitar; vocals; piano; harmonica
- Years active: 1965–present
- Labels: Transatlantic; Famous; Warner Bros.; Mays; Castle; Leola
- Website: ralphmctell.co.uk

Ralph McTell (born Ralph May; 3 December 1944) is an English singer-songwriter and guitar player who has been an influential figure on the UK folk music scene since the 1960s. McTell is best known for his song "Streets of London" (1969), which has been covered by more than two hundred artists around the world.

McTell modelled his guitar style on American country blues guitar players of the early 20th century, including Blind Blake, Robert Johnson and Blind Willie McTell. These influences led a friend to suggest his professional surname. An accomplished performer on piano and harmonica as well as guitar, McTell issued his first album in 1968 and found acclaim on the folk circuit. He reached his greatest commercial success in 1974 when a new recording of "Streets of London" became a No. 2 hit on the UK Singles Chart.

In the 1980s, he wrote and played songs for two children's television programmes, Alphabet Zoo, which also featured Nerys Hughes, followed by Tickle on the Tum, featuring Jaqui Reddin. He also recorded Keith Hopwood's and Malcolm Rowe's theme song to Cosgrove Hall's adaptation of The Wind in the Willows.

== Biography ==
McTell's mother, Winifred (née Moss), was born in Hammersmith, London. During the Second World War she was living in Banbury, Oxfordshire, with her sister Olive when she met Frank May. They married in 1943 while Frank was home on leave from the army. Winifred moved to Croydon, Surrey, and McTell was born on 3 December 1944 in Farnborough, Kent. He was named after Ralph Vaughan Williams – Frank had worked as the composer's gardener before the war. A second son, Bruce, was born in 1946. Frank was demobilised, but after a year or so at home, he walked out on his family in 1947.

Winifred was left to support herself and bring up the boys unaided. She told McTell's biographer, "I remember Ralph saying to me quite soon after Frank left us, 'I'll look after you, Mummy'. I guess he'd got used to Frank being away all his short life." But despite their father's desertion and the consequent poverty, Ralph and Bruce May had a happy and fulfilled childhood in Croydon.

McTell's love of music surfaced early. He was given a plastic mouth organ and his grandfather, who played the harmonica, taught and encouraged him. The brothers spent many contented summer holidays at Banbury with their uncle and aunt and their grandparents. Banbury and north Oxfordshire figured throughout McTell's life. Later, he recalled those childhood summers in his song "Barges".

=== Influences ===
Other childhood experiences shaped McTell's songwriting. A young Irishman and his family were the Mays' upstairs neighbours. Needing a father figure, McTell greatly valued the young man's friendship, which later inspired the song "Mr. Connaughton". Similarly, "Mrs Adlam's Angels" recalls his Sunday school teacher: "I loved the ceremonial and the music," he says, "you can hear the influence of hymn tunes in my song structures."

In 1952, two youths attempted to break into a Croydon warehouse: one, Derek Bentley, surrendered to the police but the other, sixteen-year-old Christopher Craig, shot and killed a police officer. Yet at the trial, Bentley was sentenced to death. "My mum knew the Bentleys," McTell recalls. "I was about eight, but even then I could see the horror and injustice of executing a teenager for a murder he didn't commit." Many years later, McTell expressed that sense of injustice in the song "Bentley & Craig".

=== Teens ===
After passing his 11-plus school examination, McTell attended the John Ruskin Grammar School. He hated his time there, and despite being a very bright pupil, he did not do well academically. Many of his fellow pupils were from wealthier backgrounds, and though having many school friends, he felt he didn't fit in.

Musically, his tastes tended towards being an outsider as well. He was captivated by skiffle and American rock'n'roll. Acquiring an old ukulele and a copy of The George Formby Method, he played his first chord. He later recalled, "I was thunderstruck – it was like magic!" Soon, he mastered skiffle classics such as "Don't You Rock Me, Daddy-O", and by his second year at school, he formed a skiffle band.

By the age of 15, McTell was very anxious to leave grammar school and the British Army looked like a way out, so in 1959 he enlisted in the Junior Leaders Battalion of The Queen's Surrey Regiment. Army life proved far worse than school. After six months, he bought himself out and resumed his education at technical college, passing several O level exams and an A level exam in art.

In 1963, McTell was working on a building site, and it is of this time that he wrote, in the mid-1970s, "From Clare to Here". "There was an Irish gang on the site, and the craic, as they call it, relieved the stress of the hard work. I was working with an Irishman called Michael, as so many of them are. And I said to him, 'It must be very strange to be here in London after the place you come from.' And he responded by saying, 'Yes, it's a long way from Clare to here.'"

=== Discovering African American music ===
At college, McTell became interested in the beatnik culture that flourished in the 1950s and early 1960s. Besides reading the works of writers such as Jack Kerouac and Allen Ginsberg, he discovered African American music – jazz, blues and R&B. Inspired by musicians such as Jesse Fuller, Ramblin' Jack Elliott, Robert Johnson and Muddy Waters, he bought a guitar and practiced assiduously.

He and a group of like-minded friends became habitués of London's Soho jazz clubs and regularly went down to Brighton to "...sit on the beach looking windswept and interesting," as McTell put it. Soon he was spending much of his time away from Croydon, supporting himself with temporary work in factories, laundries and hotels.

During his travels, McTell met musicians who were destined to remain lifelong friends, among them Jacqui McShee (later to gain fame in the band Pentangle), Martin Carthy and Wizz Jones. He was persuaded to join a bluegrass-influenced band called the Hickory Nuts, who performed all over England and, despite playing in some dire places for pin money early on, ended up with decent fees and respectable crowds in venues such as Croydon's Fairfield Halls.

=== Busking ===
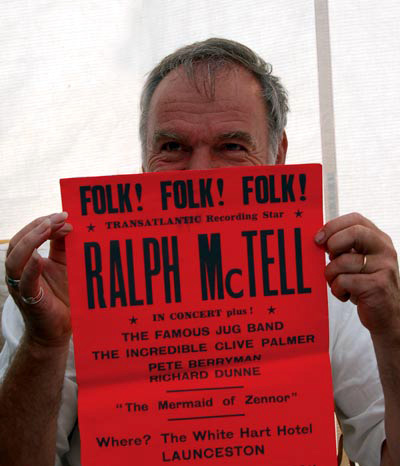
McTell photographed in 2006 holding a poster advertising a late-1960s concert in Launceston

By now, McTell had begun travelling abroad, busking around Europe with his guitar. He spent time in France and visited Belgium and Germany. Other trips took him to Italy and through Yugoslavia ("I felt a madness there, even then") to Greece.

Paris was a city that McTell revisited frequently. Late in 1965 he and a friend from Croydon took a room in a cheap hotel on the Left Bank, earning their rent by busking cinema queues. After braving a bitterly cold Paris winter, McTell met a young American, Gary Petersen, who had studied with the guitarist Reverend Gary Davis. "There was a great anticipation every time I got to play with (Petersen)", McTell recalled. "Each time I learned something new, and through him I learned how to play ragtime properly."

In 1966, McTell met another émigré to Paris, a student from Norway named Nanna Stein. The pair soon became inseparable. Back in England, they lived in a caravan in Cornwall. McTell and Wizz Jones were regular performers on the Cornish circuit, especially at The Folk Cottage in Mitchell. It was Jones who suggested the stage name "McTell", "after Blind Willie McTell, whose 'Statesboro Blues' we both loved".

Cornwall captured McTell's heart – a place whose "unique spirit got to me" – and the county has always remained a place for him to retreat to. By the end of 1966, he and Stein were expecting their first child. They married on 30 November in Norway and returned to live in Croydon with Winifred. Their son, Sam, was born on 21 January 1967.

After an unrewarding spell at teacher training college, McTell decided he had to try to make it full-time in music. As well as his vocal and instrumental talents, he was developing as a songwriter and was in demand in folk clubs and festivals.

=== Record deal ===
During 1967, McTell landed a deal with Transatlantic Records and by the end of the year was recording his first album. Arranged by Tony Visconti and produced by Gus Dudgeon, the album, Eight Frames a Second, was released early in 1968. It came to the attention of the BBC and was featured on radio programmes including Country Meets Folk in August and John Peel's Top Gear. The release of the album meant more live work so McTell's brother Bruce became his manager and booking agent.

His second album Spiral Staircase, recorded for Transatlantic in late 1968, included the first recording of "Streets of London", which was recorded in one take by McTell on guitar and vocals.

The third album, My Side of Your Window, released in 1969, became Melody Maker magazine's Folk Album of the Month. In July, McTell had appeared at Cambridge Folk Festival for the first time and at the end of the year headlined at Hornsey Town Hall.

=== Into the 1970s ===
By 1970, "I'd got a family," McTell recalled in an interview, "and found I had a musical career, somehow." He was getting extensive radio play, and the audiences at his concerts were growing.

By May, he was sufficiently successful to fill the Royal Festival Hall in London. In August, McTell played the huge Isle of Wight Festival alongside Jimi Hendrix, Joan Baez, and Leonard Cohen.

Bruce May had bowed out and McTell was now being managed by impresario Jo Lustig. In October 1970, McTell sold out the Royal Festival Hall again and the album Revisited was released. This remixed compilation was originally intended to introduce McTell to American record-buyers but was released in the UK. It has still not been released on cd, even though all the other Transatlantic albums have been remastered.

Ralph and Nanna's daughter Leah was born on 9 February 1971.

You Well-Meaning Brought Me Here was released on the Famous label in 1971. Among the highlights of this fourth studio album was "The Ferryman", inspired by the Hermann Hesse book Siddhartha. That year also saw McTell's first tour in the United States.

Initially, Paramount Records had been McTell's American label but had not been supportive, and he later signed with Warner Bros. Records. While in the US, McTell hung out with the British folk-rock band Fairport Convention, establishing a lifelong professional relationship as well as personal friendships.

Paramount put a new recording of "Streets of London" on the US release of You Well-Meaning Brought Me Here, and, in April 1972, issued it as a single in the Netherlands, where it charted, climbing slowly to No. 9 in May.

McTell's fifth album, Not Till Tomorrow, was produced by Tony Visconti, and released on Reprise in 1972. His UK concert tour played to packed houses and he met one of his guitar heroes, the Rev Gary Davis. By the end of the year, he'd parted company with Jo Lustig and his brother Bruce was again managing his career.

Although living in Putney, southwest London, Ralph and Nanna bought a derelict cottage in Cornwall during 1972.

=== The Royal Albert Hall ===
During 1973, McTell undertook two major tours. The spring tour culminated in a sell-out concert at London's Royal Festival Hall on 5 May, whilst the winter tour was completed in front of a full house at London's Royal Albert Hall on 30 January 1974. By the end of the year, McTell was in the studio with Visconti again working on his next album. Released early in 1974, Easy won critical acclaim. It was promoted by lengthy tours of Britain and Europe with Danny Thompson and Mike Piggott as backing musicians. Despite the civil unrest and violence in Northern Ireland, the tour included concerts in the province – in fact, McTell continued to play there regularly throughout 'the Troubles'.

=== 'Streets of London' and the band ===
McTell re-recorded "Streets of London" with bassist Rod Clements and backing vocalists Prelude. Released as a single (recorded on the Reprise label) on 7 December 1974, it rocketed up the charts to No. 2 in the first week of 1975, became a worldwide million-seller, and won McTell the Ivor Novello Award.

In early 1975, McTell released the album Streets..., which sold strongly and spent twelve weeks in the album charts. Backing musicians on the album included Lindisfarne's Rod Clements, Fairport Convention's Dave Pegg and Jerry Donahue, and Maddy Prior from Steeleye Span, who inspired McTell to write the song "Maddy Dances". He decided to tour with a band to promote the album, but the experiment was not a success. That tour, he recalls, "became a nightmare." It was time for a break. McTell went to America with his family where he spent time relaxing and writing. Refreshed, he returned to the UK. His single "Dreams of You", released in November 1975, reached number 36 in the UK charts.

During 1976, McTell topped the bill at Montreux Jazz Festival and played another sold-out concert at The Royal Albert Hall. This was followed by his first tour of Australia and the far east. At McTell's insistence, local buskers were given free tickets for the flagship concert at Sydney Opera House.

Ralph and Nanna's son Tom was born on 7 September 1976.

McTell's eighth album, Right Side Up, was released late in 1976 and the year ended with a packed-out Christmas concert in Belfast where he got standing ovations both before and after the show.

The concerts at the Royal Albert Hall and Sydney Opera House had both been recorded and in 1977, Warner Bros. Records released the live album Ralph, Albert and Sydney.

During the year, McTell met John 'Jonah' Jones, a popular figure on London's music scene. It was the start of a close friendship that lasted until John's death in 2003. After tours in the US and Britain, McTell again appeared at Cambridge Folk Festival.

=== Quieter times ===
Ralph and Nanna's son Billy was born on 19 April 1978. Professionally, it was a quieter year and Ralph spent time with his family in their homes in London and Cornwall.

In March 1979, McTell played The Royal Festival Hall accompanied by Dave Pegg and Dave Mattacks of Fairport Convention, and Nigel Smith and Mike Piggott.

McTell had written a number of new songs and went into the studio with backing musicians including Richard Thompson, Dave Pegg and Simon Nicol. The resulting album, Slide Away The Screen was released by Warner Bros. Records.

The recording contract with Warner Bros. Records expired in 1980 so McTell and Bruce May set up Mays Records as an 'own brand' label. It would be a year or more until they had an album to release but McTell continued to tour.

During 1981, McTell, Dave Pegg, Dave Mattacks and Richard Thompson formed an impromptu band called The GPs. They performed half-a-dozen concerts but contractual restrictions meant the band could not be developed further.

The first release on Mays Records was the 1981 single "England", a song later adopted as the theme for a television travelogue presented by comedian Billy Connolly, a long-standing friend of McTell. Mays Records' first album release was Water of Dreams, which featured "Bentley & Craig", the song that led to McTell's support of the campaign to grant Derek Bentley a posthumous pardon.

=== Television ===
In 1982, McTell's career took an unexpected change of direction. Granada Television commissioned Alphabet Zoo, a series of children's programmes built around songs written and performed by McTell. Although initially reluctant to accept the offer, the fact that one of his heroes, Woody Guthrie, had composed dozens of songs for children, convinced him it was worthwhile. The first series, broadcast in 1983, was a success. A second series followed and Mays Records released two albums of the material – Songs From Alphabet Zoo and Best of Alphabet Zoo.

During 1983, McTell presented his own music series on BBC Radio 2. His guests included Billy Connolly, Georgie Fame, Simon Nicol with Dave Swarbrick, and Mike Harding.

In 1984, McTell fronted another children's TV programme, called Tickle on the Tum, again built around his songs. McTell featured in three series alongside guests including John Wells, Willie Rushton, Kenny Lynch, Penelope Keith and Nerys Hughes. Mays Records released The Best of – Tickle on the Tum in 1986. The first series was released on DVD by Revelation Films in 2010.

McTell was still playing concerts between his television commitments and he toured during 1984 at home and in Canada and the United States. After composing the music for a Skol lager advertising campaign, he decided to concentrate on his musical career and turned down further television work.

=== Commercialism ===
Bruce May negotiated a deal with Telstar Records, a company that pushed its products heavily with major advertising and hyping campaigns. McTell was persuaded to record an album that mixed his own material and 'classic songs' such as "Penny Lane", "Morning Has Broken" and "Scarborough Fair". The result, At the End of a Perfect Day, released late in 1985, was one of McTell's least satisfactory recordings. It was "a totally commercial venture and a miserable failure," he said later; "...while I was reluctant to do it, the possibility of getting the kind of back-up that Telstar were offering was too good to miss."

The next year McTell was back on form with Bridge of Sighs. Released on Mays Records in 1987, the album gathered together a lot of hitherto unfinished songs. It included "The Girl from the Hiring Fair" (originally written for Fairport Convention, and in whose core repertoire it remains to this day), and "The Setting", influenced by Seán Ó Faoláin.

=== Homage ===
As well as tours in his own right, McTell secured a prestigious support slot in 1987 opening the shows on The Everly Brothers' UK tour.

After tours in Europe, the US and Australia, McTell was back in the studio in February 1988 to record the album Blue Skies Black Heroes. Released on his own Leola Music label, the album was a homage to the blues and ragtime musicians who had so influenced his playing.

"Nearly all my guitar heroes are black, American, usually blind and most of 'em dead," McTell said. All the tracks on Blue Skies Black Heroes were recorded as live takes, four with Danny Thompson on bass. The follow-up tour that summer saw McTell on the road with a veritable arsenal of guitars.

1988 also saw the release of a compilation album, The Very Best of Ralph McTell. Issued by Start, it was McTell's first album to appear on CD.

McTell was a regular visitor to, and occasional performer at, Fairport Convention's annual music festival in the village of Cropredy, near Banbury. The location inspired him to pen the ballad "Red and Gold" about the English Civil War, which has become another staple of Fairport's repertoire.

At the end of 1988, Bruce May ceased to be McTell's manager, the post being taken by Mick McDonagh.

=== Castle compilations ===
In 1989, McTell signed a deal with the label Castle Communications to produce a compilation of his love songs. For contractual reasons, some songs had to be re-recorded in Dave Pegg's Woodworm Studio in Barford St. Michael. The resulting album, A Collection of His Love Songs, was subtitled 'Affairs of the Heart'.

To support the album's release, McTell undertook an extensive tour in the autumn and early winter. The tour was well-supported with PR material and was managed on the road by John 'Jonah' Jones.

The next year, 1990, Castle released Stealin' Back, another collection of McTell's blues and jug band numbers.

In 1991, McTell shared the billing with Donovan on a tour of Germany. He also toured in his own right in the UK.

A second Castle compilation was released in 1992 to celebrate McTell's 25 years of recording. Silver Celebration featured a selection of tracks including "The Ferryman", "From Clare to Here" and "Streets of London". A very extensive Silver Celebration tour occupied much of the year, again managed by 'Jonah' Jones.

Castle had by now obtained the rights to the Transatlantic catalogue, and released a "Best of" CD with 24 tracks from McTell's earliest albums. Castle subsequently licensed the early McTell back-catalogue to other labels, resulting in the release of several CD compilations under such titles as The Best of Ralph McTell or Streets of London.

=== The Boy with a Note ===
McTell completed a major project when in 1992, the BBC commissioned and broadcast The Boy with a Note – 'an evocation of the life of Dylan Thomas in words and music'. It was re-recorded and released on McTell's Leola label as an album. McTell is very proud of this ambitious piece. "Two or three years went into that," he said. "It's grown-up work."

During 1993, McTell toured Australia and the Far East, and back home he undertook The Black And White Tour. Road Goes on Forever Records released The Complete Alphabet Zoo, presenting the songs from the two television series in alphabetical order. McTell and Mick McDonagh parted company.

In 1994 McTell took part in a concert at the Royal Albert Hall to commemorate the life of Ken Woolard. Ken was the founder of Cambridge Folk Festival and McTell assembled a band, Good Men in the Jungle, to play at that summer's festival. He also celebrated his fiftieth year by giving up smoking.

Slide Away The Screen was released as a CD by Road Goes on Forever Records with three previously unreleased songs added.

Sand in Your Shoes was recorded at Woodworm, by now relocated in Barford St Michael near Banbury. The album came out on the Transatlantic label during 1995.

McTell performed his song "Bentley & Craig" at a special service for Derek Bentley held in Croydon cemetery with the Bentley family. Bentley's sister Iris died before he was pardoned and, at her request, McTell performed at her funeral a few years later.

In 1995 McTell performed songs from The Boy with a Note at the Year of Literature Festival in Swansea, in South Wales.

=== Tickety Boo ===
In 1996, McTell presented BBC radio's coverage of Sidmouth Festival and toured the UK, Europe, and the US.

McTell's long-standing sound engineer, Gordon 'Doon' Graham, had captured many of McTell's concert performances on the desk, and an album of live material from 1976 to 1995 was released on Leola as Songs for Six Strings Vol II.

Early in 1997, McTell began his association with Tickety Boo, the company which produced Billy Connolly's 'World Tour of...' television series. "In The Dreamtime", the song played over the closing credits to Billy Connolly's World Tour of Australia, later featured on McTell's album Red Sky.

In the same year, McTell was the subject of a major feature in The Independent newspaper. An authorised biography of McTell, entitled Streets of London, was published by Northdown Publishing. McTell's concert at Croydon Town Hall was filmed, and released on videocassette as Live at the Town Hall by Leola in 1998.

By now, Leola had taken most of McTell's management arrangements in-house. Two sell-out concerts in London's Purcell Room were recorded by McTell's tour manager and sound engineer, Donard Duffy, and released on Leola as a two-CD set. Entitled Travelling Man, the double album came out in time for McTell's 1999 spring tour. A two-page feature about McTell appeared in The Guardian newspaper in May 1999.

=== New century ===
McTell had been busy writing during the previous couple of years and the result was Red Sky. Recorded at Woodworm and released in 2000 on the Leola label, the album contained 19 listed tracks plus "Tickety-boo" as an instrumental hidden track.

McTell's output was not restricted to songs, however. He had been working on an autobiography for some years and the first volume, entitled Angel Laughter, was published by Heartland Publishing in 2000.

To promote Angel Laughter, McTell undertook a tour of bookshops and libraries.

In 2001, McTell undertook a special tour of the UK. Billed as 'The National Tour', it gave McTell a chance to present concerts featuring his newly acquired National Steel resonator guitar. Two live recordings from the National Tour made their way onto the 2002 Leola album National Treasure.

On Sunday 22 February 2002, McTell appeared to a sellout audience at Liverpool's Empire Theatre. The event was marked as a tribute to the late George Harrison who had died the previous November. The date would have been George's 59th birthday. McTell appeared alongside Steve 'Cockney Rebel' Harley, Darren Wharton (Thin Lizzy), Sir Paul McCartney and many others to raise £36,000 for the 3 main cancer charities.

Heartland published Summer Lightning, the second volume of McTell's autobiography, in 2002. Another highlight of the year was the Lifetime Achievement Award for Songwriting presented to McTell at the annual BBC Radio 2 Folk Awards. By then, McTell had written and recorded more than 200 songs.

McTell had been touring extensively at home and abroad for many years so in 2003 he decided to take a break from the road. He split the year between his London and Cornwall homes and spent the time writing, travelling and spending time with his grandchildren.

Early in 2004, McTell co-headlined on Steeleye Span's tour of Australia and New Zealand as well as touring in the UK, Ireland and continental Europe.

McTell appeared at the fortieth Cambridge Folk Festival (the performance was broadcast on BBC Four television) and also played at the fiftieth Sidmouth Festival. He made a guest appearance at Fairport's Cropredy Convention in August.

=== The Journey ===
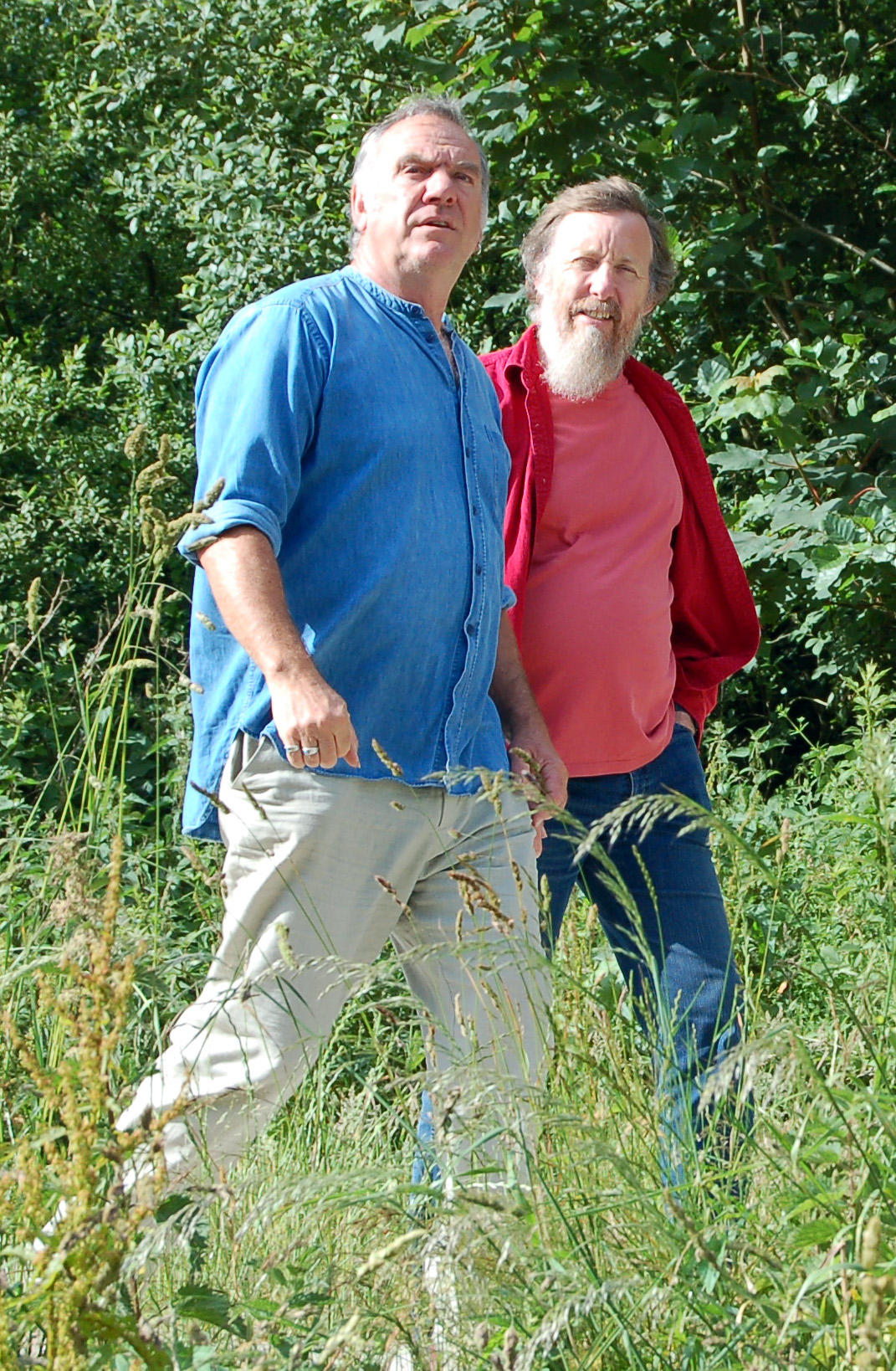
Ralph McTell (left) with David Suff of Fledg'ling who compiled and released The Journey boxed set

McTell celebrated his 60th birthday with a concert at London's Royal Festival Hall in November 2004. The entire show was filmed and released on DVD in 2005 as The London Show.

Leola published Time's Poems – The Song Lyrics of Ralph McTell towards the end of 2005. Dedicated "to Woody Guthrie, the man who started it all for me", Time's Poems contains "...all the songs I could find in notebooks, on scraps of paper and old tapes, on records and CDs".

In 2006, McTell's 'Walk Into The Morning' tour was a sellout success.

For his 'up close' tour in September 2006, McTell performed a set billed as 'Dylan, Guthrie and The Country Blues', featuring his covers of songs by Woody Guthrie, Bob Dylan and black American blues artists such as Big Bill Broonzy. He also recorded an album of the material, titled Gates of Eden. McTell described the music on this CD as "…the beginning of my own journey… these songs are almost sacred to me".

A boxed set of four CDs (accompanied by an extended essay on McTell's songs by Paul Jenkins) was released in October 2006. Compiled by David Suff from recordings made between 1965 and 2006, The Journey was promoted with several radio interviews and a major tour that included two 'gala' concerts at London's Union Chapel. The box set's packaging was designed by John Haxby, who also took the cover photograph.

A solo tour of Australia early in 2007 was followed by 'The Journey Continues' tour in the UK. In August 2007, Sanctuary Records recognised the 40th anniversary of McTell's first recording contract by re-releasing his three Transatlantic albums as CDs with bonus tracks.

=== As Far As I Can Tell ===
In October 2007, McTell released an 'audio book' titled As Far As I Can Tell. The three CDs included readings from the autobiography interspersed with new recordings of the songs they inspired. The As Far As I Can Tell treble CD was promoted by a tour that included a concert at St Mary's church in Banbury, a location that featured in the first volume of autobiography.

A compilation CD comprising McTell's own selection of songs, including the 'hit' version of "Streets of London", was released in December 2007 on the Highpoint label as The Definitive Collection.

During 2008, McTell combined the two volumes of his autobiography into a single volume under the title As Far As I Can Tell for publication to coincide with his autumn tour. The new edition featured additional chapters illustrated by photos from the May family album.

On 9 October 2008, McTell appeared on BBC1 TV's nationally broadcast magazine programme The One Show in a pre-recorded package about the song "Streets of London". The interview was filmed in Paris and conducted by Myleene Klass.

The appearance on The One Show was the springboard for two 'official' McTell internet videos. Made by Leola Music Ltd and published on YouTube, the videos featured McTell talking about his work and about "Streets of London", with concert footage shot at the Institute of Contemporary Arts.

The Institute of Contemporary Arts concert footage was released during 2008 as a full-length DVD titled McTell on The Mall.

McTell embarked on his most extensive UK tour for many years in October 2008, visiting thirty venues throughout England. The concert at Birmingham Town Hall was unusual because McTell, who rarely appears with a supporting act, shared the bill with The Dylan Project.

=== Story songs ===
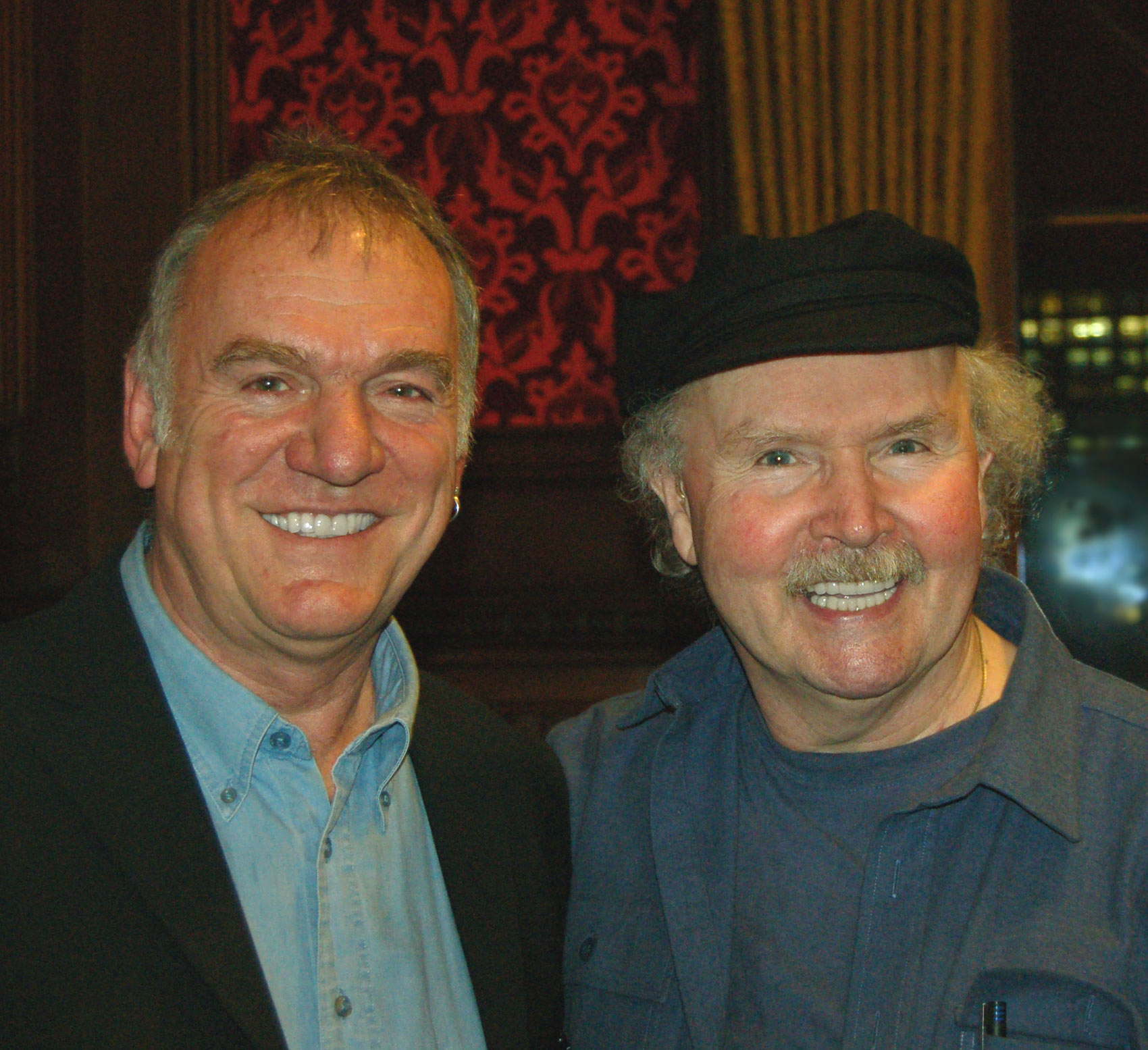
Ralph McTell (left) and Tom Paxton in the Palace of Westminster in 2007

McTell released his first downloadable album in July 2009, titled Streets of London and Other Story Songs, comprising twelve tracks from his back-catalogue.

McTell's summer 2009 festival appearances included a solo set at Fairport's Cropredy Convention on Saturday 15 August. He also joined Fairport Convention onstage during their set later the same evening.

In October 2009, McTell was honoured by the UK Parliament’s All Party Folk Music Group at a special award ceremony in the House of Commons, to celebrate his lifetime's contribution to folk music. This was only the second time such an award had been made, the previous recipient having been Tom Paxton.

In early 2010, McTell's Leola Music record label released Affairs of the Heart, a four-CD box set of love songs in a presentation package. In keeping with its theme, the album was released on Valentine's Day, 14 February. There were no previously-unrecorded songs among the fifty-six tracks on the set. Two tracks were specially re-recorded but the remaining fifty-four were digital remixes of previous recordings. Comedian Rory McGrath contributed extensive sleeve notes in the set's accompanying booklet. The sleeve design and set packaging concept were by designer Peter Thaine.

During 2010, McTell recorded an album of new songs, his first for ten years, and released in October as Somewhere Down the Road. He kept an online diary of the album’s progress which described assembling the material, the recording sessions and preparing for release. McTell’s UK autumn tour was branded with the same title.

On 21 November 2010, McTell released a seasonal song, "The Things You Wish Yourself", as a download-only single.

=== Tribute ===
McTell was invited to record his own interpretation of a Bob Dylan song for the BBC Radio 2 celebration of Dylan's 70th birthday in May 2011. Don’t Think Twice It’s Alright was also the title of McTell's own six-song tribute to Dylan, which was released as a downloadable EP.

McTell embarked on a 36-date UK autumn tour in September 2011, culminating in a concert at London's Cadogan Hall on 11 December. On the first night of the tour, McTell launched his new Songs For Six Strings boxed set.

In April and May 2012, McTell undertook a short tour of Australia. McTell's 2012 UK tour, branded “An English Heartbeat”, commenced in October, and saw the release of a CD of guitar instrumentals called Sofa Noodling. In an interview published ahead of his 2013 "One More for the Road" tour, McTell said, "It could be the last time I do a big tour... this is the beginning of slowing things down."

The spring of 2014 saw McTell touring the Celtic nations of the British Isles, and the release of a CD compilation of Celt-themed songs, Celtic Cousins. A high point of the tour was a performance of McTell's tribute to Dylan Thomas, The Boy With a Note, in Thomas's adopted home town of Laugharne in South Wales. Later in the year, McTell marked the centenary of the start of the first world war with a four-song EP, The Unknown Soldier.

McTell celebrated his 70th birthday with a concert at the Theatre Royal, Drury Lane, London, on 7 December 2014. A DVD of the concert was released in 2015.

=== About Time ===
In 2015, McTell played more than 30 solo shows over the year. Towards the end of the year, McTell started a recording project with one of his earliest performing partners, Wizz Jones. The resulting CD was released in June 2016 with the appropriate title About Time. McTell's fifty years as a recording artist was marked by Martin Guitars with a 'signature' Ralph McTell guitar, built to McTell's specification and marketed as the Martin RM50.

McTell played a special show at the Royal Albert Hall in May 2016. Billed as a 'Loyal Command Performance', the setlist was voted for by McTell's fans, and McTell performed the 20 songs that received the most votes. Summer highlights included McTell's first appearance at the Glastonbury Festival and a return to Fairport's Cropredy Convention. In the autumn McTell undertook an extensive tour of the United Kingdom and Ireland. The sixth and final CD of McTell's Songs for Six Strings boxed set was released during the tour.

== Recent work ==
During 2017, McTell and Jones toured their About Time album, which was so well received that they recorded and issued a follow-up album, About Time Too. Ahead of his solo autumn tour, McTell invited applicants to submit recordings of original music, from which McTell would select performers to open for him in an 'open mic' format at the shows. McTell then chose one act to open his London Palladium concert in October.

Since 2014, McTell had played an annual benefit concert for the UK homeless charity, Crisis at Christmas, and in 2017 McTell invited The Crisis Choir to sing "Streets of London" with him at his Palladium concert. McTell also recorded his song with The Crisis Choir and guest vocalist Annie Lennox, for release in the lead up to Christmas. The song charted at No. 94 in the UK singles chart (for downloads, CDs and streams), and at No. 1 in the Official Physical Singles Chart (for CD sales).

In September 2018, McTell made his debut on BBC's music show Later... with Jools Holland, on which he performed two songs, including the Bob Dylan-inspired "West 4th Street and Jones". In a short interview segment with Holland, McTell announced a new tour and album for 2019. The album, Hill of Beans, comprising 11 tracks including "West 4th Street and Jones", was released in September.

On 8 June 2024, McTell was a special guest for Richard Thompson, on the final night of his UK tour, at the Royal Albert Hall.

McTell appeared as a client, along with music therapist Matthew, in BBC's The Repair Shop, in April 2025, to repair a leather life-size figure of Kenny the Kangaroo, which is referenced in the Best Of Alphabet Zoo Music For Pleasure from 1983.

== Discography ==
=== Main albums released in UK ===
- Eight Frames a Second Transatlantic 1968 (LP)
- Spiral Staircase (Transatlantic LP, TRA 177, 1969)
- My Side of Your Window (Transatlantic LP, TRA 209, 1969)
- Revisited Transatlantic 1970 (LP) (Remixed compilation)
- You Well-Meaning Brought Me Here (Famous Music LP, SFMA 5753, 1971)
- Not Till Tomorrow (Reprise LP, K 44210, 1972)
- Easy (Reprise LP, K 54013, 1974)
- Streets... (Warner Bros. LP, K 56105, 1975)
- Right Side Up (Warner Bros. LP, K 56296, 1976)
- Ralph, Albert & Sydney Warner Bros. 1977 (LP) (Live album)
- Slide Away the Screen (Warner Bros. LP, K 56599, 1979)
- Water of Dreams (Mays Records LP, TG 005, 1982)
- Songs from Alphabet Zoo Mays 1983 (LP)
- Best of Alphabet Zoo Mays 1983 (LP)
- At the End of a Perfect Day Telstar 1985 (LP)
- The Best of – Tickle on the Tum Mays 1987 (LP)
- Bridge of Sighs Mays 1986 (LP)
- The Very Best of Ralph McTell Start 1988 (LP) (CD) (Compilation)
- Blue Skies Black Heroes Leola 1988 (LP) (CD)
- A Collection of His Love Songs Castle 1989 (Double LP) (CD) (Compilation)
- Stealin' Back Castle 1990 (CD)
- Silver Celebration Castle 1992 (CD) (Compilation)
- The Boy with a Note Leola 1992 (CD)
- Sand in Your Shoes Transatlantic 1995 (CD)
- Songs for Six Strings Vol II Leola 1996 (CD) (Live)
- Live at the Town Hall Leola 1998 (VHS) (Live)
- Travelling Man Leola 1999 (Double CD) (Live)
- Red Sky Leola 2000 (CD)
- National Treasure Leola 2002 (CD)
- The London Show Leola 2005 (DVD) (Live)
- Gates of Eden Leola 2006 (CD)
- The Journey – Recordings 1965–2006 Leola 2006 (4-CD Box set)
- As Far as I Can Tell Leola 2007 (Treble CD) (Audiobook)
- The Definitive Collection Highpoint 2007 (CD) (Compilation)
- McTell on The Mall Leola 2008 (DVD) (Live)
- Streets of London and Other Story Songs Leola 2009 (Download) (Compilation)
- Affairs of the Heart Leola 2010 (4-CD Box set) (Compilation)
- Somewhere Down the Road Leola 2010 (CD)
- Don't Think Twice It's Alright Leola 2011 (Download)
- Songs for Six Strings (1st - E) Leola 2011 (CD) (Live)
- Songs for Six Strings (2nd - B) Leola 2012 (CD) (Live)
- Sofa Noodling Leola 2012 (CD) (Instrumental)
- Songs for Six Strings (3rd - G) Leola 2013 (CD) (Live)
- Celtic Cousins Leola 2014 (CD) (Compilation)
- Songs for Six Strings (4th - D) Leola 2014 (CD) (Live)
- The Unknown Soldier Leola 2014 (CD) (EP)
- Live at Troubador Festival 1997 Troubador Records 2014
- 70th Birthday Concert Leola 2015 (DVD) (Live)
- Songs for Six Strings (5th - A) Leola 2015 (CD) (Live)
- About Time Leola 2016 (CD) (Ralph McTell and Wizz Jones)
- Songs for Six Strings (6th - E) Leola 2016 (CD) (Live)
- About Time Too Leola 2017 (CD) (Ralph McTell and Wizz Jones)
- Hill of Beans Leola 2019 (CD)

=== Significant album reissues ===
- Love Grows Mays 1982 – LP remix of Slide Away the Screen with different tracks
- The Complete Alphabet Zoo Road Goes on Forever 1993 – CD with extra tracks
- Slide Away the Screen and Other Stories Road Goes on Forever 1994 – CD with extra tracks
- Streets... Leola 1995 – CD with extra tracks
- Ralph, Albert & Sydney (Songs for Six Strings Vol 1) Leola 1997 – CD with extra tracks
- Easy Leola 1999 – CD with extra tracks
- Right Side Up Leola 2001 – CD with extra track
- Water of Dreams Leola 2003 – CD with extra tracks
- Eight Frames a Second Transatlantic 2007 – CD with extra tracks
- Spiral Staircase Transatlantic 2007 – CD with extra tracks
- My Side of Your Window Transatlantic 2007 – CD with extra tracks

=== Budget label compilations ===
- Streets Of London Transatlantic 1975 (labelled as "Budget Priced" on sleeve)
- The Ralph McTell Collection Volume 1 Transatlantic 1976 (labelled as "Special Price" on sleeve)
- The Ralph McTell Collection Volume 2 Transatlantic 1976 (labelled as "Special Price" on sleeve)
- Ralph McTell Pickwick 1978
- The Ralph McTell Collection Pickwick 1978 (Double LP of tracks from Transatlantic releases)
- Best Of Alphabet Zoo Music For Pleasure 1983
- A Collection Of His Love Songs Castle Communications 1989 (Double LP)

=== Other albums featuring significant contributions by McTell ===
- Just Guitars (various artists), CBS 1984 (LP) (live)
- Tickle on the Tum: Stories and Songs (various artists), St Michael 1984 (Cassette)
- Saturday Rolling Around (The GP's), Woodworm 1992 (CD) (live)
- Musical Tour of Scotland (Billy Connolly), Tickety-Boo 1995 (CD)
- One for Jonah (various artists) FooPoo 2004 (CD) (live)
- Tickle on the Tum: The Complete Series One (various artists), Revelation Films 2010 (DVD)
