= Prelude (band) =

English-based vocal harmony group, formed in 1970

- Origin: United Kingdom
- Genres: Folk, pop, MOR
- Years active: 1970–present
- Labels: Dawn, EMI, After Hours
- Members: Brian Hume; Irene Hume; Ian Vardy
- Past members: Chris Ringer; Jim Hornsby

Prelude are an English-based vocal harmony group, who in their most famous line-up consisted of Brian Hume (vocals, guitar), his wife Irene Hume (vocals) and Ian Vardy (guitars, vocals). They formed in their native Gateshead in 1970, having initially released a single in 1967 as The Carnival.

== Career ==
Prelude began to write their own material and built a following on the folk circuit and in 1973 they recorded their first album, How Long Is Forever?, on Dawn Records at Rockfield recording studios in Wales. From it came their best known recording, an a cappella version of the Neil Young song "After the Gold Rush", on Dawn. In the UK, it entered the Top 50 on 26 January 1974, had a nine-week stay, peaking at Number 21. In America, it entered the Billboard Hot 100 on 5 October 1974, and had a 13-week stay, peaking at No. 22.

The group subsequently toured the United States, but only scored one more hit "For a Dancer", which peaked at No.63. They then toured the UK, supporting Ralph McTell and Joan Armatrading. Also in 1974, they recorded backing vocals for Ralph McTell's hit single, "Streets of London".

The group signed with EMI, and in 1980 scored their second UK hit with "Platinum Blonde". The group appeared on Top of the Pops to promote the single. The follow-up "Trick of the Light" failed to chart. In 1981, they toured the UK with Don McLean. Further success was achieved in 1982 when a re-recorded version of "After the Gold Rush" made the UK top 30. The group released three further singles in the same year, namely, "Only the Lonely" (a cover of the Roy Orbison song), "City Tonight" and "Silent Night". An album, called simply Prelude, was also released at this time.

Vardy left the band in 1985. Irene and Brian Hume continued as a duo until 1987, when they were joined by Jim Hornsby (guitar, dobro and vocals), Tony Hornsby (bass and vocals) and Ian Tait (drums and percussion). By 1993, the Hornsbys and Tait had left and Prelude continued as a duo once more. They still wrote and performed on the circuit, along with Chris Ringer (bass/vocals). In 2008, they were rejoined by original member Ian Vardy, and performed as a four-piece. In 2010, Chris Ringer departed and Prelude were joined by Paul Hooper on drums and percussion, (who had recently left The Fortunes), and Steve Cunningham, ex Lindisfarne, on bass guitar. A CD was recorded with the new line-up entitled The Belle Vue Sessions, comprising mainly new Hume / Vardy compositions, was released in February 2011.

In 2012, Steve Cunningham was replaced by Keith Tulip on bass. As of 2019, the current line-up continues to tour.

== Discography ==
=== Albums ===
Year	Album	US	Record label
1973	How Long Is Forever?	—	Dawn
1974	Dutch Courage (titled After the Gold Rush in the US)	94	Dawn
1975	Owlcreek Incident	111	Dawn
1976	Back into the Light	—	Pye
1982	Prelude	—	After Hours
1997	Archive (compilation of 1980s material)	—	Realtone
1999	Good for You	—	EnMASSE
2000	Floating on the Breeze: The Dawn Anthology (compilation of 1970s material)	—	Castle
2006	After the Goldrush (The Dawn/Pye Anthology 1973-77) (2CD compilation of 1970s material)	—	Castle
2012	The Belle Vue Sessions	—	
"—" denotes releases that did not chart.

=== Singles ===
Year	Single	Peak chart positions				Record label
Year	Single	UK	CAN	AUS	US	Record label
1967	"The Big Bright Green Pleasure Machine" (credited as the Carnival)	―	―	―	―	Columbia
1972	"Edge of the Sea"	―	―	―	―	Decca
1973	"Out There"	―	―	―	―	Dawn
1974	"After the Gold Rush"	21	5	51	22	Dawn
1974	"Dear Jesus"	―	―	―	―	Dawn
1974	"Here Comes the Sun"	―	―	―	―	Dawn
1975	"Fly"	―	―	―	―	Dawn
1975	"A Love Song"	―	―	―	―	Dawn
1975	"For a Dancer"	―	70	—	63	Pye
1976	"Feel Like Loving You Again"	―	―	―	―	Pye
1976	"Never Be Anyone Else but You"	―	―	―	―	Pye
1977	"Oh My Soul"	―	―	―	―	Pye
1977	"That's Why I Love You"	―	―	―	―	Pye
1980	"Platinum Blonde"	45	―	―	―	EMI
1980	"Trick of the Light"	―	―	―	―	EMI
1981	"When Two Worlds Collide"	―	―	―	―	MCA
1982	"After the Gold Rush" (new recording)	28	―	98	—	After Hours
1982	"Only the Lonely"	55	―	―	―	After Hours
1982	"City Tonight"	BR	―	―	―	After Hours
1982	"Silent Night"	BR	―	―	―	After Hours
1983	"Freedom"	―	―	―	―	Black Crow
"—" denotes releases that did not chart or were not released in that territory.
