= Mandobass =

String instrument of the mandolin family

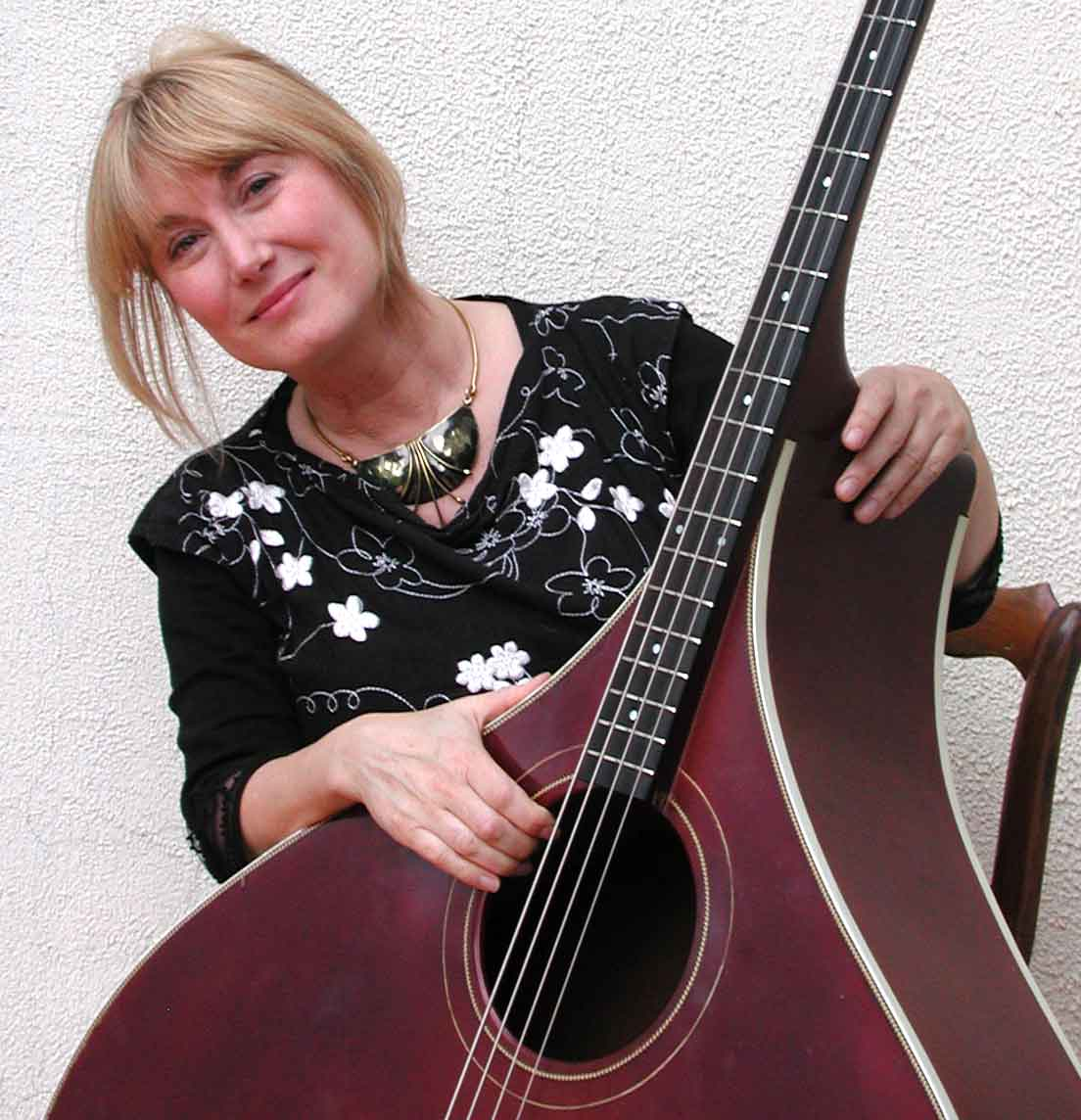
- Hilary James with mandobass
- Classification: String instruments Plucked string instrument

Related instruments
- Family; Mandolin; Mandola; Octave mandolin; Mandocello; Mandobass

The Mandobass is the largest (and least common) member of the mandolin family, sometimes used as the bass instrument in mandolin orchestras. It is so large that players usually hold it like a double bass—upright and supported on an endpin that rests on the floor. The neck-scale length on a full-size mando-bass is similar to that of a standard orchestral double bass viol: about 43 inches (110 cm). The instrument is otherwise similar to the smaller, higher-pitched members of the mandolin family, having a fretted neck, a headstock with geared tuning machines, and a large resonating body often—but not always—shaped like other mandolins.

== Variants ==
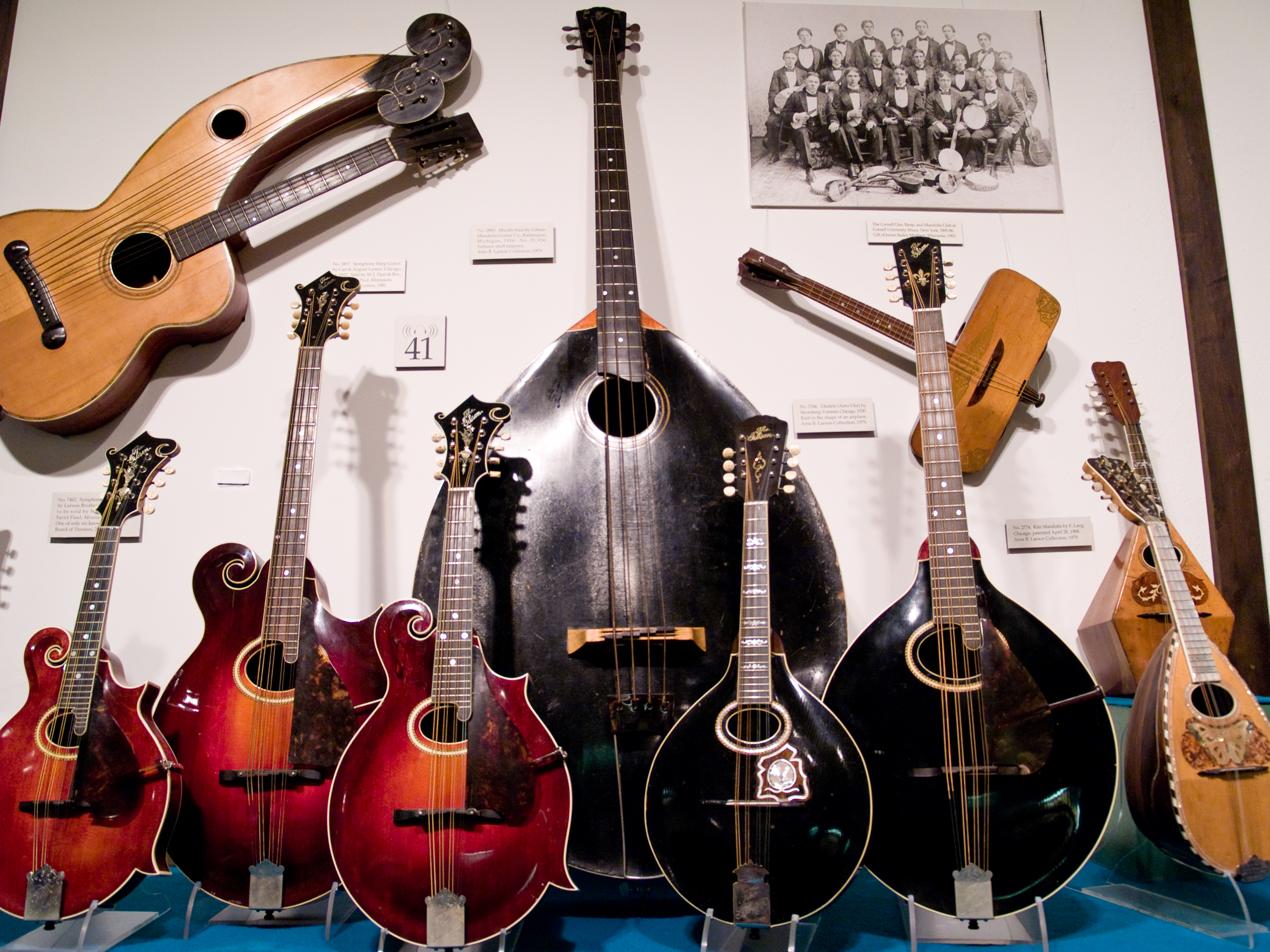
A Gibson Mandobass (center rear), displayed for size comparison

There are three main variants of the mandobass:

- The large four-string mandobass has a much longer neck and is tuned EADG, like a double bass or bass guitar. It was popular in early 20th century American and European mandolin ensembles. Early examples had very large bodies and were often played in an upright position like a double bass. Later examples often have smaller bodies and are intended to be played guitar style.
- The small four-string mandobass is identical, but built on a smaller scale and usually tuned either GDAE, two octaves below the mandolin, or CGDA, two octaves below the mandola. Though not as resonant as the larger instrument, players often preferred it as easier to handle and more portable.
- The eight-string mandobass, or "tremolo-bass", relatively rare, is built exactly like a mandolin but is much larger and tuned either GDAE, two octaves lower than the mandolin, or CGDA, two octaves below the mandola.

== History ==
When mandolin orchestras were being organized in numbers, the members became aware of the problem of adding bass to their orchestras. In trying to play the bass range, many mandolin players were reluctant to switch to the contrabass, because they saw its bowed action as an intrusion into their plucked-string world. They faced the problem, however, that mandolin basses were too quiet. Furthermore, they did not get the deep bass notes of the contrabass. For those reasons, most mandolin orchestras preferred to use the ordinary contra-bass, rather than a specialized mandolin family instrument. The bow not only helps with volume for forte sections of music, but the contrabass has deeper notes available.

Up until 1911, the mandolin family of instruments as known in the United States had no true bass member. Mandolins were relatively new to the United States, beginning to be known in the mid-1880s and reaching the peak of popularity before 1910. The American public was mostly unaware of the few mando-basses being made in Europe. Published minutes from the 1911 meeting of the American Guild of Banjoists, Mandolinists and Guitarists included an entry about bass mandolins developed in Britain, and indicate that issues related to the mando-bass were among the first discussed at the meeting. It was at this meeting that George D. Laurian of the Gibson Mandolin-Guitar Company announced that his department had developed a bass member for the mandolin family.

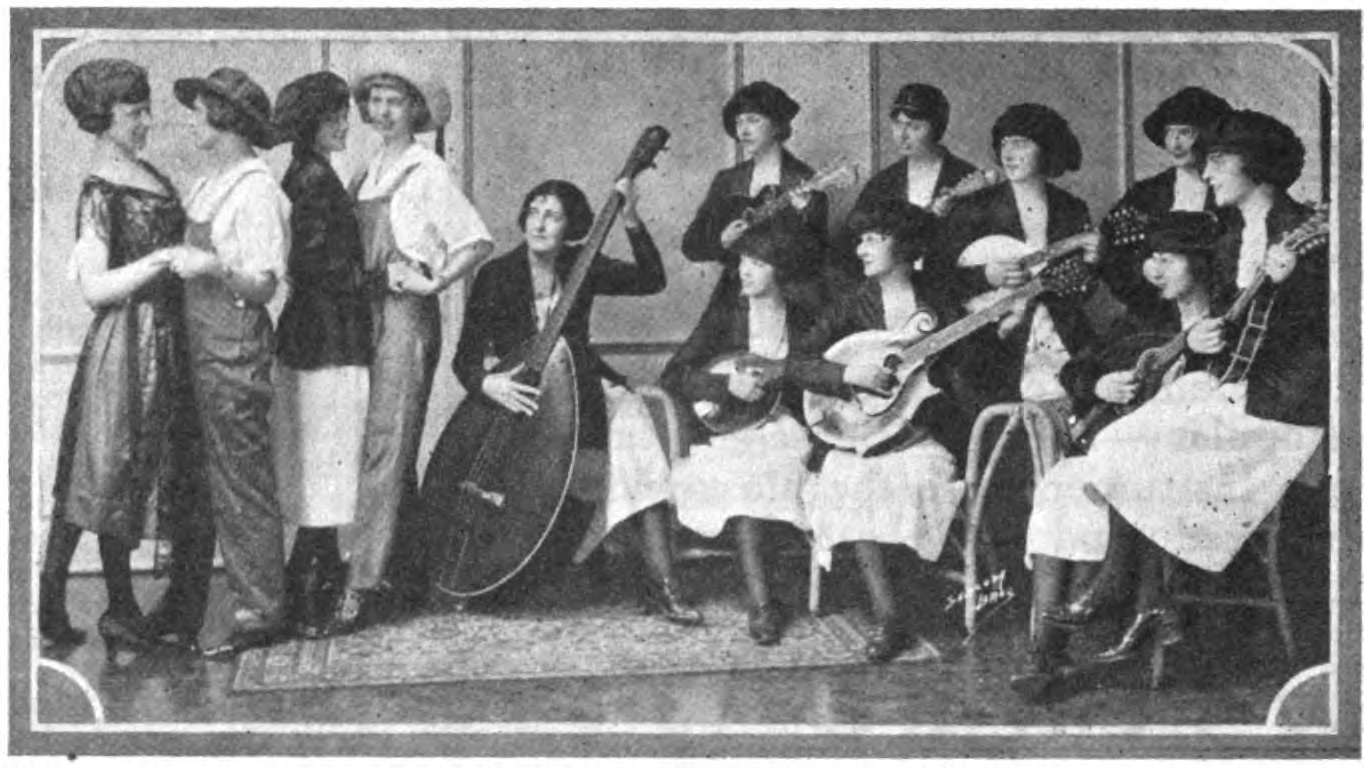
Gibson Melody Maids of Kalamazoo, Michigan, from a 1922 trade magazine. One of the musicians is playing a mandobass, center left.

At the Guild's next meeting in 1912, four companies displayed their versions of a mando-bass: Gibson, Leland, Vega, and Wm. C. Stahl. All four companies advertised extensively, but in contrast to its competitors, only Gibson promoted their mando-bass in photographs of musicians playing it in large groups, emphasizing the social aspects of playing their instrument. Ultimately, the two most successful instruments were those produced by Gibson and Vega.

Gibson designed their mandobasses to play either upright or on their side (like a regular mandolin) by changing the position of the pins the instrument rests on. Gibson made Mandobasses from 1912 to approximately 1930. Most mandobasses that survive from this era are Gibsons.

Musical instrument makers produced mandobasses in a variety of sizes and shapes. Gibson models were mostly a scaled-up version of the traditional "A" style mandolin (teardrop shaped), with the exception of their limited-edition "O. Pagani" model, which more closely resembled an orchestral double bass in shape. The Pagani model was also one of the few eight-string mando-basses made in the US, with four double-strung courses like the European tremolo bass. Vega produced both a flat-back and a humped-back mando-bass (known as a "cylinder back"), both with a generally mandolin-shape in outline, but with markedly pointed upper bouts. Other builders (H.F. Meyer; Prairie State; Wm. C. Stahl) produced instruments that were more guitar, lute, or cittern-shaped.

By the late 1920s, the popularity of mandolin orchestras was waning, and demand for the mando-bass began to evaporate. Gibson ceased production in 1930, and by the mid-1930s most other companies had followed suit. No commercial mando-basses are known to have been manufactured after 1940, and none are currently (2015) in production. An occasional instrument has been privately commissioned, however, such as that crafted in 1992 by English luthier Robin Greenwood, for musician Hilary James.

== Tuning and playing ==
As noted earlier, several tunings were employed for the mando-bass, depending on the style and size of the individual instrument, player's preference, and the requirements of the music to be performed. Tuning on the full-sized 4-string instrument was commonly in fourths, and identical to the orchestral double bass: E1 A1 D2 G2. This tuning was favored in both America and also quite common in Europe. Smaller, shorter-scaled instruments were more usually tuned in fifths, two octaves below the mandolin: G1, D2 A2 E3. In Europe, especially, this tuning was sometimes preferred even for the larger instrument.

The eight-string instrument appears to always have been tuned in fifths, either two octaves below the mandolin: G1 D2 A2 E3, or two octaves below the mandola: C1, G1, D2 A2. There is scant information as to how common this lower tuning (lower-ranging than the orchestral double bass) was, or in what circumstances people used it.

In playing the instrument, the left hand stops the strings against the top surface of the neck (fingerboard) for different pitches, in the same method as other stringed instruments. Given the scale of the neck and the presence of frets, the left-hand "feel" of the instrument is similar to a modern electric bass guitar.

As with tunings, right-hand playing methods varied. Photographs of the instrument in use show some players using a traditional mandolin technique with a plectrum (pick), while others play the instrument with bare fingers like pizzicato on the double bass. Vibrato is possible with either playing method, but somewhat more difficult that on higher pitched instruments due to the thickness of the bass strings.

== See also ==
- Mandolin
- Mandola
- Octave mandolin
- Mandocello
- Acoustic bass guitar
