= Alphabet Zoo =

British children's television series

Alphabet Zoo is a series of ten-minute programmes for young children, produced by Granada Television and was broadcast on ITV for two series in 1983 and 1984. It was presented by singer Ralph McTell and actress Nerys Hughes. Each episode is dedicated to a letter of the alphabet.

== History ==
Split into 16 episodes, Alphabet Zoo aired its first episode on 10 January 1983. Ralph McTell wrote 26 songs, one for each letter of the alphabet. The series was produced by Stephen Leahy, directed by Frank Hayes, and illustrated by Valerie Pye. Alphabet Zoo was written by seven people, of whom only two—Diane Wilmer and Linda Thornber—had prior experience in television. The other five writers were Anne Yates, Jeffrey Flynn, Nicholas Symons, Amanda Webb, and Chris Galer. Paul Danson designed the series' set, which was made in the studio of Granada Television, and which The Stage and Television Today said is "a much larger set than is customary for children's programmes". The set, which Broadcast's Belkis Bhegani called "expensive" and lavish", featured Duster the Dog, a Bernese mountain dog, as well as fountains and ponds.

The second series aired for 27 weeks. It was directed by Lorne Magory (who also worked on several famous British programmes such as Press Gang, Life Force and Emmerdale)

A hard-cover book of the series featuring an extended play containing four songs was published in March 1983. Another book, The Complete Alphabet Zoo, was published in 1994 and featured songs McTell wrote for the series including "Fergus the Frog", "Ollie the Otter", and "Yuri the Yak". Lahri Bond of Baltimore said that "there are some brilliant turns of a phrase and I guarantee that it will be you who asks your kids to listen to this fun-filled recording again, as soon as it is done".

Nearly a decade after Alphabet Zoo came to an end, the format was revived by ITV Carlton on the similarly named series Alphabet Castle which ran from September 1993 to December 1995.

The series was also transmitted on television in several countries worldwide such as TVNZ 1 and TVNZ 2 in New Zealand, RTB in Brunei, GBC in Gibraltar, TV1 and TV2 in Malaysia and on BFBS and SSVC Television in Germany.

== Reception ==
Stephanie Lucas criticised the series in The Times Educational Supplement, writing, "Alphabet Zoo is a nice idea: take each letter of the alphabet and make a series of programmes about animals whose names begin with the different letters. In practice, however, it turns out to be pretty standard stuff, efficiently and thoughtfuly done, but lacking in inspiration."

== Series overview ==
- Series 1: 26 editions, 10 January 1983 – 25 July 1983
- Series 2: 27 editions, 19 September 1983 – 2 April 1984 (Including one Christmas special)

== Episodes ==
=== Series 1 ===
01. A for Alligator
02. B for Badger
03. C for Camel
04. D for Dog
05. E for Elephant
06. F for Frog
07. G for Goat
08. H for Hedgehog
09. I for Iguana
10. J for Jackdaw
11. K for Kangaroo
12. L for Ladybird
13. M for Monkey
14. N for Newt
15. O for Otter
16. P for Parrot
17. Q for Quail
18. R for Rabbit
19. S for Seal
20. T for Tortoise
21. U for Unicorn
22. V for Vulture
23. W for Woodpecker
24. X for X-Ray Fish
25. Y for Yak
26. Z for Zebra

=== Series 2 ===
01. Albert Ross the Albatross
02. Boris the Bat
03. Camilla the Camel
04. Daphne the Dolphin
05. Edna the Elephant
06. Ferdie the Fox
07. Garibaldi the Gorilla
08. Harvey the Hippo
09. Ian the Impala
10. Jasper the Jay
11. Katie the Koala
12. Laurence the Lion
13. Maurice the Mole
14. Duster's Christmas
15. Nigel the Nightingale
16. Oscar the Ostrich
17. Percy the Penguin
18. Queenie the Quail
19. Robert the Reindeer
20. Stanley the Stoat
21. Terry the Turtle
22. Umbrella Bird
23. Vernon the Vulture
24. Wally the Walrus
25. X-Ray Fish
26. Yip the Yellow Hamster
27. Zoe the Zebra
