= Gates of Eden (album) =

Studio album by Ralph McTell
- Released: 2006
- Recorded: June–July 2006
- Venue: Village Hall, Stewedios, Cornwall
- Producer: Ralph McTell

Gates of Eden is a 2006 album by the English singer and songwriter Ralph McTell. It features Ralph McTell's versions of songs by artists who have influenced his musical direction. The title of the album is taken from the Bob Dylan song of the same name.

== Track listing ==
No.	Title	Writer(s)	Length
1.	"Pastures of Plenty"	Woody Guthrie
2.	"Vigilante Man"	Woody Guthrie
3.	"Georgia Bound"	Blind Blake; arranged by Ralph McTell
4.	"Do Re Mi"	Woody Guthrie
5.	"Glory of Love"	William Hill
6.	"Love Minus Zero"	Bob Dylan
7.	"Ludlow Massacre"	Woody Guthrie
8.	"I Belong to the Band"	Rev. Gary Davis; arranged by Ralph McTell
9.	"Gates of Eden"	Bob Dylan
10.	"About a Spoonful"	Mance Lipscomb; arranged by Ralph McTell
11.	"You Got to Change Your Mind"	Blind Boy Fuller; arranged by Ralph McTell
12.	"Prisoner's River"	Woody Guthrie
13.	"To Ramona"	Bob Dylan
14.	"One Too Many Mornings"	Bob Dylan
15.	"Song for Woody"	Bob Dylan

== Personnel ==
Adapted from the album line notes.

- Ralph McTell – 6-string guitar, 12-string acoustic, harmonica and national guitar on "You Got to Change Your Mind"
- Steve Turner – electric, nylon strung, acoustic and slide guitar, bass on "Gates of Eden"
- Willie Wilson – drums, percussion
- Adrian Davis – tuba, sousaphone
- Martin Frith – fiddle on "Song for Woody"
- Chris Parkinson – accordion
- Nancy March – backing vocals on "Do Re Mi"
- Janet Lewis – backing vocals on "Do Re Mi"

Production

- Ralph McTell – producer
- Mick Dolan – recording at Village Hall, Stewedios, Cornwall June–July 2006
