= Gates of Eden (Dickstein book) =

1977 book by Morris Dickstein

- Author: Morris Dickstein
- Publisher: Basic Books
- Publication date: 1977
- Pages: 300

Gates of Eden: American Culture in the Sixties is a 1977 book by Morris Dickstein on the American 1960s.
