= Gerald Garcia =

British classical guitarist and composer (born 1949)

Gerald Garcia (born 1949 in Hong Kong) is a British classical guitarist and composer.

After studying chemistry at Oxford University, he became a professional musician, making his debut at the Wigmore Hall in London. His more than fifteen CDs have sold more than 30,000 copies worldwide. In addition, he has performed with other musicians including John Williams, Paco Peña and John Renbourn.

Garcia is also known as a composer, particularly for his Etudes Esquisses for guitar, recorded for Naxos Records by John Holmquist. He is musical director of the National Youth Guitar Ensemble.

Gerald Garcia lives in Oxford, where, according to his website, he enjoys "cooking, computer music, Taoist Yoga and conducting the odd chamber orchestra."
