= Another Day (Steve Ashley album) =

Studio album by Steve Ashley
- Released: 20 January 2017
- Genre: Folk; protest music
- Length: 53:34
- Label: Market Square
- Producer: Steve Ashley and Martin Mitchell

Steve Ashley chronology
This Little Game (2015)	Another Day (2017)	One More Thing (2018)

Professional ratings
Review scores
Source	Rating
Folk Wales	5/5 stars
Morning Star	5/5 stars
R2 (Rock'n'Reel)	5/5 stars

Another Day is a solo album of original songs by British singer-songwriter Steve Ashley, featuring him on vocal, guitar, harmonica and whistle. It was released by Market Square Records on 20 January 2017.

== Production ==
The album, recorded in Cheltenham, Gloucestershire in summer 2016, was produced by Ashley and by Martin Mitchell. Mike Weaver designed the CD sleeve, incorporating a photograph by John Ash.

== Reception ==
In a five-starred review for Folk Wales magazine, Mick Tems described it as "a fabulous, hypnotic album".

Steve Johnson, who gave the album five stars in a review for the Morning Star, said that "Another Day contains a collection of songs inspired by the election of Jeremy Corbyn as leader of the Labour Party and it's a great antidote to the narrative spun by the corporate media...the real standout number has to be The Paper Song".

Oz Hardwick, in a five-starred review for R2 (Rock'n'Reel), said that most of the album's 14 songs are "fired with focused, intelligent anger, tempered with a sincere belief in the potential for change... they’re clever, well-crafted and heartfelt songs by one of our finest songwriters. Another Day is the most quietly powerful album I’ve heard in a long time".

Reviewing the album for Folk Radio UK, Johnny Whalley said "Another Day shows beyond doubt that Steve excels in hitting the blend of poetry, melody and meaning that makes songs truly memorable...There is an honesty and an openness that impresses from start to finish and the seed of optimism sown in the first track continues to push out shoots that lighten the mood of the entire album".

Colin Irwin, writing in Mojo, described it as "an understated album of sharp observations, lithe melodies and wry asides".

== Track listing ==
No	Title	Lyrics and music	Length
1	"Another Day"	Steve Ashley	2:32
2	"One Strong Voice"	Steve Ashley	2:53
3	"Oh No No"	Steve Ashley	5:08
4	"There Will Be Pain"	Steve Ashley	4:58
5	"The Paper Song"	Steve Ashley	7:55
6	"One for the Playlist"	Steve Ashley	3:51
7	"What Do You Do?"	Steve Ashley	0:42
8	"The Way the Rainbow's Made"	Steve Ashley	3:46
9	"For Bruce"	Steve Ashley	2:12
10	"The Land of Love"	Steve Ashley	3:41
11	"It's Just a Stage"	Steve Ashley	4:13
12	"I Wonder"	Steve Ashley	2:51
13	"The Months Go Round"	Steve Ashley	4:11
14	"Another Shore"	Steve Ashley	3:48
