= Steve Ashley =

British singer-songwriter (born 1946)

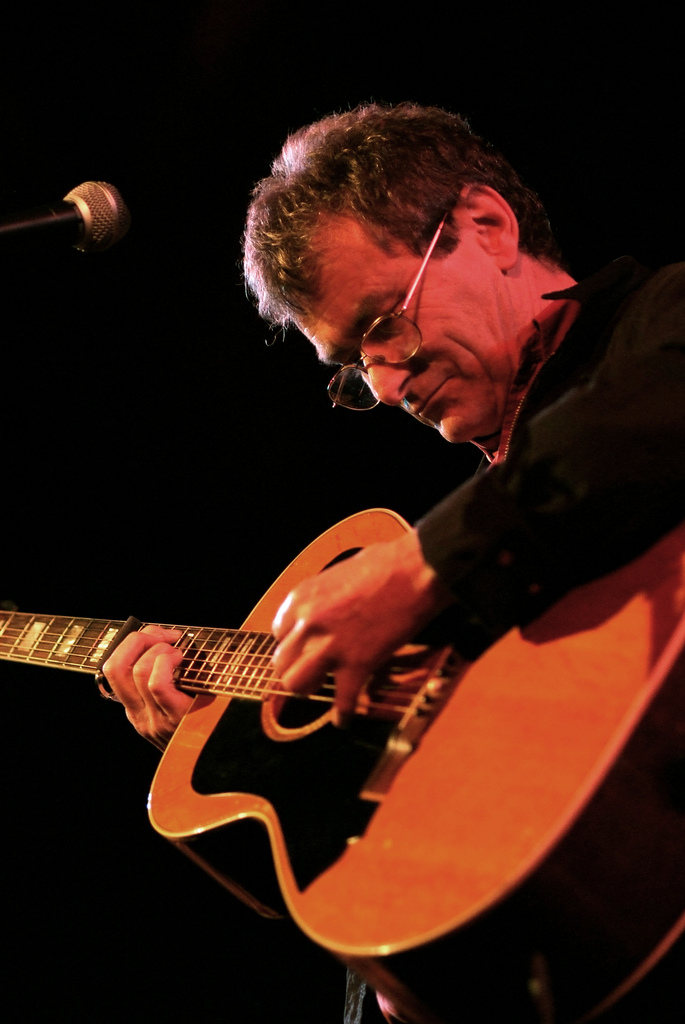
- Ashley performing at Union Chapel, Islington, London in 2007

Background information
- Born: Steve Frank Ashley; 9 March 1946 (age 80); Perivale, London, England
- Origin: London, England
- Genre: Folk
- Occupations: Singer; songwriter; recording artist; multi-instrumentalist; writer; graphic designer
- Instruments: Vocals; acoustic guitar; bouzouki; mouth organ
- Years active: 1971–present
- Labels: Gull; Motown; Topic; Market Square
- Website: steveashley.co.uk

Steve Frank Ashley (born 9 March 1946) is an English singer-songwriter, recording artist, multi-instrumentalist, writer and graphic designer. Ashley is best known as a songwriter and first gained public recognition for his work with his debut solo album, Stroll On (Gull, 1974). Taking his inspiration from English traditional songs, Ashley has developed a songwriting style which is contemporary in content while reflecting traditional influences in his melodies, poetry and vocal delivery.

== Biography and career ==
=== Early life and career (1946–1971) ===
Ashley was born in Perivale, London, England and grew up in Northolt, Middlesex (now in the London Borough of Ealing). In his early teens, he immersed himself in rock 'n' roll, blues and American folk music. He saw Buddy Holly, Gene Vincent and Lonnie Donegan perform live during his first years at secondary school. In 1960, he learned to play the mouth organ and developed a blues style influenced by Sonny Terry and Sonny Boy Williamson I.

After secondary school, he enrolled at Ealing Art College for the two-year Groundcourse under the tuition of Roy Ascott. Among Ashley's contemporaries at the college were many musicians, including (in the year ahead) Pete Townshend, Ronnie Wood and Roger Ruskin Spear. By 1962, Ashley was singing and playing blues harmonica in various bands. He also became seriously interested in British traditional music, performing unaccompanied songs in West London folk clubs. In 1964, he moved to Maidstone, Kent to study graphic design at Maidstone College of Art. There he met Peter Bellamy and joined him as a fellow resident singer in folk clubs in Maidstone and Rochester. Ashley led the art college blues band, The Tea Set, on vocals and blues harmonica. It was during this period however that his interest became increasingly focussed on English traditional folksong, which he heard and performed in the folk clubs, notably at the "Wig and Gown" club in Maidstone.

In 1967, Ashley qualified with a BA Hons and returned to London to start his first job as a graphic designer at The Observer, working with record producer Austin John Marshall. In 1968, now as a folk songwriter, Ashley formed a duo with guitar player Dave Menday called The Tinderbox. Managed by Marshall, The Tinderbox recorded a single for Polydor and a session for John Peel on his BBC Radio 1 Nightride show. The A side, "Farewell Britannia" was about the planned removal of the image of Britannia from the British penny. Just before the release of the record the image was saved on the 50 pence piece and the single was scrapped. Shortly after, The Tinderbox disbanded.

In 1971, Marshall landed a production and publishing deal for Ashley with Harbrook Music which gave Ashley free access to recording time at London's Olympic Studios, to record his first album. At this time Marshall also played the early demo tapes to the folk critic Karl Dallas, who interviewed Ashley for Melody Maker.

Acting as producer for Harbrook Productions, Marshall hired Robert Kirby to create string arrangements for many of Ashley's songs. He also hired a number of musicians to back Ashley, including members of Fairport Convention and Pentangle, plus a section of the London Symphony Orchestra, directed by Kirby. By the late summer of 1971, the first version of Ashley's debut album was completed and offered to a number of major and independent labels.

=== Albion Country Band and Ragged Robin (1972–1974) ===
By the spring of 1972 however, the album was still unplaced with a label, and then Ashley was invited by Ashley Hutchings to join the first touring ensemble of The Albion Country Band. This line-up included ex-Fairport members, Hutchings, Simon Nicol and Dave Mattacks, plus American fiddler Sue Draheim and ex-Young Tradition singer, Royston Wood. Sharing the lead vocal role with Wood, Ashley performed a few of his own songs plus a number of folk songs, including a 17-verse ballad, "Lord Bateman". The Albion Country Band was signed to Island Records but the band broke up before recording, after just nine months together.

By 1973, Ashley formed his own short-lived folk-rock outfit Ragged Robin, with Richard Byers, Brian Diprose and John Thompson. They performed in clubs and colleges, and at Cambridge Folk Festival, and also held a residency at Roy Guest's Howff in London's Primrose Hill.

After this band folded, Ashley initiated the formation of a contemporary folk club at The New Merlin's Cave near King's Cross, London. With help from Anthea Joseph and Heather Wood "Merlins" was host to many of the folk scene's leading players, including Sandy Denny and A L Lloyd. The club's resident performers with Ashley were Richard Thompson, Linda Peters, Simon Nicol, Robin and Barry Dransfield, Lea Nicholson, and Ragged Robin's Byers.

Writing in Melody Maker in 1973, Dallas described Ashley as "one of the finest singer-songwriters in Britain, if not the entire English-speaking world".

In November, Ashley signed a solo recording deal with Gull Records, and with a few track changes, his long-delayed first album was finally released in April 1974 entitled Stroll On.

=== Solo career – recording, live performance and campaigning (1974–1992) ===
After a three-year wait to find a deal, Stroll On was met with widespread critical acclaim in the UK. In The Daily Telegraph, Maurice Rosenbaum declared: "Ashley's own songs are the product of an extraordinary gift for creating material of true folk quality" and in Melody Maker, Karl Dallas hailed it as "the finest album since folk became contemporary". By the year's end it was awarded "Contemporary Folk album of the Year" in the leading monthly folk magazine, Folk Review. During this period, Karl Dallas frequently linked Ashley's name with Richard Thompson, as being in the vanguard of a new approach to folk song writing.

In 1975, Gull Records licensed the album to Motown in the United States and Ashley's first American tour was underwritten by that company. In spring 1975 Ashley undertook a six-week solo tour of the US and Canada, opening shows for many artists including Leon Redbone, Tracy Nelson, Gene Clark, Chris Hillman and Jonathan Edwards. In a review of his performance in New York's Greenwich Village, Variety magazine said: "Steve Ashley... is a delightful surprise... The performer not only sings his originals well, but has one of the funniest of dry stage raps. His voice is good. His originals are sensitive, ex-of the Albion Country Band, Ashley can hold an audience."

Back in the UK he recorded the follow-up, Speedy Return, and undertook a series of solo tour supports for a variety of headline bands, including Supertramp, Planxty, Isotope, Gong and Fruup. However, by the end of 1975, Gull's deal with Motown fell through and Ashley was without a record company. His planned third album, Rare Old Men, was never released and it was not until 1979 that Fairport's Dave Pegg recorded, produced and eventually released what was his third album, Steve Ashley's Family Album, on Pegg's own Woodworm label. In 1978, Ashley formed the Steve Ashley Band, an electric folk band that performed sporadically for 12 years, including appearances at the Rotterdam Folk Festival (1978), the Glastonbury Festival (1985) and the Cambridge Folk Festival (1990).

In 1978, at the Rotterdam Folk Festival, Ashley met the Australian folk-rock band, The Bushwackers, whose leader, Dobe Newton, asked Ashley to write some musical settings of poems by the deceased bush poet, Henry Lawson. As a result, The Bushwackers recorded three of Ashley's settings, and published four in their Australian Song Books.

In 1981, Ashley became active in Campaign for Nuclear Disarmament (CND)'s campaign to ban Trident and remove US Cruise missiles from the UK. He recorded and released two cassette albums of peace songs. Around this time he began a part-time involvement in Oxfam's publicity and campaigning work as a graphic designer and copywriter. During the CND campaign of the 1980s he performed from the main stage at the Glastonbury Festival (with Bruce Rowland and Chris Leslie) and also solo to 250,000 peace protesters in Hyde Park, London. He recorded a single with CND's Bruce Kent and the Labour peer, Lord Noel-Baker. Later, he took part in the blockade of the nuclear weapons factory at Burghfield and was eventually arrested for obstruction in the mass sit-in at the USAF base at Upper Heyford, Oxfordshire. This event was recorded in the song "Sweet Affinity" on his next studio release Mysterious Ways (Line Records, 1990). In 1992, Ashley retired from the music industry to concentrate on his design and copywriting work for various UK charities.

=== Solo "comeback" career (1999–present) ===
After an eight-year break from music, Ashley was encouraged to return by Peter Muir of the new Market Square Records label. First they released an anthology of Ashley's work, The Test of Time (1999) and, shortly after, an upgraded version of his debut album, entitled Stroll on Revisited. This album met with many welcoming reviews and the original album was celebrated in Mojo magazine in one its regular "Buried Treasure" features. Then, in 2001, Ashley signed a two-album deal with Topic Records, and in April they released Everyday Lives, his first studio album for ten years. Back on the road, Ashley performed as a solo artist and in duos with Al Fenn and Dik Cadbury, as well as making occasional guest appearances with Fairport Convention.

In 2006, Ashley celebrated his 60th birthday with a special concert with Robert Kirby conducting his arrangements for a six-piece chamber orchestra. Also taking part were Ashley's friends from Fairport: Dave Pegg, Chris Leslie, Simon Nicol and Martin Allcock, plus Show of Hands’ Phil Beer, Planxty's Johnny Moynihan, Brass Monkey's Martin Brinsford and many other friends, including his old partners from The Tinderbox, Ragged Robin and the Steve Ashley Band. The event was recorded and released six months later as Live in Concert on Dusk Fire Records. Then in 2007 Ashley released his second album for Topic, Time and Tide, with three new string arrangements by Robert Kirby. From this collection one song "Best Wishes" was recorded by Fairport Convention and the female trio Grace Notes.

In 2015, Market Square released Ashley's first stripped back solo album, This Little Game, which was included in both The Telegraph and Folk Radio UK's lists of "The Best Folk Albums of 2015". In a four-starred review for The Telegraph, its Culture Editor Martin Chilton said that the album "shows a craftsman at work...In Your Heart shows he still has a power to move with his songwriting". Paul Woodgate, reviewing the album for Folk Radio UK, said: "This Little Game may just be one of his best".

Ashley's 2017 solo album Another Day was described by Colin Irwin, writing in Mojo, as "an understated album of sharp observations, lithe melodies and wry asides". It received five-starred reviews in R2 (Rock'n'Reel), FolkWales Online Magazine and the Morning Star.

One More Thing, his solo album released in 2018, received five-starred reviews from the Morning Star and FolkWales Online Magazine. Reviewing the album for Folk Radio UK, David Kidman said: "Steve’s unafraid to name and shame, and as always he does so with a potent combination of lyrical poetry, delicious wit and darkly puckish humour...The album has an intimate, sharing quality, having been recorded simply at Steve’s own home in Cheltenham... Despite Steve’s insistence that One More Thing will be his final album release, the overall feel is far from valedictory."

His 1983 album, Steve Ashley's Family Album, was re-released in 2021 as a CD on the Talking Elephant label, with the title Steve Ashley's Family Album Revisited. It includes two additional tracks ("Somewhere In A Song" from the sessions for the original album, and "For Bruce", a memorial to drummer and percussionist Bruce Rowland, who appeared on the original album).

== Collaborations ==
Aside from his own albums, and the bands of which he has officially been a member, Steve Ashley has also performed on stage, TV, radio and recording sessions with a number other musicians. In 1968, with Tinderbox, Ashley recorded a live radio session with folk singer Shirley Collins for John Peel's Night Ride programme on BBC Radio 1. In 1973, at the request of folk singer Anne Briggs, Ragged Robin collaborated with her on arrangements and recording sessions for her album Sing a Song for You. In 1974 Ashley recorded a live session of his songs for Capital Radio's "Sarah and Friends" with Simon Nicol (guitar), Dave Pegg (bass), Dave Mattacks (drums) and Lea Nicholson (concertina). In the same year he recorded a single, "Old Rock ‘n’ Roll" (for Gull Records) with backing from Fairport Convention. In 1975 he recorded his songs "Old John England" and "Fire and Wine" for BBC Two's show The People's Echo in a band with Dave Pegg (bass), Richard Byers (guitar) and Bob Critchley (drums). In 1978, Ashley formed the first line-up of The Steve Ashley Band for a one-off show at Rotterdam Folk Festival, with ex-Decameron members, Dik Cadbury (bass), Bob Critchley (drums), Al Fenn (guitar) and Chris Leslie (fiddle). For some ten years after this show, Ashley and Leslie performed together intermittently in an acoustic duo.

In 1979, a band was formed to perform the songs from Steve Ashley's Family Album in a number of venues with a special "Family Show". Joining Ashley on stage were Fairport members, Simon Nicol, Dave Pegg and Bruce Rowland, plus Chris Leslie and the melodeon player, Martin Brinsford. In 1980, Ashley opened a fundraising concert for Friends of the Earth with the classical guitarists John Williams and Gerald Garcia headlining at London's Roundhouse. In an encore, all three performed in a trio, Ashley's song, "Candlemas Carol". In 1981, he performed in a one-off trio with Chris Leslie and Bruce Rowland on the main Pyramid Stage at Glastonbury Festival. In 1985, he performed with Fred Piek and Rens van der Zalm, two former members of the Dutch band, Fungus in Rotterdam.

Ashley was a close friend and creative associate of the naturalist author and filmmaker, Roger Deakin. Together they worked on two of Deakin's TV documentary films, The Ballad of the Ten Rod Plot and Stable Lads, with Ashley writing and recording music for both. Deakin also recorded a radio interview with Ashley about his forthcoming release, Everyday Lives, for the Australian Broadcasting Corporation.

Ashley recorded harmonica for Richard Thompson's soundtrack for the movie, Sweet Talker (1991).

In 1981, Ashley and Leslie were joined by Dave Pegg, Simon Nicol and Bruce Rowland to perform songs from Ashley's anti-nuclear Demo Tapes songs at Cropredy Festival. Then in 1999, after Ashley's eight-year break from music he got up with Fairport at the Cropredy Festival to perform his song "Fire and Wine". In August 2007, Ashley also performed his song, "Best Wishes" with Fairport at the Cropredy Festival, and again at Birmingham Town Hall – as part of Dave Pegg's 60th birthday celebrations in November 2007. Also in November 2007, the arranger Harvey Brough invited Ashley to sing his song, "The Rough with the Smooth" to a specially written string quartet arrangement as part of Brough's 50th birthday celebrations at Union Chapel, Islington.

In 2023 Penguin Books published Patrick Barkham's book The Swimmer: The Wild Life of Roger Deakin – a compilation of interviews with many of Roger Deakin's friends, including Steve Ashley.

On August 15 2026 at Fairport's Cropredy Convention Ashley joined Fairport Convention on stage to perform his song, "The Rough With The Smooth".

== Guitar and bouzouki playing style ==
As an acoustic guitar player, Ashley's technique is unusual. He plays a right-handed guitar, left-handed, without changing the strings, in the manner of Elizabeth Cotten. So, effectively, the instrument is played upside-down. As well as using standard tuning he utilises a number of guitar tunings. He also plays a custom-built electric four-string bouzouki. This unique instrument was designed to include a left-hand cutaway, and giving left-hand access to controls, but is once again strung as a right-handed instrument.

== Other artists who have recorded or performed Ashley's songs ==
Artists who have recorded or performed Ashley's songs include: The Arizona Smoke Review, Phil Beer, Anne Briggs, Maggie Boyle, The Bushwackers, Fil Campbell, Paul Downes, Fairport Convention, Jo Freya, Grace Notes, Green Diesel, Wizz Jones, Tom McFarland, Ralph McTell, Steph Miller and The Winter Station, Johnny Moynihan, Dobe Newton, O'Hooley and Tidow, The Owl Service, St Agnes Fountain, Show of Hands, Martin Simpson, Sproatly Smith, Christine Wheeler and Bill Zorn.

== Personal life ==
Ashley lives in Cheltenham, Gloucestershire.

== Discography ==
=== Albums ===
- Stroll On (Gull, 1974)
- Speedy Return (Gull, 1975)
- Demo Tapes (cassette only; CND, 1981)
- Steve Ashley's Family Album (Woodworm, 1983)
- More Demo Tapes (cassette only; PAC, 1985)
- Mysterious Ways (Lighthouse (Germany) LINE, 1990)
- Stroll on Revisited (Market Square, 1999)
- Everyday Lives (Topic, 2001)
- Live in Concert (Dusk Fire, 2006)
- Time and Tide (Topic, 2007)
- This Little Game (Market Square, 2015)
- Another Day (Market Square, 2017)
- One More Thing (Market Square, 2018)
- Steve Ashley's Family Album Revisited (Talking Elephant, 2021)

=== Singles ===
- "Old Rock ‘n’ Roll"/"Fire and Wine" (Gull, 1974)
- "Down The Pub"/"Outside The Pub" (Dovetale, 1980)
- "Down The Pub"/"Down the Pub" (German version) (Papagayo, 1980)

=== Anthology ===
- The Test of Time (Market Square, 1999)

=== Compilations ===
- The Electric Muse – various artists (Island/Transatlantic, 1975)
- Tasty – various artists (Gull, 1978)
- All Through the Year – various artists (Hokey Pokey, 1991)
- New Electric Muse – various artists (Castle, 1996)
- People On The Highway - a Bert Jansch Encomium (Market Square, 2000)
- The Acoustic Folk Box – various artists (Topic, 2002)
- Within Sound – Shirley Collins (Fledg'ling, 2002)
- The English Collection: A Definitive Collection of Classic English Folk Music – various artists (Highpoint, 2004)
- MidWinter – various artists (Free Reed, 2006)
- A Box of Pegg's – Dave Pegg (Matty Grooves, 2007)
- 60th Birthday Bash – Dave Pegg (Matty Grooves, 2008)
- Three Score and Ten – various artists (2009). Released on Topic Records, it included Ashley's "Ships of Shame" from Time and Tide as track 13 on the compilation album's fifth CD.
- Topic Records: The Real Sound of Folk Music – various artists (2017). Released on Topic Records, it included Ashley's song "Ships of Shame" from Time and Tide as track 3 on the compilation's second CD.

=== DVD ===
- Fairport@Forty – Fairport Convention (2007)

=== Publications ===
- (with Dave Thompson) (2013) Fire and Wine: An Armchair Guide to Steve Ashley. CreateSpace Independent Publishing Platform, 248 pp. ISBN 978-1492184959

== See also ==
- List of peace activists
