= One More Thing (Steve Ashley album) =

Studio album by Steve Ashley
- Released: 28 September 2018
- Genre: Folk; protest music
- Length: 44:01
- Label: Market Square

Steve Ashley chronology
Another Day (2017)	One More Thing (2018)	Steve Ashley's Family Album Revisited (2021)

One More Thing is a solo album of original songs by British singer-songwriter Steve Ashley, which he has described as "his last record". It was released by Market Square Records on 28 September 2018. The album received five-star reviews in the Morning Star, FolkWales Online Magazine and R2 (Rock'n'Reel).

== Reception ==
Professional ratings
Review scores
Source	Rating
FolkWales Online Magazine	5/5 stars
Mojo	3/5 stars
Morning Star	5/5 stars
R2 (Rock'n'Reel)	5/5 stars
Uncut	7/10 stars

The album received five-star reviews in the Morning Star, FolkWales Online Magazine and R2 (Rock'n'Reel). In his review for the Morning Star, Steve Johnson said: "Ashley insists that this really is his last album, but his involvement in left-wing politics meant he couldn't resist the temptation to retire disgracefully. Any Star reader listening to this album might hope there's a chance of at least a bit more disgrace before final retirement." Oz Hardwick, for R2 (Rock'n'Reel), said: "This understated yet vital album gets straight to the heart of contemporary yet 'political' (in its broadest sense) culture in a way that I'd like to see more writers adopting". Jim Wirth, in Uncut, described Ashley as "the Phil Ochs of the Momentum age...'Dare to question all you see…', Ashley sings on ‘Keep it Free And Easy’; if that’s his closing statement, it’s a timely one."

Colin Irwin, in Mojo, described Ashley's album as "A pertinent farewell. Throughout his long career, his sense of social injustice has barely wavered…"

A review for the music collector's magazine Goldmine Dave Thompson described it as "a topical album, in that anyone with an eye for recent British headlines will instantly recognize Ashley’s targets and themes".

Reviewing One More Thing for fRoots, David Kidman paid tribute to Ashley's "masterly British songwriting with all the bite of challenge". And in a review for Folk Radio UK, he said: "Steve’s unafraid to name and shame, and as always he does so with a potent combination of lyrical poetry, delicious wit and darkly puckish humour... The album has an intimate, sharing quality, having been recorded simply at Steve’s own home in Cheltenham... Despite Steve’s insistence that One More Thing will be his final album release, the overall feel is far from valedictory... [and] even if Steve sticks to his guns and never makes another album, you can bet that he’ll still find plenty more to say about this world – the watchwords of grit, determination and integrity will stay with Steve to the end."

== Track listing ==
No	Title	Lyrics and music	Length
1	"Stand Together"	Steve Ashley	4:04
2	"The White Helmets"	Steve Ashley	4:45
3	"My Door Knock Days"	Steve Ashley	2:34
4	"The Streets of Windsor"	Steve Ashley	0:56
5	"The Windsor Song"	Steve Ashley	5:05
6	"The Dragonfly"	Steve Ashley	3:15
7	"They Are So Few"	Steve Ashley	4:55
8	"When May Turned to June"	Steve Ashley	4:23
9	"Get Real"	Steve Ashley	3:42
10	"God Bless America"	Steve Ashley	4:00
11	"None of It's Fooling Me"	Steve Ashley	2:12
12	"Keep It Free and Easy"	Steve Ashley	3:36

Running time = 44:01

== Personnel ==
Steve Ashley performs solo, accompanying his own vocals with guitar and harmonica.
