= Stroll On =

1974 album by Steve Ashley

Studio album by Steve Ashley
- Released: May 1974
- Recorded: 1971
- Studio: Olympic Studios, London
- Genre: Folk music
- Label: Gull Records (LP: GULP1003 – UK, Germany, Australia, New Zealand, 1974; GU6-401S1 – United States, 1975: GU-401V1 – Canada, 1975); Line Records (LP: LRLP 5373 AP, 6.26043 – Germany, date unknown); Air Mail Archive (CD, remastered: AIRAC-1154 – Japan, 2005)
- Producer: Austin John Marshall

Steve Ashley chronology
Stroll On (1974)	Speedy Return (1975)

Singles from Stroll On
- 1. "Old Rock 'n Roll" / "Fire and Wine" Released: 1974: GULS 9 (UK); (New Zealand)

Stroll On Revisited

Studio album by Steve Ashley
- Released: 1999
- Recorded: 1971
- Genre: Folk music
- Label: Market Square Records (CD: MSMCD104)

Steve Ashley chronology
The Test of Time (1999)	Stroll On Revisited (1999)	Everyday Lives (2001)

Professional ratings
Review scores
Source	Rating
AllMusic	4/5 stars

Stroll On is the debut album by British singer-songwriter Steve Ashley. It was released in April 1974 in LP format on Gull Records and was critically acclaimed in the UK, being awarded “Contemporary Folk album of the Year” in the leading monthly folk magazine, Folk Review. It has been described as "a masterful, beautifully textured and gentle epic" and "a masterpiece of its kind – a beautiful, rich and deeply atmospheric collection of very English songs, like a musical impression of Dickens, Victorian Christmas cards and Thomas Hardy’s Wessex with a running concept concerning seasonal change". According to the music collectors' magazine Goldmine, it is "one of the key albums in the entire history of English Folk Rock".

An extended version with three additional tracks, Stroll On Revisited, was released in 1999 as a CD on Market Square Records.

== History ==
In 1971 Austin John Marshall arranged a production and publishing deal for Steve Ashley with Harbrook Music which gave Ashley free access to recording time at London’s Olympic Studios to record his first album. At this time Marshall also played the early demo tapes to music critic Karl Dallas, who interviewed Ashley for Melody Maker.

Acting as producer for Harbrook Productions, Marshall hired Robert Kirby to create string arrangements for many of Ashley’s songs. He also hired a number of musicians to back Ashley, including members of Fairport Convention and Pentangle, plus a section of the London Symphony Orchestra, directed by Kirby. By the late summer of 1971 the first version of Ashley’s debut album was completed and offered to a number of major and independent labels.

By the spring of 1972 however, the album was still unplaced with a label, and then Ashley was invited by Ashley Hutchings to join the first touring ensemble of The Albion Country Band. This line-up included ex-Fairport members Hutchings, Simon Nicol and Dave Mattacks, plus American fiddler Sue Draheim and ex-Young Tradition singer, Royston Wood. Sharing the lead vocal role with Wood, Ashley performed a few of his own songs plus a number of folk songs, including a 17-verse ballad, "Lord Bateman". The Albion Country Band was signed to Island Records but the band broke up before recording, after just nine months together.

In November 1972, Ashley signed a solo recording deal with Gull Records and, with a few track changes, his long-delayed first album was finally released in April 1974, entitled Stroll On.

The original track listing was changed prior to release when the deal with Gull was signed and "Silly Summer Games" was re-recorded, while "Love in a Funny Way" was removed along with "Spirit of Christmas" to make way for "Lord Bateman" (with the Albion Country Band).

== Release ==
After its UK release in April 1974 the album was also licensed for release in the Netherlands and Belgium through Dureco; in Germany, Austria, and Switzerland through the German record label Teldec; and in Australia and New Zealand through Astor Records. In 1975 the album was licensed for manufacture and distribution in the United States and Canada through Motown.

=== Single ===
"Old Rock 'n' Roll", with "Fire and Wine" on the B side, was issued in 1974 as a single in the United Kingdom and in New Zealand.

=== CD format ===
The album was first reissued in CD format in 1989 in a licensing deal by Gull with the German label Line Records. In 2006 Gull licensed the album to the Japanese company Airmail Recordings for a mini-album release on CD.

== Stroll On Revisited ==
Stroll On Revisited was compiled by Steve Ashley and licensed by Gull Records to the UK label Market Square Records in 1999. It comprises all the original recordings from Stroll On plus three additional tracks. Since the CD format offered more room than the original vinyl, "Spirit of Christmas" was reinstated along with "Love in a Funny Way" plus a single, "Old Rock 'n' Roll", which was recorded with backing from Fairport Convention and had previously been released by Gull Records in 1974. The CD jewel case for Stroll On Revisited includes an illustrated booklet which contains the lyrics of all the songs and a reappraisal of the album by Karl Dallas.

== Critical reception ==
Stroll On was met with widespread critical acclaim in the UK. In The Daily Telegraph, Maurice Rosenbaum declared: “Ashley’s own songs are the product of an extraordinary gift for creating material of true folk quality” and, in Melody Maker, Karl Dallas hailed it as “the finest album since folk became contemporary”. At the end of 1974 it was awarded “Contemporary Folk album of the Year” in the leading monthly folk magazine, Folk Review.

Music journalist Colin Harper described it as "a masterful, beautifully textured and gentle epic" and "a masterpiece of its kind – a beautiful, rich and deeply atmospheric collection of very English songs, like a musical impression of Dickens, Victorian Christmas cards and Thomas Hardy’s Wessex with a running concept concerning seasonal change".

The June 1999 issue of Mojo magazine featured the original Stroll On in its regular full-page series "Buried Treasure".

Lee Blackstone, writing in RootsWorld, said: "Stroll On: Revisited is a classic album in every sense. The musical guests run the gamut of the English folk-rock scene, but, mind you, this isn't a case of spoiled broth. Rather, Stroll On manages to be a well-orchestrated calendar album, with the play of seasons the overarching theme... Incredibly, the entire album has worn remarkably well and it bears the stamp of timelessness that the best British folk-rock can conjure... As a debut album, Stroll On is remarkably mature, and Ashley's magical achievement can now be savored again."

Keith Hadad, reviewing the album on Record Crates United, said: "[T]he range of influences on Stroll On is daringly unique. British and American folk and rock traditions have been seamlessly blended in with elements of Irish and classical music as well... Ashley’s starkly echoing vocals [on "Springsong"] sometimes harken back to Celtic choral singing while Kirby’s string arrangement is reminiscent of the Pastoral composers, like Ralph Vaughan Williams. Meanwhile the only percussion present in the song is a tabla being played in the traditional Hindustani style... [it] works beautifully here, making this an absolute highlight of the record."

Alan Rose, for The Living Tradition magazine, said: "'Stroll On' was released in 1974 amid critical acclaim, which all these years later seems eminently justified. The very first track led to his alternative title of 'The Fire and Wine Guy', and after twenty-five years its lush harmonies, electric arrangement and sound philosophy ensure that its magic is undiminished... Ashley's songs are packed with life-affirming, earth-touching sentiments, deceptively simple at first hearing but unfolding at each repeat to display deeper meanings with staggeringly intelligent and original use of language."

== Track listing ==
=== Stroll On ===
1. "Fire and Wine" (Steve Ashley) 4.33
2. "Finite Time" (Steve Ashley/Dave Menday) 3.48
3. "Silly Summer Games" (Steve Ashley) 4.49
4. "Springsong" (Steve Ashley) 3.25
5. "Monkey Puzzle Tree" (Steve Ashley) 2.55
6. "Farewell Green Leaves" (Steve Ashley) 4.24
7. "Morris Minor" (Steve Ashley) 1.31
8. "Candlemas Carol" (Steve Ashley) 2.50
9. "John Donne Song" (words: John Donne; music: Steve Ashley) 5.20
10. "Lord Bateman" (Child 53; Roud 40) (traditional, arranged by Steve Ashley, with acknowledgements to the Albion Country Band) 8.41
11. "Follow On" (Steve Ashley) 3.24

=== Stroll On Revisited ===
1. "Fire and Wine" (Steve Ashley) 4.33
2. "Finite Time" (Steve Ashley/Dave Menday) 3.48
3. "Silly Summer Games" (Steve Ashley) 4.49
4. "Springsong" (Steve Ashley) 3.25
5. "Monkey Puzzle Tree" (Steve Ashley) 2.55
6. "Farewell Green Leaves" (Steve Ashley) 4.24
7. "Spirit of Christmas" (Steve Ashley) 2.42
8. "Morris Minor" (Steve Ashley) 1.31
9. "Candlemas Carol" (Steve Ashley) 2.50
10. "John Donne Song" (words: John Donne; music: Steve Ashley) 5.20
11. "Old Rock 'n' Roll" (Steve Ashley) 2.55
12. "Love in a Funny Way" (Steve Ashley) 3.14
13. "Lord Bateman" (Child 53; Roud 40) (traditional, arranged by Steve Ashley, with acknowledgements to the Albion Country Band) 8.41
14. "Follow On" (Steve Ashley) 3.24

== Songs ==
=== "Fire and Wine" ===
Anne Briggs, who recorded "Fire and Wine" on her album The Time Has Come in 1971, three years before the release of Stroll On, said in the album's sleeve notes that the song had been "written by a good friend of mine. One of the few contemporary songs that's captured some of the essence of a good traditional song. It conjures up an image in my mind of sitting round a roaring fire on a winter's day with good friends and an unlimited supply of what everyone wants, and reflecting on what's happening outside".

O'Hooley & Tidow's 2017 album WinterFolk Volume 1 includes a version of "Fire and Wine". In a review for Folk Radio UK, Thomas Blake said: "in O’Hooley and Tidow’s hands, it becomes a sparkling, stately midwinter dream. Critical to the song’s success is the way it recognises the hardship of the season – the timeless image of the hungry robin, ‘see-sawing in one half of a coconut shell’, the cruelty of December frosts – without which the warmth and festivity would mean nothing".

== Personnel ==
- Steve Ashley – vocals, guitar, harmonica, whistle
- Richard Byers – electric guitar, mandolin, backing vocals
- B J Cole – pedal steel guitar
- Brian Diprose – bass guitar
- Thom Friedlein – bass guitar
- Dave Pegg – bass, mandolin
- Daryl Runswick – bass
- Danny Thompson – bass
- Barry Dransfield – fiddle
- Lea Nicholson – concertina
- Redd McReady – harpsichord
- Dave Mattacks – drums
- Chris Karan – tablas
- Claire Dawson – backing vocals
- Robert Kirby – string arrangement
- Albion Country Band Mk1 1972 (Ashley Hutchings, Royston Wood, Steve Ashley, Simon Nicol, Sue Draheim and Dave Mattacks) on "Lord Bateman"
- Tinder Box (Steve Ashley, Dave Menday, Tristam Fry) on "Spirit of Christmas"
- Steve Ashley, Jerry Donahue, Lea Nicholson, Dave Mattacks, Dave Pegg and Dave Swarbrick on "Old Rock 'n' Roll"

== Production ==
Stroll On was produced by Austin John Marshall for Harbrook Productions. The recording was engineered at London's Olympic Sound Studios by Bob Hall and Rufus Cartwright. The sleeve artwork for Stroll On was by Kenneth Laidlaw.
