= This Little Game =

Studio album by Steve Ashley
- Released: 9 February 2015
- Recorded: 2010–2014
- Venue: Recorded by Tommy Scott and Martin Mitchell in Cheltenham, Gloucestershire
- Studio: Mastered by Martin Mitchell at Instant Music
- Genre: Singer-songwriter
- Label: Market Square Records (MSMCD168)
- Producer: Steve Ashley

Steve Ashley chronology
Time and Tide (2007)	This Little Game (2015)	Another Day (2017)

Professional ratings
Review scores
Source	Rating
The Telegraph	4/5 stars
Record Collector	4/5 stars

This Little Game is an album by British singer-songwriter Steve Ashley. It was released by Market Square Records on 9 February 2015. Ashley's first stripped back solo album, it was included in both The Telegraph and Folk Radio UK's lists of "The Best Folk Albums of 2015". The album, which takes the form of a song cycle, is about the circle of life.

== Production ==
The album, which was recorded in Cheltenham, Gloucestershire between 2010 and 2014, was produced by Ashley who, with Mike Weaver, also designed the CD sleeve.

== Reception ==
In a four-starred review for The Telegraph, its Culture Editor Martin Chilton said that the album "shows a craftsman at work...In Your Heart shows he still has a power to move with his songwriting". Paul Woodgate, reviewing the album for Folk Radio UK, said: "This Little Game may just be one of his best". Nigel Schofield, for The Living Tradition, said the album, which "displays Steve's directness and integrity", is "replete with subtlety" and "continues to reward repeat listens, as new light reveals deeper facets and shades".

Kingsley Abbott, in a four-starred review for Record Collector, said: "Just Like The Leaves provides the album’s key track, its rumination on the inevitability of life and death neatly summing up the whole record’s reflective journey. Ashley delivers the material in an intimate and honest manner, allowing listeners to fully appreciate the nuances of his fine lyrics".

== Track listing ==
No	Title	Lyrics and music	Length
1	"Here's to All the Babies"	Steve Ashley	2:18
2	"Playground Days"	Steve Ashley	4:17
3	"People in Love"	Steve Ashley	4:30
4	"Rainsong"	Steve Ashley	3:24
5	"Summer's Come Again"	Steve Ashley	3:19
6	"That's Why"	Steve Ashley	6:31
7	"Time to Heal"	Steve Ashley	3:29
8	"Be True to You"	Steve Ashley	3:04
9	"Just Like the Leaves"	Steve Ashley	5:20
10	"The Last Deeds of Love"	Steve Ashley	4:14
11	"In Your Heart"	Steve Ashley	5:35
12	"All Will Be Clear"	Steve Ashley	3:17
