= Roll On Dreamer =

Studio album by Johnny Coppin
- Released: 1978
- Recorded: May / June 1978
- Genre: Folk rock
- Label: Avada / Red Sky
- Producer: John Acock

Roll On Dreamer is a folk/rock album by Johnny Coppin released in 1978, his debut solo album following his time with Decameron. Like the subsequent Coppin solo albums, it includes cover versions as well as Coppin originals and settings of Gloucestershire poetry.

The album was produced and engineered by John Acock, and recorded at Millstream Studios, Cheltenham during May and June 1978. It includes cello contributions from former Decameron colleague Geoff March and fiddle by Phil Beer who subsequently joined Coppin's regular band.

Roll On Dreamer was originally released by Avada Records as a vinyl LP, catalogue number AVA 102 with sleeve artwork by Rob Scattergood and photography by Paddy O'Biernes of Fairview Designs. It was rereleased on CD in 2009 by Red Sky, catalogue number RSKCD 119.

'Never Lost For Love' was re-recorded for the 2007 album "Breaking The Silence", a duo record with English singer/songwriter Mike Silver.

== Track listing ==
(Composed by Johnny Coppin unless otherwise noted)

1. "Liberty"
2. "Never Lost For Love"
3. "Angelus"
4. "If That's The Way You Feel"
5. "Roll On Dreamer"
6. "The Worm Forgives The Plough" (Bill Boazman)
7. "Archangel"
8. "The Roads Go Down" (Coppin setting of a poem by Frank Mansell)
9. "Midwinter"
10. "Warm Love" (Van Morrison)

== Personnel ==
- Johnny Coppin - Vocals, piano, acoustic guitar, harmonium

with

- Phil Beer - fiddle on "Angelus"
- Nigel Mazlyn Jones - 12-string guitar on "Archangel"
- Geoff March - cello on "Archangel" and "The Roads Go Down"
