= No Going Back =

No Going Back may refer to:

- No Going Back (TV series), a British reality TV series
- No Going Back (Johnny Coppin album), 1979
- No Going Back (Stiff Little Fingers album), 2014
- No Going Back (novel), a 1960 children's novel by Monica Edwards
- Hollyoaks: No Going Back, a late night spin-off from the British television soap opera Hollyoaks
- No Going Back: The Truth on What's Wrong with Politics and How We Move America Forward, a memoir by South Dakota governor Kristi Noem
