= Get Lucky =

Get Lucky may refer to:

== Albums ==
- Get Lucky (Johnny Coppin album), 1982
- Get Lucky (The Lascivious Biddies album), 2004
- Get Lucky (Little River Band album), 1990
- Get Lucky (Loverboy album), 1981
- Get Lucky (Mark Knopfler album), 2009
- Get Lucky: Lucky Ali Greatest Hits, an album by Lucky Ali, 2009

== Songs ==
- "Get Lucky" (Daft Punk song), 2013
- "Get Lucky" (Jermaine Stewart song), 1987
- "Get Lucky", by Dragonette from Galore
- "Get Lucky", by Heatmiser from Mic City Sons
- "Get Lucky", by New Young Pony Club from Fantastic Playroom
- "Get Lucky", by Takane Lui from Lapis Lazuli

== Film ==
- Get Lucky (film), a 2013 film featuring Luke Treadaway
