= Trevor Foster (drummer) =

English drummer

Trevor "Fozz" Foster is an English drummer, who started his musical career with Birmingham band Good News, then moving on as drummer for Bright Eyes. Trev then joined Birmingham based heavy rock band The Flying Hat Band in the mid-1970s. He then joined folk rocksters The Albion Band in the early 1980s. 2004 he worked with Little Johnny England for a short spell, going on to drum with friends Pipe Factory before retiring for good.

Foster has recorded with Johnny Coppin (ex-Decameron), Clifford T. Ward (deceased), Phil Beer band, Dave Pegg's Cocktail Cowboys, Maurice & The Minors, Simon Care, Polly Bolton and Elaine Morgan. Latterly, he was the drummer with Little Johnny England.

== Recordings ==
=== with The Albion Band ===
- Under the Rose (1984)
- A Christmas Present From The Albion Band (1985)
- Stella Maris (1987)
- The Wild Side of Town (1987)
- I Got New Shoes (1988)
- Give Me A Saddle I'll Trade You A Car (1989)
- 1990 (1990)
- Songs from the Shows Volume 1 (1990)
- Songs from the Shows Volume 2 (1991)
- Captured (1994)
- Live at the Cambridge Folk Festival (1998) (tracks 7–11, recorded 1987)
- Rockin' Barn Dance (2009) (recorded 1988)

=== with Johnny Coppin ===
- Line of Blue (1985)
- English Morning (1987)
- A West Country Christmas (1990)
- Full Force of The River (1993)
- Forest and Vale and High Blue Hill: The Gloucestershire Collection (1994)
- A Country Christmas (1995)

=== with Phil Beer ===
- The Official Bootleg (1986)
- Hard Hats in Paradise (1987)

=== with Ashley Hutchings ===
- Twangin' 'n A-Traddin' (1994)
- The Guv'nor's Big Bash (1995)

=== with Maurice and The Minors ===
- Run by The Moon (1987)

=== with Polly Bolton ===
- No Going Back (1989)
