= The Cocktail Cowboy Goes It Alone =

Studio album by Dave Pegg
- Released: 1983
- Recorded: Spring 1983
- Genre: Folk rock
- Length: 39:15
- Label: Woodworm Records; Resurgent Records
- Producer: Dave Pegg

The Cocktail Cowboy Goes It Alone is the first solo album by Dave Pegg, of Fairport Convention and Jethro Tull. It was recorded at his Woodworm Studios in Barford St. Michael during spring 1983; it was released in 1983 as Woodworm WR003.

Pegg formed a band called The Cocktail Cowboys to promote the album, featuring young local musicians. The band included Chris Leslie (later to join Fairport Convention) on violin and mandolin, Andrew Loake (of folk/rock/ceilidh band Bananas and also a duo with his brother Simon Loake) on lead guitar and mandolin, Simon Graty on keyboards, and Neil Gauntlett (later of Joe Brown's band) on pedal steel. Gauntlett went to the same secondary school as Pegg (Yardley Grammar in Tyseley, Birmingham), although a few years later. Drummer Trevor Foster was replaced midway through the tour by future Fairport drummer Gerry Conway.

== Track listing ==
Side 1

1. "The Cocktail Cowboy" (Dave Pegg) (3:05)
2. "Jack Frost and the Hooded Crow" (Ian Anderson) (3:15)
3. "Barnes Morris" (Ralph McTell) (2:29)
4. "All the Dance Numbers" (Glen Gardier) (4:00)
5. "The Swirling Pit" (Pegg) (3:28)
6. "Pipe Major Jock Laidlaws Fancy" (Pegg) (2:58)

Side 2

1. "The Journeymen" (Steve Ashley) (4:06)
2. "Carolans Draught" (arrangement by Dave Pegg) (3:50)
3. "Level Pegging" (Traditional, arr. Pegg) (3:03)
4. "Song For Sandy" (Pegg) (4:04)
5. "Lord Mayo" (Trad., arr. Pegg) (4:54)
