= Ship to Shore =

Ship to Shore may refer to:

- Ship to Shore (TV series), an Australian children's television series
- Ship to Shore (Nigel Mazlyn Jones album), 1976
- Ship to Shore (Richard Thompson album), 2024
