= Steve Ashley's Family Album =

1983 album by Steve Ashley

- Cover of the Road Goes on Forever release (1991)

Studio album by Steve Ashley
- Released: 1983 (LP); 1991 (CD)
- Studios: Woodworm Studios, Cropredy (1979) and Barford St Michael (1982), Oxfordshire, England
- Genre: Folk music
- Labels: Woodworm Records WR 002 (LP: UK); Road Goes on Forever RGF CD002 (CD:UK)
- Producers: Steve Ashley, Dave Pegg and Bruce Rowland

Steve Ashley chronology
Speedy Return (1975)	Steve Ashley's Family Album (1983)	Mysterious Ways (1990)

Steve Ashley's Family Album Revisited

Studio album by Steve Ashley
- Released: 30 July 2021
- Studios: Woodworm Studios, Barford St Michael, Oxfordshire, England. "For Bruce" recorded at Steve Ashley's home in Cheltenham, Gloucestershire, England
- Genre: Folk music
- Label: Talking Elephant Records (TECD465)
- Producers: Dave Pegg with Steve Ashley and Bruce Rowland (mastering); remastered by Martin Mitchell

Steve Ashley chronology
One More Thing (2018)	Steve Ashley's Family Album Revisited (2021)

Professional ratings
Review scores
Source	Rating
Morning Star	4/5 stars

Steve Ashley's Family Album is an album of original songs by British singer-songwriter Steve Ashley. It was released as an LP by Woodworm Records in 1983 and was reissued in LP and CD format on the Road Goes On Forever label in 1991. An expanded version of the CD, with additional tracks, was released by Talking Elephant Records in July 2021 as Steve Ashley's Family Album Revisited and received a four-starred review in the British national press.

Three tracks from the album – "Family Love", "Once in a While" and "The Rough With the Smooth" – were included in Ashley's 1999 compilation album The Test of Time.

== Track listing ==
1. "Family Love" (4.11)
2. "Born to Rule (The Baby's song)" (4.10)
3. "Pancake Day" (2.30)
4. "Lost and Found (The Dog's song)" (3.17)
5. "Once in a While (The Grandmother's song)" (4.28)
6. "Feelin' Lazy (The Father's song)" (4.27)
7. "I'm a Radio" (2.55)
8. "Days Like Today" (3.07)
9. "Love Is All We Live For" (3.38)
10. "Little Bit of Love" (4.43)
11. "The Rough With the Smooth (The Grandfather's song)" (6.56)

== Personnel ==
- Steve Ashley – vocals, guitar, bouzouki, mouth harp
- Chris Leslie – fiddle, mandolin, vocals
- Simon Nicol – electric guitar
- Dave Pegg – bass guitar
- Bruce Rowland – drums, percussion
- Martin Brinsford – mouth organ, melodeon
- "Capes" – vocal harmonies (arranged by Tom Morrell)
- Mark Powell – keyboards
- Trevor Foster – drums

== Steve Ashley's Family Album Revisited ==
The album was re-released on 30 July 2021 as a CD on the Talking Elephant label (TECD465), with the title Steve Ashley's Family Album Revisited. It includes two additional tracks ("Somewhere In A Song" from the sessions for the original album, and "For Bruce", a memorial to drummer and percussionist Bruce Rowland, who appeared on the original album).

The track listing is:

1. "Family Love"
2. "Born To Rule"
3. "Pancake Day"
4. "Lost And Found"
5. "Once In A While"
6. "Feelin' Lazy"
7. "I'm A Radio"
8. "Days Like Today"
9. "Love Is All We Live For"
10. "Little Bit Of Love"
11. "Somewhere In A Song"
12. "The Rough With The Smooth"
13. "For Bruce"

The CD is accompanied by a 12-page booklet containing lyrics to all the songs, sleeve notes (by Simon Jones) and archive photography. The artwork and layout was by Mick Toole and the cover photography was by Tim Matyear.

== Reception ==
=== Steve Ashley's Family Album ===
Dave Thompson, reviewing the original album for AllMusic, said: "there's a buoyant, all-together-now bonhomie to the album, even when the pace slows down for a handful of more reflective tunes (grandma's 'Once in a While' is especially lovely). And the joy is contagious, not only for the strength of melody and lyric that are the album's most obvious calling cards, but also for the sense of togetherness that binds the songs – like a family – together."

=== Steve Ashley's Family Album Revisited ===
In a four-starred review, the Morning Star described it as "definitely a welcome reissue...The album is in many ways a tribute to the notion of family life in all its forms, including the wider family of singers and artists."

Folk music website Armandaleg Music said: "With one track reinstated from the original sessions, and Steve’s poignant memorial to his friend, Bruce Rowland, we now have Steve Ashley’s Family Album – Revisited. And for those that know The Family Album of old, this new version will bring many fresh insights. For newcomers to it, this unique album is a classic collection of folk-rock songs about family life, by an English singer-songwriter in his prime, with impeccable support from members of another great enduring family – Fairport Convention."

Peter Shaw, reviewing the 2021 re-release for Folk Radio UK, said: "Fans of the original will appreciate the upgrade in sound, extensive sleeve notes and extra tracks. For those looking for a slice of vintage folk-rock from one of Britain’s finest songwriters, you’re sure to be welcomed into the family."

Reviewing the reissued album on the At the Barrier website, John Barlass said: "Family Album is, loosely, a collection of songs that capture the spirit of family life. There are songs about family outings and songs that express the ups and downs of life from the various viewpoints of the baby, mother, father, both grandparents and even the family dog. There are songs of joy, songs dripping with humour, songs of regret and songs of acceptance. And everything is wrapped in just the right amount of thoughtful instrumentation... best of all, there’s that unique Steve Ashley voice to put the lyrics over with exactly the right level of swagger or intimacy – depending on the subject matter!"

Dai Jeffries, for Folking.com, said: "It’s a record you can happily sing along with in places but you also uncover layers of meaning as you go. It’s as fine an example of Steve’s songwriting as you could hope to hear."

Nick Dent-Robinson, reviewing the album for pennyblackmusic.uk, described it as an "[i]mpressive reissue".

In May 2022, Steve Ashley's Family Album Revisited was the top-listed album in an article by Nigel Booth for The Scotsman on the top 10 re-issue CDs. Booth described the original album as "critically acclaimed but unjustly neglected".
