= The Family of Man (disambiguation) =

The Family of Man was a photography exhibition.

The Family of Man may also refer to:

- "The Family of Man" (Karl Dallas song), a 1955 song written by Karl Dallas, first recorded by The Spinners
- "The Family of Man" (Three Dog Night song), a 1971 song written by Paul Williams and Jack Conrad and performed by Three Dog Night
- Family of Man (horse), a champion Australian thoroughbred racehorse
