= Time and Tide (Steve Ashley album) =

Studio album by Steve Ashley
- Released: 16 July 2007
- Genre: Folk music
- Length: 51:23
- Label: Topic Records (TSCD569)

Steve Ashley chronology
Live in Concert (2006)	Time and Tide (2007)	This Little Game (2015)

Professional ratings
Review scores
Source	Rating
AllMusic	3.5/5 stars
The Guardian	3/5 stars

Time and Tide is an album of original songs by British singer-songwriter Steve Ashley. It was released by Topic Records on 16 July 2007.

== Reception ==
Reviewing the album for The Guardian, Robin Denselow said that Ashley "has continued to develop as a thoughtful songwriter and social commentator. On his new set, the gentle, sturdy melodies are matched with a rare blend of emotion and anger".

Pete Cann, writing in The Oxford Times, described the album as "a journey through Blair's Britain...a commentary on the despair of Blair's legacy". The "outstanding track" said Cann, is Ashley's "moving tribute to his grandfather, a railwayman and union organiser, Down the Line. The tune is traditional and the words heartfelt".

== Track listing ==
1. The North West Wind 5:37
2. Still Waiting 3:55
3. The Birds of the Country 1:41
4. Lands End 4:08
5. The Drowning Cell 4:41
6. Friend of the Rivers 2:16
7. Ships of Shame 3:36
8. Down The Line 6:01
9. A Time-Honoured Way 2:35
10. The Vintners 0:39
11. Pub Carpets 1:39
12. The Refugees 4:08
13. This Old English Town 3:38
14. A Better Day 3:28
15. Best Wishes 2:41

== Personnel ==
- Steve Ashley – vocals, acoustic guitar, harmonica, bells, whistle, drum
- Sarah Bushnell – viola
- Dik Cadbury – backing vocals, electric bass, keyboards, percussion
- Lesley Jackson – violin
- Chris Leslie – fiddle, mandolin
- Susannah Mahler – violin
- Paul Manning – piano accordion
- Simon Nicol – electric guitar
- Dave Pegg – acoustic bass, mandolin
- Tommy Scott – drums, keyboard, piano
- Geoff Short – violin
- Steve Trigg – trumpet
- Ness Whiffin – violin
- Lesley Willcocks – cello
- Robin Williamson – harp
- John Wilshaw – hurdy gurdy
