= The Flying Hat Band =

Early 1970s Brummie rock act

- Origin: Birmingham, England
- Genre: Hard rock
- Years active: 1971–1974
- Label: Vertigo
- Past members: Glenn Tipton; Trevor Foster; Andy Wheeler; Pete Hughes; Frank Walker; Peter "Mars" Cowling; Steve Palmer

The Flying Hat Band were an early 1970s Brummie rock act that, alongside English heavy metal band Judas Priest, ranked as the Midlands' favourites to succeed. Despite not having released an album, the band proved a successful club act and eventually went on to support English rock band Deep Purple on one of their European tours.

The band folded in April 1974 following Glenn Tipton's departure to become co-guitarist in Judas Priest, who at the time had just signed their first record deal with Gull Records. Peter "Mars" Cowling joined Canadian rocker Pat Travers in 1975, and was part of Travers' band for several years. Trevor Foster joined folk rock group The Albion Band and Little Johnny England.

== Personnel ==
Final lineup

- Glenn Tipton – vocals, guitar
- Peter "Mars" Cowling – bass guitar (d. 2018)
- Steve Palmer – drums

Former members

- Trevor Foster – drums
- Andy Wheeler – bass
- Pete Hughes – vocals (d. 2023)
- Steve Burton – vocals
- Frank Walker – bass guitar
- Dave Shelton – bass and guitars

== Discography ==
Signed to Vertigo, in 1973 the trio recorded a studio album which was never released.

In 1992, small German label SPM International released a split CD entitled "Buried Together", featuring Scottish rock band Iron Claw (erroneously labelled as Antrobus) alongside four Flying Hat Band demo tracks, dated back to 1973.

Those tracks are:

- Seventh Plain – 2:55
- Coming of the Lords – 6:46
- Reaching for the Stars – 4:36
- Lost Time – 2:39

== Trivia ==
Drummer Steve Palmer is the brother of Carl Palmer (Emerson, Lake & Palmer).

Original members Dave Shelton and Pete Hughes were also in Tipton's earlier bands Merlin and Shave'Em Dry, the latter with future Starfighters and Ozzy Osbourne drummer Barry Scrannage.
