= No Going Back (Johnny Coppin album) =

Studio album by Johnny Coppin
- Released: 1979
- Recorded: Summer 1979
- Genre: Folk rock
- Label: Rola Records
- Producer: Johnny Coppin

No Going Back is the second solo folk/rock album by Johnny Coppin released in 1979.

The album was produced by Johnny Coppin and engineered by John Acock and Mick Dolan. It was recorded at Millstream Studios, Cheltenham during the summer of 1979. It includes contributions from Coppin's road band members of the time, plus guests including former Decameron colleague Dik Cadbury.

No Going Back was originally released by Rola Records as a vinyl LP, catalogue number R002 with sleeve artwork by Tony Price Studios and photography by Kenneth Griffiths. It has never been released on CD, though some tracks have appeared on subsequent Coppin compilations.

== Track listing ==
(All composed by Johnny Coppin)

1. "No Going Back"
2. "Can You Feel It"
3. "Young Girl Town"
4. "Falling For You"
5. "Run To Her"
6. "Part In My Heart"
7. "Believe In You"
8. "Birmingham"
9. "He Will Let You Know"
10. "We Shall Not Pass"

== Personnel ==
- Johnny Coppin - lead vocals, acoustic guitar, keyboards
- Phil Beer - violin, guitar, vocals
- Tony Bennett - lead guitar, Spanish guitar, vocals
- Mick Candler - drums, percussion, vocals
- Steve Hutt - bassguitar, vocals

with

- Mick Dolan - guitar
- Pete "Bimbo" Acock - saxophone
- Chris Richardson - keyboards
- Anthony Head - backing vocals
- Regine Candler - backing vocals
- Gilly Elkins - backing vocals
- Gilly Darby - backing vocals
- Dik Cadbury - backing vocals
