= Iron Claw (band) =

Scottish rock band

- Origin: Dumfries, Scotland
- Genres: Hard rock, blues rock, psychedelic rock, progressive rock, doom metal, heavy metal
- Years active: 1969–1974, 1993, 2010–2013
- Labels: Rockadrome and Ripple Music

Iron Claw was a Scottish rock band formed in 1969 and ended in 1974. In March 2007, the band were mentioned in an article in Classic Rock called "The Lost Pioneers of Heavy Metal".

== History ==
=== Formation ===
The band was started in the summer of 1969 in the town of Dumfries, Scotland, by founder member Alex Wilson who recruited Jimmy Ronnie (guitar) and Ian McDougall (drums). They were joined by singer Mike Waller in November 1969. Wilson, the group's bass guitarist, had decided to form a band after seeing Led Zeppelin in concert in June 1969. Wilson and McDougall's attendance at Black Sabbath's performance at Dumfries in November 1969 (which Wilson recorded, representing Sabbath's earliest live recording), convinced them to not only cover Sabbath's first album and single live, but to consciously construct their sound around them. The band had originally performed covers by blues rock artists such as Free, Johnny Winter, Ten Years After, and Taste but soon began writing and performing original compositions. The band's name (Iron Claw) was eventually chosen by Wilson in March 1970 from a lyric from King Crimson's "21st Century Schizoid Man".

=== Lineup changes, breakup, and reunion ===
In 1971 Wilson had to replace Mike Waller (when he left because he wanted to play guitar) and so two new members (Wullie Davidson who performed on vocals, harmonica and flute, and Donald MacLachlan who played guitar) were recruited by Wilson and this changed the sound of the band to a more structured twin harmony guitar direction. However, in October 1971 when new recording sessions were looming, Donald MacLachlan was asked to leave the band as Jimmy Ronnie was unhappy with his presence in the band. After the recording sessions, drummer Ian McDougall left in May 1972 and was replaced by Neil Cockayne. The group finally broke up in April 1974. In 1993 Iron Claw performed one reunion show for charity. In the late 1990s a German "bootleg" CD of some of the early recordings surfaced. In 2009 sixteen recorded songs from the early 1970s were remastered from the original Alex Wilson master tapes and officially released on CD by Rockadrome Records.

In response to the critical success of the Rockadrome album the band reformed in 2010 and began working on an album of new material and unreleased outtakes from the 70's. New vocalist Gordon Brown was recruited by the three remaining members of the band to finish the album; Alex Wilson (bass), Jimmy Ronnie (guitar) and Ian McDougall (drums).

The resulting album, A Different Game was released internationally by Ripple Music (contracted from 2011 to 2016) in October 2011. In November 2011, Gordon Brown parted company with the band and following his departure Gary Hair was chosen to take over from Brown as vocalist. In March 2013, the band went their separate ways again.

== Discography ==
Studio albums

- A Different Game Second album released by Ripple Music (contracted from 2011 – 2016) in September 2011.

Compilation albums

- Iron Claw (2009 – present) Official CD release made from the 1970–74 Alex Wilson master tapes, remastered and released by Rockadrome Vintage records.
- Dismorphophobia (1996) released by Audio Archives.(A German bootleg of the 1970–74 Iron Claw recordings).
- Buried Together (1992) Split-CD featuring Iron Claw (erroneously(?) labelled as non-existing band Antrobus) alongside four The Flying Hat Band demo tracks. Released by SPM International.(The "Antrobus" tracks were bootleg copies of Iron Claw 1970–1974 tracks)
