= Dik Cadbury =

British musician

Dik Cadbury is an English multi-instrumentalist and singer, principally known as a bass guitarist and as former member of Decameron and the backing band of former Genesis guitarist Steve Hackett.

== Career ==
From a musical family, classically trained in childhood as a violinist and vocalist, he organised his London singing lessons to coincide with attending rock and R&B gigs at the Marquee Club. He began playing career in 1971 with Jug-Folk band Totem. He joined Decameron in 1973 following the release of their debut album 'Say Hello to the Band', initially as bassist, vocalist and fiddle player but later as a guitarist. On Decameron's demise in 1976 he opened the Millstream Recording Studio in Cheltenham. He joined Pekoe Orange in 1978 but shortly after that auditioned for Steve Hackett's new touring band, which he subsequently joined, recording the studio albums Spectral Mornings and Defector. Millstream Recording Studio was the first customer for an SL 4000 A Series Solid State Logic console (serial number 4KA010). In 1980 Cadbury and Decameron lyricist Dave Bell formed the jingle company Orijingles and a retro pub band The Teenage Idols to showcase their songwriting talents, and in 1983 teamed up with former Manfred Mann singer Mike d'Abo to form society party band Mike d'Abo's Mighty Quintet, still performing today. Also joined international party band Top Catz as guitarist and MD. Following Millstream’s closure in 1989, he branched out into voiceover work, photographic modelling and acting, dying in an episode of the BBC's Dalziel and Pascoe. He continues to write with Pete Hicks and Dave Bell as well as in his own right, occasionally performing solo. He has recorded and performed with numerous artists, including The Manfreds, Steve Ashley, Marcus Foster, The Dave Harper Band and many others.

== Discography ==
(abstracted from Cadbury's web site discography)

=== Solo ===
"About Time" (Choice Of Music 1999)

"Winds of Change" (www.dikcadbury.com 2016)

With Pete Hicks

"Cadbury-Hicks" (www.dikcadbury.com 2015)

=== With Decameron ===
- Mammoth Special (Mooncrest 1974)
- Third Light (Transatlantic 1975)
- Tomorrow's Pantomime (Transatlantic 1976)
- Afterwords (Live at The Bacon Theatre, Cheltenham - April 2001) (Castle Music - 2004)

=== With Steve Hackett ===
- Spectral Mornings (Charisma 1979)
- Defector (Charisma 1980)
- Live Archive (InsideOut 2001)

=== With Lee Fardon ===
- London Clay (Fardon Records 2015)

=== As session player ===
- Peter Bellamy - Merlin's Isle Of Gramarye (Argo 1972)
- Brenda Wootton - 2e Festival Kertalg '73 (Kertalg Festival 1973 - Live Double Album)
- Midwinter - The Waters Of Sweet Sorrow (Erewhon 1973)
- Alex Atterson - Roundabout (Parade - 1974)
- Richard Digance - How The West Was Lost (Transatlantic 1974)
- Richard Digance - Treading The Boards (Transatlantic 1975)
- Nigel Mazlyn Jones - Ship To Shore (Isle of Light 1976)
- Alex Atterson - Pushing The Business On (Plant Life Records 1977)
- Rosie Hardman - Eagle Over Blue Mountain (Plant Life 1978)
- Nigel Mazlyn Jones - Sentinel (Isle of Light/Avada 1979)
- Johnny Coppin - No Going Back (Rola 1979)
- Steve Ashley - Demo Tapes (CND 1981)
- June Tabor - A Cut Above (Topic 1980)
- Arizona Smoke Review - New Album (Rola 1983)
- Steve Ashley - More Demo Tapes (PAC 1985)
- Johnny Coppin - Line Of Blue (Red Sky 1985)
- Mike d'Abo - Indestructible (President Records 1987)
- Mike d'Abo's Mighty Quintet - Tomorrow's Troubadour (President Records 1988)
- Steve Ashley - All Through The Year (Hokey Pokey-Compilation 1991)
- Nigel Mazlyn Jones - Behind The Stone (Isle of Light 1999)
- Steve Ashley - Test Of Time (Market Square-Compilation 1999)
- Various Artists - New Christmas Collection (Choice of Music 1999) (contributes to numerous tracks)
- Mike d'Abo - And The Beat Goes On Live At Ronnies (Self-Produced June 2000)
- Steve Ashley - Everyday Lives (Topic 2001)
- Johnny Coppin - Keep The Flame EP (Red Sky 2004)
- Mike d'Abo - Handbags and Gladrags - The Mike d'Abo Songbook (President Records 2004)
- Steve Ashley - Time and Tide (Topic 2007)
- Keith Eardley - Through the Woods from Greendale (self-produced 2017)
