= Sentinel (album) =

Sentinel & The Fools of the Finest Degree

Studio album by Nigel Mazlyn Jones
- Released: 1979
- Recorded: 1979
- Genre: Folk
- Label: Avada / Isle Of Light /Kissing Spell
- Producer: Nigel Mazlyn Jones

Nigel Mazlyn Jones chronology
Breaking Cover (1977)	Sentinel & The Fools of the Finest Degree (1979)	Water from the Well (1987)

Sentinel (full title Sentinel & the Fools of the Finest Degree) is the third album by Nigel Mazlyn Jones. It was recorded in February and March 1979 at Millstream Studios, Cheltenham, produced by Nigel Mazlyn Jones and engineered by John Acock and Mick Dolan. It includes contributions by regular collaborator Johnny Coppin and then-members of Coppin's band (Phil Beer, Steve Hutt and Mick Candler).

The original LP was split into two sections — "Sentinel" on side one, and "Fools of the Finest Degree" on side two.

The album was reissued on CD in 2008 by Kissing Spell Records (catalogue number KSCD957) with additional tracks.

== Track listing ==
All tracks composed by Nigel Mazlyn Jones.

1. "Sentinel"
  1. "All in the Name of Love"
  2. "Sentinel"
  3. "Flying"
  4. "Roll Away"
2. "Fools of the Finest Degree"
  1. "Water Road"
  2. "All in All"
  3. "Fools"
  4. "The Wheel"

Additional tracks on CD reissue:

1. "Takes Two to Make It"
2. "The Hills of Celt"
3. "Baby This Time"
4. "All My Friends"
5. "Which Way to the Sea?"
6. "It Was All in the Name of Love" (instrumental)

== Personnel ==
(taken from original LP release)

- Nigel Mazlyn Jones – guitars, vocals
- Mick Candler – drums, percussion
- Steve Hutt – bass
- Pete "Bimbo" Acock – saxophone
- Dik Cadbury – guitar, vocals
- Johnny Coppin – piano
- Rob Lloyd – guitar
- Phil Beer – violin, vocals
- Chris Kerridge – bass, guitar
- Dave Titley – guitar, vocals
- Paul Anastasi – synthesizer
