= Dave Pegg =

English musician, songwriter and record producer (born 1947)

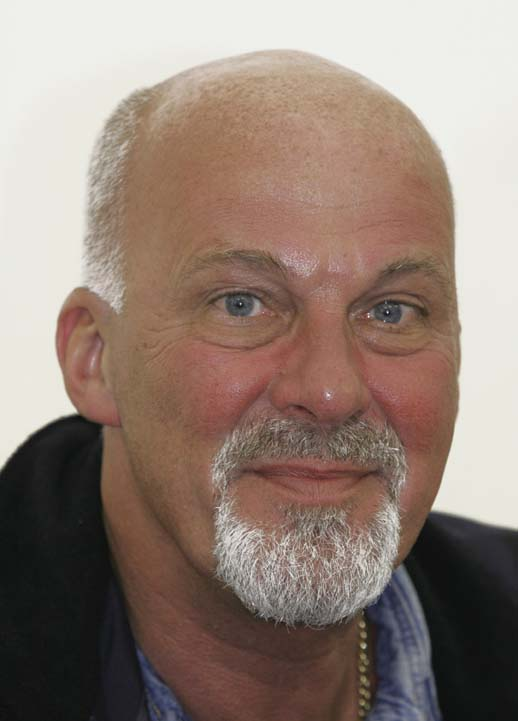
- Pegg in 2005

Background information
- Born: David Pegg; 2 November 1947 (age 78); Acocks Green, Birmingham, England
- Genres: Rock; British folk rock
- Occupations: Musician; songwriter; record producer
- Instruments: Bass guitar; mandolin; vocals; guitar
- Years active: 1960s–present
- Labels: Woodworm; Matty Grooves
- Member of: Fairport Convention
- Formerly of: Band Of Joy; Jethro Tull; Ian Campbell Folk Group
- Website: fairportconvention.com

Dave Pegg (born 2 November 1947) is an English musician, songwriter and record producer, primarily a bass guitarist. He is the longest-serving member of the British folk rock band Fairport Convention and has been bassist with a number of folk and rock groups including the Ian Campbell Folk Group and Jethro Tull.

== History ==
=== Early career ===
David Pegg was born on 2 November 1947, at Acocks Green, Birmingham, England. He began to learn guitar when 14 or 15, inspired by The Shadows, and played in a school band at Yardley Grammar School.

After leaving school he worked as an insurance clerk for about a year while playing in a part-time bands the Crawdaddys and The Roy Everett Blues Band, who supported several performers from the Birmingham beat scene of the time, including the Spencer Davis Group and The Moody Blues. In 1966 he auditioned for The Uglys, featuring Steve Gibbons and was beaten to the position by friend and guitarist Roger Hill, but was offered the job of bass guitarist and switched instruments.

The Uglys cut one single before Pegg and Hill left to form a blues trio, The Exception, with singer Alan Eastwood. At this period he played with Robert Plant and in his next band, The Way of Life, the drummer was John Bonham, later both went to form Led Zeppelin. In 1967 he joined the Ian Campbell Folk Group, where he switched to stand-up bass, learnt to play the mandolin and acquired his affection for folk music. It was also where he came to the attention of local folk guitarist Ralph McTell and former Campbell Group and future Fairport Convention member Dave Swarbrick.

By early 1969 he had moved back to electric bass with The Beast, with Cozy Powell and Dave Clempson, before the latter left for Colosseum. Soon after this he joined the Birmingham band Dave Peace Quartet, and played bass on their electric blues album "Good Morning Mr Blues" released on SAGA FID 2155. One week after seeing Fairport for the first time on his twenty-first birthday he was called by Swarbrick to audition for the band after the departure of Ashley Hutchings, who was soon to found Steeleye Span.

=== Fairport Convention 1969–1979 ===
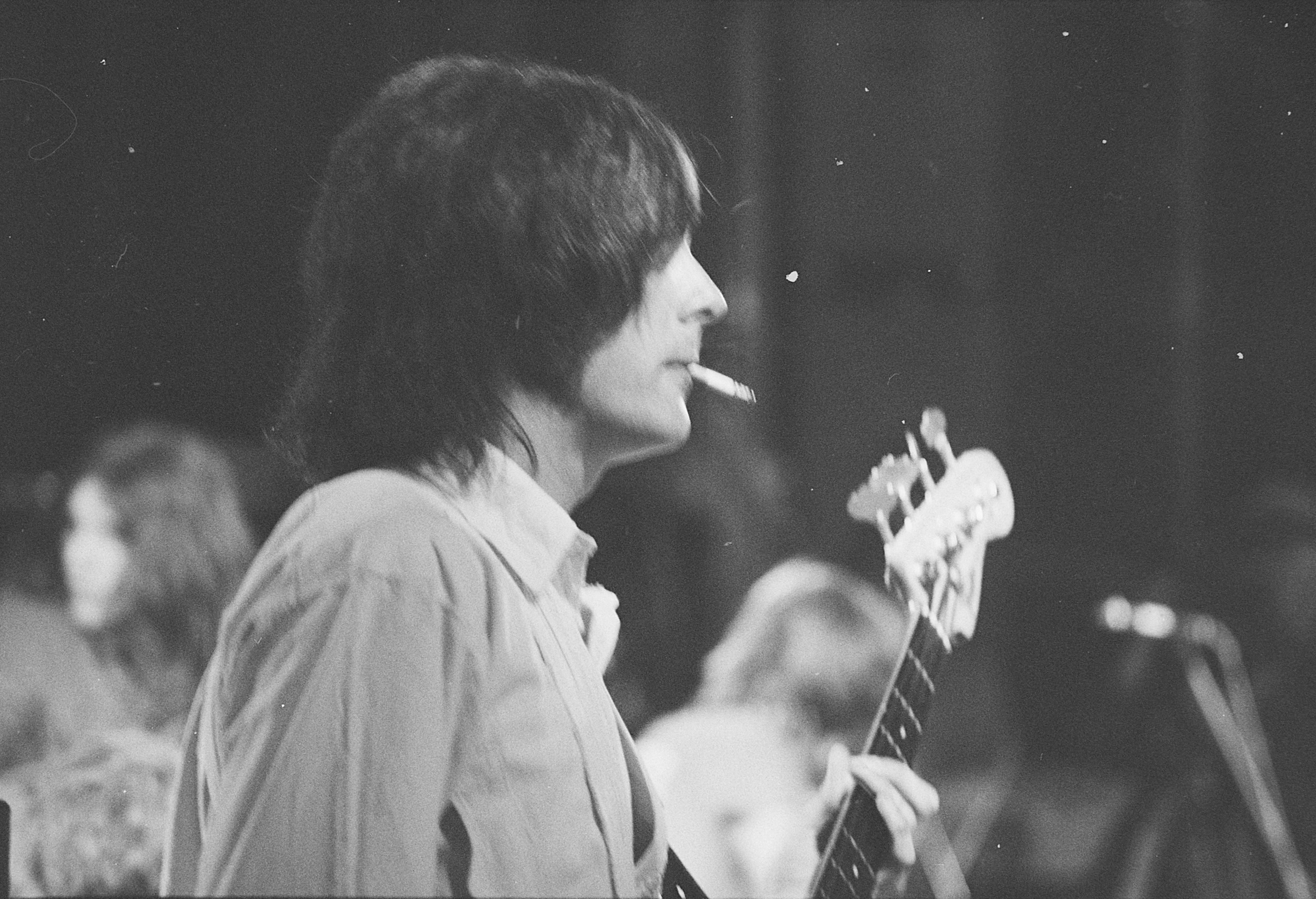
Pegg, with Fairport Convention at the Kralingen Festival, 1970

Pegg joined Fairport Convention towards the end of 1969 and formed a strong playing partnership with drummer Dave Mattacks and good relationships with the other members. Although Hutchings had been a solid and melodic bass player, Pegg played with greater virtuosity, complexity and energy. Ashley Hutchings credits Pegg with being the musician who began the technique of playing jigs and reels on the bass, rather than just a supportive bass line, which was subsequently adopted by most British folk rock and even folk punk bassists. All this was obvious on the 1970 tour of Britain and America (including support for Jethro Tull), recordings from which surfaced on the Live at the L.A. Troubadour album (1977). His first album with the group, Full House (1970), showed more technically accomplished playing from the band, showing Pegg's musical influence on the group.

On joining the band Pegg had moved his family from Birmingham and into the former pub, the Angel in Hadham, Hertfordshire along with other group members and their families. This became the theme for the title track of the next album Angel Delight (1971), for which Pegg received his first writing credit. On the next album Babbacombe Lee, a folk-rock opera masterminded by Swarbrick, he played a much greater role, contributing to seven of the fifteen tracks. The next album Rosie contained three of his contributions, including the song Peggy's Pub a statement of a lifelong ambition.

In 1971 when Simon Nicol and Dave Mattacks left the band, Pegg and Swarbrick were the only remaining members and, as a succession of personnel came (or returned) and left again over the next five years, their partnership kept the band running. Some of these performers, like Sandy Denny and her husband Trevor Lucas, were acknowledged songwriters and as a result, although he still made contributions and took part in collaborations, Pegg's song-writing took a back seat to his instrumental and organisational skills. After the financial disaster that followed the Rising for the Moon (1975) tour, which prompted Denny, Lucas and Jerry Donahue to quit the band, Pegg became increasingly determined for the group to take control of their finances and direction and took over a larger responsibility. Pegg and Swarbrick renewed contact with Nicol in 1975 forming a low key trio, Three Desperate Mortgages, which toured student venues across Britain.

With only Pegg, Swarbrick and replacement drummer Bruce Rowland left, they persuaded Nicol to rejoin the band during the Gottle O'Geer album sessions. The remaining quartet signed up with Vertigo, and produced two albums, The Bonny Bunch of Roses (1977) and Tipplers Tales (1978). Although well crafted these albums did not sell well and Vertigo bought them out of their contract. With Swarbrick suffering acute hearing problems and with no recording contract the group decided to disband and played a final concert at Cropredy in Oxfordshire on 4 August 1979, close to where Pegg lived.

While with Fairport, Pegg had played on a variety of albums for other performers. Among them were: Nick Drake's Bryter Layter (1970); John Martyn's Solid Air (1973) and One World (1977), as well as work for current and ex-Fairporters, including several albums for Dave Swarbrick, on Sandy Denny's Like an Old Fashioned Waltz (1973) and Rendezvous (1977) and Richard Thompson's Pour Down Like Silver (1975). He appeared on three Ralph McTell albums, including Streets (1973), and Slide Aside the Screen (1976), which Pegg also produced.

=== Woodworm and Jethro Tull 1980–1995 ===
Although Fairport had disbanded they continued to play annual reunions at Cropredy, supplemented by New Year's gigs in minor locations and occasional larger European festivals. Because no record label was interested in putting out recordings of the Cropredy concerts, Pegg and his wife Christine established their own label, Woodworm Records. They released the final concert as the album Farewell, Farewell (1979) and subsequent recordings were issued as 'official bootlegs'. He had already established a small recording studio in his house and with the money from the end of the record deal with Vertigo, he was able to develop this and it was eventually moved to a nearby converted chapel. The result was that Pegg had his own recording facility and record label. Artists like Steve Ashley began to record albums there from 1979. The Peggs established a mailing list of fans of the band, keeping interest in Fairport alive and, particularly Christine, took over the organization of the Cropredy Festival, which grew in size every year to reach about 18,000 attendees by the mid-1980s.

In 1979 Ian Anderson invited Pegg to stand in for the ailing John Glascock on the Jethro Tull Stormwatch tour. After Glascock's death, Pegg was invited to join the band, still one of the biggest in the world, and it provided paid employment for Pegg for the next fifteen years. Pegg happened to join at a turning point for Jethro Tull. His first recording was intended as a solo album for Anderson, involving only Martin Barre from the band. The album, A (1980) was in stark contrast to the medieval and folk music inspired previous work, depending heavily on synthesizers for its sound. At this time all the other longstanding members left the band and the recording was put out as a Jethro Tull album. Pegg coped with this, and subsequent changes of style. The next album, Broadsword and the Beast (1982) had a heavier sound and more medieval theme and Pegg joined the band on stage in pseudo-medieval costume beside a Viking ship. In 1983 Pegg recorded his first solo album, The Cocktail Cowboy Goes It Alone (1983). After the next Tull album, Under Wraps (1984), Anderson's vocal problems forced him to retire from touring for three years and Pegg had more time to pursue other projects.

=== Reforming Fairport 1985–1995 ===
In 1981 Pegg joined Ralph McTell and ex-Fairport members Richard Thompson and Dave Mattacks in the GPs (an abbreviation for the 'Grazed Pontiffs', after a comment by Dave Mattacks following the attempted assassination of the Pope). The aim was for a pub band, playing a few originals and blues, rock n' roll, soul and country standards. They only gave six performances, including the Fairport reunion festival in 1981 (at Broughton Castle, Oxfordshire), which Woodworm Records released a recording of the performance as Saturday Rolling Around (1991). In the 1980s he also appeared on several recordings by other folk artists, including Murray Head and Dick Gaughan, besides those by Fairport and ex-Fairport members Simon Nicol and Richard Thompson.

In 1985 Pegg, Nicol and Mattacks were also free and the trio decided to make an album of new material for the band to play at the Cropredy Festival, using the Woodworm studio and label. The result was Gladys' Leap (1985), which was generally well received in the music and national press, but caused some tension with Swarbrick who refused to play any of the new material at the 1985 Cropredy Festival. Nevertheless, the decision to reform the band, without Swarbrick, was taken by the other three remaining members. Ric Sanders was invited to join, along with guitarist, composer, arranger and multi-instrumentalist Maartin Allcock. Pegg was now in two major bands at the same time. The reformed Fairport produced an instrumental album Expletive Delighted (1986), mainly designed to showcase the virtuosity of Sanders and Allcock.

In 1987 Jethro Tull produced their first album for three years, Crest of a Knave, to which Pegg contributed and this was to be followed by an American tour, on which Anderson invited Fairport to support Jethro Tull. Needing an album to promote, Pegg negotiated financial support from Island Records and Fairport put together In Real Time (1987). This was presented as a live album, but was actually a studio recording (albeit with all the songs recorded "as live" with all the musicians playing at the same time) with dubbed audience reactions. Although the tour was musically rewarding, it was unproductive financially and Pegg, being in both bands, left the stage with one band to return after a few minutes with the other, and the process was inevitably exhausting. Pegg played on three more Jethro Tull studio albums: Rock Island (1989), Catfish Rising (1991) and Roots to Branches (1995). In the same period he contributed to three studio albums by Fairport Convention: Red and Gold (1989) the Five Seasons (1990) and Jewel in the Crown (1995). Fairport's popularity and the scale of their tours were growing throughout this period and the strain of undertaking two jobs, plus his other commitments, was becoming too much and he decided to leave Tull and focus on Fairport.

=== Focusing on Fairport 1995–present ===
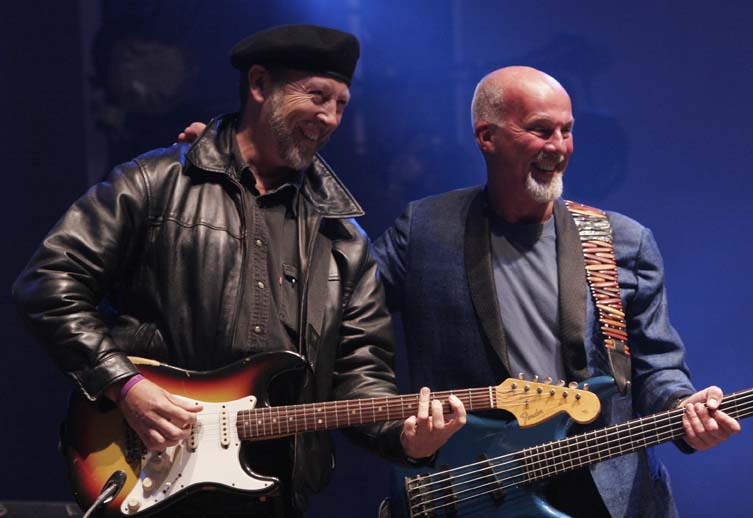
Dave Pegg with guitarist Richard Thompson (pictured at left) at Fairport's Cropredy Convention, 2005

Part of the result of this change was a higher output of albums for Fairport Convention, with five studio albums from the acoustic Old New Borrowed Blue (1996) to Over the Next Hill (2004), beside four live albums and compilations. Pegg also released his second solo album Birthday Party (1998), which combined recordings from a celebratory concert for his fiftieth birthday at Dudley Town Hall with studio recordings.

In 1998, Pegg formed The Dylan Project, a Bob Dylan tribute band with Simon Nicol, PJ Wright, Steve Gibbons, and Gerry Conway. In 2006, Nicol was replaced by Birmingham keyboard player Phil Bond. They tour annually in the autumn and have produced two studio albums and a live album recorded at Cropredy Festival.

In 2002 Dave Pegg shared with other Fairport Convention members a 'Lifetime Achievement Award' at the 2002 BBC Radio 2 Folk Awards.

In 2004 Pegg and his wife Christine divorced. The Woodworm studio was sold, and a new record label, Matty Grooves was established for the band and the group as a whole now organises the Cropredy Festival, now called Fairport's Cropredy Convention.

Pegg also formed Peggy & PJ, a duo with guitarist PJ Wright, who had been lead guitar with the Steve Gibbons Band, touring smaller venues and producing an album Galileo's Apology in 2007, a collection of pop and folk-rock songs and instrumentals. Pegg also had a second 'birthday bash' at Birmingham Town Hall, released as Dave Pegg's 60th Birthday Bash (2008).

In 2007 a retrospective of Pegg's career was launched. A Box of Pegg's contained four CDs, summarizing his work with Fairport Convention, Crawdaddy, Richard Thompson, Mike Heron, Steve Ashley, Jethro Tull, The Ian Campbell Folk Group and others.

From 2010 to 2013 he appeared in France with the Breton band Red Cardell.

Pegg lives in Banbury, Oxfordshire. He has a daughter, Stephanie, who works as a PR consultant; his son, Matt Pegg, is a bassist who has played with Procol Harum and Francis Dunnery and has also stood in for Pegg live with Jethro Tull when Pegg was committed to touring with Fairport Convention.

== Discography ==
For Fairport Convention albums see Fairport Convention discography
For Jethro Tull albums see Jethro Tull discography

As solo artist or with friends

- The Cocktail Cowboy Goes It Alone (Woodworm, 1983).
- Birthday Party (Woodworm, 1998).
- A Box of Pegg's (Matty Grooves, 2007)
- Dave Pegg's 60th Birthday Bash (Matty Grooves, 2008)

As a member of Dave Peace Quartet

- Good Morning Mr Blues (SAGA Records FID 2155, 1969)

On Dana Scott and the Crown Folk album

- Folk in Worship (BBC Records, 1969)

On Amory Kane album

- Just to Be There (CBS, 1970)

On Nick Drake albums

- Bryter Layter (Island, 1970)
- Fruit Tree (Island, 1979)
- Way to Blue: – An Introduction to Nick Drake (Island, 1994)
- Nick Drake Treasury (Island, 2004)

On A. L. Lloyd albums

- The Great Australian Legend (Topic, 1971)
- Old Bush Songs (1995)

On Mike Heron albums

- Smiling Men with Bad Reputations (Elektra, 1971)

On Marc Ellington albums

- Rains / Reins of Changes (B&C, 1971)

On Alan Taylor albums

- Sometimes (United Artists, 1971)

On Harvey Andrews albums

- Faces and Places (Decca Nova, 1970)
- Writer of Songs (Cube, 1971)

On Mick Greenwood albums

- Living Game (MCA, 1971)

On John Martyn albums

- Solid Air (Island, 1973)
- One World (Island, 1977)
- Little Sweet Mysteries: the Island Anthology (Island, 1995)

On Chris Darrow albums

- Chris Darrow (United Artists, 1973)

On Bryn Haworth albums

- Sunny Side of the Street (Island, 1973)
- Songs and Hymns (Kingsway, 1999)

On Sandy Denny Albums

- Like an Old Fashioned Waltz (Island, 1973)
- Rendezvous (Island, 1977)
- Who Knows Where The Time Goes? (Island, 1985)
- A Boxful of Treasures (Fledg'ling, 2004)

On Krysia Kocjan albums

- Krysia (RCA, 1974)

On Steve Ashley albums

- Stroll On (Gull, 1974)
- Speedy Return (Gull, 1975)
- Steve Ashley's Family Album (Woodworm, 1983)
- Mysterious Ways (Lighthouse, 1990)
- Test of Time (Topic, 1998)
- Stroll On Revisited (Market Square, 1999)
- Everyday Lives (Topic, 2001)
- Acoustic Folk Box (Topic, 2002)
- Speedy Return (Market Square, 2003)
- Live in Concert (Dusk Fire, 2006)
- Time and Tide (Topic, 2007)
- Steve Ashley's Family Album Revisited, (Talking Elephant, 2021)

On Richard & Linda Thompson albums

- Pour Down Like Silver (Island, 1975)
- Sunnyvista (Chrysalis, 1979)
- Shoot Out the Lights (Hannibal, 1982)

On Ralph McTell albums

- Streets... (Warner Brothers, 1973)
- Right Side Up (Warner Brothers, 1976)
- Slide Away the Screen (Warner Brothers, 1977)
- Streets of London (Warner Brothers, 1981)
- From Claire to Here: the songs of Ralph McTell (Red House, 1996)
- Red Sky (Leola, 2000)

On Dave Swarbrick albums

- Swarbrick (Transatlantic, 1976)
- Swarbrick II (Transatlantic, 1977)
- The Ceilidh Album (Sonet, 1978)
- Lift the Lid and Listen (Sonet, 1978)
- Smiddyburn (Logo, 1981)
- Flittin (Spendthrift, 1983)
- The English Fiddler: Swarbrick plays Swarbrick (Naxos World, 2002)

On Richard Thompson albums

- (guitar, vocal) (Island, 1976)
- Hand of Kindness (Hannibal, 1983)
- Watching The Dark: The History of Richard Thompson (Hannibal, 1993)

On Gay & Terry Woods albums

- The Time is Right (Polydor 1976)
- Lake Songs from Red Waters-The Best of Gay & Terry Woods (2004)

On Dan Ar Bras albums

- Douar Nevez (Hexagone, 1977)

On Julie Covington albums

- Julie Covington (Fame, 1978)

On Craig Nuttyholme albums

- It's Just a Lifetime (A&M, 1978)

On Murray Head albums

- Voices (Mercury, 1980)

On Dick Gaughan albums

- A Different Kind of Love Song (Celtic, 1983)
- Dick Gaughan Prentice Piece (Green Trax, 2002)

On Simon Nicol albums

- Before Your Time (Woodworm, 1987)

With various artists

- Circle Dance—The Hokey Pokey Charity Compilation (Hokey Pokey ConeD, 1990)
- Footsteps to Fame, vol 2 (Repertoire, 1991)
- To Cry You a Song: A Collection of Tull Tales (Magna Carta, 1996)
- Best of British Folk Rock (Park, 1997)
- House on Fire vol 2, an Urban Folk Collection (Red House, 1997)
- Blues Britannia (Bridge, 2000)
- Acoustic folk box (Topic, 2002)
- Acoustic vol 2 (Topic, 2002)
- Master Craftsmen (Terra Nova, 2002)
- Along the Pilgrim Way (Pickwick, 2003)
- Best of British Folk (Prism Leisure, 2003)

With The G.P.s

- Saturday Rolling Around live from Broughton Castle (Woodworm, 1991)

On Beryl Marriott with Fairport Convention & Chris Leslie albums

- Weave The Mirror (Woodworm, 1991)

On Sally Barker albums

- The Rhythm is Mine (Hannibal, 1990)
- Another Train (Hypertension, 2000)

On Linda Thompson albums

- Dreams Fly Away: A History of Linda Thompson (Hannibal, 1996)
- Fashionably Late (Topic, 2002)

On Steve Tilston and Maggy Boyle albums

- All Under the Sun (Flying Fish, 1996)

On Ashley Hutchings albums

- The Guv'nor vol 4 (Castle, 1996)

On Phil Pickett albums

- The Bones of All Men (Hannibal, 1998)

With the Dylan Project

- The Dylan Project (Woodworm, 1998)
- The Dylan Project...Live at Cropredy Festival (Woodworm, 1999)
- The Dylan Project 2 (Matty Grooves 2005)

On Alan Simon albums

- Excalibur: La Legende des Celtes (Sbme, 1999)
- Excalibur: Concert Mythique (Epic, 2000)
- Excalibur II: The Celtic Ring (EMI, 2007)

On Fallen Angel albums

- Happy Ever After (Tara, 1999)

On Jerry Donahue albums

- Telecasting recast (Pharaoh, 1999)

On David Hughes albums

- This Other Eden (The Folk Corporation, 1999)
- Recognised (The Folk Corporation, 2002)

On Bob Fox albums

- Dreams Never Leave You (Woodworm, 2000)

On Shirley Collins albums

- Within Sound (Fledg'ling, 2002)

On Chris Leslie albums

- Dancing Days (Talking Elephant, 2003)

On Amazing Blondel albums

- Going Where the Music Takes Me (Shakedown, 2004)

On Anna Ryder albums

- Paper Girl (RowdyMusic, 2004)

With PJ Wright

- Galileo's Apology (Matty Grooves, 2007)

On Steve Tilston albums

- Reaching Back: the Life & Music of Steve Tilston (Free Reed, 2007)

On Ric Sanders albums

- Still Waters (Talking Elephant, 2008)

On Deborah Bonham albums

- Duchess (Warner, 2008)

On Tim Moon album

- Invicta (Inside Motion, due for release 2010)

On Red Shoes album

- Ring Around The Land (Cedarwood Records, 2009)

On The Bar-Steward Sons of Val Doonican album

- Rugh & Ryf (Moon-On-A-Stick Records, 2022)
