= Ship to Shore (Nigel Mazlyn Jones album) =

Studio album by Nigel Mazlyn Jones
- Released: 1976
- Recorded: 1976
- Genre: Folk
- Label: Isle Of Light / Kissing Spell
- Producer: Nigel Mazlyn Jones

Nigel Mazlyn Jones chronology
Ship to Shore (1976)	Breaking Cover (1977)

Ship to Shore is the first album by Nigel Mazlyn Jones, guitarist, singer and songwriter. The guitar style and sound, involving use of harmonics and extensive electronic treatments, is already fully formed. The album was recorded in March 1976 in Birmingham at Nest Studios, produced by Nigel Mazlyn Jones and engineered by Jake Commander and Kim Holmes. It features contributions by then-members of Decameron, Madrigal and Steve Ashley's band.

The album was reissued on CD in 2002 on Kissing Spell (KSCD 942), with additional tracks in the form of early recordings of songs intended for the LP but for which the vinyl LP format did not allow space.

Jones' Dudley roots are evinced by an LP sleeve credit to "Jack and Bob at Modern Music", the proprietors of a now defunct music shop in Castle Hill well known to all Midland musicians of the time.

== Track listing ==
All tracks composed by Nigel Mazlyn Jones.

1. "A Singularly Fine Day" – 5:20
2. "Take Me Home" – 6:22
3. "The Man and the Deer" – 5:36
4. "Follow Every Sunset" – 3:45
5. "How High the Moon" – 3:30
6. "Reality" – 3:43
7. "Port Quin Song (The Lady On the Beach)" – 3:41
8. "Ship to Shore" – 12:10

Additional tracks on the CD reissue:

1. "All Brave Men"
2. "The Hunter and the Lady"
3. "Hunter's Tale"
4. "Ships' Tales"
5. "Neap Tide"
6. "High Tide"
7. "Frozen Waves"

== Personnel ==
- Nigel Mazlyn Jones – guitars, bass, waves, vocals
- Dik Cadbury – basses, vocals
- Johnny Coppin – guitar, vocals
- Alleyn Menzies – drums
- Jerry Riley – guitar
- Rob Lloyd – guitar, mandolin
- Martin Mitchell – violin

Additional personnel listed on CD reissue:

- Dave Titley – acoustic 6 string guitar, pottery drum
- Graham Horncy – bass
- Alan Appleby – bass
