= The Family of Man (Karl Dallas song) =

Song by Karl Dallas
- Written: 1955
- Genre: Folk
- Songwriter(s): Karl Dallas

The Family of Man is a song written in 1955 by Karl Dallas, under the name Fred Dallas. It was inspired by Dallas' visit to a touring photography exhibition, The Family of Man, when it visited the Royal Festival Hall in London.

It was recorded by The Spinners, with the Oxford Dictionary of National Biography 2005-2008 entry for the band's Cliff Hall saying:

the group became synonymous with contemporary songs such as 'Dirty Old Town' (by Ewan MacColl). 'In My Liverpool Home' (by Pete McGovern), 'Black and White' (by Earl Robinson), and 'The Family of Man' (by Karl Dallas).

It was also recorded by the London Youth Choir for their "Songs from Aldermaston" EP; by Bitter Withy, and by Colin Wilkie & Shirley Hart. The song has also been included in school song books and hymn books. A choral arrangement was made by the composer Alan Bush.
