= Mike Silver (musician) =

British singer-songwriter (born 1945)

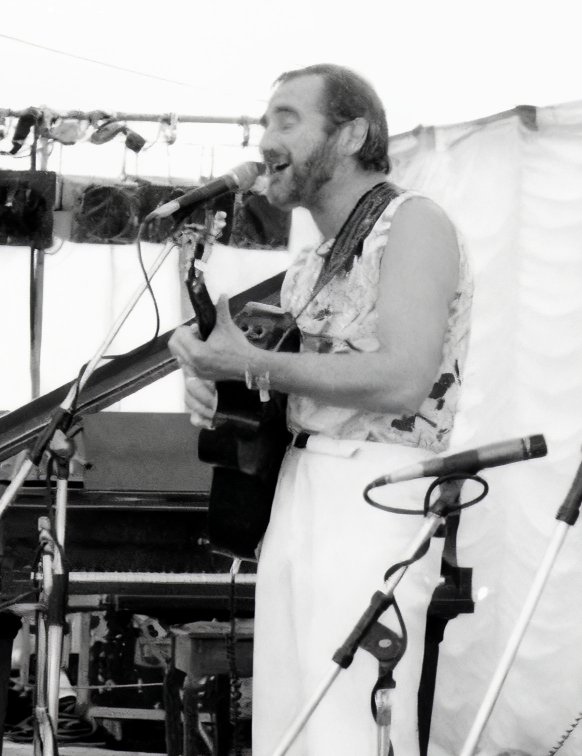
- Silver in 1985

Background information
- Born: 12 September 1945 (age 80); Uffington, Oxfordshire, England
- Genres: Folk
- Occupations: Singer, Songwriter
- Instruments: Guitar, Piano
- Years active: 1968—present
- Labels: Rocket, Stockfisch, Big John, Ferry, Peak, Silversound, Faymus
- Website: www.mikesilver.co.uk

Mike Silver (born 12 September 1945) is a British singer-songwriter, who has been active in the UK contemporary and folk music circuits since the late 1960s.

== Biography ==
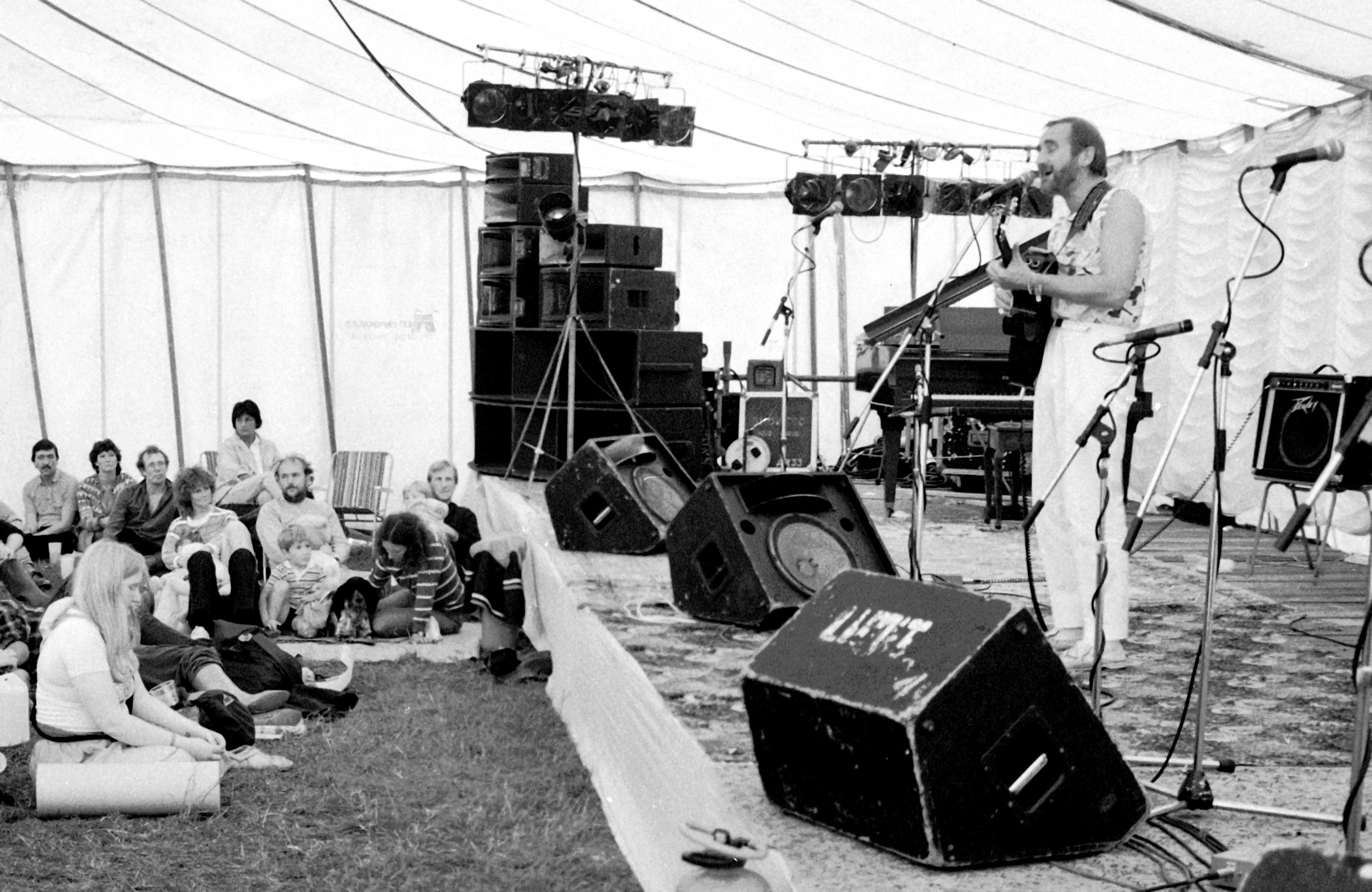
Silver performing at Trowbridge Festival, 1985

Silver was born in Uffington, Oxfordshire (then Berkshire) in 1945 and started playing guitar at the age of 15, joining a number of locally-known "beat" groups in the Croydon area from around 1964 onwards. He was inspired to move to a more fingerstyle folk/blues approach after witnessing Gerry Lockran at a Canterbury folk club, and began performing himself in the folk clubs of London and Cornwall from the late 1960s onwards. In 1971, he formed the trio, Daylight, together with Chrissie Quayle and Steve Hayton, an American then resident in the UK, which produced one album for RCA in 1971, but fell somewhat between the folk and rock camps and eventually foundered. Following this, Silver signed as the first solo artist other than John to Elton John's Rocket Record Company and released the album Troubadour in 1973, also touring in the US as support to Dory Previn and Ashford and Simpson. From 1976 onwards, Silver concentrated his activities as an acoustic performer and singer-songwriter on the UK folk scene, with frequent performing trips also to Denmark and Germany, and has released more than 12 further solo albums (on some he is billed as Michael Silver); his song "Maybe It's Just Love" was also picked up by Moody Blues frontman Justin Hayward, and included on the latter's 1980 album, Night Flight.

Currently based in Camelford, Cornwall, Silver continues to perform around the UK folk circuit and has also collaborated with fellow performer and songwriter Johnny Coppin, including the release of a joint album, Breaking the Silence (2007). Writing in the West Briton in 2003, reviewer John Newman has stated: "Mike Silver has a unique style, drawing from many influences including folk, rock, country and blues, all of which are evident, with an end result that is magical and should be a source of inspiration to songwriters everywhere."

== Discography ==
=== Mike Silver ===
- Troubadour Rocket MCA 348 1973 album details
- Come and Be My Lady Stockfisch SF 7002 1976 album details
- as Michael Silver: Midnight Train Big John BIG 001 1979 album details
- as Michael Silver: Silversongs Ferry Records F 29115 1981 album details
- as Michael Silver: Let's Talk About You Peak 3381 1983 album details
- Free Silversound SR 0184 1985 album details
- No Machine Silversound SR 0286 1987 album details
- Roadworks Silversound SR 0190 1990 (live recordings) album details
- Heartland Faymus FR 0197 1997 album details
- Double Back (compilation) Faymus FRCD 0299 1999 album details
- Ku Séma Faymus FRCD 0100 2000 album details
- Solid Silver D.M.G. DMGCD 001 2003 album details
- Heaven In Mind Cherry Red C-RED 298 2006 album details
- How Many Rivers Faymus FRCD 0108 2009 album details
- Jack Dances Faymus FRCD 0112 2014 album details
- Silver Collection Faymus FRCD 1015 2016 album details

=== With others ===
- Mike Silver and Mike Beason: The Applicant Fontana STL 5506 1969 album details
- "Daylight" (Mike Silver, Steve Hayton, Chrissie Quayle): Daylight RCA SF 8194 1971 album details
- Johnny Coppin and Mike Silver: Breaking The Silence Faymus FRCD 0101 2007 album details
