= Johnny Coppin =

- Born: John Coppin; 5 April 1946 (age 80); Woodford, Essex, England
- Origin: Cheltenham, Gloucestershire, England
- Genre: Folk
- Occupations: Singer, songwriter, composer, broadcaster
- Instruments: Guitar, piano
- Years active: 1968—present
- Labels: Vertigo, Rola, Avada, Red Sky
- Website: johnnycoppin.co.uk

John "Johnny" Coppin (born 5 April 1946) is an English singer-songwriter, composer, poetry anthologist and broadcaster. He plays guitar and piano and has written and recorded many albums as a solo artist. He has a weekly one-hour show on BBC Radio Gloucestershire entitled, Folk Roots, which he has produced and presented every week since 1996. Coppin has been the musical director for the Festival Players since 1992.

== Early years ==
He was born in Woodford, Essex, England. He attended Churchfields Junior School. Coppin formed his first band, The Shifters, with cousin Martin Wright on bass, Neil Dunwoody on guitar, and Howard Jones on drums in 1959. Their first public performance was at the United Reformed Church Hall in Woodford Green. Eddie Broadbridge joined band as lead singer and they renamed themselves as Eddie and the Shifters. In 1966, while studying architecture at the Gloucestershire College of Art in Cheltenham, he formed Love to Mother with Al Fenn on guitar, Tom Bennison on bass and Mike Ketskemety on drums.

== Decameron ==
Coppin first came to prominence as one of the founding members of Decameron. The band was originally formed as a duo with Dave Bell (vocals, guitar, bass guitar, percussion) in 1968 and Coppin and Bell wrote most of Decameron's songs throughout their existence. Decameron became a four piece in 1969 with the addition of former Love to Mother bandmate Fenn (vocals, guitar, mandoline) and Geoff March (vocals, cello, fiddle, keyboards) the following year.

When Coppin, Fenn and March graduated from university, Decameron went fully professional and were signed by the Fingimigig Agency run by Jasper Carrott and John Starkey. After much touring, the band recorded their first album Say Hello to the Band in 1973. The same year Dik Cadbury (vocals, bass guitar, 12 string guitar) joined to complete the classic line-up. They also appeared on rare occasions using their alter-egos, The Magnificent Mercury Brothers, playing mostly covers of Beach Boys and Jan and Dean songs, featuring the rich vocal harmonies that Decameron were famous for.

Over the next three years, Decameron released one album per year and toured extensively. Due to a lack of sufficient commercial success the band decided to call it a day, and their final gig was in Southsea on 4 July 1976. Since then they have reformed for occasional one-off reunion gigs, usually with Mick Candler on drums, and recorded a live album, Afterwords, in 2001 in benefit of Coppin's wife, Gillian, who died from ovarian cancer just a few months later.

== Solo ==
Coppin formed his own band in 1977 with Phil Beer (guitar, fiddle, vocals), Steve Hutt (bass, vocals), Candler (drums) and Tony Bennett (guitar, vocals). With these musicians he collaborated with Nigel Mazlyn Jones on his 1976 Ship To Shore and 1979 Sentinel albums. Coppin's first album was a solo effort, Roll On Dreamer (1978).

In December 1978 and between December 1979 and January 1980, Coppin was the musical director for Joseph and the Amazing Technicolor Dreamcoat at the Everyman Theatre in Cheltenham. Anthony Head played Joseph and also made contributions to Coppin's second album, No Going Back, which was a band effort.

After three albums of original songs, Coppin found a rich vein of material when he decided to set poems written by famous Gloucestershire authors to music. His first effort, The Roads Go Down, had been included on his first solo album. Coppin's first full album of Gloucestershire poems set to music, Forest and Vale and High Blue Hill, was premiered at the 1983 Cheltenham Literary Festival. Coppin has chosen poems from writers such as Ivor Gurney, F. W. Harvey, Eva Dobell, and Frank Mansell. Perhaps the most famous poet whose work Coppin has set to music is Laurie Lee, and they collaborated on the album, Edge of Day.

Coppin's subsequent work has included completely original work as well as further albums based on the Gloucestershire theme. Most albums have at least one song where Coppin has taken lyrical content and added his musical interpretation.

His television appearances include his own programme Song of Gloucestershire for the BBC, Stars in a Dark Night for Channel 4, and Music Writers on TV for HTV, while his radio work includes Kaleidoscope for Radio 4, West Country Christmas, the Arts Programme and Folk on Two for Radio 2, as well as many appearances on British local radio shows.

His music for theatre includes Songs on Lonely Roads (the story of composer/poet Ivor Gurney) with David Goodland, The Shrewsbury Theatre Guild's production of Arthur's Plough, as well as writing and directing the music for the Festival Players Theatre Company, and their touring productions of William Shakespeare's works, which culminated in the Three Choirs Festival. He has edited two poetry anthologies: Forest & Vale & High Blue Hill and Between the Severn and the Wye – poems from the border counties of England and Wales. His third book was A Country Christmas, a collections of prose, poetry, carols, songs and folklore.

Coppin's BBC Radio Gloucestershire show, Folk Roots, was the fifth most listened to BBC Local Radio programme broadcast through the internet, with over 5,000 people listening per week.

In 2008, he was elected as honorary president of Glosfolk, the organisation that promotes traditional music in the county, for his services to folk music over many years.

== Albums ==
=== Decameron ===
- Say Hello to the Band (1973)
- Mammoth Special (1974)
- Third Light (1975)
- Tomorrow's Pantomime (1976)
- Afterwords (2001)

=== Solo ===
- Roll On Dreamer (1978)
- No Going Back (1979)
- Get Lucky (1982)
- Forest and Vale and High Blue Hill (1983)
- Line of Blue (1985)
- English Morning (1987)
- Edge of Day with Laurie Lee (1989)
- The Glorious Glosters (1990)
- Songs on Lonely Roads (1990)
- Songs and Carols for a West Country Christmas (1991)
- Force of the River (1993)
- The Gloucestershire Collection (1994)
- A Country Christmas (1995)
- The Shakespeare Songs (1997)
- A Journey – compilation (2001)
- Keep the Flame EP with Paul Burgess and Mick Dolan (2004)
- The Winding Stair (2005)
- Breaking the Silence with Mike Silver (2007)
- Borderland (2014)
- All on a Winter's Night (2017)
- 30 Songs – 2 CD compilation (2019)
- Midwinter – live album (2020)
- River of Dreams (2022)

== Singles ==
=== The Magnificent Mercury Brothers ===
- "The New Girl in School" / "Why Do Fools Fall in Love?" / "What About Us?" (1975)

=== Solo ===
- "Believe in You" b/w "Run to Her" (1980)
- "We Shall Not Pass" (1980)
- "Everybody Knows" (1982)
- "Keep the Flame" (digital download, 2011)

== Books ==
- Forest and Vale and High Blue Hill (1991)
- Between the Severn and the Wye (1993)
- A Country Christmas (1997)

== Festival Players Productions ==
Coppin was musical director and wrote the songs and music for these summer touring productions

- Merry Wives of Windsor (1992)
- Much Ado About Nothing (1994)
- A Winter's Tale (1995)
- The Merchant of Venice (1996)
- As You Like It (1997)
- A Midsummer Night's Dream (1998)
- Romeo and Juliet (2002)
- Comedy of Errors (2003)
- Twelfth Night (2004)
- A Midsummer Night's Dream (2005)
- Hamlet (2006)
- As You Like It (2007)
- Much Ado About Nothing (2008)
- The Merchant of Venice (2009)
- The Taming of the Shrew (2011)
- Twelfth Night (2012)
- Romeo and Juliet (2013)
- A Midsummer Night's Dream (2013)
- A Comedy of Errors (2014)
- Macbeth (2014)
- As You Like It (2015)
- Hamlet (2016)
- The Merry Wives of Windsor (2017)
- The Winter's Tale (2018)
- Much Ado About Nothing (2019)
