= Get Lucky (Johnny Coppin album) =

Studio album by Johnny Coppin
- Released: 1982
- Recorded: 1982
- Genre: Folk rock
- Label: Starward
- Producer: Johnny Coppin

Get Lucky is a folk/rock album by Johnny Coppin released in 1982, his third solo album.

The album was produced by Mark Tibenham and Johnny Coppin and engineered by Mark Tibenham. It was recorded and mixed at Zella Studios, Birmingham, except 'Everybody Knows', which was recorded and mixed at Old Smithy Studios, Worcestershire.

Get Lucky was originally released by Starward Records as a vinyl LP, catalogue number SWL 2003 with sleeve artwork by Tony Price Studios and photography by Pete Seaward. The mastering for the original album was by George "Porky" Peckham, and the runout bears the distinctive "A Porky Prime Cut" inscription, as well as an additional annotation "Tuggin' at the heartstrings..." . It has never been released on CD, though some tracks have appeared on subsequent Coppin compilations.

== Track listing ==
All composed by Johnny Coppin unless otherwise noted

1. "New Day"
2. "Get Lucky" (Johnny Coppin, Matt Clifford)
3. "First Time Love"
4. "Contrary" (Clifford T. Ward)
5. "Celebrate My Life"
6. "Heaven Knows"
7. "Never Fly Your Way"
8. "Catherine"
9. "For You" (Matt Clifford)
10. "Everybody Knows"

== Personnel ==
- Johnny Coppin - vocals, acoustic guitar, piano
- Mick Dolan - guitar
- Matt Clifford - keyboards
- Steve Dolan - bass guitar
- Mick Candler - drums
- Phil Beer - violin on 'New Day' and 'Celebrate My Life'
