= Decameron (band) =

English band

Decameron were an English folk rock and progressive rock band, existing from 1968 to 1976.

== History ==
Initially formed in 1968 in Cheltenham, Gloucestershire, England, by Johnny Coppin (guitar, vocals) and Dave Bell (guitar, vocals), the band were augmented in 1971 by the addition of Al Fenn on lead guitar and mandolin and Geoff March on violin and cello. Their first managers included future comedian Jasper Carrott. They originally signed to Vertigo Records in 1973 and recorded their debut album, Say Hello to the Band, that year. By 1974, the band's line-up changed with Dik Cadbury joining the group on lead and 12-string acoustic guitar and bass. Geoff March incorporated keyboards into his repertoire and the band signed to Mooncrest Records to record the album, Mammoth Special, which showed a turn towards more introspective and progressive material, that was to define their sound for the remaining years of their existence.

Although rumours of a missing album called, Beyond the Light or Beyond the Days circulated, (it was even given a catalog number), most of this material appeared on their third album “Third Light”.

In 1975, now on Transatlantic Records, Third Light, was produced by Tom Allom. A year later they added drummer Bob Critchley and released, Tomorrow's Pantomime. The sales were disappointing and Decameron disbanded shortly thereafter.

== Discography ==
- 1973: Say Hello to the Band
- 1974: Mammoth Special
- 1975: Third Light
- 1976: Tomorrow's Pantomime

The first album has also been re-released on CD as a single disc with nine extra previously unreleased tracks. The latter three albums have since been reissued in full on a double-CD anthology entitled Parabola Road.

They collaborated with Nigel Mazlyn Jones on his 1976 album, Ship to Shore.
