= Nigel Mazlyn Jones =

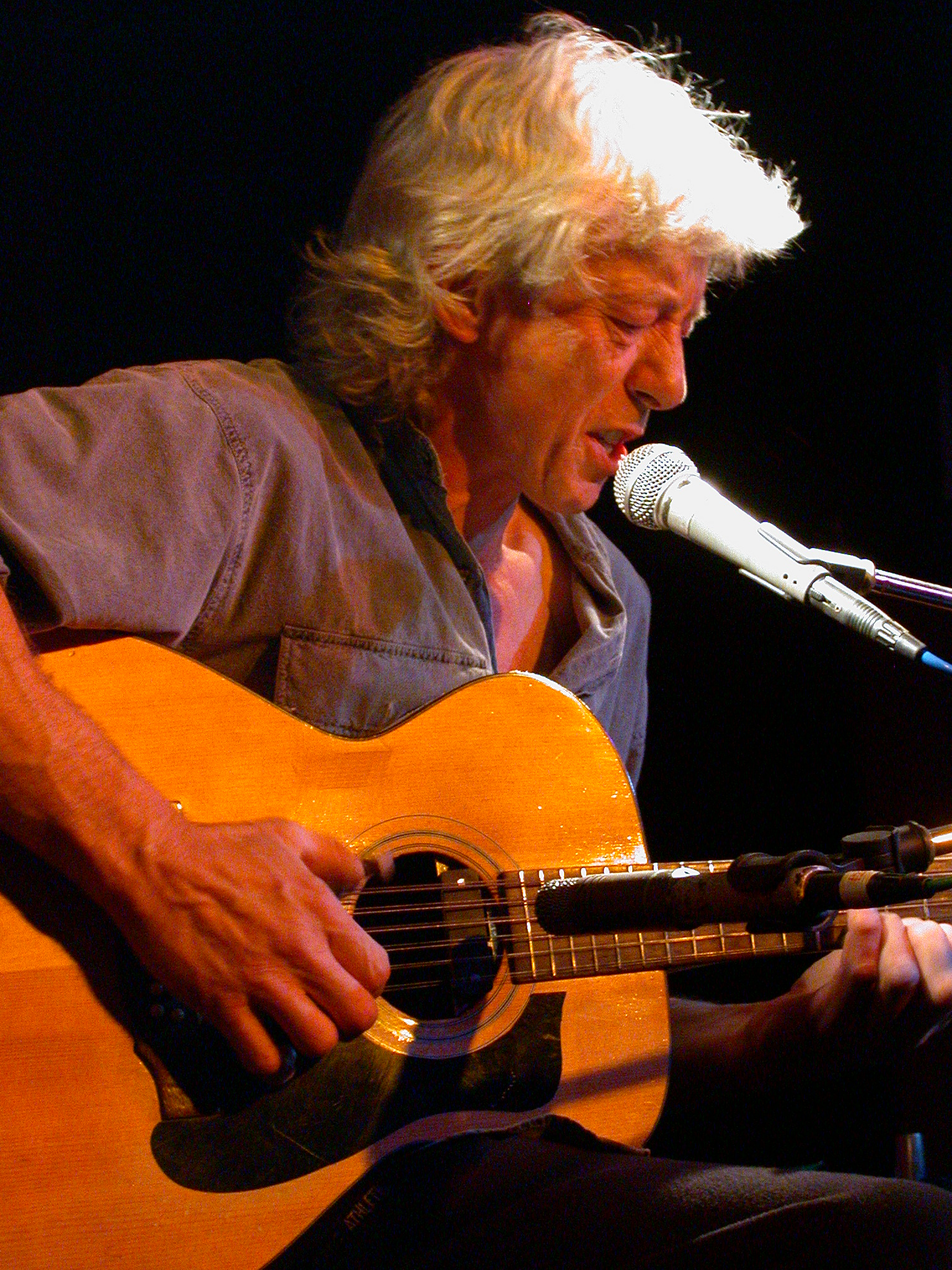
- Nigel Mazlyn Jones in concert in Birmingham in May 2004

Background information
- Born: 26 June 1950 (age 75); Dudley, Worcestershire, England
- Genres: Folk rock
- Occupation: Musician
- Instruments: 12 and 6 string guitar
- Years active: 1972–present
- Labels: Isle of Light, Voiceprint
- Website: nigelmazlynjones.com

Nigel Mazlyn Jones (born 26 June 1950) is an English guitarist, singer and songwriter.

== Early life ==
He was born in Dudley, Worcestershire, England, where he did part-time work at Dudley Zoo from the age of 12. In 1969, he moved to Jersey, to work full-time with the apes at Jersey Zoo (now Durrell Wildlife Park), but "watching people watching animals taught me conservation in the wild is essential" and relocated to north Cornwall, to make his living as a musician.

He has been an active campaigner on local community issues in Cornwall, notably as part of the Lowermoor Support Group for people affected by the Camelford water pollution incident.

== Music ==
Jones most often appears as a solo performer, but he has collaborated with many notable musicians, including Guy Evans of Van der Graaf Generator, Roy Harper, (he plays guitar and dulcimer on Harper's 1990 album Once), Banco de Gaia, Steve Jolliffe of Tangerine Dream, Steve Hillage and Nik Turner from Hawkwind.

== Discography ==
- Ship to Shore (1976 LP/2002 CD reissue has 23 minutes of previously unreleased material)
- Sentinel and the Fools of the Finest Degree (1979 LP/2009 CD reissue has six bonus tracks)
- Breaking Cover (1982 vinyl LP/CD reissue)
- Water From The Well (1987 Cassette only)
- Mazlyn Jones (1991 live vinyl LP/Cassette)
- Angels Over Water (1993 Instrumental CD)
- Mazlyn Jones & Friends - Live, with Guy Evans & Nik Turner (1997 Live CD)
- Behind the Stone (1999 songs CD)
- Planet For $ale (2007 songs CD)
- Raft (2014 songs CD)

== Videography ==
- Beyond This Point (live; video only)

== Appearances on other albums ==
- Roll On Dreamer (1978) – Johnny Coppin (1978 vinyl LP/2009 CD reissue) - Jones plays 12 string guitar on the track "Archangel".
- Once (1990) – Roy Harper - Jones plays guitar and dulcimer.
- Big Men Cry: 20th Anniversary Edition (2017) – Banco de Gaia - Appears on track 11. "Big Men Cry" (Nigel Mazlyn Jones Version) 05:57.
