= Karl Dallas =

British singer-songwriter (1931–2016)

- Born: Karl Frederick Dallas; 29 January 1931; Acton, London, England
- Died: 21 June 2016 (aged 85); Bradford, West Yorkshire, England
- Other name: Fred Dallas
- Occupations: Journalist, musician, author, playwright, peace campaigner, record producer, broadcaster
- Website: www.karldallas.com

Karl Frederick Dallas (29 January 1931 – 21 June 2016) was a British journalist, musician, author, playwright, peace campaigner, record producer, and broadcaster. He was described as "the most vigorous, influential, and informed folk music journalist in Britain".

== Biography ==
=== Early life ===
Dallas was brought up in a communist household, and was named after Karl Marx and Friedrich Engels. His father Jack Dallas was an ex Scots Guardsman and a founder member of the Communist Party of Great Britain (CPGB). Karl lived as a child in Whitley Bay, Northumberland, and later attended Bec School in Tooting, London. He had a half sister Kathleen and like her joined the CPGB. He started writing poetry, and writing and performing songs in London in his teens, using the name Fred Dallas. His songs have been recorded by The Spinners (The Family of Man, written in 1955, after Dallas saw the exhibition of the same name), Ewan MacColl, June Tabor and others. He also contributed music reviews to the St Marylebone Record and Musical Opinion magazine.

=== Journalism and public relations ===
In 1957 Dallas began working as a full-time reporter, later becoming a freelance writer on music – including pop, jazz, classical and folk music – and fashion. Many of his articles were published in the Melody Maker; he also wrote for The Times, The Independent, and many magazines. He published his own magazines, including Folk Music, Folk News, and Jazz Music News, and in 1967 wrote his first book, Swinging London: a guide to where the action is. His other books included Singers of an Empty Day: last sacraments for the superstars (1972), The Cruel Wars: 100 soldiers' songs from Agincourt to Ulster (1972), One Hundred Songs of Toil: 450 Years of Workers' Songs (1974) and The Electric Muse: The Story of Folk into Rock (with Dave Laing, Robin Denselow and Robert Shelton, 1975). For a time he ran his own public relations agency, with clients including Pan Books, Topic Records, and Billy Smart's Circus. He worked as a record producer for the Transatlantic, Island and Sonet labels, and as a concert promoter. From the late 1970s he also wrote on information technology, and contributed articles to most British computer magazines.

=== Later life ===
He was a lifelong atheist until converting to Anglican Christianity in 1983. He moved with his wife to live in Bradford in 1989, and retired from full-time journalism in 1999. He became chairman of Bradford Community Health Council, and, in 2003, travelled to Iraq in a double-decker bus as part of the group of campaigners intending to act as human shields in the event of invasion. Following his return, he wrote Into the War Zone, which he described as a "musical tragicomedy" satirising his experiences as a human shield in Iraq. The play was performed by the Writers Company in Bradford in 2005.

He wrote several other plays, including a seven-hour play on the life of Stalin, as well as several books, including The Fourth Step, described as "a thriller of the international drugs trade", and Good News for the Last Times (2010), a "prophetic vision for the 21st century" based on his religious experiences. A book of his critical writings, The Lie That Tells The Truth, was published in 2012. In later life he continued to broadcast regularly for Bradford Community Broadcasting, and reviewed books, music and films for the Morning Star daily newspaper.

== Death and legacy ==
He died at the age of 85 on 21 June 2016, after being diagnosed with terminal cancer four months earlier. His funeral was held in the parish church of St Paul in Manningham, Bradford on 30 June. He was then buried at a woodland site in the city.

Obituaries were published by The Guardian and the Morning Star, the latter including a fond reminiscence from Arlo Guthrie.
