= Rock'n'Reel =

British music magazine

- Editor: Sean McGhee
- Categories: Music/Entertainment
- Frequency: Bi-monthly
- Publisher: Terra Nova Magazines Limited
- Founded: 1988
- Country: United Kingdom
- Language: English
- Website: Official site

RNR is a music magazine published bi-monthly in the United Kingdom. It was launched in 1988 as Rock'n'Reel, changing its name to R2 in early 2009 and adopting the current title in 2017.

== Content ==
The original Rock’n’Reel was a pocket-sized fanzine of modest ambitions. Since its relaunch in 2007 as an A4 format, full-colour glossy magazine, the magazine has greatly extended its scope and readership. RNR’s coverage of the music scene now encompasses both classic and contemporary rock plus established and emerging talents from the worlds of roots, blues, folk, Americana, singer-songwriter and world music.

RNR claims that its uniqueness lies in truly reflecting the enthusiasms of its writers and readers on the page. Independent contributors, all freelancers, aim to offer an informed, intelligent and unbiased view of the UK and international music scenes, and the magazine prides itself on being neither ‘a fickle follower of musical fashion nor a mere major-label mouthpiece.’

A typical issue contains new CD and DVD release details, artist updates and festival news, alongside an extensive review section, articles and interview features. Regular items include ‘First Takes’ (a round-up of new bands and singer-songwriters), ‘It Started With A Disc’ (RNR writers on how their love of music began), 'Inside Job' (industry feedback), 'Venues We Love' and 'View From The Web'.

Each issue of RNR also includes an exclusive cover-mounted CD featuring a selection of tracks, mostly by emerging artists. Marketed as offering an alternative to what is available elsewhere from the ‘common herd’, these discs carry the series title UN-HERD.
