= Market Square Records =

British record label

Market Square Records was a music promotion and record label company, which operated between 1999 and 2020 based in Buckingham, England. It released the back catalogues of British folk artists and expanded into other genres such as rock, blues and jazz, the latter on its Dusk Fire Records label, which it launched in 2004.

Artists associated with these two labels include Neil Ardley, Steve Ashley, Kevin Ayers, Kuljit Bhamra, Michael Chapman, Rod Clements, Design, Donovan, Ollie Halsall, Jack The Lad, Bert Jansch, Sonja Kristina, Linda Lewis, Lindisfarne, Eleanor McEvoy, New Jazz Orchestra, Nirvana, Howard Riley, Steve Tilston, Pierre Tubbs, Peter Ulrich and Norma Winstone.

== See also ==
- List of record labels
