= KLOF Magazine =

Online music magazine

KLOF Mag
- Website type: Online music magazine
- Available in: English
- Creator: Alex Gallacher
- Website: klofmag.com
- Launched: June 2004
- Current status: Active

KLOF Magazine (formerly Folk Radio UK) is an independent online music and culture magazine founded in June 2004 by Alex Gallacher. Originally launched as an internet radio station and webzine focused on folk music, it has since evolved into a broad-ranging publication covering experimental music, ambient music, jazz, avant-garde, and folk music from around the world. The magazine is based in the United Kingdom.

== History ==
Folk Radio UK was founded in June 2004 and operated as a continuous-stream internet radio broadcast alongside a written webzine. In February 2011, the station was recommended by The Guardian, with journalist Elisabeth Mahoney describing it in the paper's G2 supplement as "back-to-back music of the most gentle, serene sort, and a marvellous companion for a few hours."

The station ceased live broadcasting in June 2013, transitioning fully to an on-demand and magazine format due to increasing costs. The publication continued to produce regular audio content in the form of mixtapes and recorded shows, hosted on Mixcloud. The publication was subsequently renamed KLOF Magazine, reflecting its expanded editorial scope beyond folk music and its origins as a UK-only broadcaster. The former website address folkradio.co.uk redirects to klofmag.com.

Folk Radio UK was featured in The Independent in 2015 as part of a wider feature on independent online radio and music publishing.

== Content ==
KLOF Magazine publishes album reviews, artist interviews, news, and music features, alongside curated mixtapes and playlists, covering a wide range of genres, including folk, roots, experimental, ambient, jazz, avant-garde, and global music.

The magazine hosts a recurring feature called Off the Shelf, in which musicians photograph and discuss objects from their own homes. Guest articles written by musicians are also a regular feature of the publication.

== Recognition ==
Folk Radio UK was recommended by The Guardian in February 2011, by journalist Elisabeth Mahoney in the paper's G2 supplement. The publication has also been featured in The Independent and The Big Issue.

WOMEX, the global world music industry network, lists Folk Radio UK as a recommended music publication, noting endorsements from BBC 6 Music presenter Tom Robinson and BBC Radio 3 Late Junction presenter Fiona Talkington.

In June 2024, Colin Meloy, lead singer and songwriter of The Decemberists, selected KLOF Magazine's newsletter as one of his top Substack recommendations in Substack Reads, Substack's official weekly digest. Meloy described the publication as producing "superb mixtapes and playlists", writing that KLOF founder Alex Gallacher "clearly has a healthy record collection and an unwavering curiosity about all kinds of music", and crediting the publication as the source of "most of the music I've loved over the past couple years."
