= Sandy Denny discography =

- Studio albums: 4
- Extended plays: 1
- Live albums: 2
- Compilation albums: 15
- Singles: 4
- Collaborations: 2

The Sandy Denny discography chronicles the output of British folk rock singer Sandy Denny. Her brief career, spanning 1967 to 1978, saw the release of 4 solo albums and 4 singles on several record labels.

Denny was the lead singer of the group Fairport Convention, and fronted the band through several of their most highly regarded albums: What We Did on Our Holidays, Unhalfbricking, and Liege & Lief were all released by the band during 1969, and are today considered touchstones in the progression of British folk rock. Fairport guitarist and songwriter Richard Thompson would prove to be an important collaborator in Denny's life, and he would go on to perform guitar duties on each of her solo albums.

In addition to her work with Fairport Convention, Denny was also a member of The Strawbs, Fotheringay and The Bunch. Other notable recordings include her duet with Robert Plant on Led Zeppelin's "The Battle of Evermore", as well as a brief appearance on a live version of The Who's Tommy. She has received a number of awards and accolades from different organizations.

== Solo ==
=== Studio albums ===
Year	Album	UK Albums Chart
1971	The North Star Grassman and the Ravens	31
1972	Sandy	-
1974	Like an Old Fashioned Waltz	-
1977	Rendezvous	-

=== Live albums ===
Year	Album	UK Albums Chart
1998	Gold Dust (Live At The Royalty)	-
2011	19 Rupert Street	-

=== Compilation albums ===
Year	Album	UK Albums Chart
1970	It's Sandy Denny	-
1985	Who Knows Where the Time Goes?	-
1987	The Best of Sandy Denny	-
1995	The Attic Tracks 1972-1984	-
1999	Listen Listen - An Introduction to Sandy Denny	-
2000	No More Sad Refrains: The Anthology	-
2002	The Best of Sandy	-
2004	The Collection	-
2004	A Boxful of Treasures	-
2005	Where The Time Goes - Sandy '67	-
2007	Live at the BBC	-
2008	The Best of the BBC Recordings	-
2008	The Music Weaver: Sandy Denny Remembered	-
2010	Sandy Denny	-
2012	The Notes and the Words: A Collection of Demos and Rarities	-
2016	I've Always Kept a Unicorn	-

=== Collaboration albums ===
Year	Album	UK Albums Chart
1967	Alex Campbell and His Friends (with Alex Campbell)	-
1967	Sandy and Johnny (with Johnny Silvo)	-
2012	Don't Stop Singing (with Thea Gilmore)	89

=== Singles ===
Year	Song	UK	Album
1972	"Listen, Listen"	-	Sandy
1974	"Whispering Grass"	-	Like an Old Fashioned Waltz
1974	"Like an Old Fashioned Waltz"	-	Like an Old Fashioned Waltz
1977	"Candle in the Wind"	-	Rendezvous

== With The Strawbs ==
=== Studio albums ===
Year	Album	UK Albums Chart
1973	All Our Own Work (Recorded 1967)	-

=== Reissue ===
Year	Album	UK Albums Chart
1991	Sandy Denny and the Strawbs	-
2010	All Our Own Work - The Complete Sessions Remastered	-

== With Fairport Convention ==
=== Studio albums ===
Year	Album	UK Albums Chart
1968	What We Did on Our Holidays	-
1969	Unhalfbricking	12
1969	Liege & Lief	17
1975	Rising for the Moon	52

=== Live albums ===
Year	Album	UK Albums Chart
1974	Fairport Live Convention	-
1987	Heyday	-
2016	Ebbets Field 1974	-

=== Singles ===
Year	Song	UK	Album
1968	"Meet On The Ledge"	-	Unhalfbricking
1969	"Si Tu Dois Partir"	21	Unhalfbricking
1975	"White Dress"	-	Rising for the Moon

== With Fotheringay ==
=== Studio albums ===
Year	Album	UK Albums Chart
1970	Fotheringay	18
2008	Fotheringay 2	-

=== Live albums ===
Year	Album	UK Albums Chart
2011	Fotheringay Essen 1970	-

=== Compilation albums ===
Year	Album	UK Albums Chart
2015	Nothing More: The Collected Fotheringay	-

=== Singles ===
Year	Song	UK	Album
1970	"Peace In The End"	-	Fotheringay

== With The Bunch ==
=== Studio albums ===
Year	Album	UK Albums Chart
1972	Rock On	-

=== Singles ===
Year	Song	UK	Album
1972	"When Will I Be Loved?"	-	Rock On
1972	"The Loco-Motion"	-	Rock On

== Guest appearances ==
- 1965, Jackson C. Frank's single "Blues Run the Game" (Columbia); Denny plays tambourine (uncredited) on the B-side, "Can't Get Away From My Love".
- 1968, The Young Tradition's album Galleries (Transatlantic TRA 172); piano on track 16, "The Pembroke Unique Ensemble"
- 1970, Stefan Grossman's album The Ragtime Cowboy Jew (Transatlantic) backing vocals in the chorus of "A Pretty Little Tune"
- 1971, Iain Matthews' (then: Ian Matthews) album If You Saw Thro' My Eyes (Vertigo), his first solo album, she duets on the aforementioned track and provides piano, harmonium and backing vocals to three other tracks.
- 1971, "Led Zeppelin IV" where she sings on the song The Battle of Evermore, on a duet with Robert Plant; in the footnotes of that album's sleeve notes, she is credited and has her own rune symbol of three triangles much like the symbols chosen by the other members of Led Zeppelin.
- 1972, four tracks on the soundtrack LP to the film Swedish Fly Girls produced by Manfred Mann Water Mother, What Will I Do With Tomorrow, Are The Judges Sane? and I Need You. Denny's tracks were recorded in 1969 at Maximum Sound.
- 1972, two tracks, "Here In Silence" and "Man of Iron" for the film Pass of Arms released as a 7" soundtrack single with picture sleeve.
- 1972, Richard Thompson's album Henry the Human Fly; piano on track 8 and backing vocals on tracks 4 and 5.
- 1972, stage version of the Who's Tommy performed with the London Symphony Orchestra; Denny plays the nurse and sings "It's a Boy"
- 1975, Charlie Drake's "You Never Know" single for Charisma Records (CB270), produced by Peter Gabriel
