= Sandy Denny (box set) =

Box set by Sandy Denny
- Released: 22 November 2010
- Recorded: 1967 – 1977
- Genre: Folk rock
- Label: Universal Music
- Producer: various

Sandy Denny chronology
Live at the BBC (2007)	Sandy Denny (2010)

Professional ratings
Review scores
Source	Rating
Classic Rock	10/10 stars

Sandy Denny is a 2010 compilation box set of recordings by folk singer Sandy Denny and comprises all studio material and recordings made during her time both as a solo artist and as a member of Fotheringay, Fairport Convention, and other groups, together with home demos and live recordings. It was the brainchild of Universal Music's marketing manager Sue Armstrong who worked closely with the Estate of Sandy Denny to create the definitive collection of Sandy's work.

== Track listing ==
The box set contains the following tracks:

=== Disc 1 ===
==== Alex Campbell and his Friends ====
1. "The False Bride"
2. "You Never Wanted Me"
3. "This Train"

==== Sandy and Johnny ====
1. "Milk and Honey"
2. "The Last Thing on My Mind"
3. "The 3:10 to Yuma"
4. "Make Me a Pallet on Your Floor"
5. "Pretty Polly"
6. "Been on the Road So Long"
7. "My Ramblin’ Boy"

==== It's Sandy Denny ====
1. "The 3.10 to Yuma"
2. "Pretty Polly"
3. "Milk and Honey"
4. "The Last Thing on My Mind"
5. "Make Me a Pallet on Your Floor"

=== Disc 2 ===
==== All Our Own Work - Sandy Denny and The Strawbs ====
1. "On My Way"
2. "Who Knows Where the Time Goes?"
3. "Tell Me What You See in Me"
4. "Stay Awhile with Me"
5. "All I Need Is You"
6. "Sail Away to the Sea"
7. "And You Need Me"

==== Sandy Denny and The Strawbs (1991 re-issue with strings) ====
1. "Nothing Else Will Do" (Sandy lead vocal)
2. "Who Knows Where the Time Goes?" (strings)
3. "And You Need Me" (strings)
4. "Tell Me What You See in Me" (added sitar)
5. "Stay Awhile with Me" (strings)
6. "Two Weeks Last Summer"

==== Swedish Fly Girls (film soundtrack) ====
1. "Water Mother"
2. "What Will I Do Tomorrow?"
3. "Are the Judges Sane?"
4. "I Need You"

=== Disc 3 ===
==== What We Did on Our Holidays - Fairport Convention ====
1. "Fotheringay"
2. "Mr Lacey"
3. "Book Song"
4. "The Lord Is in This Place"
5. "I'll Keep It with Mine"
6. "Eastern Rain"
7. "Nottamun Town"
8. "She Moves Through the Fair"
9. "Meet on the Ledge"

==== Unhalfbricking - Fairport Convention ====
1. "Genesis Hall
2. "Si Tu Dois Partir"
3. "Autopsy"
4. "A Sailor's Life"
5. "Cajun Woman"
6. "Who Knows Where the Time Goes"
7. "Percy's Song"
8. "Million Dollar Bash"

==== Bonus tracks ====
1. "Mr Lacey" - Unreleased (Sandy lead vocal)
2. "Autopsy" - Unreleased (alternate take)

=== Disc 4 ===
==== Liege & Lief - Fairport Convention ====
1. "Come All Ye"
2. "Reynardine"
3. "Matty Groves"
4. "Farewell Farewell"
5. "The Deserter"
6. "Tam Lin"
7. "Crazy Man Michael"

===== Bonus tracks =====
1. "Come All Ye" (take 1)^{unreleased}
2. "Matty Groves" (take 1)^{unreleased}

=== Disc 5 ===
==== Fotheringay - Fotheringay ====
1. "Nothing More"
2. "The Sea"
3. "Winter Winds"
4. "Peace in the End"
5. "The Way I Feel"
6. "Pond and the Stream"
7. "Banks of the Nile"

==== Fotheringay 2 - Fotheringay ====
1. "John the Gun"
2. "Eppy Moray"
3. "Wild Mountain Thyme"
4. "Late November"
5. "Gypsy Davey"
6. "Silver Threads and Golden Needles"
7. "Two Weeks Last Summer"
8. "Gypsy Davey" (Joe Boyd mix)
9. "Late November" (Joe Boyd mix)
10. "Two Weeks Last Summer" (Joe Boyd mix)

=== Disc 6 ===
==== The North Star Grassman and the Ravens ====
1. "Late November"
2. "Blackwaterside"
3. "The Sea Captain"
4. "Down in the Flood"
5. "John the Gun"
6. "Next Time Around"
7. "The Optimist"
8. "Let's Jump the Broomstick"
9. "Wretched Wilbur"
10. "Northstar Grassman and the Ravens"
11. "Crazy Lady Blues"

===== Bonus tracks =====
1. "Late November" (El Pea version)
2. "Blackwaterside" (Alternate take)^{unreleased}
3. "Next Time Around" (Alternate take without strings)

==== Rock On - The Bunch ====
1. "That'll Be the Day"
2. "Love’s Made a Fool of You"
3. "Willie and the Hand Jive"
4. "When Will I Be Loved?"
5. "Learning the Game"

=== Disc 7 ===
==== Sandy ====
1. "It’ll Take a Long Time"
2. "Sweet Rosemary"
3. "For Nobody to Hear"
4. "Tomorrow Is a Long Time"
5. "Quiet Joys of Brotherhood"
6. "Listen, Listen"
7. "The Lady"
8. "Bushes and Briars"
9. "It Suits Me Well"
10. "The Music Weaver"

===== Bonus tracks =====
1. "Ecoute, Ecoute" (Listen, Listen French version)
2. "For Nobody to Hear" (original version)^{unreleased}
3. "The Music Weaver" (without strings)^{unreleased}
4. "Here in Silence" (From the short film Pass of Arms)
5. "Man of Iron" (From the short film Pass of Arms)

=== Disc 8 ===
==== Like an Old Fashioned Waltz ====
1. "Solo"
2. "Like an Old Fashioned Waltz"
3. "Whispering Grass"
4. "Friends"
5. "Carnival"
6. "Dark the Night"
7. "At the End of the Day"
8. "Until The Real Thing Comes Along"
9. "No End"

===== Bonus tracks =====
1. "Solo" (no overdubs)^{unreleased}
2. "Like an Old Fashioned Waltz" (without strings)^{unreleased}
3. "Friends" (Alternate version)^{unreleased}
4. "Dark the night" (Alternate take)^{unreleased}
5. "At the End of the Day" (alternate take w/o strings)
6. "No End" (alternate take w/o strings)^{unreleased}

=== Disc 9 ===
==== Fairport Live Convention (A Moveable Feast) - Fairport Convention ====
1. "Matty Groves" [live]
2. "John the Gun" [live]
3. "Something You Got" [live]
4. "Down in the Flood" [live]
5. "That’ll Be The Day" [live]

==== Rising for the Moon - Fairport Convention ====
1. "Rising for the Moon"
2. "Restless"
3. "White Dress"
4. "Stranger to Himself"
5. "What is True?"
6. "Dawn"
7. "After Halloween"
8. "One More Chance"

===== Bonus tracks =====
1. "White Dress" (Alternate version)^{unreleased}
2. "Dawn" (Alternate version)^{unreleased}
3. "One More Chance" (alternate take)^{unreleased}
4. "Breakfast in Mayfair" (from The Man They Couldn't Hang)

=== Disc 10 ===
==== Rendezvous ====
1. "I Wish I Was a Fool for You"
2. "Gold Dust"
3. "Candle in the Wind"
4. "Take Me Away"
5. "One Way Donkey Ride"
6. "I’m a Dreamer"
7. "All Our Days"
8. "Silver Threads and Golden Needles"
9. "No More Sad Refrains"

===== Bonus tracks =====
1. "Full Moon" (Bonus track on US Hannibal release)
2. "Still Waters Run Deep" (‘Candle in the wind’ b-side)
3. "I’m a Dreamer" (Alternate take without strings)^{unreleased}
4. "All Our Days" (full length version)^{unreleased}
5. "No More Sad Refrains" (without strings)^{unreleased}
6. "Full Moon" (Alternative version feat. Dave Swarbrick solo)^{unreleased}

=== Disc 11 ===
==== Gold Dust: Live at the Royalty ====
1. "I Wish I Was a Fool for You"
2. "Stranger to Himself"
3. "I’m a Dreamer"
4. "Take Me Away"
5. "Nothing More"
6. "The Sea"
7. "The Lady"
8. "Gold Dust"
9. Solo
10. "John the Gun"
11. "It’ll Take a Long Time"
12. "Wretched Wilbur"
13. "Tomorrow Is a Long Time"
14. "The Northstar Grassman and the Ravens"
15. "One More Chance"
16. "No More Sad Refrains"
17. "Who Knows Where the Time Goes"

=== Disc 12 (bonus disc) ===
==== The Early Home Demos ====
1. "Blues Run the Game"^{unreleased}
2. "Milk and Honey"^{unreleased}
3. "Soho"^{unreleased}
4. "It Ain’t Me Babe"^{unreleased}
5. "East Virginia"^{unreleased}
6. "Geordie"
7. "In Memory (The Tender Years)"^{unreleased}
8. "I Love My True Love"^{unreleased}
9. "Let No Man Steal Your Thyme"^{unreleased}
10. ‘Ethusel’ Unknown track^{unreleased}
11. "Carnival"^{unreleased}
12. "Setting of the sun"^{unreleased}
13. "Boxful of Treasures"
14. "They Don’t Seem to Know You"
15. "Gerrard Street"^{unreleased}
16. "Fotheringay"^{unreleased}
17. "She Moves Through the Fair"
18. "The Time Has Come"^{unreleased}
19. "Seven Virgins"^{unreleased}
20. "A Little Bit of Rain"^{unreleased}
21. "Go Your Own Way My Love
22. "Cradle Song"^{unreleased}
23. "Blue Tattoo"^{unreleased}
24. "The Quiet Land of Erin"^{unreleased}
25. "Who Knows Where the Time Goes" (1st demo 1967)^{unreleased}

=== Disc 13 (bonus disc) ===
==== Solo & Fairport Convention ====
1. "Who Knows Where the Time Goes" (2nd demo 1968)^{unreleased}
2. "Motherless Children" (home demo)^{unreleased}
3. "Milk and Honey" (Live BBC, Cellarful of Folk 21/3/67)^{unreleased}
4. "Been on the Road So Long" (Live BBC, My Kind of Folk 26/6/68)^{unreleased}
5. "Quiet Land of Erin" (Live BBC, My Kind of Folk 26/6/68)^{unreleased}
6. "Autopsy" (demo)
7. "Now and Then" (demo)
8. "Fotheringay" (Acoustic version)^{unreleased}
9. "She Moved Through the Fair" (Acoustic version)^{unreleased}
10. "Mr. Lacey" (live BBC, Stuart Henry Show 02/12/68)
11. "Throwaway Street Puzzle"
12. "Ballad of Easy Rider"
13. "Dear Landlord"
14. "A Sailors Life" (1st version without Swarb)
15. "Sir Patrick Spens"
16. "Quiet Joys of Brotherhood" (take 1)
17. "Quiet Joys of Brotherhood" (take 4)

=== Disc 14 (bonus disc) ===
==== Fotheringay ====
1. "The Sea" (studio demo)^{unreleased}
2. "Winter Winds" (studio demo)^{unreleased}
3. "The Pond and the Stream" (studio demo)^{unreleased}
4. "The Way I Feel" (original version)^{unreleased}
5. "Banks of the Nile" (alternate take)^{unreleased}
6. "Winter Winds" (alternate take)^{unreleased}
7. "Silver Threads and Golden Needles" (1st album outtake)
8. "The Sea" (live Holland Festival, Rotterdam 1970)^{unreleased}
9. "Two Weeks Last Summer" (live Holland Festival, Rotterdam 1970)
10. "Nothing More" (live Holland Festival, Rotterdam 1970)
11. "Banks of the Nile" (live Holland Festival, Rotterdam 1970)
12. "Memphis Tennessee" (live Holland Festival, Rotterdam 1970)
13. "Trouble" (live Holland Festival, Rotterdam 1970)^{unreleased}
14. "Bruton Town" (band rehearsal)^{unreleased}

=== Disc 15 (bonus disc) ===
==== Northstar Grassman and the Ravens & Sandy ====
1. "The Sea Captain" (demo)^{unreleased}
2. "Next Time Around" (demo)^{unreleased}
3. "The Optimist" (demo)^{unreleased}
4. "Wretched Wilbur" (demo)^{unreleased}
5. "Crazy Lady Blues" (demo)^{unreleased}
6. "Lord Bateman" (demo)^{unreleased}
7. "Walking the Floor Over You" (duet with Richard Thompson)^{unreleased}
8. "Losing Game"
9. Unreleased Northstar Grassman and the Ravens (Live, BBC One in Ten)^{unreleased}
10. Unreleased "Crazy Lady Blues" (Live, BBC One in Ten)^{unreleased}
11. Unreleased Late November (Live, BBC One in Ten)^{unreleased}
12. "If You Saw Thru My Eyes" (duet with Ian Matthews)
13. "It’s A Boy" (Tommy As Performed by The London Symphony Orchestra 1972)
14. "Northstar Grassman and the Ravens" (Live, BBC Bob Harris Show 06/09/71)^{unreleased}
15. "12th of Never"^{unreleased}
16. "Sweet Rosemary" (Manor demo alternate take)
17. "The Lady" (Manor demo)
18. "After Halloween" (Manor demo)

=== Disc 16 (bonus disc) ===
==== Sandy & Like An Old Fashioned Waltz ====
1. "It’ll Take a Long Time" (demo)^{unreleased}
2. "Sweet Rosemary" (Manor demo)
3. "For Nobody to Hear" (demo)^{unreleased}
4. "Tomorrow is a Long Time" (demo)^{unreleased}
5. "Quiet Joys of Brotherhood" (demo)^{unreleased}
6. "Listen, Listen" (Manor demo)^{unreleased}
7. "The Lady" (demo)^{unreleased}
8. "Bushes and Briars" (demo)^{unreleased}
9. "It Suits Me Well" (demo)^{unreleased}
10. "The Music Weaver" (demo)
11. "No End" (piano version alternate take with studio chat)^{unreleased}
12. "Whispering Grass" (studio demo)^{unreleased}
13. "Until the Real Thing Comes Along" (studio demo)^{unreleased}
14. "Walking the Floor Over You" (1973 version)
15. "No End" (solo piano version)

=== Disc 17 (bonus disc) ===
==== Fairport Live at the LA Troubadour 1974 & Interviews ====
Live tracks sequenced as a concert performance

1. "Down in the Flood" (live at the LA Troubadour)^{unreleased}
2. Solo (live at the LA Troubadour)^{unreleased}
3. "It’ll take a Long Time" (live at the LA Troubadour)^{unreleased}
4. "She moved through the Fair" (live at the LA Troubadour)^{unreleased}
5. "Knockin’ on Heavens Door" (live at the LA Troubadour)
6. "Like An Old Fashioned Waltz" (live at the LA Troubadour)
7. "John the Gun" (live at the LA Troubadour)^{unreleased}
8. "Crazy Lady Blues" (live at the LA Troubadour)^{unreleased}
9. "Who Knows Where the Time Goes" (live at the LA Troubadour)^{unreleased}
10. "Matty Groves" (live at the LA Troubadour)^{unreleased}
11. "That’ll be the Day" (live at the LA Troubadour)^{unreleased}
12. "What is True" (studio demo)^{unreleased}
13. Sandy interviewed about Like An Old Fashioned Waltz. BBC radio, John Peel Sounds on Sunday 06/01/1974^{unreleased}
14. Sandy interviewed in 1974 to promote Like An Old Fashioned Waltz and her return to Fairport Convention. BBC Manchester Piccadilly^{unreleased}

=== Disc 18 (bonus disc) ===
==== Rendezvous ====
1. "Blackwaterside" (live Marc Time 1975)^{unreleased}
2. "No More Sad Refrains" (live Marc Time 1975)^{unreleased}
3. "By The Time It Gets Dark" (acoustic studio demo)^{unreleased}
4. "One Way Donkey Ride" (acoustic version)^{unreleased}
5. "Losing Game" (with Jess Roden)
6. "Easy to Slip"
7. "By The Time It Gets Dark" (studio demo)
8. "No More Sad Refrains" (live at Basing Street Studios 25/04/76)^{unreleased}
9. "I’m a Dreamer" (live at Basing Street Studios 25/04/76)^{unreleased}
10. "All Our Days" (Choral version)^{unreleased}
11. "By The Time It Gets Dark" (studio take with full band)
12. "Still Waters Run Deep" (Acoustic version)^{unreleased}
13. "Full Moon" (acoustic version)^{unreleased}
14. "Candle in the Wind" (piano version)^{unreleased}
15. "Moments"
16. "I Wish I Was a Fool for You" (Original Gold Dust LP version)^{unreleased}
17. "Gold Dust" (Original Gold Dust LP version)^{unreleased}
18. "Still Waters Run Deep" (Original Gold Dust LP version)^{unreleased}
19. "Moments" (Acoustic version) actual final studio recording^{unreleased}

=== Disc 19 (bonus disc) ===
==== The Byfield demos 74-77 ====
1. "King And Queen of England" (demo with piano introduction)
2. "Rising For the Moon" (demo)
3. "One More Chance" (demo)
4. "King and Queen of England" (take 1, demo)^{unreleased}
5. "After Halloween" (demo 1974)^{unreleased}
6. "What Is True" (demo)
7. "Stranger to Himself" (demo)
8. "Take Away the Load" (demo)
9. "By the Time It Gets Dark" (demo)
10. "I’m a Dreamer" (demo)
11. "Full Moon" (demo)
12. "Take Me Away" (demo)
13. "All Our Days" (demo)
14. "No More Sad Refrains" (demo)
15. "Still Waters Run Deep" (demo)
16. "One Way Donkey Ride" (demo)
17. "I’m a Dreamer" (2nd demo)^{unreleased}
18. "Full Moon" (2nd demo)^{unreleased}
19. "Makes Me Think of You" (demo)^{unreleased}
