= A Boxful of Treasures =

Box set by Sandy Denny
- Released: 11 October 2004
- Recorded: 1967–1977
- Genre: folk rock
- Label: Fledg'ling NEST 5002
- Producer: various

Sandy Denny chronology
| Gold Dust (1985) | A Boxful of Treasures (2004) | Live at the BBC (2007) |

Professional ratings
Review scores
| Source | Rating |
|---|---|
| Allmusic | 4.5/5 stars |

A Boxful of Treasures is a 2004 compilation box set of recordings by folk singer Sandy Denny and comprises solo material and recordings made during her time as a member of Fotheringay, Fairport Convention, and other groups. The fifth CD contains previously unreleased tracks, most of which are demos recorded at Denny's home.

== Track listing ==
All songs are credited to Sandy Denny except where noted.

=== Disc one ===
| No. | Title | Writer(s) | Context | Length |
|---|---|---|---|---|
| 1. | "3:10 to Yuma" | George Duning, Ned Washington | from Sandy and Johnny | 3:37 |
| 2. | "She Moves Through the Fair" | Traditional | Solo, home recording | 4:04 |
| 3. | "Boxful of Treasure" | | | 1:43 |
| 4. | "They Don't Seem to Know You" | | | 2:25 |
| 5. | "Go Your Way My Love" | Anne Briggs | | 4:12 |
| 6. | "Geordie" | Traditional | | 3:45 |
| 7. | "Been on the Road So Long" | Alex Campbell | with Alex Campbell from Alex Campbell and his Friends | 5:03 |
| 8. | "You Never Wanted Me" | Jackson C. Frank | | 3:24 |
| 9. | "This Train" | Traditional | | 2:07 |
| 10. | "Sail Away to the Sea" | Dave Cousins | from All Our Own Work by Strawbs | 3:25 |
| 11. | "Tell Me What You See In Me" | Cousins | | 3:38 |
| 12. | "Who Knows Where the Time Goes?" | | | 4:14 |
| 13. | "Autopsy" | | Demo recording | 4:28 |
| 14. | "Now & Then" | | | 3:51 |
| 15. | "I Don't Know Where I Stand" | Joni Mitchell | Radio session with Fairport Convention from Heyday | 3:40 |
| 16. | "Bird on a Wire" | Leonard Cohen | | 3:30 |
| 17. | "Fotheringay" | | with Fairport Convention from What We Did on Our Holidays | 3:06 |
| 18. | "Nottamun Town" | Traditional | | 3:11 |
| 19. | "Meet on the Ledge" | Richard Thompson | | 2:53 |
| Total length: | | | | 66:16 |

=== Disc two ===
| No. | Title | Writer(s) | Context | Length |
|---|---|---|---|---|
| 1. | "Si Tu Dois Partir" | Bob Dylan | with Fairport Convention from Unhalfbricking | 2:22 |
| 2. | "Cajun Woman" | Richard Thompson | | 2:45 |
| 3. | "The Ballad of Easy Rider" | Dylan, Roger McGuinn | with Fairport Convention from the Liege & Lief sessions | 4:56 |
| 4. | "A Sailor's Life" | Traditional arranged by Denny, Thompson, Simon Nicol, Ashley Hutchings, Martin Lamble | with Fairport Convention from Unhalfbricking | 11:11 |
| 5. | "Reynardine" | Traditional arr. Fairport Convention | with Fairport Convention from Liege & Lief | 4:33 |
| 6. | "Farewell Farewell" | Thompson | | 2:40 |
| 7. | "Tam Lin" | Traditional arranged by Dave Swarbrick | | 7:13 |
| 8. | "Sir Patrick Spens" | Traditional arr. Fairport Convention | BBC radio session on September 23, 1969, from From Past Archives | 3:47 |
| 9. | "The Pond and the Stream" | | with Fotheringay from their album Fotheringay | 3:19 |
| 10. | "The Sea" | | | 5:32 |
| 11. | "The Banks of the Nile" | Traditional | | 8:06 |
| 12. | "Silver Threads and Golden Needles" | Dick Reynolds, Rhodes | with Fotheringay, previously unreleased | 4:32 |
| 13. | "The Lowlands of Holland" | Traditional | BBC radio session, August 24, 1971, from The BBC Sessions 1971–73 | 3:21 |
| 14. | "Nothing More" | | Live Rotterdam, June 28, 1970, from Who Knows Where the Time Goes? | 4:54 |
| 15. | "Gypsy Davey" | Traditional | with Fotheringay from their album Fotheringay | 3:54 |
| 16. | "Late November" | | from Who Knows Where the Time Goes? | 4:34 |

=== Disc three ===
| No. | Title | Writer(s) | Context | Length |
|---|---|---|---|---|
| 1. | "The North Star Grassman and the Ravens" | | from The North Star Grassman and the Ravens | 3:23 |
| 2. | "Next Time Around" | | | 4:46 |
| 3. | "Blackwaterside" | Traditional | | 4:12 |
| 4. | "The Sea Captain" | | | 3:10 |
| 5. | "Thro' My Eyes" | Iain Matthews | with Iain Matthews | 2:37 |
| 6. | "Learning the Game" | Buddy Holly | from Rock On by The Bunch | 2:09 |
| 7. | "Here in Silence" | Elford, Fraser | from the soundtrack of the film "Pass of Arms" | 3:53 |
| 8. | "Bruton Town" | Traditional | from Who Knows Where the Time Goes? | 4:50 |
| 9. | "Sweet Rosemary" | | | 2:58 |
| 10. | "After Halloween" | | | 2:58 |
| 11. | "The Lady" | | | 3:40 |
| 12. | "The Music Weaver" | | from Sandy | 3:21 |
| 13. | "Ecoute Ecoute" | | from The Attic Tracks Vol. 4 | 3:59 |
| 14. | "The Quiet Joys of Brotherhood" | Richard Fariña | from Sandy | 4:28 |
| 15. | "It'll Take a Long Time" | | | 5:15 |
| 16. | "No End" | | live solo version recorded December 3, 1972, from The Attic Tracks Vol. 1 | 7:36 |
| 17. | "Bushes and Briars" | | BBC radio session, October 25, 1972; from The BBC Sessions 1971-1973 | 2:38 |
| 18. | "Walking the Floor Over You" | Ernest Tubb | from Who Knows Where the Time Goes? | 4:21 |

=== Disc four ===
| No. | Title | Writer(s) | Context | Length |
|---|---|---|---|---|
| 1. | "Whispering Grass" | Doris Fisher, Fred Fisher | BBC radio session, November 14, 1973; from The BBC Sessions 1971–73 | 3:45 |
| 2. | "Solo" | | from Like an Old Fashioned Waltz | 4:24 |
| 3. | "At the End of the Day" | | | 6:31 |
| 4. | "Like an Old Fashioned Waltz" | | | 4:13 |
| 5. | "Until the Real Thing Comes Along" | Sammy Cahn, Saul Chaplin, L.E. Freeman | BBC radio session, on November 14, 1973; from The BBC Sessions 1971–73 | 4:10 |
| 6. | "John the Gun" | | Live at the L.A. Troubadour on February 1, 1974, with Fairport Convention | 5:39 |
| 7. | "She Moves Through the Fair" | Traditional | | 3:30 |
| 8. | "One More Chance" | | Home demo from The Attic Tracks Vol. 4 | 3:56 |
| 9. | "King and Queen of England" | | Home demo from Island Life: 25 Years of Island Records | 3:55 |
| 10. | "Rising For the Moon" | | With Fairport Convention, from Rising for the Moon | 4:09 |
| 11. | "White Dress" | Ralph McTell, Dave Swarbrick | | 4:45 |
| 12. | "I'm a Dreamer" | | from Rendezvous | 4:48 |
| 13. | "By the Time It Gets Dark" | | from the Rendezvous sessions | 4:12 |
| 14. | "No More Sad Refrains" | | from Rendezvous | 2:51 |
| 15. | "Losing Game" | Eric Clapton | from the Rendezvous sessions | 3:17 |
| 16. | "Easy to Slip" | Lowell George, Fred Martin | from The Attic Tracks Vol. 1 | 3:28 |
| 17. | "Full Moon" | | From Who Knows Where the Time Goes? | 4:31 |
| 18. | "Moments" | Bryn Haworth | from The Attic Tracks Vol. 1 | 4:31 |

=== Disc five ===
| No. | Title | Writer(s) | Context | Length |
|---|---|---|---|---|
| 1. | "One Way Donkey Ride" | | Demo | 4:14 |
| 2. | "I'm a Dreamer" | | | 4:17 |
| 3. | "Take Me Away" | | | 4:00 |
| 4. | "Rising for the Moon" | | | 3:08 |
| 5. | "Still Waters Run Deep" | | | 3:10 |
| 6. | "All Our Days" | | | 3:40 |
| 7. | "No More Sad Refrains" | | | 3:07 |
| 8. | "By the Time It Gets Dark" | | | 3:32 |
| 9. | "The Music Weaver" | | | 3:17 |
| 10. | "What Is True?" | | | 3:46 |
| 11. | "Stranger to Himself" | | | 2:20 |
| 12. | "Take Away the Load" | | | 1:43 |
| 13. | "By the Time It Gets Dark" | | Alternate take | 3:41 |
| 14. | "Full moon" | | | 5:01 |
| 15. | "Knockin' on Heaven's Door" | Bob Dylan | Live | 5:25 |
| 16. | "It'll Take a Long Time" | | | 5:43 |
| 17. | "Who Knows Where the Time Goes?" | | | 6:35 |
