= The BBC Sessions 1971–1973 =

Live album by Sandy Denny
- Released: May 1997 (UK)
- Recorded: 1971–1973
- Venue: Paris Theatre and BBC, London
- Genre: Folk rock
- Length: 75:24
- Label: Strange Fruit SFRSCD006 (UK)
- Producer: Jeff Griffin

Sandy Denny chronology
Sandy Denny and the Strawbs (1991)	The BBC Sessions 1971–1973 (1997)	Gold Dust (1998)

Professional ratings
Review scores
Source	Rating
Allmusic	4.5/5 stars

The BBC Sessions 1971–1973 is a live album by English folk rock singer Sandy Denny released in 1997. It contains a selection of live concert tracks recorded at the Paris Theatre, London on 16 March 1972, as well as live studio tracks recorded for the BBC.

The CD was withdrawn on the day of release due to a legal dispute with Island Records but 3,500 copies were already in the shops and were allowed to remain in circulation. For many years this was a highly desirable collectable amongst fans until 2007 when the expanded Live at the BBC box set superseded this album.

== Track listing ==
All tracks credited to Sandy Denny unless otherwise stated

1. "The North Star Grassman and the Ravens" – 3:47
2. "Sweet Rosemary" – 3:15
3. "The Lady" – 3:45
4. "Next Time Around" – 4:46
5. "Blackwaterside" (Traditional) – 3:26
6. "John the Gun" – 3:13
7. "Late November" – 5:08
8. "The Optimist" – 3:27
9. "Crazy Lady Blues" – 2:17
10. "The Lowlands of Holland" (Traditional) – 3:09
11. "It Suits Me Well" – 4:13
12. "Bushes and Briars" – 2:35
13. "The Music Weaver" – 3:08
14. "It’ll Take a Long Time" – 4:02
15. "Who Knows Where the Time Goes?" – 5:35
16. "Until the Real Thing Comes Along" (L.E. Freeman, Sammy Cahn, Saul Chaplin) – 4:05
17. "Whispering Grass" (Doris Fisher, Fred Fisher) – 3:27
18. "Like an Old Fashioned Waltz" – 3:31
19. "Dark the Night" – 4:07
20. "Solo" – 4:28

== Personnel ==
- Sandy Denny - vocals, piano, guitar

Tracks 16–17 and 19–20 with the addition of

- Hughie Burns - guitar
- Pat Donaldson - bass
- Willie Murray - drums

=== Production credits ===
- Tracks 1–6 and 11–14 produced by Jeff Griffin
- Tracks 7–10 engineered by John White and Nick Gomin, produced by John Muir
- Tracks 15–20 produced by Tony Wilson
