= Gold Dust (Sandy Denny album) =

Live album by Sandy Denny
- Released: June 1998 (UK)
- Recorded: 27 November 1977
- Venues: Royalty Theatre, Portugal Street, London
- Genre: Folk rock
- Label: Island IMCD 252/524 (UK)
- Producers: Jerry Boys, Jerry Donahue, Trevor Wyatt

Sandy Denny chronology
The BBC Sessions 1971-1973 (1997)	Gold Dust (1998)	No More Sad Refrains: The Anthology (2000)

Professional ratings
Review scores
Source	Rating
Allmusic	3/5 stars

Gold Dust is a live album by the late English folk rock singer Sandy Denny. It documents one of Denny's last public performances and was recorded at London's "Sound Circus" venue at the Royalty Theatre, Portugal Street, near Aldwych, London (now the Peacock Theatre) on 27 November 1977. The album features many of her classic songs both as a solo artist and as a member of Fairport Convention and Fotheringay and remains the most extensive documentation of Sandy's live work with a backing band. The album was not released on the label originally planned owing to stated technical problems with the master tape, and was only released on a different label twenty years after her death after various guitar and backing vocal tracks parts were re-recorded by Jerry Donahue and others.

== Album Information ==
Denny had not performed live for about two years and her solo studio release from earlier that year, Rendezvous, had shown a departure from traditional folk music. She had been quoted as saying shortly before this recording "If I have to sing 'Matty Groves' one more time, I'll throw myself out of a window." Denny's voice is well captured on this recording, although some critics claim that it was sub-par due either to the effects of a cold or to wear-and-tear compounded by the effects of her long-term smoking. The performance was the final concert of an 11-date U.K. tour, although one source claims erroneously that it was the first date (both the first and last dates were played at the same venue). The included songs comprise a wide-ranging selection from her recording career and include one from her pre-Fairport days and recorded with both the Strawbs and with Fairport on Unhalfbricking (Who Knows Where the Time Goes?), two from Fotheringay (Nothing More and The Sea), three from The North Star Grassman and the Ravens (John the Gun, Wretched Wilbur and that album's title track, although John the Gun was also originally performed and recorded with Fotheringay), three from Sandy (The Lady, It'll Take a Long Time and Tomorrow is a Long Time), one from Like an Old Fashioned Waltz (Solo), two from Rising for the Moon (produced during her second stint with Fairport ―Stranger to Himself and One More Chance) and five from Rendezvous (I Wish I Was a Fool For You (For Shame of Doing Wrong), I'm a Dreamer, Take Me Away, Gold Dust and No More Sad Refrains). Containing as it did three-fifths of the original Fotheringay group (Sandy, Trevor Lucas and Pat Donaldson) with the addition of Dave Mattacks on drums, Rob Hendry on lead guitar and Pete Willsher on pedal steel guitar, the band has a distinctly Fotheringay feel, an impression further enhanced by the later replacement of many guitar parts by fourth ex-Fotheringay member Jerry Donahue (see below), who was unavailable for the original concerts being on tour himself with Joan Armatrading at the time. (Note: In Clinton Heylin's "Biography of Sandy", Phil Palmer is also listed as an additional lead guitarist for the tour, and is also listed in a separate "upcoming news" item; however, there is no independent evidence that he actually played on the tour.)

While originally intended for a live album to be released by Saga Records owner Marcel Rodd, the purchase of the tapes was declined owing to technical problems on the guitar and backing vocal tracks. Eventually the tapes were purchased by Island Records, although only one track was issued, being a performance of "The Lady" backed just by solo piano, included as the lead track on the Joe Boyd/Trevor Lucas-produced 1985 4-disc posthumous compilation Who Knows Where The Time Goes?.

In 1997 it was decided that for commercial release of the remainder of the concert, the problematic lead guitar and backing vocals tracks needed re-recording and this was undertaken by Jerry Donahue with replacement backing vocals by Simon Nicol and Chris Leslie (who were not part of the original band line-up); in addition the running order on the CD was also changed from the original. (Note: Clinton Heylin gives the following as the original running order for the set: 1: Solo; 2: The North Star Grassman and the Ravens; 3: Nothing More; 4: Gold Dust; 5: The Sea; 6: No More Sad Refrains; 7: Tomorrow Is a Long Time; 8: The Lady; 9: Wretched Wilbur; 10: For Shame of Doing Wrong; 11: Stranger To Himself; 12: Take Me Away; 13: One More Chance; 14: Who Knows Where The Time Goes. He does not list "I'm a Dreamer" (performed either before or after "Gold Dust" elsewhere on the tour), "John The Gun" (performed before "The Sea" elsewhere) or "It'll Take A Long Time" (performed before "Tomorrow Is a Long Time" elsewhere).) Some fans consider these changes regrettable; however, for the CD's producers, they were considered the best way to produce a product suitable for commercial release. The completed (remixed) album was released by Island in 1998, twenty years after Denny's death and nine after that of Trevor Lucas. A subset of rough mixes of the original, unadulterated concert performances had previously been released on a fans-only cassette compilation, "The Attic Tracks Volume 3", based on tapes found in Lucas's collection, with a smaller subset on a subsequent CD compilation "The Attic Tracks 1972-1984". Owing to restrictions of time for the finished CD, most song introductions and between-song talk are omitted; however, a composite audience tape from an earlier date on the same tour (at Croydon, on 11 November) preserves much of the latter and also the contributions of the original lineup. (A tape of the Birmingham show on 16 November also exists, although the audio quality is somewhat poorer.)

In an interview with Sandy recorded in late 1977, posted by Karl Dallas, she can be heard discussing the upcoming tour and her choice of musicians and material, among other subjects.

== Track listing ==
All tracks credited to Sandy Denny unless otherwise stated

1. "I Wish I was a Fool For You (For Shame of Doing Wrong)" (Richard Thompson) - 4:32
2. "Stranger to Himself" - 3:45
3. "I'm a Dreamer" - 4:53
4. "Take Me Away" - 4:42
5. "Nothing More" - 4:15
6. "The Sea" - 5:10
7. "The Lady" - 3:45
8. "Gold Dust" - 3:53
9. "Solo" - 4:46
10. "John the Gun" - 4:47
11. "It'll Take a Long Time" - 4:59
12. "Wretched Wilbur" - 2:59
13. "Tomorrow Is a Long Time" (Bob Dylan) - 3:57
14. "The North Star Grassman" - 3:46
15. "One More Chance" - 8:21
16. "No More Sad Refrains" - 2:27
17. "Who Knows Where the Time Goes?" - 6:38

== Personnel ==
- Sandy Denny - vocals, piano, acoustic guitar
- Pat Donaldson - bass guitar, backing vocals
- Dave Mattacks - drums
- Pete Willsher - pedal steel guitar (misspelled Wilsher on sleeve)
- Trevor Lucas - acoustic guitar, backing vocals
- Rob Hendry - electric & acoustic guitar at original concert, largely replaced by Jerry Donahue for the CD release
- Simon Nicol and Chris Leslie - backing vocals added for the CD release (did not perform at original concert)

=== Production credits ===
- Recorded by John Wood at the Royalty Theatre 22/11/77
- Mixes produced by Jerry Boys & Jerry Donahue
- Engineered by Jerry Boys at Livingstone Studios
- Executive Producer (Restoration) - Trevor Wyatt
- Mastered by Donal Wheelan at Chop 'Em Out, London
