= Who Knows Where the Time Goes? (disambiguation) =

"Who Knows Where the Time Goes?" is a song written by English folk singer Sandy Denny in 1967.

Who Knows Where the Time Goes? may also refer to:

- Who Knows Where the Time Goes (Judy Collins album), 1968
- Who Knows Where the Time Goes? (Sandy Denny album), 1985
- Who Knows Where the Time Goes? (Fairport Convention album), 1997
- Who Knows Where the Time Goes, a 2011 album by Rondi Charleston

== See also ==
- "Where'd All the Time Go?", a song by Dr. Dog from the 2010 album Shame, Shame
