= Who Knows Where the Time Goes? (Sandy Denny album) =

1985 compilation album by Sandy Denny

Compilation album by Sandy Denny
- Released: 1985
- Recorded: 1967 – 1977
- Genre: folk rock
- Length: 182:55
- Label: UK: Island
- Producer: Trevor Lucas & Joe Boyd

Sandy Denny chronology
Rendezvous (1977)	Who Knows Where the Time Goes? (1985)	Sandy Denny and the Strawbs (1991)

Professional ratings
Review scores
Source	Rating
AllMusic	4.5/5 stars
The Encyclopedia of Popular Music	4/5 stars
Q	4/5 stars
Rolling Stone	3.5/5 stars

Who Knows Where the Time Goes? is a retrospective compilation of the work of English folk rock singer Sandy Denny issued in 1985. It is a four-LP boxed set released on the Island Records label in the UK and Germany and on Hannibal/Carthage Records in the US, later reissued as a three-CD set. It includes released and previously unreleased recordings from 1967 to 1977, live performances, outtakes and demos from Denny's solo career, and with Fairport Convention, Fotheringay and Strawbs.

The set included a twenty-page booklet featuring many photographs of Denny, her family, and friends, as well as lyrics of most of the songs, and instrumental credits.

== Reception ==
AllMusic praised the album, describing it as "[a] magnificently produced ... complete portrait of Sandy Denny", Denny herself as "the haunting singer, the melodic, mournful songwriter", and summed up the collection as "[t]he album makes the case for Denny as a major folk artist."

Rolling Stone magazine's David Fricke described the set as "worthy of her largely unrecognized talent... (and) has captured her finest hours for all time"

== Track listing ==
All songs are credited to Sandy Denny except where noted.

=== Side one ===
1. "The Lady" – 5:08 – recorded live in London(during what would end up being Sandy's last concert), 1977
2. "Listen, Listen" – 3:57 – from Sandy
3. "Next Time Around" – 4:23 – from The North Star Grassman and the Ravens
4. "Farewell, Farewell" (Richard Thompson) – 2:38 – from Liege and Lief (Fairport Convention)
5. "The Music Weaver" - 3:04 - demo recorded 1972
6. "Tomorrow is a Long Time" (Bob Dylan) – 3:56 – from Sandy

=== Side two ===
1. "The Quiet Joys of Brotherhood" (words: Richard Fariña) – 5:58 – unreleased track by Fairport Convention
2. "The Pond and the Stream" – 3:16 – from Fotheringay
3. "One Way Donkey Ride" – 3:34 – from Rendezvous
4. "Take Away the Load (Sandy's Song)" – 1:36 – demo recorded 1976
5. "One More Chance" – 7:52 – from Rising for the Moon (Fairport Convention)

=== Side three ===
1. "Bruton Town" – 4:47 – BBC recording 1972
2. "Blackwaterside" – 4:15 – from The North Star Grassman and the Ravens
3. "Tam Lin" – 7:10 – from Liege and Lief (Fairport Convention)
4. "The Banks of the Nile" – 8:06 – from Fotheringay

=== Side four ===
1. "Sail Away to the Sea" (Dave Cousins) – 3:25 – from All Our Own Work (Sandy and The Strawbs)
2. "You Never Wanted Me" (Jackson C. Frank) – 3:08 – BBC recording 1968 (Fairport Convention)
3. "Sweet Rosemary" – 2:40 – demo recorded 1972
4. "Now And Then" - 3:45 - demo recorded 1968
5. "Autopsy" – 4:19 – from Unhalfbricking (Fairport Convention)
6. "It'll Take a Long Time" – 5:14 – from Sandy

=== Side five ===
1. "Two Weeks Last Summer" (Dave Cousins) – 3:50 – unreleased track by Fotheringay
2. "Late November" – 4:31 – from the Island sampler El Pea (Fotheringay)
3. "Gypsy Davey" (Traditional) – 3:53 – unreleased track by Fotheringay, 1970
4. "Winter Winds" – 2:10 – from Fotheringay
5. "Nothing More" – 4:56 – recorded live in Rotterdam, 1970 (Fotheringay)
6. "Memphis, Tennessee" (Chuck Berry) – 4:00 – recorded live in Rotterdam, 1970 (Fotheringay)

=== Side six ===
1. "Walking the Floor Over You" – 4:17 – unreleased track 1971/73
2. "When Will I Be Loved?" (Don and Phil Everly) – 3:10 – from The Bunch (duet w/ Linda Thompson)
3. "Whispering Grass" (Doris Fisher and Fred Fisher) – 3:56 – from Like an Old Fashioned Waltz
4. "Friends" - 3:31 - from Like an Old Fashioned Waltz
5. "Solo" – 5:01 – recorded live in Los Angeles, 1974 (Fairport Convention)
6. "After Halloween" – 2:57 – unreleased track, 1972

=== Side seven ===
1. "For Shame of Doing Wrong" (Richard Thompson) – 3:42 – from Rendezvous
2. "Stranger to Himself" – 2:50 – from Rising for the Moon (Fairport Convention)
3. "I'm a Dreamer" – 4:43 – from Rendezvous
4. "John the Gun" – 5:11 – from Fairport Live Convention (A Moveable Feast)
5. "Knockin' on Heaven's Door" (Bob Dylan) – 4:30 – recorded live in Los Angeles, 1974 (Fairport Convention)

=== Side eight ===
1. "By the Time it Gets Dark" – 3:20 – demo recorded 1974
2. "What is True?" – 3:44 – demo recorded 1973
3. "The Sea" – 5:25 – from Fotheringay
4. "Full Moon" – 4:30 – unreleased track, 1976
5. "Who Knows Where the Time Goes?" – 6:37 – recorded live Los Angeles, 1974 (Fairport Convention)

=== CD release ===
The tracks on the 1991 CD release were in the same order as on the original vinyl discs:

- Disc one : Sides one & two and tracks one and two of Side three,
- Disc two : tracks three and four of Side three, Sides four and five, and track one of Side six
- Disc three : the rest

=== 4CDs release ===
- Disc one : Same as CD release
- Disc two : Same as CD release
- Disc three : Same as CD release
- Disc four
1. "It'll Take A Long Time" - 05:43 – live 1 February 1974 at Los Angeles (Fairport Convention)
2. "John The Gun" - 05:39 – live 1 February 1974 at Los Angeles (Fairport Convention)
3. "She Moves Through The Fair (Trad. / Words by Padraic Colum)" - 03:27 – live 1 February 1974 at Los Angeles (Fairport Convention)
4. "Autopsy" - 04:25 – demo recorded 30 December 1968
5. "Take Me Away" - 03:57 – home demo recorded 1977
6. "One Way Donkey Ride" - 04:11 – home demo recorded 1977
7. "Still Waters Run Deep" - 03:57 – home demo recorded 1977
8. "By The Time It Gets Dark" - 03:30 – alternate demo recorded 1977
9. "By The Time It Gets Dark" - 03:38 – run through recorded 1977
10. "By The Time It Gets Dark" - 04:06 – alternate take recorded 1977
11. "All Our Days" - 03:37 – home demo recorded 1977
12. "Full Moon" - 04:28 – home demo recorded 1977
13. "Losing Game (James Carr & Denny Weaver)" - 03:14 – alternate take recorded 4 April and 18 June 1977 (duet /w Jess Roden)
14. "Silver Threads And Golden Needles (Dick Reynolds & Jack Rhodes)" - 04:29 – unreleased take by Fotheringay
15. "Moments (Bryn Haworth)" - 03:43 – the last recording of Sandy Denny recorded 20 May 1977
16. "No More Sad Refrains" - 03:05 – home demo recorded 1977

== Issue history ==
1985: (UK) 4 LPs - Island SDSP 100
1986: (US) 4 LPs - Hannibal 100/CD - Hannibal HAN5301
1991: LP/CD - Hannibal 5301
1991: CS - Hannibal HNBC-5301
2009: 4CDs – Universal Japan UICY94090
