= Live at the BBC (Fairport Convention album) =

Compilation album by Fairport Convention
- Released: 2007
- Recorded: 1968–1974
- Genre: British folk rock
- Label: Island

Live at the BBC is a 2007 compilation album by British folk rock band Fairport Convention. It consists of tracks recorded for the BBC for various radio programmes between 1968 and 1974 and comprises four CDs in a fold-out package with a fifty-page booklet including song lyrics and numerous contemporary photographs.

== Track listing ==
Disc one

1. "Close the Door Lightly When You Go" (Eric Andersen) – 2:57
2. "I Don't Know Where I Stand" (Joni Mitchell) – 3:36
3. "Some Sweet Day" (Felice & Boudleaux Bryant) – 2:16
4. "You Never Wanted Me" (Jackson C. Frank) – 3:15
5. "Nottamun Town" (trad. arr. Fairport Convention) – 3:35
6. "Marcie" (Joni Mitchell) – 3:34
7. "Night in the City" (Joni Mitchell) – 3:05
8. "Jack O'Diamonds" (Bob Dylan, Ben Carruthers) – 3:12
9. "Gone, Gone, Gone" (Phil & Don Everly) – 1:59
10. "Suzanne" (Leonard Cohen) – 5:25
11. "If It Feels Good, You Know It Can't Be Wrong" (Richard Thompson & Ashley Hutchings) – 3:12
12. "Eastern Rain" (Joni Mitchell) – 3:10
13. "Fotheringay" (Sandy Denny) – 3:09
14. "I Still Miss Someone" (Johnny Cash & Roy Cash) – 2:23
15. "Bird on a Wire" (Leonard Cohen) – 3:27
16. "Tried So Hard" (Gene Clark) – 2:54
17. "Reno, Nevada" (Richard Fariña) – 2:23
18. "Book Song" (Ian Matthews & Richard Thompson) – 3:05
19. "Who Knows Where the Time Goes?" (Sandy Denny) – 4:14

Disc two

1. "You're Gonna Need My Help" (Muddy Waters) – 3:56
2. "Fotheringay" (Sandy Denny) – 2:59
3. "Shattering Live Experience" (Simon Nicol) – 3:23
4. "Cajun Woman" (Richard Thompson) – 2:44
5. "Autopsy" (Sandy Denny) – 4:24
6. "Si Tu Dois Partir" (Bob Dylan) – 2:25
7. "Percy's Song" (Bob Dylan) – 5:25
8. "Reynardine" (trad. arr. Fairport Convention) – 4:19
9. "Tam Lin" (trad. arr. Dave Swarbrick) – 7:46
10. "Sir Patrick Spens" (trad. arr. Fairport Convention) – 3:44
11. "Medley: The Lark in the Morning/Rakish Paddy/Foxhunter's Jig/Toss the Feathers" (trad. arr. Fairport Convention) – 4:12
12. "The Lady Is a Tramp" (Rodgers and Hart) – 2:11
13. "Walk Awhile" (Dave Swarbrick, Richard Thompson) – 4:00
14. "Poor Will and the Jolly Hangman" (Richard Thompson, Dave Swarbrick) – 5:33
15. "Doctor of Physick" (Dave Swarbrick, Richard Thompson) – 3:37

Disc three

1. "Sir Patrick Spens" (trad. arr. Fairport Convention) – 3:32
2. "The Bonny Bunch of Roses" (trad. arr. Dave Swarbrick, Dave Mattacks, Simon Nicol, Richard Thompson) – 10:53
3. "Dirty Linen" (trad. arr. Dave Swarbrick) – 4:15
4. "Now Be Thankful" (Richard Thompson, Dave Swarbrick) – 2:24
5. "The Journeyman's Grace" (Dave Swarbrick, Richard Thompson) – 3:56
6. "Now Be Thankful" (Richard Thompson, Dave Swarbrick) – 3:23
7. "Tokyo" (Jerry Donahue) – 2:37
8. "Matthew, Mark, Luke and John" (Dave Mattacks, Simon Nicol, Dave Pegg, Dave Swarbrick, Richard Thompson) – 5:29
9. "Possibly Parsons Green" (Trevor Lucas, Pete Roche) – 4:27
10. "Rosie" (Dave Swarbrick) – 4:02
11. "John the Gun" (Sandy Denny) – 5:03
12. "Fiddlestix" (trad. arr. Dave Swarbrick, Dave Mattacks, Dave Pegg, Jerry Donahue, Trevor Lucas) – 2:47
13. "Rising for the Moon" (Sandy Denny) – 4:16
14. "Down in the Flood" (Bob Dylan) – 3:27

Disc four

1. "Let's Get Together" (Chet Powers) – 2:48
2. "One Sure Thing" (Harvey Brooks, Jim Glover) – 3:35
3. "Lay Down Your Weary Tune" (Bob Dylan) – 3:37
4. "Chelsea Morning" (Joni Mitchell) – 3:01
5. "Violets of Dawn" (Eric Andersen) – 3:53
6. "If (Stomp)" (Ian MacDonald, Richard Thompson) – 2:35
7. "Time Will Show the Wiser" (Emitt Rhodes) – 2:59
8. "If I Had a Ribbon Bow" (Hughie Prince, Louis Singer) – 2:34
9. "Meet on the Ledge" (Richard Thompson) – 2:48
10. "Light My Fire" (Jim Morrison, John Densmore, Robert Krieger, Ray Manzarek) – 1:20
11. "Flatback Caper" (trad. arr. Dave Swarbrick, Simon Nicol, Dave Pegg, Dave Mattacks, Richard Thompson) – 6:23
12. "Open the Door, Richard" (Bob Dylan) – 3:04
13. "The Deserter" (trad. arr. Fairport Convention) – 3:54
14. "The Hangman's Reel" (trad. arr. Dave Swarbrick) – 3:23
15. "Tam Lin" (trad. arr. Dave Swarbrick) – 8:03
16. "Sir William Gower" (trad. arr. Fairport Convention) – 4:47
17. "Banks of the Sweet Primroses" (trad. arr. Fairport Convention) – 4:09
18. "Sickness and Diseases" (Dave Swarbrick, Richard Thompson) – 3:41
19. "Bridge over the River Ash" (trad. arr. Dave Swarbrick, Dave Mattacks, Dave Pegg, Simon Nicol) – 2:09
20. "Lord Marlborough" (trad. arr. Fairport Convention) – 3:21
21. "Angel Delight" (Dave Mattacks, Simon Nicol, Dave Pegg, Dave Swarbrick) – 4:04

== Personnel ==
- Ashley Hutchings, bass [CD 1; CD 2 1–12; CD 4 1–10];
- Martin Lamble, drums [CD 1; CD 2 1–7; CD 4 1–10];
- Simon Nicol, guitar, vocals, backing vocals [CD 1; CD 2; CD 3 1–6; CD 4];
- Richard Thompson, guitar, vocals [CD 1; CD 2; CD 3 1–6; CD 4];
- Sandy Denny, vocals [CD 1; CD 2 1–10; CD 3 11–14];
- Ian Matthews, vocals [CD 1; CD 2 1–3; CD 4 5–10];
- Ric Grech, violin [CD 2 4–7];
- Dave Mattacks, drums [CD 2 8–15; CD 3; CD 4 11–21];
- Dave Swarbrick, violin, vocals [CD 2 8–15; CD 3; CD 4 11–21];
- Dave Pegg, bass, fiddle, mandolin, backing vocals [CD 2 13–15; CD 3; CD 4 11–21];
- Trevor Lucas, guitar, vocals [CD 3 7–14];
- Jerry Donahue, guitar, vocals [CD 3 7–14];
- Judy Dyble, vocals [CD 4 1–8]
