= Live at the BBC (Sandy Denny album) =

Box set by Sandy Denny
- Released: September 2007
- Recorded: Between 1966–1973 for the BBC
- Genre: Folk rock
- Label: Island (UK) 984 992-8
- Producer: various

Sandy Denny chronology
Where the Time Goes (2005)	Live at the BBC (2007)	The Music Weaver: Sandy Denny Remembered (2008)

Live at the BBC is a four disc compilation of British folk singer songwriter Sandy Denny's BBC sessions from 1966 to 1973 and contains almost all her solo work for the corporation. Disc 4 of the set is a DVD of Denny performing three songs on the music programme One in ten in 1971: the only surviving solo footage of her. This compilation superseded the earlier one-disc set issued on the Strange Fruit label in 1997 that due to rights issues was withdrawn on the day of release thereby creating a highly collectable disc up until the release of this comprehensive set.

The set contains early solo sessions during her time with Alex Campbell and Johnny Silvo, as well as her solo sessions post Fairport Convention and post Fotheringay comprising performances for Bob Harris, John Peel, Sounds on Sunday and The Old Grey Whistle Test promoting her solo albums The North Star Grassman and the Ravens, Sandy and Like an Old Fashioned Waltz. A seven-song concert broadcast from London's Paris Theatre is also included which captured her at the peak of her powers. The collection is supplemented by a rare and insightful interview with Denny for the BBC's World Service programme Tomorrow's People with Clive Jordan.

The set was issued in a 5.5 x 7.5 inch package that was designed by Phil Smee using lyrics and illustrations from Denny's notebooks and photos from her personal collection, many of which had not previously been published.

== Critical reception ==
It has long been asserted amongst fans of Denny's work that her solo acoustic performances showed her work in its best light with the immediacy of her voice and acoustic accompaniment showing the real quality of her vocal style and compositions. When the Live at the BBC boxset came out in September 2007 it was rapturously praised wherever it was reviewed including the Sunday Express who also ran a two-page spread on Denny's career. The set gained 5 star reviews in Uncut, Record Collector and Mojo, whose critic Jim Irvin asserted in his review that "(The set) provides more evidence that she's among the finest singer-songwriters who ever sang and wrote". This favourable critical response did much to continue the resurgence of interest in Sandy Denny's work.

A one-disc highlights edition of the boxset was issued in April 2008 called Sandy Denny: The Best of the BBC Recordings.

== Personnel ==
- Sandy Denny - vocals, piano, guitar
- Johnny Silvo - guitar [CD 1 track 3–4]
- Roger Evans - guitar [CD 1 track 3–4, CD 4 tracks 1–4]
- Dave Moses - double bass [CD 1 track 3–4, CD 4 tracks 1–4]
- Hughie Burns - guitar [CD 1 track 16–19]
- Pat Donaldson - bass [CD 1 track 16–19]
- Willie Murray - drums [CD 1 track 16–19]
