= A Sailor's Life =

Song performed by Judy Collins

Song
- Published: 1700s
- Songwriter: Traditional

"A Sailor’s Life" (Roud 273; Laws K12) is an English language folk song which describes the attempt of a young woman to find her lover, a sailor. Eventually she hears that he has drowned and mourns him.

== History ==
The song was printed in eighteenth-century broadsides and collected by W. Percy Merrick in 1899 from Henry Hills of Lodsworth, Sussex. Countless recordings have been made of the song, including one version sung in 1908 by A. Lane of Winchcombe, Gloucestershire, England, recorded on phonograph by Percy Grainger; this recording can be heard on the British Library Sound Archive website.

It was published in the Penguin Book of English Folk Songs and recorded in 1960 by A. L. Lloyd for the album A Selection from the Penguin Book of English Folk Songs. It was subsequently recorded by Judy Collins on her album A Maid of Constant Sorrow in 1961 and Martin Carthy for his Second Album in 1966 with his then playing partner violinist Dave Swarbrick.

It is probably from one of these sources that the song was learnt by Sandy Denny who sang it in her solo career and then brought it to the band Fairport Convention, where with Swarbrick guesting on violin and Richard Thompson on guitar, it was released on the band's 1969 Unhalfbricking album. The eleven-minute version, regarded as a pivotal step in the development of British folk rock, was recorded in one take. It was a recording which marked the beginning of the genre, leading to the seminal album Liege & Lief later that year. British music website Uncut describes the track as: "11 minutes of seething cymbal washes on a Celtic drone chord sequence, erupting into a middle section where squalling crosswinds are traded between Richard Thompson and guest fiddler Dave Swarbrick."

== Variants ==
The following can be seen as variants of the song:

- "Sailor Boy" (America)
- "Black Is the Color (of My True Love's Hair)" (America)
- "The Lost Sailor" (Australia)
- "The Pinery Boy"
- "Willie the Bold Sailor Boy"
- "Sailor on the Deep Blue Sea" (America)
- "Sweet William"
- "Willie Boy" (America)

== Discography ==
- A. L. Lloyd, A Selection from the Penguin Book of English Folk Songs (Collector, 1960)
- Judy Collins, A Maid of Constant Sorrow (Electra, 1961).
- Martin Carthy, Second Album (with Dave Swarbrick) (Fontana, 1966)
- Fairport Convention, Unhalfbricking (Island, 1969)
- Ashley Hutchings, The Guv'nor vol 1, (HTD, 1994)
- Solas (group),The Turning Tide (Compass Records, 2010)
