= Sandy Denny =

British singer (1947–1978)

- Denny in 1972

Background information
- Born: Alexandra Elene MacLean Denny; 6 January 1947; Merton Park, Surrey, England
- Died: 21 April 1978 (aged 31) Wimbledon, London, England
- Genres: Folk rock; folk
- Occupations: Musician; singer; songwriter
- Instruments: Vocals; guitar; piano
- Works: Sandy Denny discography
- Years active: 1965–1978
- Label: Island Records
- Formerly of: Fairport Convention; Strawbs; Fotheringay; The Bunch
- Website: sandydennyofficial.com

Alexandra Elene MacLean Denny (6 January 1947 – 21 April 1978) was an English musician who is best known for her work with the folk rock band Fairport Convention during the late 1960s. She has been described as "arguably the pre-eminent British folk-rock singer/songwriter of her time".

After briefly working with the Strawbs, Denny joined Fairport Convention in 1968, remaining with them until 1969. She formed the short-lived band Fotheringay in 1970, before focusing on a solo career. Between 1971 and 1977, Denny released four solo albums: The North Star Grassman and the Ravens, Sandy, Like an Old Fashioned Waltz and Rendezvous. She also duetted with Robert Plant on "The Battle of Evermore" for Led Zeppelin's album Led Zeppelin IV in 1971. Denny died in 1978 at the age of 31 from head injuries sustained as a result of a fall down a flight of stairs.

Music publications Uncut and Mojo have described Denny as Britain's finest female singer-songwriter. Her composition "Who Knows Where the Time Goes?" has been recorded by Judy Collins, Eva Cassidy, Nina Simone, Mary Black, Kate Wolf, Nanci Griffith, 10,000 Maniacs, Luke Sital-Singh and Cat Power. Her recorded work has been the subject of numerous reissues, along with a wealth of previously unreleased material which has appeared over the more than 40 years since her death, including a 19-CD box set released in November 2010.

In January 2023, Denny was ranked at number 164 on Rolling Stone magazine's list of the 200 Greatest Singers of All Time.

== Childhood ==
Denny was born on 6 January 1947 at Nelson Hospital, Kingston Road, Merton Park, London, to Neil and Edna Denny. She studied classical piano as a child.

Denny's paternal grandfather was from Dundee, and her paternal grandmother was a Scots Gaelic speaker and singer of traditional Gaelic songs. At an early age Denny showed an interest in singing, although her strict parents were reluctant to believe there was a living to be made from it. She attended Coombe Girls' School in New Malden; after leaving school she began training as a nurse at the Royal Brompton Hospital.

== Early career ==
Denny's nursing career proved short-lived. In the meantime she had secured a place on a foundation course at Kingston College of Art, which she took up in September 1965, becoming involved with the folk club on campus. Her contemporaries at the college included guitarist and future member of Pentangle, John Renbourn.

After her first public appearance at the Barge in Kingston upon Thames, Denny began working the folk club circuit in the evenings with an American-influenced repertoire, including songs by Tom Paxton, together with traditional folk songs. Denny made the first of many appearances for the BBC at Cecil Sharp House on 2 December 1966 on the Folk Song Cellar programme where she accompanied herself on two traditional songs: "Fear a' Bhàta" and "Green Grow the Laurels".

Denny's earliest professional recordings were made a few months later in mid-1967 for the Saga label, featuring traditional songs and covers of folk contemporaries including her boyfriend of this period, the American singer-songwriter Jackson C. Frank. They were released on the albums Alex Campbell and His Friends and Sandy and Johnny with Johnny Silvo. These songs were collected on the 1970 album It's Sandy Denny where the tracks from Sandy and Johnny had been re-recorded with more accomplished vocals and guitar playing. The complete Saga studio recordings were issued on the 2005 compilation Where The Time Goes.

By this time, she had abandoned her studies at art college and was devoting herself full-time to music. While she was performing at The Troubadour folk club, a member of the Strawbs heard her, and in 1967, she was invited to join the band. She recorded one album with them in Denmark, which was released belatedly in 1973, credited to Sandy Denny and the Strawbs: All Our Own Work. The album includes an early solo version of her best-known (and widely recorded) composition, "Who Knows Where the Time Goes?" A demo of that song found its way into the hands of American singer Judy Collins, who chose to cover it as the title track of an album of her own, released in November 1968 and prominently featured in the film The Subject Was Roses, thus giving Denny international exposure as a songwriter before she had become widely known as a singer.

== From Fairport to Fotheringay ==
After making the Saga albums with Alex Campbell and Johnny Silvo, Denny looked for a band that would allow her to stretch herself as a vocalist, reach a wider audience, and have the opportunity to display her songwriting. She said, "I wanted to do something more with my voice." After working briefly with the Strawbs, Denny remained unconvinced that they could provide that opportunity, and so she ended her relationship with the band.

Fairport Convention conducted auditions in May 1968 for a replacement singer following the departure of Judy Dyble after their debut album, and Denny became the obvious choice. According to group member Simon Nicol, her personality and musicianship made her stand out from the other auditionees "like a clean glass in a sink full of dirty dishes".

Beginning with What We Did on Our Holidays, the first of three albums she made with the band in the late 1960s, Denny is credited with encouraging Fairport Convention to explore the traditional British folk repertoire, and is thus regarded as a key figure in the development of British folk rock. She brought with her the traditional repertoire she had refined in the clubs, including "A Sailor's Life" featured on their second album together, Unhalfbricking. Framing Denny's performance of this song with their own electric improvisations, her bandmates discovered what then proved to be the inspiration for an entire album, the influential Liege & Lief (1969).

Denny left Fairport Convention in December 1969 to develop her own songwriting more fully. To this end, she formed her own band, Fotheringay, which included her future husband, Australian Trevor Lucas, formerly of the group Eclection.

They created one self-titled album, which included an eight-minute version of the traditional "Banks of the Nile", and several Denny originals, among them "The Sea" and "Nothing More". The latter marked her first composition on the piano, which was to become her primary instrument from then on. Fotheringay started to record a second album in late 1970, but it remained unfinished after Denny announced that she was leaving the group and producer Joe Boyd left to take up a job at Warner Brothers in California. Denny would later blame Boyd's hostility towards the group for its demise.

== Solo career and final years ==
Denny then turned to recording her first solo album, The North Star Grassman and the Ravens. Released in 1971, it is distinguished by its elusive lyrics and unconventional harmonies. Highlights included "Late November", inspired by a dream and the death of Fairport band member Martin Lamble, and "Next Time Around" a cryptogram about Jackson C. Frank, one of her many portraits in song.

Sandy, with a cover photograph by David Bailey, followed in 1972 and was the first of her albums to be produced by Trevor Lucas. As well as introducing eight new original compositions, the album marked her last recording of a traditional song, "The Quiet Joys of Brotherhood" (words by Richard Fariña), with Denny's ambitious multi-tracked vocal arrangement inspired by the Ensemble of the Bulgarian Republic.

Melody Maker readers twice voted her the "Best British Female Singer", in 1970 and 1971 and, together with contemporaries including Richard Thompson and Ashley Hutchings, she participated in a one-off project called the Bunch to record a collection of rock and roll era standards released under the title of Rock On.

Sandy Denny's symbol of three downward-pointing equilateral triangles

In 1971, Denny duetted with Robert Plant on "The Battle of Evermore", which was included on Led Zeppelin's 1971 album (Led Zeppelin IV); she was the only guest vocalist ever to appear on a Led Zeppelin album. In 1972 Denny had a small cameo on Lou Reizner's symphonic arrangement of the Who's rock opera Tommy. In a brief appearance, she sang the character of The Nurse on the track "It's a Boy," which also featured vocals from Pete Townshend.

In 1973, she married long-term boyfriend and producer Trevor Lucas and recorded a third solo album, Like an Old Fashioned Waltz. The songs continued to detail many of her personal preoccupations: loss, loneliness, fear of the dark, the passing of time and the changing seasons. The album contained one of her best loved compositions, "Solo", and featured a cover image by Gered Mankowitz.

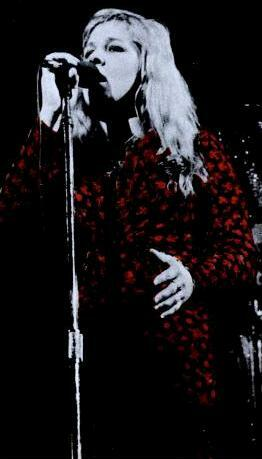
Denny in a trade ad for Fairport Convention's A Moveable Feast, 26 October 1974

In 1974, Denny returned to Fairport Convention (of which her husband was by then a member) for a world tour (captured on the 1974 album Fairport Live Convention) and a studio album, Rising for the Moon in 1975. Although her development as a soloist and songwriter had taken her further away from the folk roots direction that the band had pursued since Liege & Lief, seven of the eleven tracks on Rising for the Moon were either written or co-written by her.

Denny and Lucas left Fairport Convention at the end of 1975 and embarked on what was to become her final album Rendezvous. Released in 1977, the album sold poorly and Denny was subsequently dropped by Island Records. Denny gave birth to her only child, a daughter named Georgia, in July 1977 after relocating to the village of Byfield in Northamptonshire.

A UK tour to promote Rendezvous in autumn 1977 marked her final public appearances. The closing night at the Royalty Theatre in London on 27 November 1977 was recorded for a live album, Gold Dust, which, because of technical problems in the recording of the electric guitar, was belatedly released in 1998 after most of the guitars had been re-recorded by Jerry Donahue.

== Death ==
Linda Thompson would later note that Denny "really started going downhill in 1976" and demonstrated increasing levels of both manic and depressive behaviour. Depression, mood swings and the unravelling of her "tumultuous" marriage to Trevor Lucas heightened her drug (including alcohol) abuse, in the midst of which she learned that she was pregnant. Her daughter, Georgia, was born prematurely in July 1977. Much like her moods, Denny's interest towards her daughter appeared to oscillate between obsessive and unconcerned; friends recalled both frantic, middle-of-the-night phone calls about teething, as well as Denny "crashing the car and leaving the baby in the pub and all sorts of stuff".

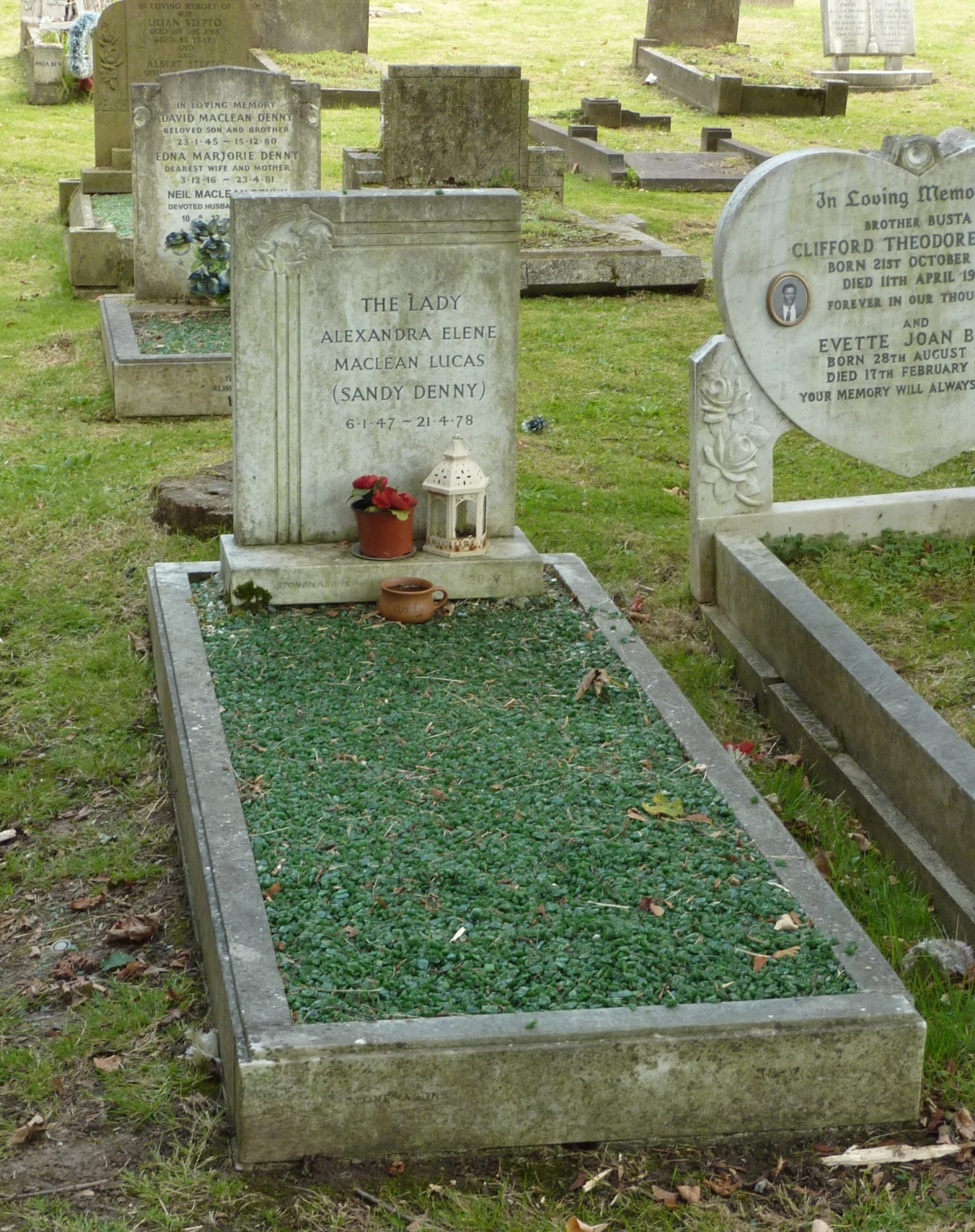
Sandy Denny's grave at Putney Vale Cemetery, London, in 2014

Friends would note that Denny had a history of purposely throwing herself off bar stools and down flights of stairs, presumably as a humorous pratfall in the manner of Peter Sellers’ Inspector Clouseau character. Several remembered this behaviour as "Sandy's party trick", while Dave Pegg's wife Chris stated, "She certainly did it in my house and it could be a very dramatic gesture, like self-harming. She could do it without hurting herself usually but I had a feeling there would be one time too many." Those who knew Denny said that her increasing level of alcohol abuse in the last years of her life led to an increasing number of falls (both accidental and deliberate), resulting in a growing number of injuries.

In late March 1978, while on holiday with her parents and baby Georgia in Cornwall, Denny was injured when she fell down a staircase and hit her head on concrete. Following the incident, she suffered from intense headaches; a doctor prescribed her the painkiller dextropropoxyphene, a drug known to have fatal side effects when mixed with alcohol. On 1 April, several days after the fall in Cornwall, Denny performed a charity concert at Byfield. The final song she performed was "Who Knows Where the Time Goes?"

At some unknown point during the first half of April 1978, Denny suffered yet another major fall at her home in Byfield. On 13 April, concerned about his wife's erratic behaviour and fearing for his daughter's safety, Trevor Lucas left the UK and returned to his native Australia with their child, leaving Denny without telling her. He sold their Austin Princess car in order to raise funds for the journey.

On discovering Lucas's departure, Denny went to stay at the home of her friend Miranda Ward. During this time, Denny apparently set up an appointment to speak with a doctor about her headaches, and also intended to get advice about her alcohol addiction. At some point after 8 am on 17 April, Denny fell into a coma. Ward was out of the house at the time, and had asked her friend Jon Cole (of the band the Movies) to check in on Denny. Cole entered the home at 3 pm, and found Denny unconscious at the foot of the staircase which led to the second floor of the house. She was rushed by ambulance to Queen Mary's Hospital in nearby Roehampton.

On 19 April, she was transferred to Atkinson Morley Hospital in Wimbledon. After receiving news that Denny was in a coma, Lucas returned from Australia. Doctors informed him that Denny was effectively brain-dead and her condition would not improve. She died on 21 April 1978 without regaining consciousness. Her death was ruled to be the result of a traumatic mid-brain haemorrhage and blunt force trauma to her head. She was 31 years old.

Her funeral took place on 27 April 1978 at Putney Vale Cemetery. After the vicar read Denny's favourite psalm, Psalm 23, a piper played "Flowers of the Forest", a traditional song commemorating the fallen of Flodden Field and one which had appeared on the 1970 Fairport album Full House.

The inscription on her headstone reads:

The Lady
Alexandra Elene
MacLean Lucas
(Sandy Denny)
6·1·47 – 21·4·78

== Posthumous releases ==
=== Official releases ===
Although Denny had a devoted following in her lifetime, she did not achieve mass market success. In the years since her death, her reputation has grown and there have been a number of releases.

==== 1985–1987 ====
A four-album box set entitled Who Knows Where the Time Goes? (1985) was produced by her widower Trevor Lucas and Joe Boyd and included a number of rare and previously unreleased tracks by Denny, either solo or with Fairport Convention (1968, 1969, 1974) and Fotheringay (1970). This was the first public indication that a large cache of unreleased material existed. A one-disc subset of these recordings was subsequently issued on CD by Island in 1987 entitled The Best Of Sandy Denny.

In 1987, a compilation of previously unreleased tracks recorded for the BBC by incarnations of Fairport including Denny was released on LP under the title Heyday, which was subsequently released on CD in 2001 and again, with extra tracks, in 2002; all tracks were later included, with others, on the 2007 four-CD box set Fairport Convention Live at the BBC. The initial purpose of this compilation was to document the more "American" material performed live by the What We Did on Our Holidays lineup of the band that never made it to vinyl, while the re-releases added additional songs as performed by the Unhalfbricking and Liege and Lief lineups.

Also in 1987, a VHS documentary, It All Comes 'Round Again, on Fairport Convention was released which contained excerpts of several audio recordings featuring Denny, plus a single poor-quality video recording of her singing her song "Solo" during her second stint with Fairport in 1974, as filmed by the University of Birmingham's "Guild TV" amateur organisation. The original tape of this recording has apparently been lost; however, "Like an Old Fashioned Waltz" does appear on the DVD documentary Sandy Denny Under Review and other tracks have been made available via YouTube in very poor quality.

==== 1988–1999 ====
In 1991, Joe Boyd issued a new version of Denny's All Our Own Work album with the Strawbs, entitled Sandy Denny and the Strawbs, on his Hannibal Records label. The album had strings added to some tracks, including "Who Knows Where the Time Goes?" and further tracks with Denny on lead vocal.

Over the period 1988–1994, the Australian "Friends of Fairport" issued a series of subscriber-only cassette compilations drawing in the main on previously unreleased tapes from Trevor Lucas's collection (as stored in his attic in fact). Attic Tracks (AT) 1 (1988) contained out-takes from Sandy as well as some Fairport material and a few bizarre extras; AT 2 (1989) contained only Trevor Lucas material, no Denny; AT 3 (1989) entitled First and Last Tracks comprised 1966–1967 home demos and rare radio tracks, as well as 9 "pre-overdub" songs from Denny's last concert at the Royalty Theatre, London, on 27 November 1977 (a partial alternative to the later, overdubbed CD release Gold Dust), and AT 4 (1994): Together Again comprised one side of Lucas and the other of Denny in the form of more home demos, studio outtakes, and 4 tracks from a 1973 BBC radio concert. A cut-down version of these tracks (18 songs) was subsequently compiled for CD release by the Australian label Raven Records in 1995 called Sandy Denny, Trevor Lucas and Friends: The Attic Tracks 1972–1984.

In 1997, a one-disc compilation of Denny's solo BBC recordings was released as The BBC Sessions 1971–1973 on Strange Fruit Records. Due to rights issues it was withdrawn on the day of release, thereby creating a highly collectible disc (up until the release of the comprehensive Live at the BBC box set in 2007). This release was followed in 1998 when Denny's final performance at the Royalty Theatre, entitled Gold Dust, was issued on CD, following a degree of re-recording and overdubbing of selected backing parts to replace reportedly unsatisfactory originals.

In 1999, a single-disc compilation, Listen Listen – An Introduction to Sandy Denny, was released on Island Records comprising 17 previously released tracks taken from her four Island solo albums.

==== 2000–2005 ====
No More Sad Refrains: The Anthology was released by Universal Records in 2000. When first released, this compilation had several rare tracks, including "The Ballad of Easy Rider" from the Liege and Lief sessions, "Learning the Game" and "When Will I Be Loved" from the Bunch album Rock On, "Here in Silence" and "Man of Iron" from the Pass of Arms soundtrack, and a previously unissued demo of "Stranger to Himself".

In 2002, a previously unreleased, two-CD live US concert recording by Fairport Convention from 1974 featuring Denny was released on the Burning Airlines label. Entitled Before The Moon, it originated from a radio broadcast from Ebbets Field in Denver, Colorado, on 23/24 May 1974. The second disc was a limited release bonus with the original release comprising the second set from the same concert. This recording was re-released in shortened form as a single disc in 2011 on the It's About Music label entitled Fairport Convention with Sandy Denny: Ebbets Field 1974.

Also in 2002, the American A&M Records issued a budget-price "20th Century Masters" compilation called The Best of Sandy Denny with 10 tracks all available on Denny's studio albums.

In 2004 a second comprehensive five-CD box set was released on the Fledg'ling record label called A Boxful of Treasures that included many unreleased recordings, in particular a whole disc of acoustic demos, many recorded at her home in Byfield that was highly prized amongst fans and critics alike, who had long asserted that her solo performances showed her work in its best light, revealing the true quality of her vocal style and compositions. Also in 2004, the Spectrum label issued a 16-track compilation of previously released material entitled The Collection: Chronological Covers & Concert Classics, including a mix of studio recordings and live excerpts from the Gold Dust Royalty concert.

In 2005, remastered versions of all Denny's solo albums came out with bonus tracks. Also in 2005, a single CD compilation entitled Where the Time Goes: Sandy '67 was released on Castle Music containing all of Saga's Denny album tracks (including the alternative recordings on It's Sandy Denny), together with two self accompanied tracks from Denny's recordings with the Strawbs.

==== 2006–2008 ====
In 2006, a DVD documentary entitled Sandy Denny Under Review was released on the Sexy Intellectual label, containing interviews with her contemporaries plus brief excerpts from her audio recordings, in addition to some short video clips including two of the poor quality video recordings with Fairport from Birmingham University, two with Fotheringay from German TV's Beat-Club (further details given below), and three solo excerpts from the only surviving BBC footage on One In Ten (details as given in the next paragraph).

A four-disc box set, Sandy Denny Live at the BBC, came out in September 2007, containing (virtually) all of the known solo recordings made by Denny for that UK broadcaster including two complete concerts, one at the Paris Theatre in 1972 and one recorded for Sounds on Sunday in 1973, plus a range of other material spanning the years 1966–1973. Disc 3 of this set was a DVD containing surviving TV footage from a 1971 BBC One in Ten session comprising solo performances by Denny of "The North Star Grassman and the Ravens", "Crazy Lady Blues" and "Late November", along with digitised excerpts from her diaries, rare photos and a discography. A one-disc subset of this box set entitled The Best of the BBC Recordings was subsequently released in 2008.

A companion box set, Fairport Convention Live at the BBC, also came out in 2007 and covered equivalent live recordings by Fairport over the period 1968–1974, of which the first two discs (1968–1970) contain examples from Denny's time with that group.

In 2008, Jerry Donahue completed the unfinished second Fotheringay album begun in the autumn of 1970. It was released to general acclaim as Fotheringay 2 and contained some notable Denny performances, in particular earlier versions of two Denny compositions, "Late November" and "John the Gun", and performances of the traditional songs "Gypsy Davey" and "Wild Mountain Thyme". Also in 2008, Island Remasters issued a double CD entitled The Music Weaver (Sandy Denny Remembered) which contained a mix of better known tracks and less well known demos and live recordings, previously released but not in companion with studio sessions. This compilation is also one of the very few to contain the Led Zeppelin track "The Battle Of Evermore" which features a rare guest appearance by Denny.

==== 2010–2012 ====
In 2010, a large 19-CD retrospective box set, simply titled Sandy Denny, was released by Universal/Island Records in a limited edition of 3,000 copies. It contained Denny's entire catalogue of studio recordings, including her work with the Strawbs, Fairport Convention, Fotheringay and as a solo artist. The compilation also included a large number of outtakes, demos, live recordings, radio sessions and interviews. The box set was released to good reviews, including a 5-star review in Uncut and a 4-star review in The Guardian.

In late 2010, Thea Gilmore was commissioned by Denny's estate, in conjunction with Island Records, to write melodies to unrecorded lyrics found in Denny's papers. The resulting album, Don't Stop Singing, was released in November 2011 to generally good notices, including 4-star reviews in The Independent and The Guardian among others. On 21 April 2012, the single "London" was released as an exclusive Record Store Day 7″ single.

Further recordings by Denny were released in 2011, including a German recording of Fotheringay in concert released as Essen 1970 on the Garden of Delights label. The performance was remastered by original band member Jerry Donahue. This release was followed by 19 Rupert Street, a home recording of a rehearsal featuring Denny and Alex Campbell recorded at his flat in August 1967. This release is notable for the fact that Denny performs a number of tracks that are not available in any other versions, including a cover of "Fairytale Lullaby" by John Martyn. This CD was put out by Sandy's former Strawbs bandmate Dave Cousins on his Witchwood label.

Two-disc "Deluxe Editions" of Denny's album reissues appeared in 2011 and 2012 with additional tracks; the 2012 Deluxe Edition of Sandy included a previously unreleased eight-song solo set from her 1973 U.S. tour recorded at Ebbet's Field in Denver, Colorado. A similar two-disc reissue of Fairport Convention's Rising for the Moon also included, for the first time, the complete 1974 L.A. Troubadour performance of Fairport with Denny back on board, prior to the official announcement of her re-joining the group.

On account of unprecedented demand for, and exhaustion of supply of the limited edition 19-CD set cited above, in October 2012 a limited edition four-CD version was released entitled The Notes and The Words: A Collection of Demos and Rarities, containing "75 songs that represent the cream of the rarities, demos and outtakes from the box set". Limited to 3,500 copies, this compilation is also now out-of-print.

==== 2013–2017 ====
In 2013, Spectrum records issued a single-disc CD entitled The Lady – The Essential Sandy Denny that comprised 15 previously issued tracks, generally from Denny's well known albums.

The following year, 2014, saw the release of another Fairport live U.S. radio broadcast from their 1974 tour with Denny, on RockBeat Records, entitled Live 1974 (My Father's Place), comprising 11 live tracks, most featuring Denny, recorded at the New York rock club My Father's Place.

A four-disc Fotheringay retrospective, Nothing More: The Collected Fotheringay, was released on 30 March 2015. This is the most comprehensive compilation of the group's recordings, and contains, in addition to all the tracks on Fotheringay and Fotheringay 2 as both final studio versions and demos/alternate takes, the complete live concert set from Rotterdam in 1970 (including several previously unreleased tracks), seven Fotheringay tracks recorded in session for BBC radio (which had previously circulated only as bootlegs), plus a DVD disc containing four performances by Fotheringay recorded for the German Beat-Club TV series in 1970, which considerably augment the otherwise sparse known TV footage of Denny in particular.

May 2016 saw the release of a two-CD compilation, I've Always Kept A Unicorn – The Acoustic Sandy Denny which collected together many previously released, but dispersed, acoustic and/or demo versions of songs better known from their album counterparts, as well as three previously unreleased demos (with Linda Thompson, at the time Linda Peters) from 1972's Rock On sessions by one-off band The Bunch.

A seven-CD box set by Fairport Convention entitled Come All Ye – The First 10 Years was released in July 2017 and contains a small number of additional, previously unreleased demos and alternate takes featuring Denny during her first tenure with the band over the period 1968–1969. Tracks not previously available include versions of Joni Mitchell's Eastern Rain, an a capella version of Nottamun Town, alternative takes of Autopsy and Who Knows Where the Time Goes, and a rehearsal version of The Deserter.

=== Unofficial releases and audience tapes ===
In addition to the authorised material listed above, a number of unofficial/unauthorised compilations exist plus a range of audience recordings of varying quality, none of which would likely see the light of day as commercial issues but are of interest to a sector of Denny's audience on either historic or aesthetic grounds, often providing alternative views of songs known otherwise only from their commercially released versions. The first available unauthorised/bootleg CDs available in the 1980s and 1990s comprised principally off-air and other obscure material under such titles as Borrowed Thyme, Poems from Alexandra, Dark the Night, Wild Mountain Thyme and One Last Sad Refrain; such compilations are now largely superseded by the subsequent availability of most of the off-air material in much better quality as official releases as described above.

Of more enduring interest are audience tapes of shows of which no "official" tapes survive. These include some early shows by Fairport Convention; a performance by Fotheringay at the 1970 Tenth National Jazz and Blues Festival, held at Plumpton Race Track, Streat, East Sussex, England; "solo" shows by Denny (on occasion with a small band including, among others, Richard Thompson) at the 1971 Lincoln Folk Festival and at the Eltham Well Hall Open Theatre in 1972; performances from York University and Guildhall, Newcastle upon Tyne, also in 1972; an early 1972 U.S. performance from The Bitter End in New York; and several sets (Birmingham and Croydon) from her final 1977 tour in addition to the officially released Gold Dust album; plus quite a large number of recordings strongly featuring Denny as part of the re-formed Fairport Convention over the period 1974–1975. The majority of these can be fairly easily located via relevant internet searches and, in addition, can be readily downloaded from archival music servers such as Sugarmegs (Sandy Denny concerts listed under "S": SugarMegs Streaming Server, Fairport and Fotheringay under "F": SugarMegs Streaming Server).

== Legacy ==
=== Estate and family ===
Since 2019 Denny's Estate has been managed by her daughter Georgia Rose Lucas and Elizabeth Hurtt A number of unreleased recordings of Sandy Denny from the collection of Trevor Lucas, her husband and Georgia's father, have subsequently been the basis for posthumous releases of Denny's work including those on The Attic Tracks.

Georgia gave birth to twin daughters on 29 April 1997, and a tribute album, Georgia on Our Mind, featuring many of Sandy Denny's former bandmates and friends, was compiled in the children's honour. In 2006 Georgia flew to Britain from Australia to accept on her mother's behalf the BBC Radio 2 Folk Awards award for Most Influential Folk Album of All Time, which was given for Fairport Convention's Liege & Lief on which Denny was lead singer.

Georgia Lucas administers the Official Sandy Denny Facebook. In August 2026 she compiled and published Sandy Denny: A People's History with Spenwood Books. Under the name Georgia Bass Katt, she has released her own DJ-based music.

=== Tributes ===
Since Sandy Denny's death in 1978 many musical tributes have been made to her. Dave Cousins of the Strawbs wrote "Ringing Down the Years" in memory of Denny shortly after her death. Dave Pegg of Fairport Convention recorded the tribute "Song for Sandy" on his 1983 solo album The Cocktail Cowboy Goes It Alone. Songs more specific to her death were Bert Jansch's "Where Did My Life Go" (from the album Thirteen Down) and Richard Thompson's "Did She Jump or Was She Pushed?" (from the album Shoot Out the Lights). Fellow Brit folk pioneers Spriguns changed the title of their 1978 album to Magic Lady after hearing of Denny's death while recording. In 1998, a variety of Daylily was named after her.

Denny's songs have been covered by numerous artists in the years since her death. Some of the notable acts to have covered her music include Yo La Tengo, former Marillion frontman Fish, who covered "Solo" on his album Songs from the Mirror, Cat Power, Judy Collins, Nanci Griffith and Nina Simone. Kate Bush mentioned Denny in the lyric of "Blow Away (For Bill)", as one of the musicians to greet Bill in Heaven and is the third track on Bush's 1980 album Never for Ever. In 1984, Clann Eadair released the single "A tribute to Sandy Denny", featuring Phil Lynott on vocals.

Several radio specials have been produced about Denny's life and music, including BBC Radio 2's The Sandy Denny Story: Who Knows Where the Time Goes. In 2007, Denny's song "Who Knows Where the Time Goes?" also received BBC Radio 2's 2007 Folk Award for "Favourite Folk Track of All Time". In 2010, she was recognized by NPR in their 50 Great Voices special series.

In April 2008, a tribute concert was held at The Troubadour in London, to mark the thirtieth anniversary of Denny's death. Those taking part included Martin Carthy, Linda Thompson and Joe Boyd.

A more extensive tribute was given later that year in December at the Southbank in the Queen Elizabeth Hall called The Lady: A Tribute to Sandy Denny with a band composed of members of Bellowhead, the evening featured a mix of young folk acts like Jim Moray and Lisa Knapp alongside those that had known and worked with Denny such as Dave Swarbrick and Jerry Donahue. These acts were joined by performers from outside the world of folk like PP Arnold and Marc Almond. The concert, which primarily featured songs written by Denny, received a four-star review in The Guardian. In May 2012 the Southbank concert was expanded into an eight date UK tour called The Lady: A Homage to Sandy Denny. The tour showcased Sandy's entire songbook taking in her work with Fairport Convention, Fotheringay, her solo career and the new songs completed by Thea Gilmore on her album Don't Stop Singing.

The band was, once again, composed of members of Bellowhead. Other acts performing included the aforementioned Thea Gilmore and up-and-coming folk acts Lavinia Blackwall of Trembling Bells, Blair Dunlop and Sam Carter, alongside more established folk stars Maddy Prior, Dave Swarbrick and Jerry Donahue. The line-up was completed with performers not normally associated with the folk scene; Green Gartside, Joan Wasser (also known as Joan As Police Woman), and PP Arnold. The tour was well received, obtaining a four-star review in The Times. The London concert at the Barbican was filmed for BBC4, and broadcast in a 90-minute programme titled The Songs of Sandy Denny in November 2012.

In April 2016 Denny was inducted into the BBC Radio 2 Folk Awards Hall of Fame.

Alela Diane recorded the tribute "Song for Sandy" on her album Cusp, released in February 2018. The song reflects on Denny's final tragic days and her orphaned baby daughter.

In 2023, Rolling Stone ranked Denny at number 164 on its list of the 200 Greatest Singers of All Time.

In May 2026 Ade Edmondson, star of The Young Ones, The Comic Strip Presents and Bottom, chose Denny as the subject for the BBC Radio 4 series Great Lives, saying: "I think a large part of my Englishness comes from Sandy Denny." The programme included archive of Richard Thompson, Mick Houghton and Denny herself, plus help from author Patrick Humphries, who interviewed her shortly before her death.

== Discography ==
=== Solo studio albums ===
- The North Star Grassman and the Ravens (1971)
- Sandy (1972)
- Like an Old Fashioned Waltz (1974)
- Rendezvous (1977)

=== Solo live albums ===
- The BBC Sessions 1971–1973 (1997)
- Gold Dust (1998) (live recording from final tour, 1977)
- Live at the BBC (2007 4-disc compilation)
- Sandy – Deluxe edition, 2012 – includes "Live at Ebbetts Field" (previously unreleased concert on disc 2)

=== With others ===
Denny's collaborations with other artists, including with Alex Campbell, Strawbs, Fairport Convention, Fotheringay, Led Zeppelin, and The Bunch, together with numerous posthumous releases and compilation albums, are detailed further on the Sandy Denny discography page.

== References and notes ==
General

- Heylin, Clinton (September 1988). "Sandy Denny". Record Collector. No. 109. pp. 61–66.
