= Heyday (Fairport Convention album) =

Live album by Fairport Convention
- Released: 1987
- Recorded: 28 May 1968 – 18 March 1969
- Genre: Folk rock
- Length: 38:55
- Label: Hannibal
- Producer: Bernie Andrews, Johnny Beerling, Keith Stewart

Fairport Convention chronology
House Full: Live at the L.A. Troubadour (1986)	Heyday (1987)	25th Anniversary Concert (1992)

Professional ratings
Review scores
Source	Rating
Allmusic	4.5/5 stars

Heyday: the BBC Radio Sessions 1968–69 is an album by the English folk rock band Fairport Convention first released in 1987. As its title suggests, it consists of live versions of songs recorded for John Peel's Top Gear radio programmes.

== Track listing ==
=== Side one ===
1. "Close the Door Lightly When You Go" (Andersen) – 2:56
2. "I Don't Know Where I Stand" (Mitchell) – 3:40
3. "Some Sweet Day" (Bryant, Bryant) – 2:18
4. "Reno, Nevada" (Farina) – 2:18
5. "Suzanne" (Leonard Cohen) – 5:27
6. "If It Feels Good, You Know It Can't Be Wrong" (Hutchings, Thompson) – 3:12

=== Side two ===
1. "I Still Miss Someone" (Johnny Cash, Roy Cash jr) – 2:37
2. "Bird on a Wire" (Cohen) – 2:36
3. "Gone, Gone, Gone" (Everly, Everly) – 2:10
4. "Tried So Hard" (Gene Clark) – 2:48
5. "Shattering Live Experience" (Nicol) – 3:19
6. "Percy's Song" (Bob Dylan) – 5:34

=== Bonus tracks on 2002 edition ===
1. "You Never Wanted Me" (Jackson C. Frank) – 3:18
2. "Nottamun Town" (traditional) – 3:37
3. "Fotheringay" (Sandy Denny) – 3:01
4. "Si tu dois partir" (Bob Dylan) – 2:28
5. "Cajun Woman" (Richard Thompson) – 2:47
6. "Autopsy" (Sandy Denny) – 4:26
7. "Reynardine" (traditional) – 4:24
8. "Tam Lin" (traditional) – 7:49

== Personnel ==
Musicians:

- Ashley Hutchings – bass
- Martin Lamble – drums
- Richard Thompson – guitar
- Simon Nicol – guitar
- Ian Matthews, Richard Thompson, Sandy Denny – vocals
- Ric Grech - Violin on Cajun Woman and Si Tu Dois Partir
- Dave Swarbrick - Violin on Reynardine and Tam Lin
- Dave Mattacks - Drums on Reynardine and Tam Lin

Additional personal:

- Joe Boyd – liner notes
- Bernie Andrews – producer (tracks side 1: 1 to 3, 5, 6, side 2: 3, 6)
- Johnny Beerling – producer (tracks side 2: 2)
- Keith Stewart – producer (tracks side 1: 4, side 2: 1, 4, 5)
- Ashley Hutchings, Frank Kornelussen, Joe Boyd – compilation
