= Sandy Denny and the Strawbs =

Compilation album by Sandy Denny and the Strawbs
- Released: 1991
- Recorded: 1967 Copenhagen, Denmark
- Genre: Folk rock; progressive folk; bluegrass
- Length: 36:54
- Label: Hannibal
- Producer: Gustav Winckler
- Compiler: Joe Boyd

Sandy Denny chronology
Who Knows Where the Time Goes? (1985)	Sandy Denny and the Strawbs (1991)	The BBC Sessions 1971-1973 (1991)

Strawbs chronology
Preserves Uncanned (1990)	Sandy Denny and the Strawbs (1991)	Ringing Down the Years (1991)

Professional ratings
Review scores
Source	Rating
Allmusic	4/5 stars

Sandy Denny and the Strawbs is a compilation album of songs by Sandy Denny and Strawbs. The album is a reworking of tapes recorded by the band in Copenhagen in July 1967. Tracks from those recordings were first released on the Pickwick budget label in 1973 under the name All Our Own Work. The track listing on this album is slightly different and some of the songs have the original string arrangements that also were recorded in 1967.

== Track listing ==
=== Side one ===
1. "Nothing Else Will Do" (Dave Cousins) – 2:25
2. "Who Knows Where the Time Goes" (Sandy Denny) – 4:09
3. "How Everyone But Sam Was a Hypocrite" (Cousins) – 2:48
4. "Sail Away to the Sea" (Cousins) – 3:23
5. "And You Need Me" (Cousins) – 3:18
6. "Poor Jimmy Wilson" (Cousins) – 2:35

=== Side two ===
1. "All I Need Is You" (Cousins) – 2:23
2. "Tell Me What You See in Me" (Cousins) – 3:41
3. "I've Been My Own Worst Friend" (Cousins) – 2:42
4. "On My Way" (Cousins) – 3:07
5. "Two Weeks Last Summer" (Cousins) – 2:06
6. "Always on My Mind" (Tony Hooper) – 1:53
7. "Stay awhile With Me" (Cousins) – 2:24

== Personnel ==
- Sandy Denny – lead vocals, backing vocals, guitar
- Dave Cousins – lead vocals, backing vocals, guitar, banjo
- Tony Hooper – lead vocals, backing vocals, guitar
- Ron Chesterman – double bass

Additional personnel

- Ken Gudmand – drums
- Cy Nicklin – sitar

Other

- Svend Lundvig - string arrangement on 2, 5, 7, 13

== Recording ==
Recorded in Copenhagen, Denmark 1967.

The liner notes state "The original 1967 sessions" although the liner notes for All Our Own Work wrongly state August 1968. This is a discrepancy as both albums derive from the same source recordings. Joe Boyd writes he and Denny listened to a white label pressing of the album shortly before the release of Sgt. Pepper (June 1967).

- Gustav Winckler – producer
- Ivar Rosenberg – engineer
- Karl Emil Knudsen – co-ordination

== Release history ==
Region	Date	Label	Format	Catalog
	1991	Hannibal	LP	HNBL 1361
	1991	Hannibal	cassette	HNBC 1361
	1991	Hannibal	CD	HNCD 1361
