= If You Gotta Go, Go Now =

Song by Bob Dylan

- Dutch picture sleeve

Single by Bob Dylan
- B-side: "To Ramona"
- Released: August 18, 1967
- Recorded: January 15, 1965
- Studio: Columbia 30th Street, New York City
- Genre: Folk rock
- Length: 2:32
- Label: Columbia
- Songwriter: Bob Dylan
- Producer: Tom Wilson

Bob Dylan singles chronology
"Leopard-Skin Pill-Box Hat" (1967)	"If You Gotta Go, Go Now" (1967)	"Drifter's Escape" (1968)

"If You Gotta Go, Go Now" (sometimes subtitled "(Or Else You Got to Stay All Night)") is a song written by Bob Dylan in 1964. The first released version was as a single in the US by the UK group the Liverpool Five in July 1965, but this did not chart in the US despite receiving much airplay, particularly in the Pacific Northwest. Another British band, Manfred Mann, then issued the song as a single in September 1965 and had a number 2 hit. Fairport Convention also had a chart hit, with a French version, in 1969.

== Dylan's version ==
A live version of the song as performed by Dylan was recorded at Philharmonic Hall in New York on October 31, 1964, and eventually released with the rest of the concert on The Bootleg Series Vol. 6: Bob Dylan Live 1964, Concert at Philharmonic Hall in 2004.

Dylan began the recording for the studio version of "If You Gotta Go, Go Now" on January 13, 1965, during the first session for Bringing It All Back Home. Of the two acoustic takes completed, neither was used. He recorded the song again on January 15, producing four takes with a full band, plus backing vocalist Angeline Butler from the folk trio The Pilgrims. Take 4 was released on The Bootleg Series Volumes 1–3 (Rare & Unreleased) 1961–1991 in 1991, and the sessions are available on The Bootleg Series Vol. 12: The Cutting Edge 1965–1966.

On May 21, 1965, producer Tom Wilson edited together composites of several takes from January 15 and brought in unidentified vocalists to overdub additional backing vocals. This version was released as a single in the Netherlands in 1967, where it failed to chart.

No Dylan version was released in the US or the UK until the appearance of The Bootleg Series, which, as noted above, featured a different version of the song from the single. The song also appears on The Bootleg Series Vol. 6: Bob Dylan Live 1964, Concert at Philharmonic Hall, albeit in an acoustic, live form.

Additional versions from Dylan's 1965–1966 recording sessions are included on the Deluxe and Collector's Editions of The Bootleg Series Vol. 12: The Cutting Edge 1965–1966.

== Manfred Mann version ==
Another English band, Manfred Mann, then issued the song as a single in September 1965, and that version reached number 2 on the UK charts. Billboard said of the single: "this hard beat Bob Dylan material has all the earmarks of a smash hit that will spiral the group up the charts once again."

=== Charts ===
Weekly chart performance for "If You Gotta Go, Go Now"
Chart (1965–1966)	Peak position
Australia (Kent Music Report)	4
Finland (Mitä Suomi Soittaa?)	16
Ireland (IRMA)	4
Rhodesia (Lyons Maid)	5
Singapore (Radio Singapore)	8
South Africa (Springbok Radio)	4
Sweden (Kvällstoppen)	7
Sweden (Tio i Topp)	6
UK (Disc Weekly Top 30)	2
UK (Melody Maker Pop 50)	2
UK (New Musical Express Top 30)	2
UK (Record Retailer Top 50)	2
US (Cash Box Looking Ahead)	106
US (Record World Singles Coming Up)	112

== Fairport Convention version ==
"Si Tu Dois Partir"
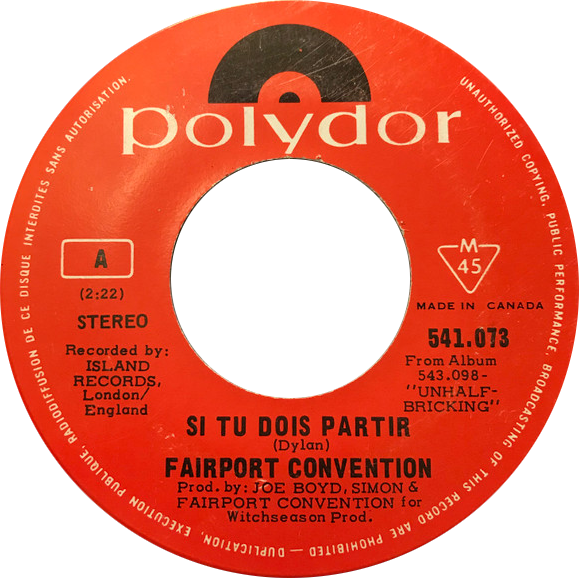
- Side A of the Canadian single

Single by Fairport Convention

from the album Unhalfbricking
- B-side: "Genesis Hall" (Richard Thompson)
- Released: July 1969
- Recorded: March 1969
- Studio: Sound Techniques, London
- Label: Island (UK); A&M (US)
- Songwriter: Bob Dylan
- Producers: Joe Boyd, Simon Nicol and Fairport Convention

Fairport Convention singles chronology
"I'll Keep It with Mine" (1968)	"Si Tu Dois Partir" (1969)	"If (Stomp)" (1969)

Official Audio
- "Si tu dois partir" on YouTube

Fairport Convention also took the song onto the charts, albeit in an unusual fashion: the group translated the song into French as "Si tu dois partir". Recorded for their Unhalfbricking album, the song was issued as a single in 1969, on the Island label in the UK and on the A&M label in the US. It was the band's only charting single, reaching number 21 and staying in the British Chart for nine weeks.
