= Rendezvous (Sandy Denny album) =

Studio album by Sandy Denny
- Released: May 1977
- Recorded: April – June 1976
- Studios: Island Studios (London); CBS (London); Strawberry Studios (Stockport); Sound Techniques (London)
- Genre: folk rock
- Length: 39:02
- Labels: UK: Island, 1977 (ILPS 9433); US: Hannibal, 1986 (HNBL 4422)
- Producer: Trevor Lucas

Sandy Denny chronology
Like an Old Fashioned Waltz (1973)	Rendezvous (1977)	Who Knows Where the Time Goes? (1985)

Rendezvous is the fourth and final studio album by English folk rock singer-songwriter Sandy Denny, released on Island Records in May 1977, and the final album released during her lifetime.

== Background ==
Sandy Denny and Trevor Lucas left Fairport Convention at the end of 1975 and Denny embarked on Rendezvous in the spring of 1976. Trevor Lucas produced the album with a contemporary rock sound designed to turn Denny into a mainstream act. The album is now generally thought to be overproduced with an excess of strings, backing vocals and instrumental overdubs. Despite this the album is felt to contain some of her finest compositions, and showed someone continuing to widen and deepen their songwriting craft, and who was responsive to new influences: "Gold Dust" with its Caribbean feel; the soulful torch songs "Take Me Away" and "I'm A Dreamer"; and, most ambitious of all, a seven-minute orchestral tribute to the English pastoral symphony in the style of Vaughan Williams called "All Our Days" recorded live at CBS Studios.

The punishing world tour with Fairport Convention throughout 1974 and 1975, coupled with Denny's heavy drinking and smoking, inevitably took a toll on her voice and by now much of its bell-like purity had gone, but the control and power were still there along with her subtle phrasing and characteristic grace notes. For the first time in years Denny recorded portions of the album live including an extraordinary session at Basing Street on 25 April, where "Full Moon," "No More Sad Refrains," and "I'm A Dreamer" were cut live with the band and strings in a single day. A selection of cover versions were recorded for the album: "I Wish I Was a Fool for You (For Shame of Doing Wrong)" by Richard Thompson, the only post-Fairport recording she made of a song by her former bandmate; "Silver Threads and Golden Needles," which had been attempted years earlier for the first Fotheringay album in 1970; "Losing Game" by The Flying Burrito Brothers; and "Easy to Slip" by Lowell George; the latter two were discarded from the final record. Several Denny originals were also recorded and not used, including '"Full Moon," "By the Time It Gets Dark," and "Still Waters Run Deep."

The majority of the album was recorded in a week of sessions between 23 April and 7 June at Basing Street and Island Studios; further sessions from the 9th to the 18th of June were largely devoted to extensive mixing and overdubs. The album, originally entitled Gold Dust, was finished by July and due to come out in October 1976, but Island repeatedly delayed the release and it finally came out in May 1977 when Denny was pregnant and unable to undertake a promotional tour. During this delay Denny returned to the studio to record a cover version of Elton John's "Candle in the Wind," which was added to the album in place of her own composition "Still Waters Run Deep." Both tracks were later released on a single. One last session, to record Bryn Haworth's "Moments," took place days before the album's release, and this was Denny's final studio recording.

The album was the only solo album of Denny's not to be issued in a gatefold. However, there was a black card inner sleeve with the lyrics reproduced in white type. The cover image was a composite of a location shot of Denny waiting on a street and a close-up studio portrait of her with heavy eye make up and wearing an auburn wig.

Having relocated to the village of Byfield in Northamptonshire in the mid-seventies, Sandy gave birth to her only child, a daughter called Georgia, in July 1977. A UK tour to promote Rendezvous was undertaken in the autumn and marked her final public appearances. The closing night at the Royalty Theatre in London on 27 November 1977 was recorded for an intended live album, Gold Dust, which was eventually released in 1998. Sandy Denny died the following year in April 1978 following complications after a fall.

== Critical reception ==
Professional ratings
Review scores
Source	Rating
AllMusic	3/5 stars
The Encyclopedia of Popular Music	3/5 stars

In 2005 AllMusic's reviewer Brett Hartenbach was less than enthusiastic about Trevor Lucas' production, saying "use of cumbersome strings, backup singers and bloated lead guitars weigh things down and bury some otherwise fine writing." His summation was that Rendezvous was "a flawed attempt at gaining a wider audience, by an artist who deserved better and was capable of the best." However, he did give the album a three-star rating of a possible five.
Rolling Stone's 2004 assessment was that having left her folk roots behind, "casting her as pop singer didn't quite work on Rendezvous."

== Track listing ==
All songs credited to Sandy Denny except where noted.

=== Side one ===
1. "I Wish I Was a Fool for You (For Shame of Doing Wrong)" (Richard Thompson) – 4:25
2. "Gold Dust" – 3:54
3. "Candle in the Wind" (Elton John, Bernie Taupin) – 4:08
4. "Take Me Away" – 4:23
5. "One Way Donkey Ride" – 3:34

=== Side two ===
1. "I'm a Dreamer" – 4:45
2. "All Our Days" – 7:25
3. "Silver Threads and Golden Needles" (Jack Rhodes, Dick Reynolds) – 3:40
4. "No More Sad Refrains" – 2:48

=== Bonus track on the 1991 Hannibal Records CD issue (deleted) ===
1. "Full Moon" – 4:30

=== Bonus tracks on 2005 Island Records remastered re-issue ===
1. "Still Waters Run Deep" – 2:54 (B-side of the single "Candle in the Wind")
2. "Full Moon" – 4:28
3. "I'm a Dreamer" (demo) – 4:14
4. "Easy to Slip" (Lowell George, Martin Kibbee) – 3:25
5. "Moments" (Bryn Haworth) – 3:43

== Personnel ==
- Sandy Denny - lead vocals, acoustic guitar (5), piano (6/9)
- Jerry Donahue - electric guitar (1/6/8–9)
- Junior Murvin - electric guitar (2)
- Richard Thompson - electric guitar (3)
- Bob Weston - electric guitar (4)
- Trevor Lucas - acoustic guitar (6/9)
- John (Rabbit) Bundrick - organ (1), synthesizer (1), piano (8)
- Steve Winwood - organ (2/4/5), clavinet (2), piano (4), electric piano (5)
- John Gillespie - piano (3)
- Pat Donaldson - bass (1–2/4–6/8–9)
- Dave Pegg - bass (3)
- Dave Mattacks - drums (1–4/6/9), tambourine (1)
- Timi Donald - drums (5/8)
- Brother James - congas (2)
- Dick Cuthell - flugelhorn (2)
- Benny Gallagher & Graham Lyle - backing vocals (3)
- Sue Glover & Sunny Leslie - backing vocals (4/5)
- Kay Garner & Clare Torry - backing vocals (6)
- The Ladybirds - backing vocals (8)
- The Silver Band: John Hudson, Alan Holmes, Ray Grand, Gordon Bland, David White, Robert Richards, Peter Lockett & Philip Goodwin
- Harry Robinson - orchestral arrangements (3/6/7)
- Steve Gregory - brass arrangements (4)
- Robert Kirby - silver band arrangement (8)

=== Other Credits ===
- Engineered - John Wood
- Mastering - John Marino, Sterling Sounds
- Sleeve Design - Bloomfield/Travis
