= Whispering Grass =

Popular song

Song
- Songwriters: Fred Fisher, Doris Fisher

"Whispering Grass (Don't Tell the Trees)" is a popular song written by Fred Fisher and his daughter Doris Fisher. The notion of "whispering grass", which reveals a person's secrets, extends back to Greek mythology, notably the myth of Midas.

The song was first recorded by Erskine Hawkins & His Orchestra in 1940. The Ink Spots featuring Bill Kenny also recorded it the same year. A live instrumental version was played and recorded by Johnny Hodges with Duke Ellington and his orchestra in the Cristal Ballroom, Fargo, North Dakota, also in 1940.

The song has been covered by numerous singers, including Ringo Starr on his 1970 album Sentimental Journey and Sandy Denny on her 1974 album Like an Old Fashioned Waltz. In 1975, a version by the British actors Windsor Davies and Don Estelle topped the UK singles chart.

== Windsor Davies and Don Estelle version ==
"Whispering Grass"

Single by Windsor Davies and Don Estelle

from the album It Ain't Half Hot Mum
- B-side: "I Should Have Known"
- Released: April 25, 1975
- Recorded: January 25, 1975
- Studio: Abbey Road Studios, London
- Length: 3:06
- Label: EMI
- Songwriters: Fred Fisher; Doris Fisher
- Producer: Walter J. Ridley

Windsor Davies and Don Estelle singles chronology
"Whispering Grass" (1975)	"Paper Doll" (1975)

A version of "Whispering Grass" was recorded in 1975 by the British actors Windsor Davies and Don Estelle. Davies and Estelle played the characters of Battery Sergeant Major Williams and Gunner "Lofty" Sugden, respectively, in the BBC sitcom It Ain't Half Hot Mum, which had begun the previous year and which centred on a British Armed Forces concert party stationed in Burma during the Second World War. The series proved extremely popular, and had made household names of Davies and Estelle. Estelle was a trained singer and wanted to use his new-found fame to launch a recording career, but producer Wally Ridley decided that it would be better to record an album capitalizing on the sitcom's success, featuring the cast of the show performing monologues and popular songs from the 1940s era. Issued on EMI Records, the It Ain't Half Hot Mum album was recorded in a single day at EMI's Abbey Road Studios in London on January 25, 1975.

Davies and Estelle had been planning a cabaret act based on their characters from the TV show, and "Whispering Grass" was one of the songs that they had planned to include in their show. According to Estelle, when Ridley asked for suggestions for songs to include on the It Ain't Half Hot Mum record, Estelle put forward "Whispering Grass". As Davies did not have a good singing voice, the song was recorded in a semi-comedic style, with Estelle singing in a straight manner and Davies providing spoken word verses and interjections in character as Battery Sergeant Major Williams. Estelle told Record Mirror that with his looks it would have been impossible to sing a romantic song and be taken seriously, and said, "Without the comedy element, I doubt if the song would have taken off." The backing vocals on the track were by the Mike Sammes Singers, with Sammes himself providing the bass note vocals that Davies mimed along to in performances of the song.

Ridley saw the song's potential as a single, and "Whispering Grass" was released on April 25, 1975, with the full credit of "Windsor Davies as B.S.M. Williams and Don Estelle as Gunner Sugden (Lofty)". It reached number one on the UK Singles Chart for three weeks from 7 June 1975. The single also reached the top five in Ireland, and was a minor hit in New Zealand in 1976 and in Australia in 1977, after It Ain't Half Hot Mum was broadcast in those countries.

=== Personnel ===
- Don Estelle – vocals
- Windsor Davies – vocals
- The Mike Sammes Singers – backing vocals
- Richard Leonard – piano

=== Charts ===
Weekly charts

Chart (1975–1977)	Peak position
Australia (Kent Music Report)	59
Ireland (IRMA)	4
New Zealand (Recorded Music NZ)	22
UK Singles (OCC)	1

Year-end charts

Chart (1975)	Position
UK Singles (British Market Research Bureau)	4

=== Certifications ===
Region	Certification	Certified units/sales
United Kingdom (BPI)	Gold	500,000^{^}
^{^} Shipments figures based on certification alone.
