= Unhalfbricking =

Studio album by Fairport Convention
- Released: July 1969
- Recorded: January–April 1969
- Studios: Sound Techniques and Olympic, London
- Genre: British folk rock
- Length: 38:51
- Languages: English and French
- Label: Island
- Producers: Joe Boyd; Simon Nicol; Fairport Convention

Fairport Convention chronology
What We Did on Our Holidays (1968)	Unhalfbricking (1969)	Liege & Lief (1969)

1969 US release

Singles from Unhalfbricking
- 1. "Si Tu Dois Partir" / "Genesis Hall" Released: July 1969

Unhalfbricking is the third studio album by the English folk rock band Fairport Convention. It is the first of two albums released by the band in 1969, and consists of a number of traditional English folk songs and several Bob Dylan songs which he had not yet released. It also features Sandy Denny's signature song "Who Knows Where the Time Goes?", which was subsequently covered by many other performers and is now regarded as a classic. The only traditional song on the album, "A Sailor's Life", is seen as pivotal in the development of English folk rock music.

It has been described by one critic as "a transitional album ... in which the group shed its closest ties to its American folk-rock influences and started to edge toward a more traditional British folk-slanted sound". The album gave the band their first UK chart success, reaching number 12 in the UK album chart (the second highest position in the band's entire career), while the single release, "Si Tu Dois Partir", achieved number 21 in the UK singles chart.

== Production ==
Fairport Convention had been invited to Bob Dylan's London music publishers to hear then-unreleased tracks from The Basement Tapes sessions. The band's bassist, Ashley Hutchings, said "We loved it all. We would have covered all the songs if we could." In the event, versions of "Percy's Song", "Million Dollar Bash" and "If You Gotta Go, Go Now" (retitled "Si Tu Dois Partir") were used on the album. The French lyrics for the latter were created during the interval of a performance at the Middle Earth Club. According to guitarist Simon Nicol: "I think the boredom factor was one of the reasons we came up with this wacky idea. Three or four punters joined us in the dressing room; they were either French visitors or students of French working in London, and happened to be there that night." "Percy's Song" and "Million Dollar Bash" had never been released before.

"Si Tu Dois Partir"
Sample of "Si tu dois partir", the single from Unhalfbricking

"A Sailor's Life"
Sample of "A Sailor's Life", the extended song in which folk and rock came together

The band's male vocalist Iain Matthews left during the recordings for Unhalfbricking to make his own album Matthews' Southern Comfort, after recording just one track, "Percy's Song". Sandy Denny sang lead vocals on all the other songs, including her own compositions, "Autopsy", and "Who Knows Where the Time Goes?". The latter was covered by many artists and is now viewed to be a classic. The lengthy "A Sailor's Life", a traditional English folk song collected by A. L. Lloyd, was already part of Denny's club repertoire. In particular, the version on Unhalfbricking has been described as "the turning point of Fairport's history from earlier contemporary Americana to English songs" and by AllMusic's Richie Unterberger as a "clear signpost to the future".

Guitarist Richard Thompson contributed two compositions to the album. The opening track, "Genesis Hall", is a slow 3/4 waltz, on which Simon Nicol played dulcimer, while Sandy Denny provided the vocals; it was the B-Side of the single release. Genesis Hall was the nickname of the former Bell Hotel in Drury Lane, which had become a squat in early 1969 and later became noted for a mass eviction by the police. In the view of Mojo magazine reviewer Mike Baines, "Thompson's writing reached maturity on 'Genesis Hall'". "Cajun Woman", which opens the second side of the album, features Dave Swarbrick's fiddle-playing in his first work with Fairport; having no electric pick-ups, the band improvised by smashing open a telephone and attaching the microphone to the instrument with an elastic band.

== Title and cover ==
The title arose from the band playing the word game Ghost while travelling to and from gigs. Its object was to "avoid completing a real word", and "Unhalfbricking" was Sandy Denny's creation.

Eric Hayes took the photo on the sleeve design for the UK release, which featured neither album title nor band name. The photo captured Denny's parents, Neil and Edna Denny, standing outside the family home at 9B Arthur Road, Wimbledon, South London, with the band distantly visible through the garden fence. St Mary's Church, Wimbledon, can be seen in the background. Joe Boyd later said "Unhalfbricking, then, that cover shot was taken in the early spring, right before the crash, I think; and that record came out in June".

Unhalfbricking's cover in the US, released by A&M Records, was even less informative. It consisted of a picture of circus elephants with a small inset image of the band, allegedly because "the group apparently so upset their American label that they replaced it with an image of trampolining elephants".

== Aftermath ==
On 11 May 1969, two months before the album was released, drummer Martin Lamble and Jeannie Franklyn, the girlfriend of guitarist Richard Thompson, were killed in a road accident as the band was returning from a concert in Birmingham. Simon Nicol later said:

That was a big watershed, I think. In the aftermath, we thought a lot about what to do, whether to call it a day. It had been fun while it lasted but it took a definite effort of will to continue. It had given us a lot but now it had taken away a lot: was it worth it if it was going to cost people their lives? Martin was only 18 or 19 years old. He would have gone on to have been so much more than just another drummer, another musician: there was something very special about him.

Ashley Hutchings also said in relation to the album cover photograph:

My memory of it is bound up with the terrible car crash. On the back cover we're all eating around a table. The shirt and the leather waistcoat I'm wearing are what I had on when the crash happened. I can clearly remember them being bloodstained. You don't forget things like that.

Unhalfbricking appeared, therefore, at a difficult time for the group, but was enthusiastically received. After a period of intense reflection about their future they decided to pursue the folk rock idea further and violinist Dave Swarbrick and drummer Dave Mattacks were invited to join full-time for the follow-up, Liege & Lief.

== Reception ==
Professional ratings
Review scores
Source	Rating
AllMusic	5/5 stars
Christgau's Record Guide	A−
The Encyclopedia of Popular Music	5/5 stars
Pitchfork	9.3/10
PopMatters	8/10 stars

AllMusic's Richie Unterberger described Unhalfbricking as "a transitional album for the young Fairport Convention, in which the group shed its closest ties to its American folk-rock influences and started to edge toward a more traditional British folk-slanted sound".

Rolling Stone's John Mendelsohn, reviewing Unhalfbricking alongside Liege and Lief, was supportive, describing it as "Fairport Convention at its best" and singling out "Percy's Song" in particular as "the album's gem". He was less complimentary about "A Sailor's Life", regarding it as overlong.

The album also gave the band their first UK chart success, spending a total of eight weeks in the UK album chart and reaching number 12. The single "Si Tu Dois Partir" spent nine weeks on the UK singles chart and reached number 21. Fairport Convention appeared on Top of the Pops on 14 August 1969, miming to the song and augmented by a roadie, Steve Sparks on percussion.

It was voted number 688 in the third edition of Colin Larkin's All Time Top 1000 Albums (2000). In 2004 Q placed Unhalfbricking at number 41 in its list of the 50 Greatest British Albums Ever, and in the same year The Observer, describing it as "a thoroughly English masterpiece", listed it at number 27 in its Top 100 British Albums. The following year, 2005, it was included in Robert Dimery's 1001 Albums You Must Hear Before You Die. The Sandy Denny track "Who Knows Where the Time Goes?" was voted "Favourite Folk Track of All Time" by listeners in the Radio 2 Folk Awards 2007. In 2010 Unhalfbricking was voted the second best Fairport Convention album after Liege & Lief by Mojo readers.

== Track listing ==
Side one
No.	Title	Writer(s)	Length
1.	"Genesis Hall"	Richard Thompson	3:35
2.	"Si Tu Dois Partir"	Bob Dylan	2:18
3.	"Autopsy"	Sandy Denny	4:20
4.	"A Sailor's Life"	Traditional; arranged by Denny, Thompson, Simon Nicol, Ashley Hutchings and Martin Lamble	11:08

Side two
No.	Title	Writer(s)	Length
5.	"Cajun Woman"	Thompson	2:42
6.	"Who Knows Where the Time Goes?"	Denny	5:08
7.	"Percy's Song"	Dylan	6:46
8.	"Million Dollar Bash"	Dylan	2:54

Bonus tracks on CD reissue
No.	Title	Writer(s)	Length
9.	"Dear Landlord"	Dylan	4:06
10.	"Ballad of Easy Rider" (Bob Dylan is not officially credited as a songwriter on "Ballad of Easy Rider".)	Roger McGuinn	4:55

== Release history ==
Unhalfbricking has been released on several occasions and in several formats:

Year	Country	Label and catalogue number	Format
1969	UK	Island ILPS 9102	LP
1969	US	A&M SP-4206	LP
1969	US	Hannibal 4418	cassette
1969	Germany	Island 849302	LP
1969	Italy	International Ricordi SPA SLIR-IL	LP
1969	Canada	Polydor 543-098	LP
1970	Australia	Festival/Island SFL 9333512	LP
1972	Japan	King/Island ICL-36	LP
1973	Australia	Festival/Island SFL 9333512	LP (reissue)
1974	Netherlands	Island Ariola 88163XAT	LP
1969	New Zealand	Festival Records SFL-933512	LP
1985	US	Carthage CGLP 4418	LP
1987	UK	Island CID 9102	CD
1987	Japan	Polystar P32D 25025	CD
1990	US	Carthage CGCD 4418	CD
1990	UK	Island IMCD 61 (Island Masters series)	CD
1991	US	Hannibal 4418	LP & cassette
1991	Japan	Polystar P32D 1125	CD
1995	US	Sammel 8424982	CD
2000	UK	Simply Vinyl SVLP 164	LP
2003	UK	Island IMCD 293 (Island Re-Masters series)	CD
2007	US	Simply Vinyl 00030726	LP
2008	US	Water 212	CD
2008	US	4 Men With Beards 158	LP

== Personnel ==
Fairport Convention

- Sandy Denny – lead vocals, harpsichord
- Richard Thompson – electric and acoustic guitars, electric dulcimer, piano accordion, organ, backing vocals
- Ashley Hutchings – bass, backing vocals
- Simon Nicol – electric and acoustic guitars, electric dulcimer, backing vocals
- Martin Lamble – drums, stacked chair backs on "Si Tu Dois Partir"

Additional personnel

- Iain Matthews – backing vocals on "Percy's Song"
- Dave Swarbrick – fiddle on "Si Tu Dois Partir", "A Sailor's Life", and "Cajun Woman" and mandolin on "Million Dollar Bash"
- Trevor Lucas – triangle on "Si Tu Dois Partir"
- Marc Ellington – vocals on "Million Dollar Bash"
- Dave Mattacks – drums on "Ballad of Easy Rider"

Production

- Recorded at Sound Techniques and Olympic Studios, London
- Engineer: John Wood
- Sleeve design: Diogenic Attempts Ltd.

== Certifications ==
Certifications for Unhalfbricking
Region	Certification	Certified units/sales
United Kingdom (BPI)	Silver	60,000^{‡}
^{‡} Sales+streaming figures based on certification alone.
