= Sandy (Sandy Denny album) =

Studio album by Sandy Denny
- Released: September 1972
- Recorded: November 1971 – May 1972
- Studio: Sound Techniques (London); Island Studios (London)
- Genre: Folk
- Length: 40:36
- Label: Island (UK) ILPS 9207; A&M (US)
- Producer: Trevor Lucas

Sandy Denny chronology
The North Star Grassman and the Ravens (1971)	Sandy (1972)	Like an Old Fashioned Waltz (1974)

Singles from Sandy
- 1. "Listen, Listen/Tomorrow Is a Long Time" Released: Island Records WIP 6142 (1972)

Professional ratings
Review scores
Source	Rating
Allmusic	4.5/5 stars
Encyclopedia of Popular Music	4/5 stars

Sandy is the second solo album by British folk rock musician Sandy Denny. It was released in September 1972.

== History ==
Work on the album began just a fortnight after her UK tour promoting her debut solo album, The North Star Grassman and the Ravens, ended in early November 1971 and continued through to May 1972. The first song recorded for the album was "The Quiet Joys of Brotherhood", a Richard Fariña lyric he had set to a traditional Irish melody "My Lagan Love"; Denny's ambitious multi-tracked vocal arrangement was inspired by the Ensemble of the Bulgarian Republic. Demo sessions continued at the recently constructed Manor Studio in Oxfordshire, the first studio owned by Richard Branson's Virgin label. It was here that Denny, together with contemporaries, recorded a one-off project called The Bunch, a collection of rock and roll era standards released under the title Rock On. That collection marked Trevor Lucas's debut as a producer for Island Records and he took the helm on Sandy; the album was once again engineered by John Wood. The Manor sessions resulted in rough versions of "Sweet Rosemary", "The Lady", "The Music Weaver", "Listen Listen", "For Nobody to Hear" and "Bushes and Briars". A further two tracks were begun but not finished: a cover version of fellow folk singer Anne Briggs's "Go Your Own Way My Love" and another Denny original "After Halloween", which was reworked three years later for Fairport Convention's Rising for the Moon album.

All of the album's songs were finished at Sound Techniques and Island studios in about five sessions between the end of April and late May, during which string arrangements by Harry Robinson were added and two further Denny compositions were recorded: "It Suits Me Well" and "It'll Take A Long Time". A cover version (the by now ubiquitous Bob Dylan cover) of "Tomorrow Is a Long Time" completed the LP. Allen Toussaint’s brass arrangement on "For Nobody To Hear" was recorded at Deep South Studio in Baton Rouge, Louisiana.

The guest musicians include Fairport Convention colleagues Richard Thompson and Dave Swarbrick, as well as Sneaky Pete Kleinow (of Flying Burrito Brothers fame) on steel guitar, and friend and fellow singer Linda Thompson on backing vocals.

The album was originally issued in a gatefold sleeve featuring on its front a photograph by David Bailey, which came to define Denny's public image. The gatefold of the LP opened to show the song lyrics handwritten by Denny herself and bordered by garlands of flowers drawn by Trevor Lucas's sister, the illustrator Marion Appleton. The back cover featured the track listing and credits. Radio One DJ Tony Blackburn picked the album's lead single, "Listen, Listen", as his single of the week in September 1972.

== Track listing ==
All tracks credited to Sandy Denny unless otherwise stated

1. "It'll Take a Long Time" - 5:13
2. "Sweet Rosemary" - 2:29
3. "For Nobody to Hear" - 4:14
4. "Tomorrow Is a Long Time" (Bob Dylan) - 3:56
5. "The Quiet Joys of Brotherhood" (Music: Traditional; Lyrics: Richard Fariña) - 4:28
6. "Listen, Listen" - 3:58
7. "The Lady" - 4:01
8. "Bushes and Briars" - 3:53
9. "It Suits Me Well" - 5:05
10. "The Music Weaver" - 3:19

The remastered and reissued version included five bonus tracks:

1. "Here In Silence" (Peter Elford, Don Fraser) - 3:53
2. "Man of Iron" (Peter Elford, Don Fraser) - 7:40
3. "Sweet Rosemary" [Demo Version] - 3:00
4. "Ecoute, Ecoute" - 3:59
5. "It'll Take a Long Time" [Live Version] - 5:22

== Personnel ==
- Sandy Denny - lead vocals, acoustic guitar (2, 6, 8), piano (7, 9, 10)
- Richard Thompson - electric guitar (1–4, 8, 9), acoustic guitar (1, 4), mandolin (6)
- Trevor Lucas - acoustic guitar (4, 9)
- Sneaky Pete Kleinow - pedal steel guitar (1, 4)
- Dave Swarbrick - violin (2, 5, 10)
- John Bundrick - organ (1), piano (4)
- Pat Donaldson - bass (1–4, 6, 8, 9)
- Timi Donald - drums (1–4, 6, 8, 9)
- John Kirkpatrick - concertina (9)
- Linda Thompson - vocals (4)
- Harry Robinson - string arrangement (6, 7, 10)
- Allen Toussaint - brass arrangement (3)
- uncredited musicians - autoharp (2), harmonica (9), flute organ (9)

== Production ==
- Producer: Trevor Lucas
- Recording Engineers: John Wood, Cy Frost
- Art Direction: n/a
- Photography: David Bailey
- Liner notes to 2005 re-release: David Suff
