= The North Star Grassman and the Ravens =

Studio album by Sandy Denny
- Released: September 1971 (UK)
- Recorded: March – May 1971
- Studio: Sound Techniques (London); Island Studios (London)
- Genre: Folk rock
- Length: 39:49
- Label: Island ILPS 9165 (UK)
- Producer: Sandy Denny, Richard Thompson, John Wood

Sandy Denny chronology
It's Sandy Denny (1970)	The North Star Grassman and the Ravens (1971)	Sandy (1972)

Professional ratings
Review scores
Source	Rating
AllMusic	3.5/5 stars
The Encyclopedia of Popular Music	3/5 stars
Record Collector	4/5 stars
The Rolling Stone Album Guide	3.5/5 stars

The North Star Grassman and the Ravens is a 1971 album by English folk rock singer-songwriter Sandy Denny. Built mostly around her own compositions, The North Star Grassman and the Ravens is distinguished by its elusive lyrics and unexpected harmonies.

== Chronology ==
Denny became a solo artist when her previous group Fotheringay dissolved. Half way through recording the group's second album, producer Joe Boyd left to take up a job with Warner Bros. in California, leaving the album unfinished. (The album was eventually released in 2008 as Fotheringay 2.) Denny then launched the sequence of solo albums that underlie the claim that she is one of Britain's finest recent singer-songwriters.

== Production ==
Two original compositions from the Fotheringay 2 sessions, "Late November", inspired by a dream and the death of Fairport Convention band member Martin Lamble, and "John the Gun" were re-worked for the album and supplemented by a further six self-penned songs and two cover versions, Bob Dylan's "Down in the Flood" and "Let's Jump the Broomstick", recorded by Brenda Lee. Sessions began with Andy Johns producing but in the end the album was produced by Denny herself, former Fairport Convention bandmate Richard Thompson and John Wood, who recommended to Denny the film-score arranger Harry Robinson, who added strings to "Next Time Around", a cryptogram about former boyfriend Jackson C. Frank (one of her many portraits in song) and "Wretched Wilbur". Robinson would arrange strings for Denny's further albums as well as for Nick Drake and other artists signed to the same company.

The first songs recorded were the traditional "Blackwaterside" and "Let's Jump the Broomstick" in March 1971 at Sound Techniques. Sessions continued the following month until the end of May at Island studios, where the album was completed with the cutting of the title track, a sea voyage as a metaphor for death inspired by the loss of her friend 'Tigger' (Paul Bamber) who was in the Merchant Navy.

A number of other songs were attempted and discarded during the course of the sessions including "Honky Tonk Women", "Walking the Floor Over You" and the traditional "Lord Bateman".

The album was issued in a gatefold sleeve with a distinctive cover photograph of Denny weighing seeds in an old fashioned apothecary shop. The image covered both the front and rear sleeve, and was taken by Keef (Macmillan) who went on to do a lot of work with another British female singer-songwriter: Kate Bush. A two-disc Deluxe Edition was released by Island Records in 2011. It features the original album plus outtakes and demos, including a previously unreleased instrumental version of Lord Bateman.

The band for the supporting tour consisted of Denny, Thompson (guitar), Gerry Conway (drums), and Dave Richards (bass).

== Reception ==
Spin wrote, "Richard Thompson produced and played unobtrusively on this, her best album. It has a deceptive simplicity, in lieu of the grandiose arrangements that muck up her later records."

== Track listing ==
All tracks are written by Sandy Denny, except where noted.

Side one
No.	Title	Writer(s)	Length
1.	"Late November"		4:28
2.	"Blackwaterside"	traditional	4:12
3.	"The Sea Captain"		3:09
4.	"Down in the Flood"	Bob Dylan	3:20
5.	"John the Gun"		4:38

Side two
No.	Title	Writer(s)	Length
6.	"Next Time Around"		4:26
7.	"The Optimist"		3:24
8.	"Let's Jump the Broomstick"	Charles Robins	2:42
9.	"Wretched Wilbur"		2:38
10.	"The North Star Grassman and the Ravens"		3:27
11.	"Crazy Lady Blues"		3:22
Total length:			39:49

=== 2011 deluxe edition re-release ===
Disc one
No.	Title	Writer(s)	Length
1.	"Late November"		4:28
2.	"Blackwaterside"		4:12
3.	"The Sea Captain"		3:09
4.	"Down in the Flood"		3:20
5.	"John the Gun"		4:38
6.	"Next Time Around"		4:26
7.	"The Optimist"		3:24
8.	"Let's Jump the Broomstick"		2:42
9.	"Wretched Wilbur"		2:38
10.	"The North Star Grassman and the Ravens"		3:27
11.	"Crazy Lady Blues"		3:22
12.	"Next Time Around" (demo)
13.	"Walking the Floor Over You" (duet with Richard Thompson)	Ernest Tubb
14.	"Lord Bateman" (previously unreleased instrumental)
15.	"If You Saw Thru My Eyes" (duet with Iain Matthews)

Disc two
No.	Title	Length
16.	"The Sea Captain" (rare demo)
17.	"The Optimist" (rare demo)
18.	"Wretched Wilbur" (rare demo)
19.	"Crazy Lady Blues" (rare demo)
20.	"Lord Bateman" (rare demo)
21.	"Late November" (BBC session — Bob Harris, 24/8/71)
22.	"The Lowlands of Holland" (BBC session — Bob Harris, 24/8/71)
23.	"Blackwaterside" (BBC session — Sounds on Sunday, 14/11/72)
24.	"The North Star Grassman and the Ravens" (BBC in concert — Paris Theatre, 16/3/72)
25.	"Bruton Town" (BBC in concert — Paris Theatre, 16/3/72)
26.	"Next Time Around" (BBC in concert — Paris Theatre, 16/3/72)
27.	"John the Gun" (BBC in concert — Paris Theatre, 16/3/72)

== Personnel ==
- Sandy Denny - lead vocals, acoustic guitar (2, 3, 11), piano (1)
- Richard Thompson - electric guitar (1–5, 7–9), acoustic guitar (6, 7, 9, 10), bass (7,11), accordion (2), vocals (4)
- Pat Donaldson - bass (1–3, 5, 8–10)
- Ian Whiteman - piano (4–8, 10, 11), flute organ (10)
- Gerry Conway - drums (1–7, 9–11)
- Trevor Lucas - acoustic guitar (1, 4–5, 8)
- Tony Reeves - bass (4, 6)
- Harry Robinson - string arrangements (6, 9)
- Jerry Donahue - electric guitar (1)
- Royston Wood, Robin Dransfield - backing vocals (5)
- Barry Dransfield - violin (5)
- Roger Powell - drums (8)
- Buddy Emmons - pedal steel guitar (11)
