= Like an Old Fashioned Waltz =

Studio album by Sandy Denny
- Released: June 1974 (UK / US)
- Recorded: May and August 1973
- Studios: Sound Techniques (London); A&M (Los Angeles)
- Genre: Folk rock
- Length: 42:55
- Label: Island ILPS 9258 (UK) / SW 9340 (US)
- Producers: Trevor Lucas, John Wood

Sandy Denny chronology
Sandy (1972)	Like an Old Fashioned Waltz (1974)	Rendezvous (1977)

Singles from Like an Old Fashioned Waltz
- 1. "Whispering Grass / Friends" Released: Island WIP 6176 (1973); 2. "Like an Old Fashioned Waltz / John the Gun (release cancelled)" Released: Island WIP 6195 (1974)

Like an Old Fashioned Waltz is the third solo album by English folk rock singer Sandy Denny, released in June 1974.

Although Denny originally hoped to tour in support of the album, difficulties with Island Records delayed its release from autumn 1973 to June 1974, by which time she had rejoined Fairport Convention.

== Background ==
The 1972 album Sandy failed to cross over to mass market success, a fact which greatly disappointed Denny; she had recently decided that she desired to be received as a notable music act among the ranks of Led Zeppelin or The Who, two bands with which Denny had performed as a guest vocalist. Denny decided that in order to establish her solo career, a record appealing to a new audience was required.

== Composition ==
The songs on Like an Old Fashioned Waltz saw Denny refining her songwriting craft, on a nostalgic panoramic song-cycle detailing many of her personal preoccupations: loss, loneliness, fear of the dark, the passing of time and the changing seasons.

Like an Old Fashioned Waltz features covers of two jazz songs remembered from her father's record collection: The Inkspots' "Whispering Grass" and Fats Waller's "Until The Real Thing Comes Along". Around this time, it was rumored that Denny was considering recording an album solely consisting of jazz standards (or possibly an entire cover album of songs written by The Inkspots), but the record never materialized.

== Production ==
=== Recording ===
Work began on the album whilst Denny was still promoting her previous LP Sandy. The first track recorded was "No End" at Walthamstow Assembly Hall on 3 December 1972 in a solo version accompanying herself on the piano (later abandoned in favour of a new recording with a band and strings). Denny embarked on a month-long tour of the US in April 1973, stopping at A&M Records' studios to record four songs; "Friends”, “Solo”, “At the End of the Day" and the new version of "No End" prior to a week-long residency at The Troubador in Los Angeles.

After a tour of Europe throughout June and July, sessions for the album resumed at Sound Techniques in London in August where the remaining tracks were recorded; "Carnival, Like an Old Fashioned Waltz, Dark the Night" and the two jazz standards "Whispering Grass" and "Until the Real Thing Comes Along". Harry Robinson added string arrangements to many of the tracks.

In addition to singing, Denny played acoustic guitar, piano and electric piano on "Like an Old Fashioned Waltz". Denny's Fairport Convention bandmate Richard Thompson performed lead guitar on "Solo" and "At The End of the Day".

=== Album cover ===
The album was originally issued in an embossed gatefold sleeve styled in the colours described in the album's title track (primrose, yellow and velvet green) and designed to look like an antique plate, with a floral motif drawn by Denny herself. The cover photograph by Gered Mankowitz depicts Denny in an old style image in the Edwardian style. The album's lyrics were reproduced in the gatefold.

A single of "Whispering Grass / Friends" was released in a sepia picture sleeve in the style of the album cover.

== Release ==
=== Reception and reviews ===
Professional ratings
Review scores
Source	Rating
Christgau's Record Guide	C+
Encyclopedia of Popular Music	3/5 stars

The album did not chart in the UK or elsewhere. In a contemporary review for The Village Voice, music critic Robert Christgau gave Like an Old Fashioned Waltz a "C+" and said that, apart from the "masterpiece" in "Solo", it is a "sluggish album".

In a retrospective review, AllMusic's Brett Hartenbach gave the album three-and-a-half out of five stars, saying "Denny expands on the more polished moments that her previous work, Sandy, had suggested. The tone throughout most of the record is melancholy and personal, with gentle piano, rich strings, and barely a trace of her British folk roots." Hartenbach went on to call the album's opening track, "Solo", one of Denny's "best songs."

=== Live band and abandoned tour ===
Several weeks after Like an Old Fashioned Waltz had been recorded, Sandy Denny married longtime boyfriend and bandmate Trevor Lucas on 20 September 1973 at Fulham Register Office. Shortly afterward, she put together a band comprising Pat Donaldson, Hughie Burns and Willie Murray, with intent to do an extensive tour in support of the album. The group recorded a session for BBC Radio on 14 November 1973 and also played a brief four-date tour around that time.

However, the release of Like an Old Fashioned Waltz was delayed from Fall 1973 to June 1974, by which time Denny had rejoined Fairport Convention. Several songs from the album were regularly played during the Fairport tour that year.

== Legacy ==
Songs from Like an Old Fashioned Waltz have been covered by a number of notable artists. Following Denny's death, Fairport Convention has sporadically performed the songs "Solo" and "It'll Take a Long Time". "Like an Old Fashioned Waltz" was recorded by Emmylou Harris on her 1983 album White Shoes. Eric Johnson and Susan Cowsill covered "At the End of the Day" for the 1995 compilation True Voices. Fish covered "Solo" on his 1993 album Songs from the Mirror.

== Track listing ==
All tracks credited to Sandy Denny unless otherwise stated

Side one

1. "Solo"
2. "Like an Old Fashioned Waltz"
3. "Whispering Grass" (Doris Fisher, Fred Fisher)
4. "Friends"
5. "Carnival"

Side two

1. "Dark the Night"
2. "At the End of the Day"
3. "Until the Real Thing Comes Along" (Sammy Cahn, Saul Chaplin, L.E. Freeman)
4. "No End"

The remastered CD version included four bonus tracks:

1. "At the End of the Day" (Alternate take without strings)
2. "King and Queen of England" (Demo recorded at Denny's home in Byfield 1974)
3. "Like An Old Fashioned Waltz" (Live at the LA Troubadour 01/02/1975)
4. "No End" (solo piano version recorded 03/12/1972)

== Personnel ==
- Sandy Denny – lead vocals, piano (1/2/4), acoustic guitar (5/6), electric piano (9)
- Richard Thompson – electric guitar (1/9)
- Trevor Lucas – acoustic guitar (1/7)
- Diz Disley – acoustic guitar (3/8)
- Jerry Donahue – electric guitar (4/7), acoustic guitar (5)
- Jean Roussel – organ (1)
- Ian Armit – piano (3/8)
- John (Rabbit) Bundrick – piano (5/9), electric piano (6), clavinet (6)
- Dave Pegg – bass (1–2/4–5/9)
- Danny Thompson – double bass (3/8)
- Pat Donaldson – bass (6/7)
- Dave Mattacks – drums (1–5/8–9)
- Gerry Conway – drums (6/7)
- Alan Skidmore – saxophone (8)
- Harry Robinson – string arrangements (1/2/4–7/9)
- Bob Leaper – brass arrangements (3/8)
