= Who Knows Where the Time Goes? =

Song by Sandy Denny

from the album Unhalfbricking (by Fairport Convention)
- Released: 1968
- Songwriter: Sandy Denny

Who Knows Where the Time Goes?
Excerpt from "Who Knows Where the Time Goes?" - 738 kb

"Who Knows Where the Time Goes?" is a song written by the English folk-rock singer and songwriter Sandy Denny.

== History ==
Denny recorded a first demo of the song in 1966. It was the second song she ever completed. She again recorded the song as a demo in 1967, singing and playing guitar on the track.

In 1967 she joined the folk band The Strawbs, and in 1968 she re-recorded the song, again with only her voice and guitar, for what became the Strawbs album All Our Own Work, which was not released until 1973. (This version has the opening line "Across the purple sky...")

The American folk singer Judy Collins heard a tape of the original demo recording in 1968 and decided to cover the song. She recorded her version in New York City on August 26, 1968, at A&R Recording's 799 7th Avenue studio. She released her recording first as the B-side of her version of "Both Sides, Now", and then as the title track of her album Who Knows Where the Time Goes, both released in 1968. Hers was the first commercially released recording of the song.

In 1968, Denny joined the folk-rock band Fairport Convention. She recorded the song on her second album with the band, the 1969 album Unhalfbricking. This version had more of a rock influence, although it retained its tranquil and contemplative spirit, with Richard Thompson playing the delicate guitar licks (that are fed through the right audio channel on the track). The song became a signature song for both Denny and Fairport Convention, and was subsequently covered by many artists.

It was the last song Denny sang at her last ever performance, before she died at age 31.

== Structure and lyric ==
The song is a reflection in three verses on observed events ("Across the evening sky all the birds are leaving"). Denny writes that she does not count time ("Before the winter's fire, I will still be dreamin'; I have no thought of time") and in the last line of the short chorus asks rhetorically, "Who knows where the time goes?". The last verse includes the lines "I am not alone while my love is near me, I know it will be so until it's time to go.”

== Cover versions ==
Versions have been recorded by, among others, Nanci Griffith, Eva Cassidy, Judy Collins, Nana Mouskouri, Susanna Hoffs and Matthew Sweet, Deanna Kirk, Eddi Reader, Julianne Regan (with Fairport Convention), Kate Rusby, Nina Simone (on her 1970 live album Black Gold), Barbara Dickson, The Lasses, Heather Masse (on the radio program A Prairie Home Companion), Dez Mona,, Kate Wolf (on her 1983 live album Give Yourself to Love). and Raye (Montreux Jazz Festival, 2026)

== Reception ==
In 2007, the Unhalfbricking version was voted "Favourite Folk Track of All Time" by listeners of BBC Radio 2.

Rufus Wainwright called it "one of the saddest songs ever written"; Nina Simone called it a "lovely, lovely thing"; and Linda Thompson said "I don’t find it to be sad. Great music is always uplifting to me. She was so young when she wrote it but it pinpoints exactly the feelings I have now, at 71. It also resonated strongly with me when I was a teenager. Love and loss portrayed so sweetly. A song for all ages."
