= Fairport Chronicles =

Compilation album by Fairport Convention
- Released: 1976
- Genre: Rock, folk rock
- Label: A&M
- Producer: Trevor Lucas, John Wood

Professional ratings
Review scores
Source	Rating
AllMusic	4.5/5 stars
Christgau's Record Guide	A−
Tom Hull – on the Web	B+

Fairport Chronicles is a 1976 compilation album of the British folk-rock band Fairport Convention, including songs from 1968 to the departure of the last original member in 1972. The double album is unique in that it was only released in the US, features original material and American covers over the traditional material usually associated with Fairport, and includes songs from side projects. All of the material was originally issued in the USA on A&M Records, which explains the exclusion of songs taken from their first, pre-Sandy Denny album, which was only later released in the United States.

== History ==
A mere two traditional songs are present: "Bridge Over The River Ash" from 1971's Angel Delight, and "Tam Lin" from 1969's seminal British folk-rock recording, Liege and Lief. Originals include Richard Thompson's "Tale in Hard Time", "Meet on the Ledge", "Genesis Hall", and "Farewell, Farewell" (all sung by Sandy Denny); Denny's "Who Knows Where The Time Goes" (a hit for Judy Collins and later covered by Eva Cassidy), "Come All Ye" (co-written with bassist Ashley "Tyger" Hutchings), "Listen, Listen" (from Denny's album, Sandy), and "Fotheringay"; "Walk Awhile", "Now Be Thankful", and the anti-war statement "Sloth" by Richard Thompson and fiddle/mandolin player Dave Swarbrick; and the gentle instrumental, "End of a Holiday", by perhaps the must unsung individual in the band, second guitarist Simon Nicol.

Although closely associated with the British folk movement, Fairport, from their formation in 1967, excelled at covering American folk and pop tunes, especially those of Bob Dylan and Joni Mitchell. Although no Mitchell songs made it onto this compilation, Bob Dylan is covered with "I'll Keep It with Mine", "Million Dollar Bash", and "Percy's Song". One of the album's highlights is Fotheringay's interpretation of Gordon Lightfoot's "The Way I Feel" (Fotheringay was Denny's post-Fairport band). The other two covers – Dion DiMucci's "My Girl The Month of May" and Buddy Holly's "Learning The Game" – are taken from the one-off album Rock On by an aggregation of Fairport members and friends collectively known as The Bunch.

== Track listing ==
Side one

1. "Tale in Hard Time" (Richard Thompson) –3:24
2. "Who Knows Where the Time Goes" (Sandy Denny) –5:08
3. "Walk Awhile" (Richard Thompson, Dave Swarbrick) –3:57
4. "Come All Ye" (Sandy Denny, Ashley Hutchings) –4:55
5. "Listen, Listen" (Sandy Denny) –3:56

Side two

1. "Bridge Over the River Ash" (trad. arr. Fairport Convention) –2:10
2. "I'll Keep It with Mine" (Bob Dylan) –5:50
3. "My Girl the Month of May" (Dion DiMucci) –2:12
4. "Million Dollar Bash" (Bob Dylan) –2:55
5. "The Way I Feel" (Gordon Lightfoot) –4:44
6. "Learning the Game" (Buddy Holly) –2:05

Side three

1. "Meet on the Ledge" (Richard Thompson) –2:29
2. "Percy's Song" (Bob Dylan) –7:52
3. "Now Be Thankful" (Richard Thompson, Dave Swarbrick) –2:22
4. "Tam Lin" (trad. arr. Fairport Convention) –7:20

Side four

1. "Genesis Hall" (Richard Thompson) –3:37
2. "Fotheringay" (Sandy Denny) –3:03
3. "Sloth" (Richard Thompson, Dave Swarbrick) –9:19
4. "Farewell, Farewell" (Richard Thompson) –2:38
5. "End of a Holiday" (Simon Nicol) –1:06

== Personnel ==
- Richard Thompson: lead guitar (Side One, all tracks; Side Two, tracks 2, 3, 4, & 6; Side Three, all tracks; Side Four, tracks 1–4), vocals (Side One, track 3 & 4; Side Two, tracks 3 & 4; Side Three, tracks 1–3; Side Four, track 3), mandolin (Side One, track 5; Side two, track 4, Side Three, track 2)
- Simon Nicol: guitar (Side One, tracks 1–4; Side two, tracks 2 & 4; Side Three, all tracks; Side Four, all tracks), dulcimer (Side Three, track 2), viola (Side two, track 1), vocals (Side One, tracks 3 & 4; Side Two, track 4; Side Three, tracks 1–3; Side Four, track 3)
- Sandy Denny: vocals (Side One, tracks 1, 2, 4, 5; Side Two, tracks 2–5; Side Three, tracks 1, 2, 4; Side Four, tracks 1, 2, 4), guitar (Side One, tracks 2 & 5; Side Three, track 1; Side Four, track 1), piano (Side Two, track 2)
- Iain Matthews: vocals (Side One, track 1; Side Two, track 2; Side Three, tracks 1 & 2)
- Ashley Hutchings: bass guitar (Side One, tracks 1, 2, 4; Side Two, tracks 2 & 4; Side Three, tracks 1, 2, 4; Side Four, tracks 1 & 4), vocals (Side Two, track 3)
- Dave Pegg: bass guitar (Side One, track 3; Side Three, track 3; Side Four, track 3), violin (Side two, track 1)
- Martin Lamble: drums (Side One, tracks 1 & 2; Side Two, tracks 2 & 4; Side Three, tracks 1 & 2; Side Four, tracks 1 & 4)
- Dave Mattacks: drums (Side One, tracks 3 & 4; Side Two, tracks 1, 3, 6; Side Three, tracks 3 & 4; Side Four, tracks 3 & 4), bass guitar (Side Two, track 1)
- Dave Swarbrick: violin (Side One, tracks 3–5; Side Two, track 1; Side Three, tracks 3 & 4; Side Four, tracks, 3 & 4), vocals (Side One, track 3; Side Three, track 3; Side Four, track 3)
- Trevor Lucas: guitar (Side Two, track 5), vocals (Side Two, tracks 3, 5, 6)
- Jerry Donahue: lead guitar (Side Two, track 5)
- Gerry Conway: drums (Side Two, track 3, 5, 6)
- Pat Donaldson: bass guitar (Side One, track 5; Side Two, tracks 3, 5, 6)
- Linda Thompson: vocals (Side One, track 5; Side Two, tracks 3 & 6)
- Tony Cox: piano (Side Two, tracks 3 & 6)
- Ian Whiteman: piano (Side Two, tracks 3 & 6)
- John Bundrick: keyboards (Side One, track 5)
- Timi Donald: drums (Side One, track 5)
