= English folk music (1970–1979) =

Music genre

== Births and deaths ==
=== Births ===
- Kate Rusby (1974)
- Sean Lennon (1975)
- Eliza Carthy (1975)

=== Deaths ===
- Harry Cox (1885–1971)
- Lewis 'Scan' Tester (1886–1972)
- Sandy Denny (1947–1978)

== Recordings ==
- 1970: Full House (Fairport Convention)
- 1970: Hark! The Village Wait (Steeleye Span)
- 1970: The Sweet Primeroses (Shirley Collins)
- 1970: Please to See the King (Steeleye Span)
- 1971: Land Fall (Martin Carthy)
- 1971: No Roses (Shirley Collins)
- 1971: Angel Delight (Fairport Convention)
- 1971: Babbacombe Lee (Fairport Convention)
- 1971: Bless the Weather John Martyn
- 1972: History of Fairport Convention (Fairport Convention)
- 1972: Ten Man Mop, or Mr. Reservoir Butler Rides Again (Steeleye Span)
- 1972: Below the Salt (Steeleye Span)
- 1972: Soldier (Harvey Andrews)
- 1972: Writer of Songs (Harvey Andrews)
- 1973: Rosie (Fairport Convention)
- 1973: Nine (Fairport Convention)
- 1973: Parcel of Rogues (Steeleye Span)
- 1973: Battle of the Field (Albion Country Band)
- 1973: Friends of Mine (Harvey Andrews)
- 1974: When the Frost is on the Pumpkin (Fred Jordan)
- 1974: Fairport Live Convention (Fairport Convention)
- 1974: Now We Are Six (Steeleye Span)
- 1975: Rising for the Moon (Fairport Convention)
- 1975: Commoners Crown (Steeleye Span)
- 1975: All Around My Hat (Steeleye Span)
- 1976: Gottle O'Geer (Fairport Convention)
- 1976: Swarbrick (Dave Swarbrick)
- 1976: Airs and Graces (June Tabor)
- 1976: Silly Sisters (Maddy Prior and June Tabor)
- 1976: Rocket Cottage (Steeleye Span)
- 1977: John Otway & Wild Willy Barrett (John Otway & Wild Willy Barrett)
- 1977: The Prospect Before Us (Albion Country Band)
- 1977: Live at the L.A. Troubadour (Fairport Convention)
- 1977: The Bonny Bunch of Roses (Fairport Convention)
- 1977: Storm Force Ten (Steeleye Span)
- 1978: Tipplers Tales (Fairport Convention)
- 1979: Farewell Farewell (Fairport Convention)

== See also ==
- Music of the United Kingdom (1970s)
