= Fotheringay 2 =

Studio album by Fotheringay
- Released: 30 September 2008
- Recorded: November – December 1970; 2008
- Genre: Folk rock
- Label: Fledg'ling Records
- Producer: Jerry Donahue

Professional ratings
Review scores
Source	Rating
Allmusic	3.5/5 stars

Fotheringay 2 is the second and final album by the group formed by Sandy Denny after she left Fairport Convention in 1969. The band was short-lived, and broke up in 1971 after only a small number of tracks for this album had been completed, some of which then subsequently appeared on other compilations. The remainder were assembled (posthumously in the cases of Denny and Trevor Lucas), with additional studio recording as needed, from masters in various states of completeness by Jerry Donahue and finally released in 2008. Two songs originally worked on for this album ("John the Gun" and "Late November") were re-recorded and appeared on the first solo Denny album The North Star Grassman and the Ravens in 1971, with the latter featuring all Fotheringay members. Live versions of others had previously been known to collectors from recordings of BBC radio broadcasts and live concerts, as subsequently compiled on the 2015 release Nothing More: The Collected Fotheringay. The two Trevor Lucas/Peter Roche originals would later be recorded for Fairport Convention albums after Lucas and lead guitarist Jerry Donahue joined the group. Knights of the Road appeared on Rosie in 1973, also featuring Fotheringay drummer Gerry Conway, and Restless on Rising for the Moon in 1975 by which time Denny had also briefly rejoined the group. Denny would re-record "Silver Threads and Golden Needles" for her final album Rendezvous released in 1977.

== Track listing ==
All tracks credited to Trad. arr. Fotheringay except where noted.

1. "John the Gun" (Sandy Denny) – 5.07
2. "Eppie Moray" – 4.45
3. "Wild Mountain Thyme" – 3.51
4. "Knights of the Road" (Trevor Lucas, Pete Roach) – 4.10
5. "Late November" (Sandy Denny) – 4.40
6. "Restless" (Trevor Lucas, Pete Roach) – 2.48
7. "Gypsy Davey" – 3.42
8. "I Don't Believe You" (Bob Dylan) – 4.45
9. "Silver Threads and Golden Needles" (Dick Reynolds, Jack Rhodes) – 4.30
10. "Bold Jack Donahue" – 7.38
11. "Two Weeks Last Summer" (Dave Cousins) – 3.51

== Personnel ==
Fotheringay

- Sandy Denny – guitar, piano, vocals
- Trevor Lucas – guitar, vocals
- Jerry Donahue – guitar, vocals
- Pat Donaldson – bass, vocals
- Gerry Conway – drums

with:

- Sam Donahue – saxophone
- Wendy Righart Van Gelder – backing vocals
- John "Rabbit" Bundrick – organ

== Production ==
- Producer: Jerry Donahue
- Engineers: John Wood, Jerry Boys, Scott Whitley, Henno Althoff, Justin Fox, Richard Barron, Jerry Donahue
- Mastering: Ben Wiseman
- Art direction: David Suff, Phil Smee
- Photography: n/a
- Liner notes: Richard Williams
