= Fotheringay (album) =

Studio album by Fotheringay
- Released: June 1970
- Recorded: February – April 1970
- Studio: Sound Techniques (London)
- Genre: Folk, folk rock
- Length: 40:03
- Label: Island ILPS9125 (UK); A&M SP4269 (USA); Fledg'ling (2005 reissue)
- Producer: Joe Boyd

Sandy Denny chronology
Liege & Lief (1969)	Fotheringay (1970)	It's Sandy Denny (1970)

Singles from Fotheringay
- 1. "Peace in the End" / "Winter Winds" Released: 1970, Island WIP 6085; 2. "The Way I Feel" Released: 1971, A&M Records (Canada) AMX 311 W

Professional ratings
Review scores
Source	Rating
AllMusic	4/5 stars

Fotheringay is an album by Fotheringay. The group was formed by Sandy Denny after she left Fairport Convention in 1969. The album is the group's only contemporaneous release. It was recorded in 1970 with former Eclection member and Denny's future husband Trevor Lucas, with Gerry Conway, Jerry Donahue, and Pat Donaldson. The album includes five Sandy Denny compositions (one of which was co-written with Lucas), one song by Lucas, as well as one traditional song and two cover versions: Bob Dylan's "Too Much of Nothing" and Gordon Lightfoot's "The Way I Feel".

== Track listing ==
Side one
No.	Title	Writer(s)	Length
1.	"Nothing More"	Sandy Denny	4:37
2.	"The Sea"	Denny	5:32
3.	"The Ballad of Ned Kelly"	Trevor Lucas	3:34
4.	"Winter Winds"	Denny	2:13
5.	"Peace in the End"	Denny, Lucas	4:02

Side two
No.	Title	Writer(s)	Length
6.	"The Way I Feel"	Gordon Lightfoot	4:46
7.	"The Pond and the Stream"	Denny	3:20
8.	"Too Much of Nothing"	Bob Dylan	3:55
9.	"Banks of the Nile"	Traditional	8:04
Total length:			40:03

Hannibal CD reissue bonus tracks
No.	Title	Writer(s)	Length
10.	"Two Weeks Last Summer" (live at the Holland Pop Festival, Rotterdam, 28 June 1970)	Dave Cousins
11.	"Gypsy Davey"	Traditional; arranged by Denny	3:52

Fledg'ling Records re-issue bonus tracks
No.	Title	Writer(s)	Length
10.	"Two Weeks Last Summer" (live at the Holland Pop Festival, Rotterdam, 28 June 1970)	Dave Cousins
11.	"Nothing More" (live at the Holland Pop Festival, Rotterdam, 28 June 1970)	Denny
12.	"Banks of the Nile" (live at the Holland Pop Festival, Rotterdam, 28 June 1970)	Traditional
13.	"Memphis Tennessee" (live at the Holland Pop Festival, Rotterdam, 28 June 1970)	Chuck Berry

== Personnel ==
Fotheringay

- Sandy Denny – guitar, piano, vocals
- Trevor Lucas – guitar, vocals
- Jerry Donahue – lead guitar, vocals
- Pat Donaldson – bass, vocals
- Gerry Conway – drums
- Linda Pettifer – vocals
- Todd Lloyd – vocals

== Production ==
- Producer: Joe Boyd
- Recording engineer: Jerry Boys, Todd Lloyd
- Art direction: cover illustrations by Marion Appleton
- Photography: gatefold image by Tony Evans
- Liner notes: n/a
