= If You Saw Thro' My Eyes =

Studio album by Ian Matthews
- Released: May 1971
- Recorded: 1970
- Studio: Morgan, London
- Genre: Folk rock
- Length: 39:18
- Label: Vertigo
- Producer: Ian Matthews

Ian Matthews chronology
Later That Same Year (1970)	If You Saw Thro' My Eyes (1971)	Tigers Will Survive (1972)

Professional ratings
Review scores
Source	Rating
AllMusic	4.5/5 stars
Dusted	(favorable)

If You Saw Thro' My Eyes is the 1971 album by country rock/folk rock musician Ian Matthews. It was the first of two Ian Matthews solo albums released on Vertigo, a subsidiary label of Philips/Phonogram (the second being Tigers Will Survive released in 1972). Guest musicians were former Fairport Convention bandmates Sandy Denny on vocals and keyboards, and Richard Thompson on accordion and guitar. The album also featured guitarist Tim Renwick, jazz pianist Keith Tippett and Matthews' future bandmate in Plainsong, Andy Roberts.

The second track on the album, ‘Hearts’, was released as a single on April 23, 1971; the album itself (catalogue number VEL-1002) was released worldwide on May 1 that year.

If You Saw Thro' My Eyes remained unavailable on CD until 1993 when it was released as a 2-on-1 reissue on Vertigo coupled with Tigers Will Survive. The original album on its own was remastered and reissued on CD in 2003 on MK2 Records. It has since been reissued again several times, the most recent version being in 2012 on Esoteric Records.

A live version of the album, If You Saw Thro' My Eyes - Live, recorded in October 2003 at Cambrinus Cafe in Horst, The Netherlands (where Matthews now lives), was released as the second CD of the 2-CD set Sparkler: The Best of the Texas Recordings 1989-2004 on the Blue Rose record label.

== Track listing ==
(All tracks composed by Ian Matthews except where noted)

1. "Desert Inn" – 3:29
2. "Hearts" – 3:01
3. "Never Ending" – 2:52
4. "Reno Nevada" (Richard Fariña) – 4:47
5. "Little Known" – 2:50
6. "Hinge I" – 1:20
7. "Hinge II" – 1:10
8. "Southern Wind" – 3:10
9. "It Came Without Warning" (Jerry Burnham, Allan Jacobs) – 3:45
10. "You Couldn't Lose" – 3:35
11. "Morgan the Pirate" (Fariña) – 6:42
12. "Thro' My Eyes" – 2:37

== Charts ==
Chart (1971)	Peak position
Australia (Kent Music Report)	31

== Personnel ==
- Ian Matthews - guitar, vocals
- Sandy Denny - piano, harmonium, vocals
- Richard Thompson - electric and acoustic guitar, accordion
- Pat Donaldson - bass
- Andy Roberts - acoustic guitar
- Tim Renwick - electric and acoustic guitar
- Gerry Conway - drums
- Keith Tippett - piano on "Never Ending" and "Southern Wind"
- Doris Troy, Liza Strike and Nanette Workman - backing vocals on "Southern Wind"

Production

- Producer: Ian Matthews
- Recording Engineer: Robin Black at Morgan Studios, London
- Art Direction: Design Machine
- Photography: Steve Hiett
