= Trevor Lucas =

Australian folk singer (1943–1989)

- Trevor Lucas, Wilsons Promontory, 1985

Background information
- Also known as: Ferrari McLintock, Bluey
- Born: Trevor George Lucas; 25 December 1943; Epworth Hospital, Richmond, Victoria, Australia
- Origin: Melbourne, Victoria, Australia
- Died: 4 February 1989 (aged 45) Sydney, New South Wales, Australia
- Genres: Folk; British folk rock
- Occupations: Singer; songwriter; musician
- Instruments: Vocals; guitar; harmonica; bass
- Years active: 1961–1989
- Labels: EAST; Reality; Elektra; Island
- Formerly of: Eclection; Fotheringay; Sandy Denny; Fairport Convention; Bluey and Curly
- Website: mainlynorfolk.info/trevor.lucas

Trevor George Lucas (25 December 1943 – 4 February 1989) was an Australian folk singer, a member of Fairport Convention and one of the founders of Fotheringay. He mainly worked as a singer-songwriter and guitarist but also produced many albums and composed for the film industry toward the end of his career. He married three times, his first wife was Cheryl (1964 – ca. 1969), his second wife was fellow folk musician Sandy Denny (1973–1978), and his third wife was Elizabeth Hurtt (1979–1989). Lucas died on 4 February 1989 of a heart attack in his sleep, in Sydney, aged 45. According to Australian rock music historian Ian McFarlane, Lucas "was one of the most acclaimed singer-songwriters Australia ever produced and although he was held in high regard in UK folk rock circles, he remained virtually unknown in his homeland".

== Biography ==
=== Early years to Eclection ===
Trevor George Lucas was born on 25 December 1943 at Epworth Hospital, Richmond, Victoria. He learned to play guitar in order to help with his dyslexia. On leaving school, Lucas took up an apprenticeship as a carpenter during the day, while performing nights at local clubs in Melbourne from 1961 or 1962. By the time he completed his apprenticeship in 1963 his musical career was established and he never worked as a carpenter. In 1963 he performed at the Emerald Hill concerts. Fellow folk musician Garry Kinnane described Lucas as

always a compelling performer to watch, with his flaming red hair and beard, and his tall, lean, angular frame towering over most other performers. He had a deep, rich pleasant voice, which he adapted well to blues, work-songs, shanties and bush ballads, shifting his accent around from 'black' American to 'Outback Oz', without ever sounding like anybody but himself. His guitar playing was ... a knowledgeable left-hand for blues, and some good right-hand picking which he eventually did using metal finger-picks ... [he] had a fierce, driving flat-picking style when playing 12-string guitar ... after the manner of Leadbelly. He also played a harmonica in a harness, a la Bob Dylan

— Garry Kinnane, "Trevor Lucas", Traynors Folk and Jazz Club, July 2009.

He released his first solo work in Australia, two tracks, "Old Time Religion" and "Dem Bones Gwine to Rise Again", on the Various Artists' extended play The Folk Attick Presents (1963). In mid-1964 he married his first wife, Cheryl. In late 1964 Lucas released a solo album, See That My Grave Is Kept Clean on EAST Records. He also appeared on a compilation album called "Australian Folk Festival", which was recorded in August that year with other folk musicians, Tina Lawton, Paul Marks, Brian Mooney, Lenore Somerset and Martyn Wyndham-Read.

On New Year's Eve 1964 Lucas boarded the Greek ship, RHMS Ellinis, and relocated to the United Kingdom with Cheryl. In London he worked as a solo artist and accompanist at various folk clubs including The Troubadour. He performed at the International Folk Fest at Royal Albert Hall. Lucas released his second solo album, Overlander (1966), on Reality Records, and performed "Tinkers Song" and "I Sowed the Seeds of Love" on the soundtrack album of the 1967 film Far from the Madding Crowd. In August 1967 Lucas, playing bass guitar, formed the folk band Eclection with fellow Australian Kerrilee Male on lead vocals, Georg Kajanus (as George Hultgreen) on guitar and lead vocals, Michael Rosen on guitar and lead vocals, and Gerry Conway on drums. In August 1968 they issued a self-titled album and continued until their breakup in October 1969. Lucas recalled the group, "a very underground, flower power group, based on a cross between the Jefferson Airplane and the Mamas and the Papas [it was] a good apprenticeship in electric music. I don't think it created anything devastatingly good ... We were all very naive ... We got ripped off terribly".

=== Fotheringay and Fairport Convention ===
By May 1969 Lucas was dating Sandy Denny, lead singer of Fairport Convention, when he played triangle in Si Tu Dois Partir on their album Unhalfbricking (July 1969). In late 1969 Lucas, Denny and Conway formed Fotheringay after Denny left Fairport Convention – other members included Pat Donaldson on bass guitar and Jerry Donahue on guitar and vocals. In June 1970 Fotheringay released a self-titled album where Lucas provided acoustic guitar and vocals. The album included the Lucas-penned track, "The Ballad of Ned Kelly" (aka "Poor Ned") and "Peace in the End" co-written with Denny. Allmusic's Dave Thompson was not impressed by Lucas' vocals, "great guitarist though he was, his voice offers nothing that you could not hear in any amateur folk club, any night of the week, rendering Dylan's 'Too Much of Nothing', Gordon Lightfoot's 'The Way I Feel', and his own 'Ballad of Ned Kelly' little more than makeweights". Whereas Nick Talevski in Knocking on Heaven's Door: Rock Obituaries (2006), found "The Ballad of Ned Kelly" to be a highlight of the album.

The band broke up in 1971 with Denny undertaking a solo career with backing from Lucas. A follow-up album had been recorded in November to December 1970 but it was abandoned until 2007, when it was finally completed by Donahue and released in September 2008 as Fotheringay 2. Lucas felt his time with Fotheringay was the most enjoyable of his music career, the band members were "being more creative, more expressive". From 1969 to 1972 Lucas focused on sound engineering and record production. During that time he worked with various groups and former members of Fotheringay. In 1972, Lucas organised and produced a one-off album, Rock On by "The Bunch," which featured 12 classic oldies favourites performed by past and (then) present members of Fairport Convention, as well other friends. He became a session musician and record producer for Bronco, Julie Covington, Al Stewart, The Strawbs and Richard & Linda Thompson.

During July and August 1972 Lucas helped Fairport Convention record their album Rosie (February 1973) and brought Jerry Donahue in for several tracks. Subsequently he and Donahue joined the group. On 20 September 1973 Lucas and Denny married and shortly thereafter Denny rejoined Fairport Convention. In late 1975 Fairport started a long promotional tour and shortly afterwards Lucas, Denny and Donahue left the band. Lucas and Denny left because "[w]e'd spent eight months on the road touring, and we'd been thinking of having a family and all that sort of thing". Lucas assisted on Denny's further solo work. In the mid-1970s the couple relocated to the village of Byfield in Northamptonshire, in July 1977 Denny gave birth to their only child, a daughter, Georgia Rose Lucas.

=== Later years ===
Sandy Denny had suffered from substance abuse problems for some time, and by 1977 her addictions were obvious to others. Linda Thompson told The Guardian that shortly after the birth of their daughter Georgia in July 1977, Denny "was crashing the car and leaving the baby in the pub and all sorts of stuff." Thompson also noted that the child was born prematurely, yet Denny seemed to have little concern for her new baby.

In late March 1978, while on holiday with her parents and baby Georgia in Cornwall, Denny was injured when she fell down a staircase and hit her head on concrete. Following the incident, she suffered from intense headaches; a doctor prescribed her the painkiller Distalgesic, a drug known to have fatal side effects when mixed with alcohol. On 13 April, concerned with his wife's erratic behaviour and fearing for his daughter's safety, Trevor Lucas left the UK and returned to his native Australia with their child. Four days later, Denny collapsed and fell into a coma while at a friend's home. Lucas returned immediately to London, leaving Georgia in the care of his parents. On 21 April, Denny died at Atkinson Morley Hospital in Wimbledon. Her death was ruled to be the result of a traumatic mid-brain haemorrhage and blunt force trauma to her head.

Lucas returned to Melbourne in August. "It seemed like a good refuge ... I've got a lot of family here, and I thought it was important for Georgia, my 13-month-old daughter, to have that sort of security".

Lucas settled permanently in Australia after 1978. From 1979 and into the 1980s, Lucas was producing albums for Australian artists and later started working on scores for the film industry. He also married Elizabeth Hurtt, his third wife, and they had a son, Clancy.

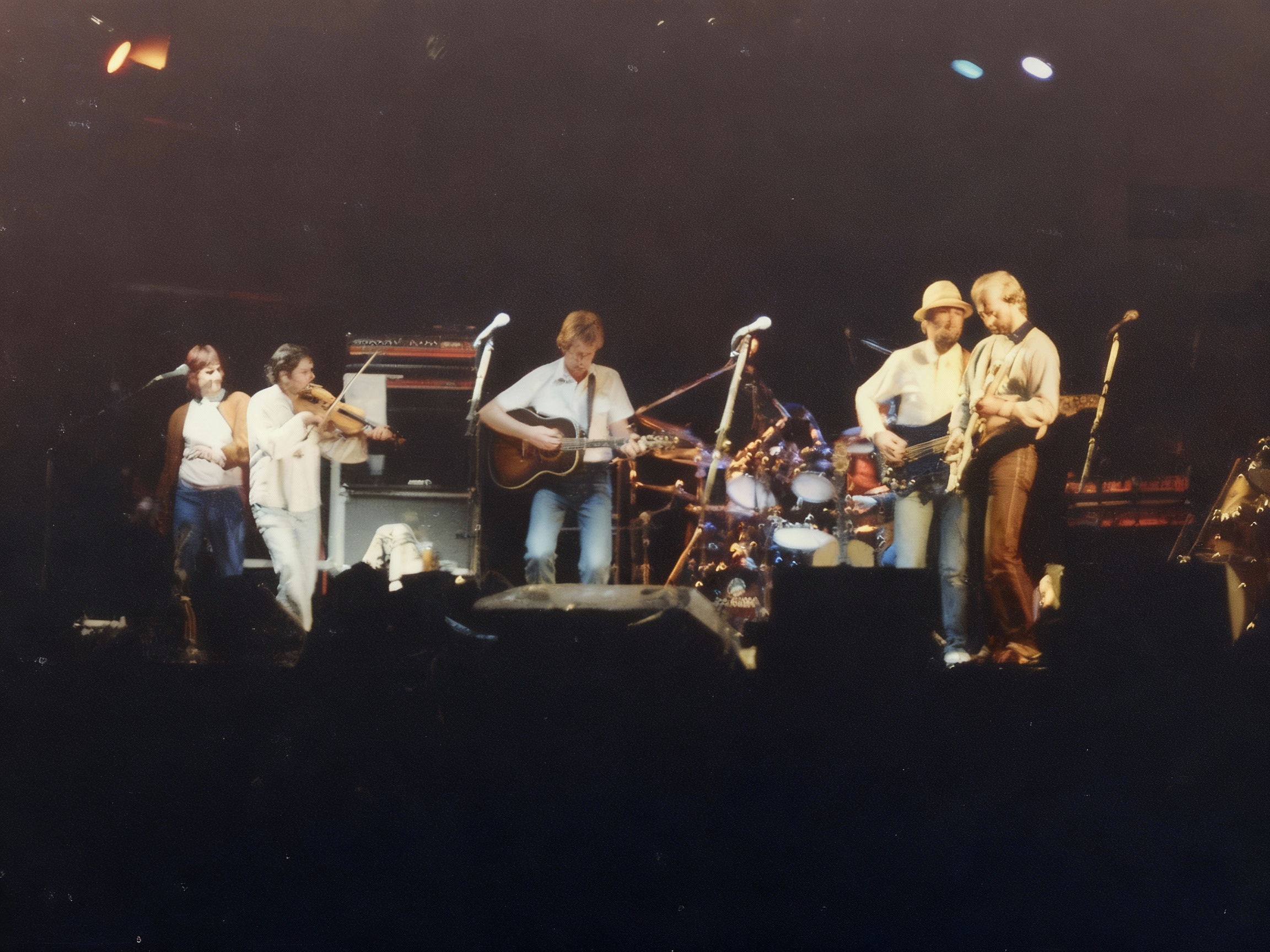
Trevor Lucas (middle) performing as part of Fairport Convention in 1982

Lucas's Australian production credits include the number-two hit single, "Solid Rock", by Goanna and its related number-two album, Spirit of Place (November 1982); and number-one hit, "I Was Only 19", by Redgum and their albums, Caught in the Act (June 1983) and Frontline (August 1984). His film score work began with forming Andromeda Productions which provided documentaries and children's dramas. In 1985 he briefly returned to England to work on a compilation album as a tribute to Denny, Who Knows Where the Time Goes? In August that year, he performed with an extended Fairport Convention line-up at the Cropredy Festival.

Back in Australia Lucas produced Wayne Gillespie's New Locations album for CBS NZ at Byron Bay's Music Farm (January 1986), co-composed film soundtracks with Ian Mason including for Jenny Kissed Me (1986) and Slate Wyn and Me (1987). For the 1986 horror-thriller feature film, Cassandra, which Lucas produced, he and Mason composed the score and the song, "Land of the Free" and performed it as Bluey and Curly. By 1987 Lucas and his family were living in Epping, New South Wales. With John Penhallow, briefly Fairport Convention's first manager, he assembled a cassette tape, Attic Tracks for private sale. After his death Penhallow and Hurtt compiled a further three tapes, which became volumes 2-4 of the Attic Track series.

On 4 February 1989, Trevor Lucas died of a heart attack in his sleep, in Sydney, aged 45 years old. Elizabeth Hurtt, Georgia and Clancy remained in Sydney. Elizabeth Hurtt became the administrator of the estates of both Denny and Lucas. According to Australia rock music historian Ian McFarlane, Lucas "was one of the most acclaimed singer/songwriters Australia ever produced and although he was held in high regard in UK folk-rock circles, he remained virtually unknown in his homeland".

== Discography ==
Listed chronologically

Produced by Trevor Lucas: ~
Produced and performed by Trevor Lucas: ~~

=== Albums ===
Trevor Lucas

- See That My Grave Is Kept Clean (1964)
- Overlander (1966)

Eclection

- Eclection (1968)

Fairport Convention

- Unhalfbricking (1969)
- The History of Fairport Convention (compilation) (1972)
- Rosie (1973) ~~
- Nine (1973) ~~
- Fairport Live Convention (1974) ~~
- Rising for the Moon (1975)
- Tour Sampler (promotional compilation) (1975)
- The Airing Cupboard Tapes (1981)
- A Peculiar Old Weekend (video) (1982)
- Folk with Poke – (compilation) (1983)
- A.T. 2 (1983)

Fotheringay

- Fotheringay (1970)
- Fotheringay 2 (2008)
- Fotheringay Essen 1970 (2011)

Sandy Denny

- The North Star Grassman and the Ravens (1971)
- Sandy (1972) ~
- Like an Old Fashioned Waltz (1974) ~~
- Rendezvous (1977) ~

Other artists

- "Bert" Lloyd Leviathan (1967)
- Richard Rodney Bennett Far from the Madding Crowd (soundtrack) (1967)
- Judy Collins In My Life (1968)
- Paul McNeill Traditionally at the Troubadour (1968)
- A. L. "Bert" Lloyd, Alf Edwards, Dave Swarbrick, Martin Carthy, Martyn Wyndham-Read and Trevor Lucas: Folkloric Recording (1968)
- Stefan Grossman, The Ragtime Cowboy Jew (1970)
- Al Stewart, Zero She Flies (1970)
- Various Artists, Bumpers (compilation) (1970)
- Bronco, Ace of Sunlight (1971)
- Luther Grosvenor, Under Open Skies (1971)
- A.L. Lloyd, Martyn Wyndham-Read, Trevor Lucas, The Great Australian Legend (1971)
- Various Artists, El Pea (compilation) (1971)
- The Bunch, Rock On (1972) ~~
- Stefan Grossman Hot Dogs (1972)
- Strawbs Grave New World (1972)
- Brian Maxine Ribbon of Stainless Steel (1974)
- Richard & Linda Thompson I Want to See the Bright Lights Tonight (1974)
- Various Artists The Electric Muse (1975)
- Various Artists Island June–July 1975 New Release (1975)
- Richard Thompson Live! More or Less (compilation) (1977)
- Julie Covington Julie Covington (1978)
- Richard Thompson First Light (1978)
- Dave Warner's from the Suburbs Mug's Game (1978)
- 33° South The Tourists (1979) ~
- The Bushwackers Dance Album (1980) ~~
- The Bushwackers Faces in the Street (1981) ~~
- Paul Kelly & The Dots, Talk (1981) ~
- Goanna Spirit of Place (1982) ~
- Redgum Caught in the Act (1983) ~
- Jan Wositzky A Fruitcake of Australian Stories (1983) ~
- Various Artists Into the Past with the Future (promotional compilation)
- Bahloo Living on an Island (1984) ~~
- Goanna Oceania (1984) ~
- Redgum Frontline (1984) ~
- Norman Gunston Join the Dots (1984) ~~ (performed and produced under pseudonym: Ferrari McLintock)
- Wayne Gillespie "New Locations" (1986) ~~

=== Extended plays ===
- Various Artists The Folk Attick Presents (1963)

=== Singles ===
Trevor Lucas

- "Waltzing Matilda" / "It's On" (1966)

Eclection

- "Nevertheless" / "Mark Time" (1968)
- "Another Time Another Place" / "Betty Brown" (1968)
- "Please" / "St. George & the Dragon" (1968)
- "Please Mk2" / "In the Early Days" (1968)
- "Nevertheless" / "Another Time Another Place" (1971)
- "Nevertheless" / "Please" (1976)

Fairport Convention

- "Si Tu Dois Partir" / "Genesis Hall" (1969)
- "Rosie" / "Knights of the Road" (1973) ~~
- "Rosie" / "Fiddlestix" (1973) ~~
- "The Devil in the Kitchen" / "Possibly Parsons Green" (1974) ~~
- "White Dress" / "Tears" (1975)

Fotheringay

- "Peace in the End" / "Winter Winds" (1970)

Sandy Denny

- "Listen, Listen" / "Tomorrow is a Long Time" (1972) ~
- "Whispering Grass" / "Friends" (1973) ~~
- "Candle in the Wind" / "Still Waters Run Deep" (1977) ~

Other artists

- Marc Ellington "Rains" / "Reins of Changes" (1971)
- The Bunch "When Will I Be Loved?" / "Willie and the Hand Jive" (1972) ~~
- Gerry Conway "Let There Be Drums" (1972) ~~
- Steve Ashley "Old Rock'n'Roll" / "Fire & Wine" (1974)
- Julie Covington "I Want to See the Bright Lights Tonight" / "A Little Bit More" (1978)
- Richard & Linda Thompson "Don't Let a Thief Steal into Your Heart" / "First Light" (1978)
- Dave Warner's from the Suburbs, "(We Got) Nothing to Lose" / "African Summer" (1978)
- 33° South "33° South" (1979) ~
- 33° South "This Time It's Love" (1979) ~
- The Bushwackers "Flying Pieman" / "Kangaroo Hop" (1980) ~
- Paul Kelly & The Dots "Billy Baxter" / "Hard Knocks" (1980) ~
- The Bushwackers "Les Darcy" / "Weevils in the Flour" (1981) ~~
- The Bushwackers "Marijuana Australiana" / "Ned Kelly's Tunes'" (1981) ~
- Goanna, "Solid Rock" / "Four Weeks Gone" (1982) ~
- Goanna "Razor's Edge" / "On the Platform"(1982) ~
- Gordon Franklin & The Wilderness Ensemble (Goanna) "Let the Franklin Flow" / "Franklin River" (1983) ~
- Redgum "I Was Only 19 (A Walk in the Light Green)" / "Yarralumla Wine" (1983) ~~
- Redgum "Caught in the Act" / "Stewie" / "Lear Jets Over Kulgera" (1983) ~
- Redgum "The Long Run (live)" / "Fabulon" (1983) ~
- Bahloo "Living on an Island" / "Funky Monkey Mia" (1984) ~
- Bahloo "Leave It in the Ground" / "Everyone Is Everyone" (1984) ~
- John Justin "It's Magic" / "Only Without You" (1984) ~
- Goanna "Common Ground" / "Oceania (instrumental)" (1984) ~

== Sources ==
- Humphries, Patrick (1982). Meet on the Ledge – a history of Fairport Convention. London: Eel Pie. ISBN 0-906008-46-8.
- Redwood, Fred; Woodward, Martin (1995). The Woodworm Era: The story of today's Fairport Convention. Thatcham: Jeneva. ISBN 0-9525860-0-2.
- Reinhard Zierke
