= Rock On (The Bunch album) =

Studio album by The Bunch
- Released: April 1972
- Recorded: December 1971 – January 1972
- Studio: The Manor (Shipton-on-Cherwell, England)
- Genre: Rock and Roll
- Label: Island (UK); A&M (US); Fledg'ling (CD reissue)
- Producer: Trevor Lucas

Singles from Rock On
- 1. "When Will I Be Loved?" b/w "Willie and the Hand Jive" Released: 1972; 2. "The Loco-Motion" b/w "Sweet Little Rock 'n' Roller" Released: 1972

Professional ratings
Review scores
Source	Rating
Allmusic	2/5 stars
Christgau's Record Guide	B+

Rock On is a 1972 one-off album of oldies covers by The Bunch, a group of English folk rock singers and musicians. The Bunch was put together by Trevor Lucas in late 1971 to record this sole album. This album consisted of covers of the band’s favourite songs by Elvis Presley, Buddy Holly, and The Everly Brothers, amongst others.

Among the Bunch were former and future members of Fairport Convention and others, including Sandy Denny, Richard Thompson, Linda Thompson (credited as Linda Peters), Pat Donaldson, Ashley Hutchings, Gerry Conway, and Dave Mattacks.

Fledg'ling Records reissued the album on compact disc in 2003, adding four bonus tracks. The album (including the bonus tracks) was re-issued again by Talking Elephant Records in 2013.

== Track listing ==
Original vinyl album:

1. "Crazy Arms"
2. "That'll Be the Day"
3. "Don't Be Cruel"
4. "The Loco-Motion"
5. "My Girl the Month of May"
6. "Love's Made a Fool of You"
7. "Willie and the Hand Jive"
8. "Jambalaya (On the Bayou)"
9. "When Will I Be Loved"
10. "Nadine"
11. "Sweet Little Rock 'n' Roller"
12. "Learning the Game"

Flexi-disc included with original LP:

1. "Let There Be Drums"

Fledg'ling Records FLED 3042 CD (bonus tracks):

13. "Let There Be Drums"
14. "Twenty Flight Rock"
15. "High School Confidential"
16. "La Bamba"

== Personnel ==
=== Musicians ===
- Sandy Denny – lead vocals (2,6,7,9,12), backing vocals (3–5,10,11,16)
- Linda Peters – lead vocals (4,9,16), backing vocals (2–7,10,11)
- Ashley Hutchings – vocals (10)
- Richard Thompson – lead vocals (1,5,7,8,11,15), backing vocals (2–7), lead guitar (1), guitar (2–16)
- Trevor Lucas – lead vocals (3,14), acoustic guitar (6), 12-string guitar (9)
- Tony Cox – piano (11)
- Ian Whiteman – piano (2–4,7,9–10,12,14–16)
- Pat Donaldson – bass (1–16), backing vocals (2–7,15)
- Dave Mattacks – drums (2–4,10,16), congas (7,12)
- Gerry Conway – drums (1,2,4–9,11–16)

=== The Dundee Horns ===
- Horn section:
  - Roger Ball – alto saxophone (1), baritone saxophone (2–4), saxophone (7,10–11,13–16), piano (8)
  - Mike Rosen – trumpet (1,7,11)
  - Molly Duncan – saxophone (1)
