= The Electric Revelators =

- Origin: Swansea, Wales
- Genres: Blues
- Years active: 2004 – present
- Labels: Independent
- Members: Jerry Donahue; Simon Gregory; Gordon Wride
- Past members: Colin Goldring; Luke Evans; Rhys Morgan; Lisa Pedrick; Rob Thomas; Terry Clarke
- Website: https://www.facebook.com/#!/groups/189716235771/

The Electric Revelators are a blues band, formed in Swansea 2004, Wales, added Jerry Donahue ex-member of Fairport Convention and Chris Rea Band to the line-up in 2011. Originally called The Revelators they added Electric to the name in 2009 when they toured with The Animals and David "Honeyboy" Edwards.

The band play an electric set of Chicago blues, Texas blues and British blues all with an indie twist.

Their acoustic set is a mix of original and standard Delta blues they have performed at UK and European Blues Festivals since 2004.

== Style and techniques ==
Feeling at home in the US as well as in the UK, Donahue musically draws from influences of both countries like Celtic music, rock, blues and country. Technically, Donahue mostly plays in fingerpicking or hybrid picking style with his right hand. However, his left hand technique made him famous among guitar players.

Technically Gregory's style of playing slide guitar is fingerpicking, and plays guitar on his lap, he plays acoustic guitar in normal position but once again he will use finger style playing. Gregory's harmonica style or better known as blues harp is strongly influenced by Chicago players such as Junior Wells and Little Walter.

Gordon Wride's guitar technique is reliant on a heavy rhythm to complement the intricate styles of Donahue and Gregory, he will use both plectrum and hybrid picking Wride's slide technique is quite robust in the style of Son House and Jack White (musician) vocal style and influence is based on the early delta blues singers such as Robert Johnson, Skip James etc. Wride was also trained bel canto style by an operatic teacher for many years.

== Headlined the acoustic stage, Great British R&B Festival, Colne, Lancashire, August 2011 ==
The Electric Revelators featuring Jerry Donahue, Gordon Wride and Simon Gregory headlined the Acoustic Stage Colne Blues Festival in August 2011, with the songs of Robert Johnson Show. This was a one off festival appearance, after a sell out UK tour in February 2011 celebrating the centenary birthday of Johnson.

== Theatre performance ==
On 23 August 2007 Gordon Wride & The Revelators, played a part in the stage play Free at Last – at Brangwyn Hall, Swansea. The show attracted a sell out crowd, with The First Minister for Wales, Rhodri Morgan, in attendance. The official brochure sets out the cast with some of the leading UK and world jazz and blues musicians including Tony Kofi, Victor Brox and Byron Wallen. The Revelators were given headline billing in the official cast list. The show was produced/directed by Gbubemi Amas.

== Background on current band members ==
Gordon Wride – vocal & rhythm guitar/dobro

Cwmgors Wales

Currently tour manager for many UK rock & blues artists in Portugal, these include Manfred Mann, The Animals, The Yardbirds, Slade and John Lees Barclay James Harvest. Guest presenter and helped with research for BBC Radio Wales 2004 True Blues Show and is the creator of internet magazine Slim's Blues.

Jerry Donahue – lead guitar

California USA

Ex-member of Fairport Convention, The Yardbirds and the Hellecasters and Chris Rea. electric guitar player with The Electric Revelators (acoustic duo) for The Robert Johnson Song Book Tours.

Simon Gregory – lapslide, harmonica and guitar

Walsall England

Original member of The Electric Revelators 2007.

== Former members ==
- Colin Goldring: 2010 Founder member of Pork Dukes and Gnidrolog, Colin Goldring has been involved with many sessions for Plant Life records and BBC sessions playing on over 100 released records.
- Rob Thomas, 2004 – 2007 harmonica player from Swansea.
- Lisa Pedrick, (2005) was S4C Factor Wow winner beating pop artist Duffy into second place.
- Terry Clarke played with The Revelators in 2006.

== Recordings ==
- How Cold Is The Valley: 4 Track EP (2006)
- Betrayal Blues: (2008)

== Reviews ==
The Electric Revelators are reviewed in issue 51 November 2009 of Blues Matters, first for their show with David "Honeyboy" Edwards and their set at Blues on the Farm, June 2009.

Modern Guitar magazine cited Gordon Wride the first musician to perform with a Dobro guitar at a major blues festival in Porto, at The 2007 Douro Blues Festival, Portugal. Gordon Wride was also reviewed by Tom Watson (Modern Guitar magazine) as giving the audience a taste of early delta blues. On the bill that weekend of June 2007 were Coco Montoya and Ray Minninett, there are at least two reviews in Modern Guitar magazine on Gordon Wride – last one with Chris Jagger in 2008 at The Douro Blues Festival.

== Endorsement ==
The Electric Revelators are the only current Welsh blues band to be endorsed by international string distributor Picato Strings, one notable endorsee is Ritchie Blackmore
