= Gerry Conway (musician) =

English folk and rock drummer/percussionist (1947–2024)

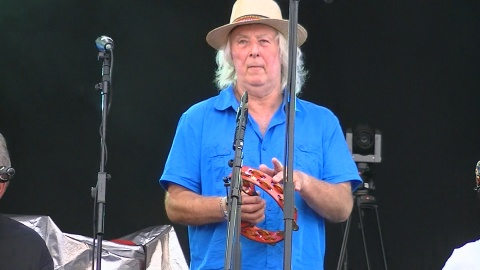
- Conway performing at Fairport's Cropredy Convention 2014

Background information
- Born: 11 September 1947; King's Lynn, Norfolk, England
- Died: 29 March 2024 (aged 76)
- Genres: Rock; folk rock; British folk rock; progressive rock
- Occupations: Musician; songwriter; record producer
- Instruments: Drums; percussion
- Years active: 1970–2024
- Labels: Island; Matty Grooves
- Formerly of: Jethro Tull; Fairport Convention; Pentangle; Fotheringay
- Spouse: Jacqui McShee

Gerald Conway (11 September 1947 – 29 March 2024) was an English rock drummer and percussionist. He performed with the backing band for Cat Stevens in the 1970s, with Jethro Tull during the 1980s, and was a member of Fairport Convention from 1998 to 2022. Conway also worked as a session musician. He was married to vocalist Jacqui McShee, the singer of the band Pentangle, of which he was also a member.

== Biography ==
=== Early life ===
Conway was born in King's Lynn, Norfolk, on 11 September 1947. He learned to play drums for school bands at secondary school in London. When he was 13, he was invited to join the Chico Arnéz Orchestra, but his parents decided he should not. He left school when he was sixteen and worked at EMI Records. He then became a member of one of the label's bands, playing Caribbean music. During 1964 he worked with Alexis Korner. In 1968 he joined the folk rock band Eclection with Trevor Lucas. He also worked with close friend Sandy Denny, of Fairport Convention, in the band Fotheringay.

=== Later career ===
In the 1970s he was the drummer for the band Fotheringay as well as for Eclection, other members of which included Kerrilee Male, Georg Kajanus [as George Hultgreen], Michael Rosen and Trevor Lucas. In their early years Steeleye Span also drafted in the services of Conway, who was a friend of the band. Conway played on their now-classic song "Dark-Eyed Sailor" and several others from their first album, Hark! The Village Wait (1970), which also featured contributions from Dave Mattacks, who Conway later replaced in Fairport. His studio works also include the debut solo albums of Sandy Denny, Iain Matthews and Shelagh McDonald, and appearances on albums by Wizz Jones, John Cale, Jim Capaldi and others. He was also one of the drummers on Whatever's for Us, the debut album of Joan Armatrading in 1972.

He toured and recorded as a member of Cat Stevens' band for six years and was a consistent member of the close knit backing band throughout the mid-1970s, including on the albums Teaser and the Firecat and Catch Bull at Four. When Stevens gave up his pop music career at the close of the decade, Conway performed on Daydo; the short-lived solo album of singer-songwriter Alun Davies, another long-term member of Stevens' band. During the 1980s, Conway also toured and recorded with Kate & Anna McGarrigle.

Conway joined Jethro Tull for their album The Broadsword and the Beast and also played on their Grammy Award-winning album Crest of a Knave.

Although he does not appear on any of his studio albums, Conway was a member of Richard Thompson's live band for several years in the 1980s, appearing on the tours for the albums Hand of Kindness, Across a Crowded Room and Daring Adventures. Some songs from these sessions appear on the compilations Watching the Dark and Live at the BBC.

Conway played drums in Fairport Convention from 1998 to 2022, taking over from Dave Mattacks and occasionally played for Pentangle. After 2006, Davies re-joined Stevens, now known as Yusuf Islam. Conway also played alongside Alun Davies in a side project called "Good Men in the Jungle", featuring Davies' daughter, Becky Moncurr.

Conway died on 29 March 2024, at the age of 76, having been diagnosed with motor neurone disease in 2022. Founding member of Fairport Convention, Simon Nicol, said of Conway: "Wonderfully patient and wise, infuriatingly tardy (!) but always ready and eager to play, and blessed with his own inner calm and solidity, I'm going to miss him more than I can say." Former Fairport member Iain Matthews said: "Gerry is gone and I don't know how I feel, except intensely sad. I knew him less than many [in the Fairport circle] but we went wayyy back. He played incredibly on my first solo album, If You Saw Thro' My Eyes... pure Gerry energy and spirit." Writing on his Facebook page, Yusuf/Cat Stevens said, "Sadly my great old drummer, Gerry Conway just passed away. What a lad, and what ingenuity and style. May God grant him the beautiful reward of peace everlasting."

== Discography ==
=== With Eclection ===
- Eclection (1968)

=== With Steeleye Span ===
- Hark! The Village Wait (1970)

=== With Fotheringay ===
- Fotheringay (1970)

=== With Al Stewart ===
- Zero She Flies (1970)

=== With Cat Stevens ===
- Teaser and the Firecat (1971)
- Catch Bull at Four (1972)
- Foreigner (1973)
- Buddha and the Chocolate Box (1974)
- Saturnight (1974)
- Numbers (1975)
- Back to Earth (1978)
- Majikat (2004)

=== With The Bunch ===
- Rock On (1972)

=== With Mike McGear ===
- Woman (1972)
- McGear (1974)

=== With GRIMMS ===
- Rockin' Duck (1973)

=== With Kate & Anna McGarrigle ===
- Entre la jeunesse et la sagesse (1980)

=== With Jethro Tull ===
- The Broadsword and the Beast (1982)
- Crest of a Knave (1987)

=== With Fairport Convention ===
- Rosie (1973) Appeared on three tracks
- The Wood and the Wire (1999)
- XXXV (2002)
- Over the Next Hill (2004)
- Sense of Occasion (2007)
- Festival Bell (2011)
- By Popular Request (2012)
- Myths and Heroes (2015)
- 50:50@50 (2017)
- Shuffle and Go (2020)

=== With Richard Thompson ===
- Watching the Dark (compilation, 1993)
- Faithless (recorded 1985, released 2004)
- Live at the BBC (recorded mid 80s, released 2011)
- Live at Rockpalast (recorded 1984, released 2017)
- Live at Rock City, Nottingham, November 1986 (released 2020)

=== With Iain Matthews ===
- If You Saw Thro' My Eyes (1971)
