= Rising for the Moon =

Studio album by Fairport Convention
- Released: June 1975
- Recorded: September 1974 and February–March 1975
- Studio: Olympic (London)
- Genre: Rock
- Length: 42:07
- Label: UK: Island
- Producer: Glyn Johns

Fairport Convention chronology
Fairport Live Convention (1974)	Rising for the Moon (1975)	Gottle O'Geer (1976)

Professional ratings
Review scores
Source	Rating
AllMusic	3/5 stars

Rising for the Moon is the tenth studio album by the British folk rock band Fairport Convention, released in 1975. It reached number 52 in the UK albums charts. This was the last Fairport album to feature vocalist Sandy Denny.

== Historical perspective ==
During this period, the band was dubbed by some fans—in a tongue-in-cheek manner—as "Fotheringay Convention" and "Fotheringport Confusion", as the core of Fotheringay (Denny, her husband Trevor Lucas, and Jerry Donahue) joined the remaining members of the early 1970s version of Fairport (Dave Pegg, Dave Mattacks and Dave Swarbrick) for this version of the band. Lucas, an Australian, and Donahue, an American, joined Pegg, Swarbrick, and drummer Mattacks in 1973 for the recording of the album Rosie. Denny travelled with the band while they toured in 1974 and began performing with them on stage.

This was the first Fairport Convention album not to involve John Wood in the production, and the only one not to feature any traditional material. With a number of solid songs penned, they entered the studio for recording sessions. Although still firmly rooted in the folk-rock vein, producer Glyn Johns brought a more polished and pop-influenced sound to the recording. Mattacks left midway through the sessions and was replaced by drummer Bruce Rowland.

This was the last Fairport record to reach the UK charts prior to Red & Gold in 1989; it entered the chart on 12 July 1975, and stayed just one week, reaching no. 52. The band (especially Denny) pinned their hopes on Rising For The Moon to finally be their breakthrough album; that level of popularity never materialized and, in December 1975, after touring in support of the album, Donahue left the band, followed shortly by Denny and Lucas. Carrying on as Fairport Convention, Pegg, Swarbrick and Rowland recruited several short-term replacements before persuading founder member Simon Nicol to return.

== Track listing ==
Side one
No.	Title	Writer(s)	Lead vocals	Length
1.	"Rising For The Moon"	Denny	Denny	4:08
2.	"Restless"	Lucas, Pete Roche	Lucas	4:00
3.	"White Dress"	Swarbrick	Denny	3:44
4.	"Let It Go"	Denny, Pegg, Swarbrick	Swarbrick	2:00
5.	"Stranger To Himself"	Denny	Denny	2:52
6.	"What Is True"	Denny	Denny	3:33

Side two
No.	Title	Writer(s)	Lead vocals	Length
7.	"Iron Lion"	Lucas	Lucas	3:28
8.	"Dawn"	Denny, Donahue	Denny	3:42
9.	"After Halloween"	Denny	Denny	3:38
10.	"Night-Time Girl"	Pegg, Swarbrick	Swarbrick	2:56
11.	"One More Chance"	Denny	Denny	7:52

=== Bonus reissue tracks ===
1. "Tears" (Lucas) – 4:09
2. "Rising for the Moon" (Denny) – 3:06
3. "Stranger to Himself" (Denny) – 2:17
4. "One More Chance" (Denny) – 3:46

== Personnel ==
Fairport Convention

- Sandy Denny – vocals, piano (1, 10), electric piano (3, 6, 9)
- Trevor Lucas – vocals, rhythm guitar (1–8, 10–11)
- Dave Swarbrick – vocals, violin (1–3, 7–8, 10–11), viola (3, 9), mandolin (3), dulcimer (5), autoharp (3), acoustic guitar (6, 9)
- Jerry Donahue – lead guitar
- Dave Pegg – bass, electric guitar (8), backing vocals (1–2, 7–8, 10)
- Dave Mattacks – drums (1–3, 8, 11)
- Bruce Rowland – drums (4–7, 9–10)
