= Holland Pop Festival =

1970 music festival in Rotterdam, the Netherlands

Holland Pop Festival (Kralingen Music Festival)
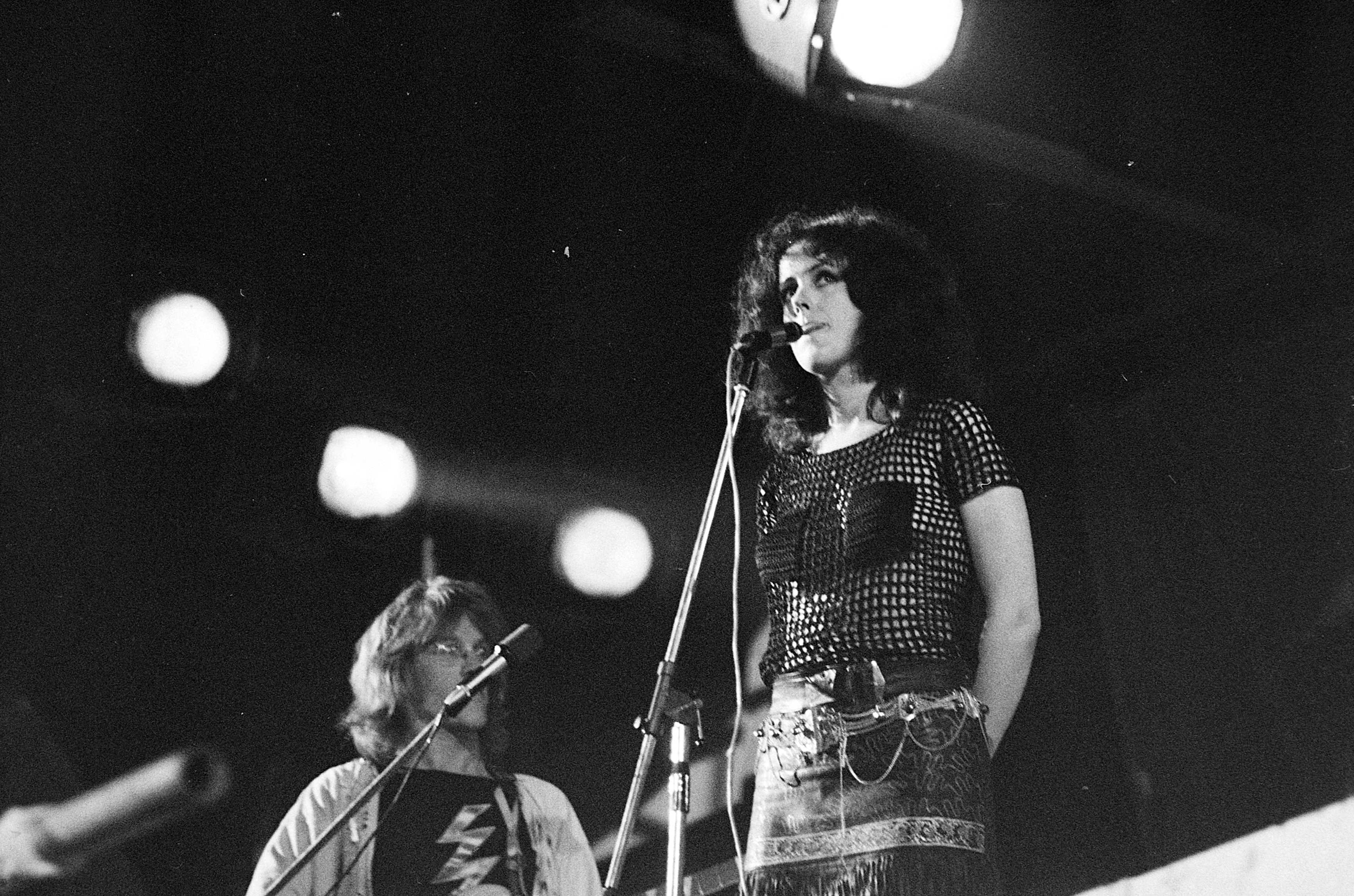
- Grace Slick (Jefferson Airplane) at Kralingen
- Genre: Rock, pop.
- Dates: 26–28 June 1970
- Locations: Rotterdam, Netherlands
- Years active: 1970
- Attendance: ~100,000

The Holland Pop Festival, also known as the Kralingen Music Festival, was a pop and rock music festival held in the Kralingse Bos, in the Kralingen neighbourhood of Rotterdam in the Netherlands, from 26 to 28 June 1970.

== History ==
Performing bands included The Byrds, T. Rex, Santana, Jefferson Airplane, and the headlining Pink Floyd. Approximately 100,000 attended. Festival posters show that the festival was billed in Dutch as Pop Paradijs and 'Holland Pop Festival 70', and that the main investor was Coca-Cola. In both English and Dutch, the festival is also known by the English name Stamping Ground, and is often billed as the European answer to Woodstock. It took place approximately one year after Woodstock, and two months before the third 1970 Isle of Wight Festival (the first two being held in 1968 and 1969).

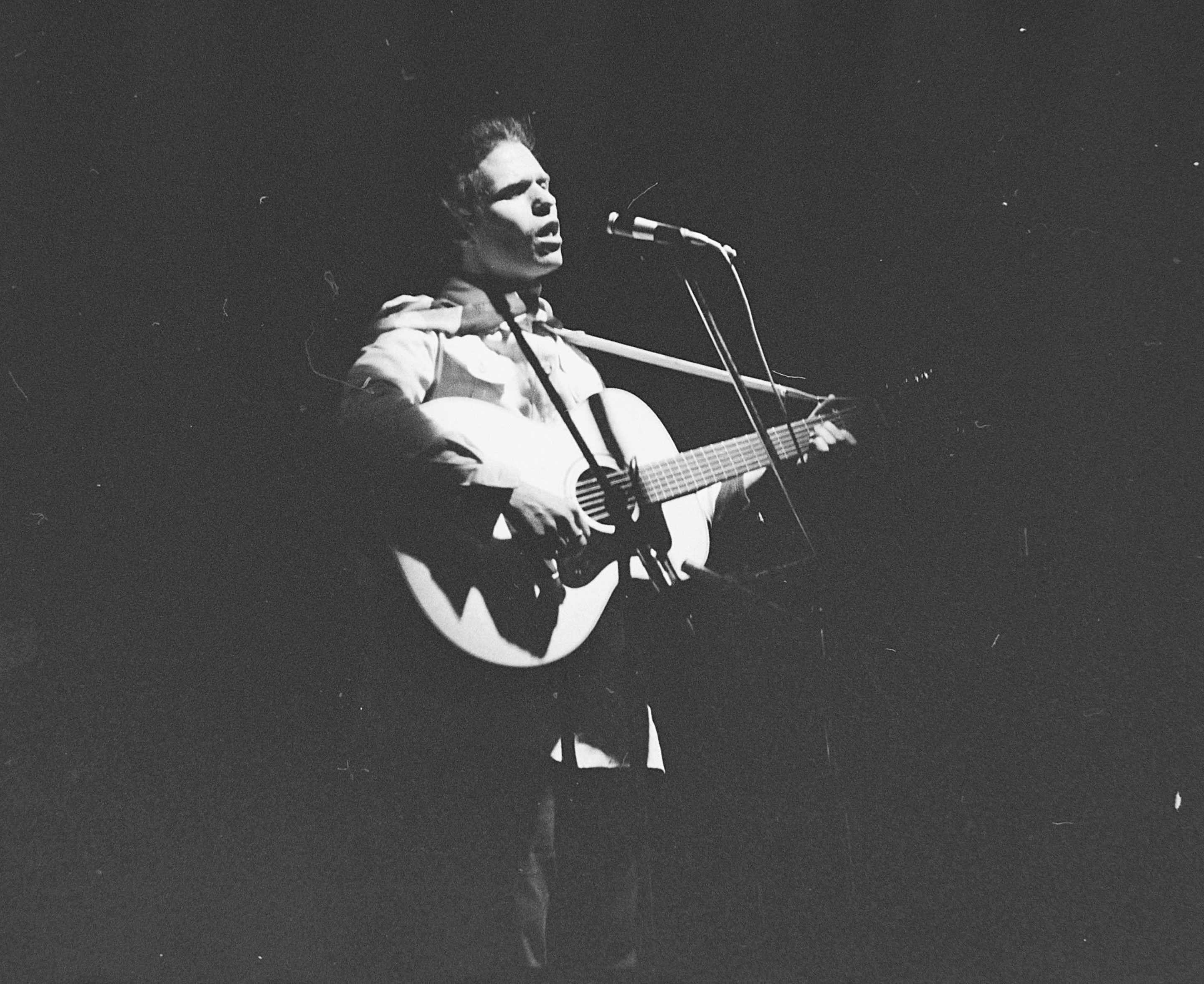
Country Joe McDonald

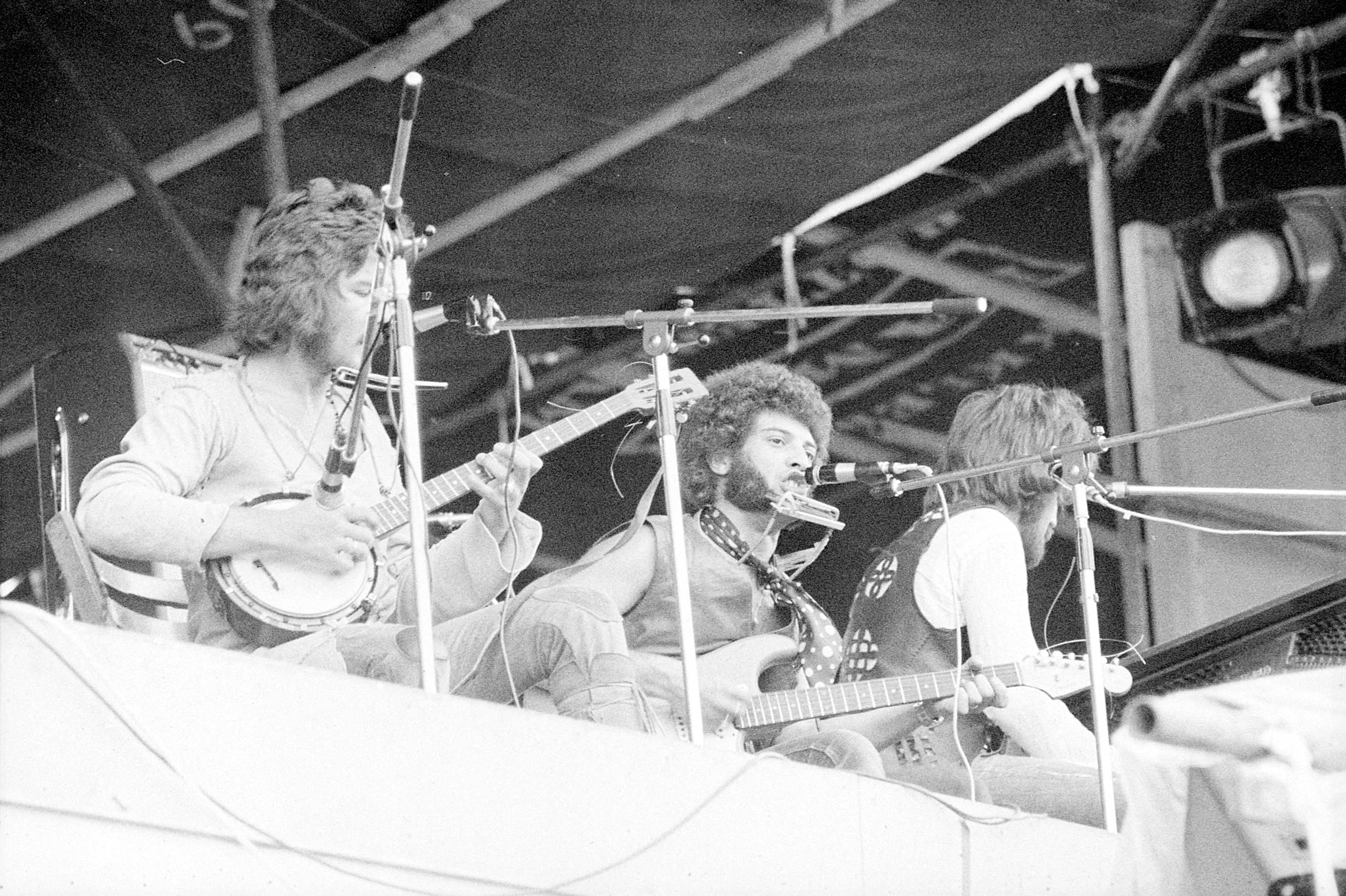
Mungo Jerry & Ray Dorset

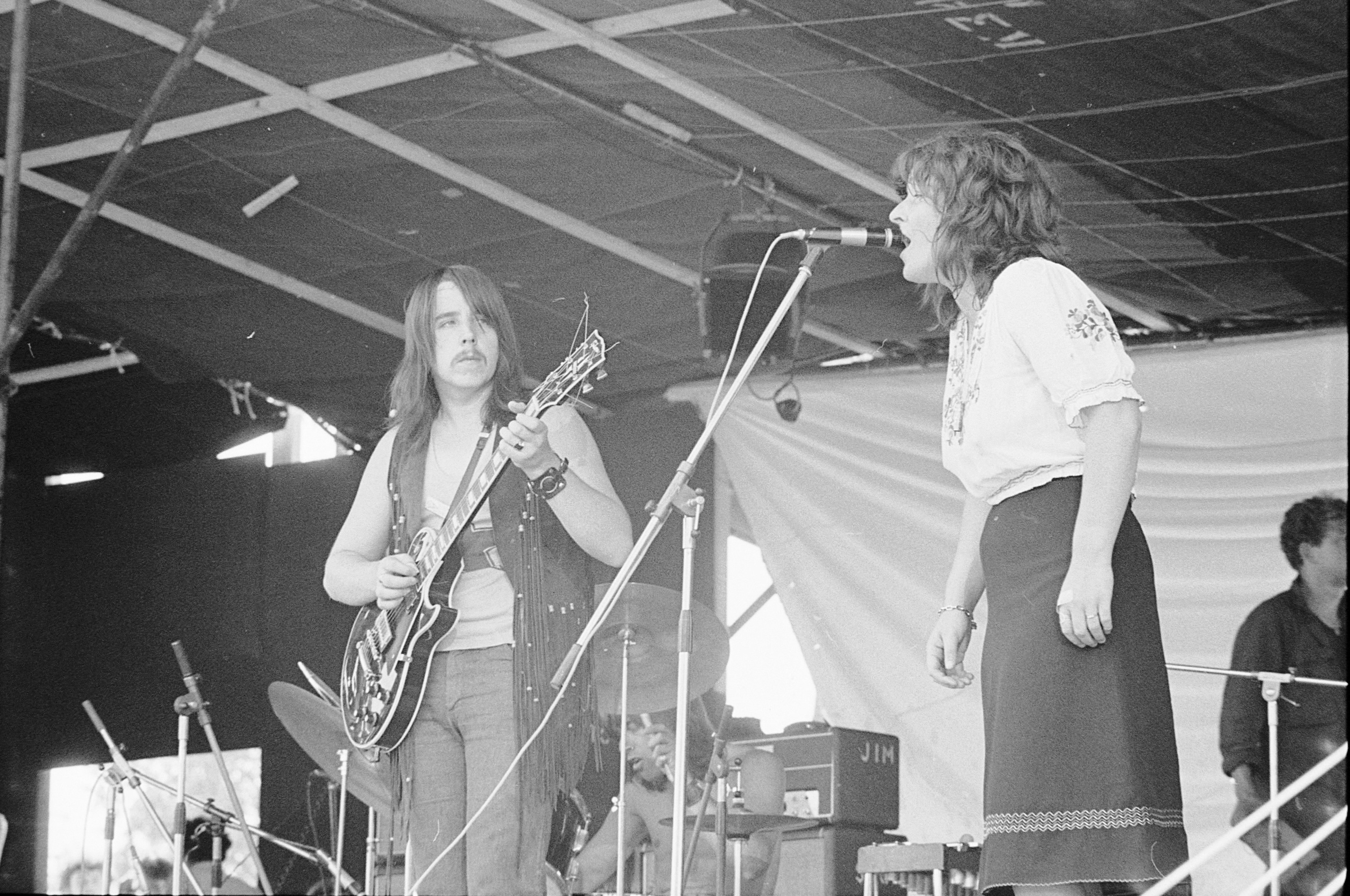
Stone the Crows

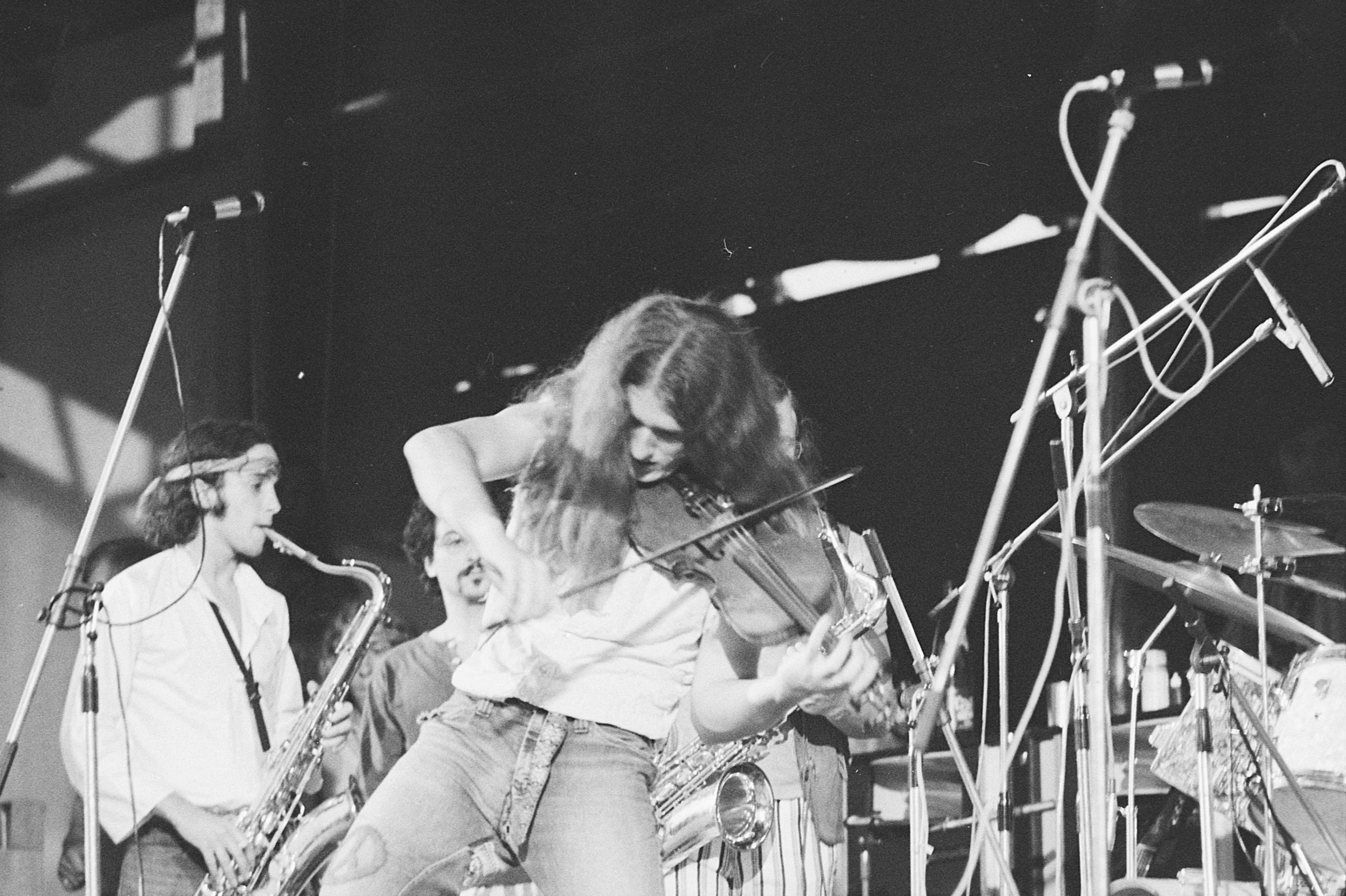
The Flock

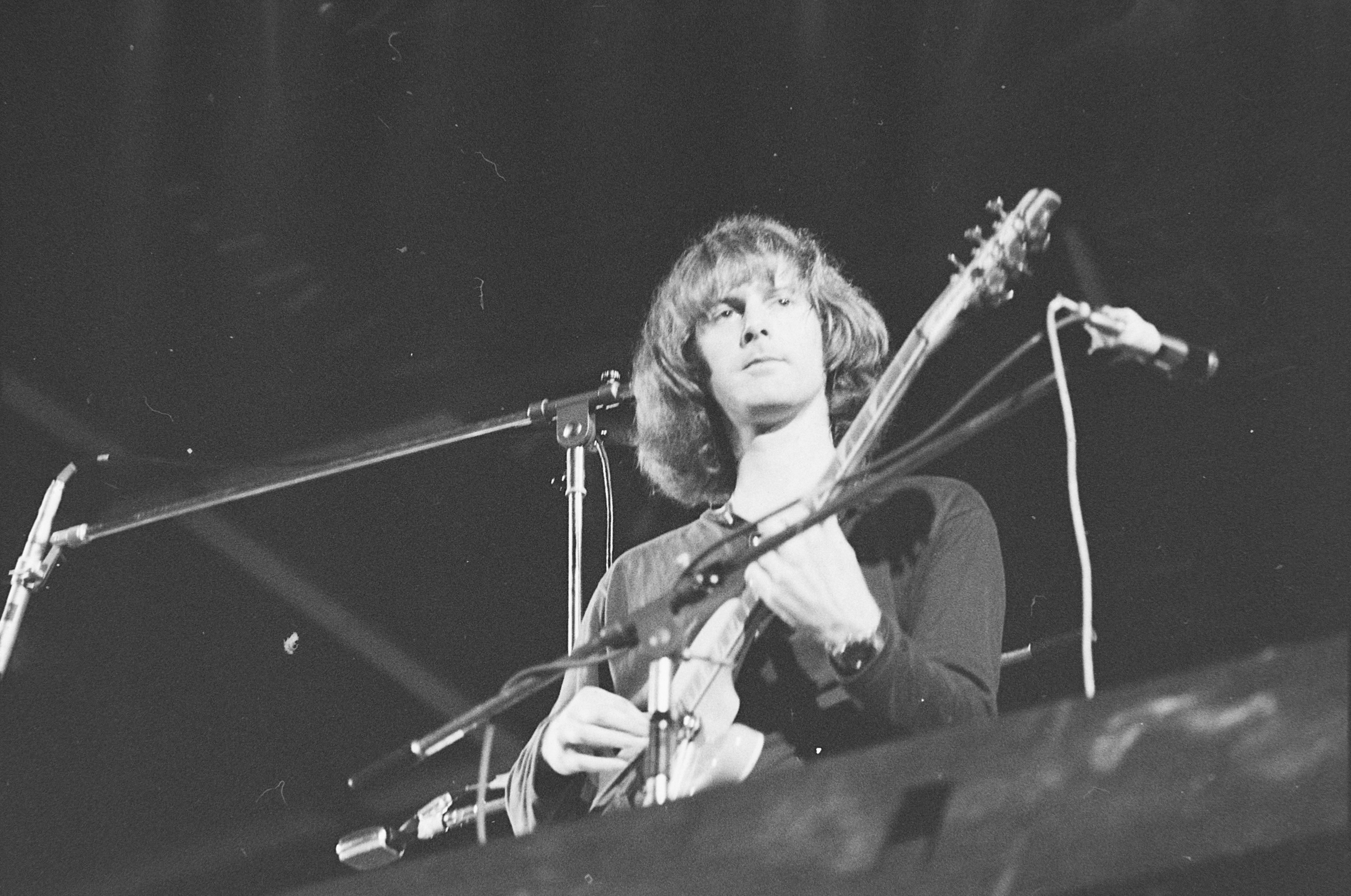
Roger McGuinn

The Festival became an influential event, as it turned out to be the actual beginning of the Dutch tolerance policy towards marijuana. The many present undercover cops did not arrest any of the users or small traders: it became clear that there were just too many, and all of them peaceful.

In 1971, a documentary about the festival appeared, titled Stamping Ground, created by Hansjürgen Pohland aka Jason Pohland and George Sluizer. The film was made for an international audience and is also known under the titles Love and Music, and in Germany Rock Fieber. Also, several books and exhibitions have been dedicated to the event. A triple lp-boxset was released in 2010. The Dutch Festival 1970 (Kralingen) was organized by Foundation "Holland Pop Festival" (Piet van Daal, Georges Knap, Toos v.d.Sterre, Berry Visser)

On 21 September 2013, a memorial has been unveiled in the Kralingse Bos area, to commemorate the first multi-day open air popfestival on the European continent.

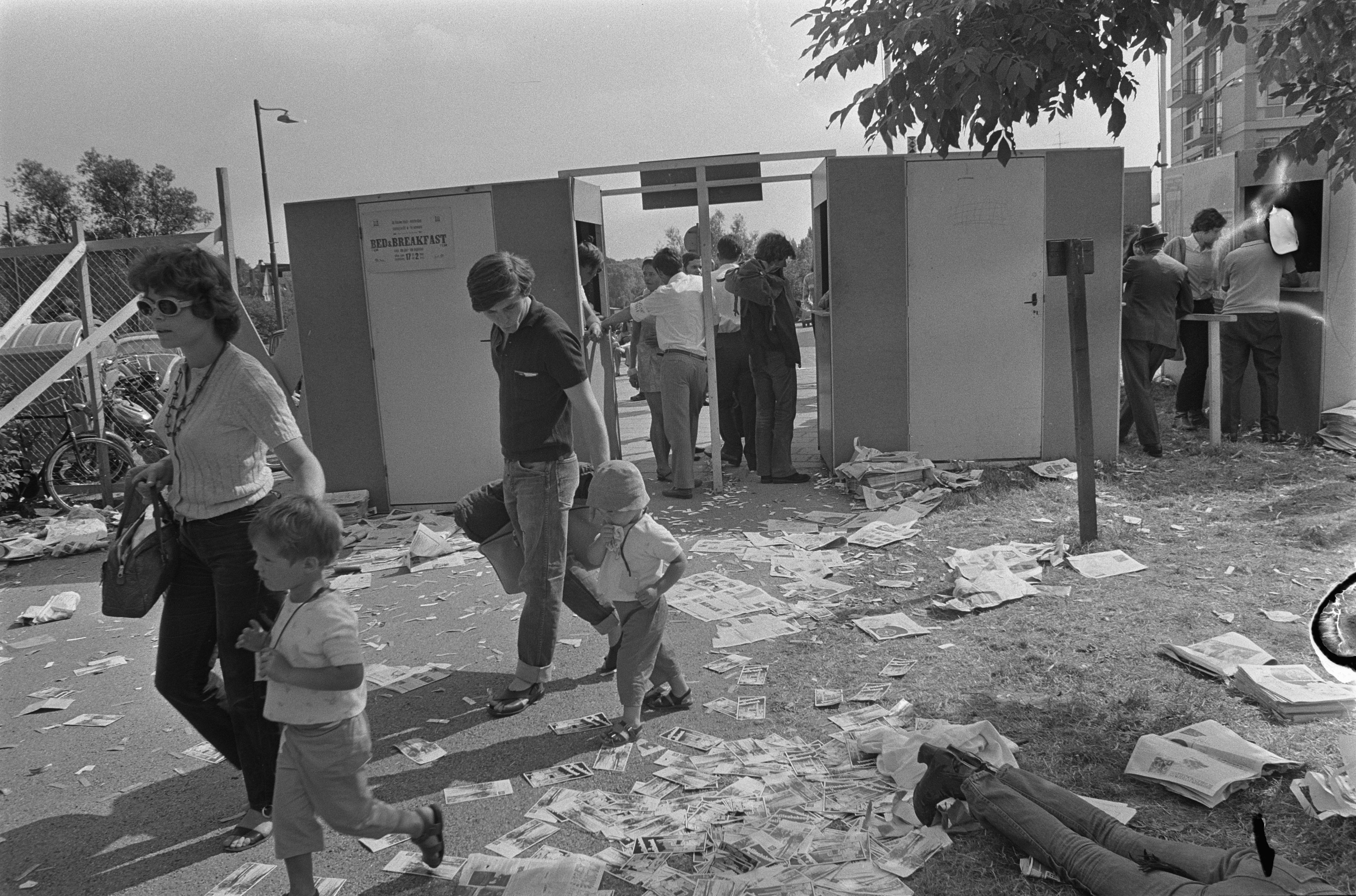
Ticket sales

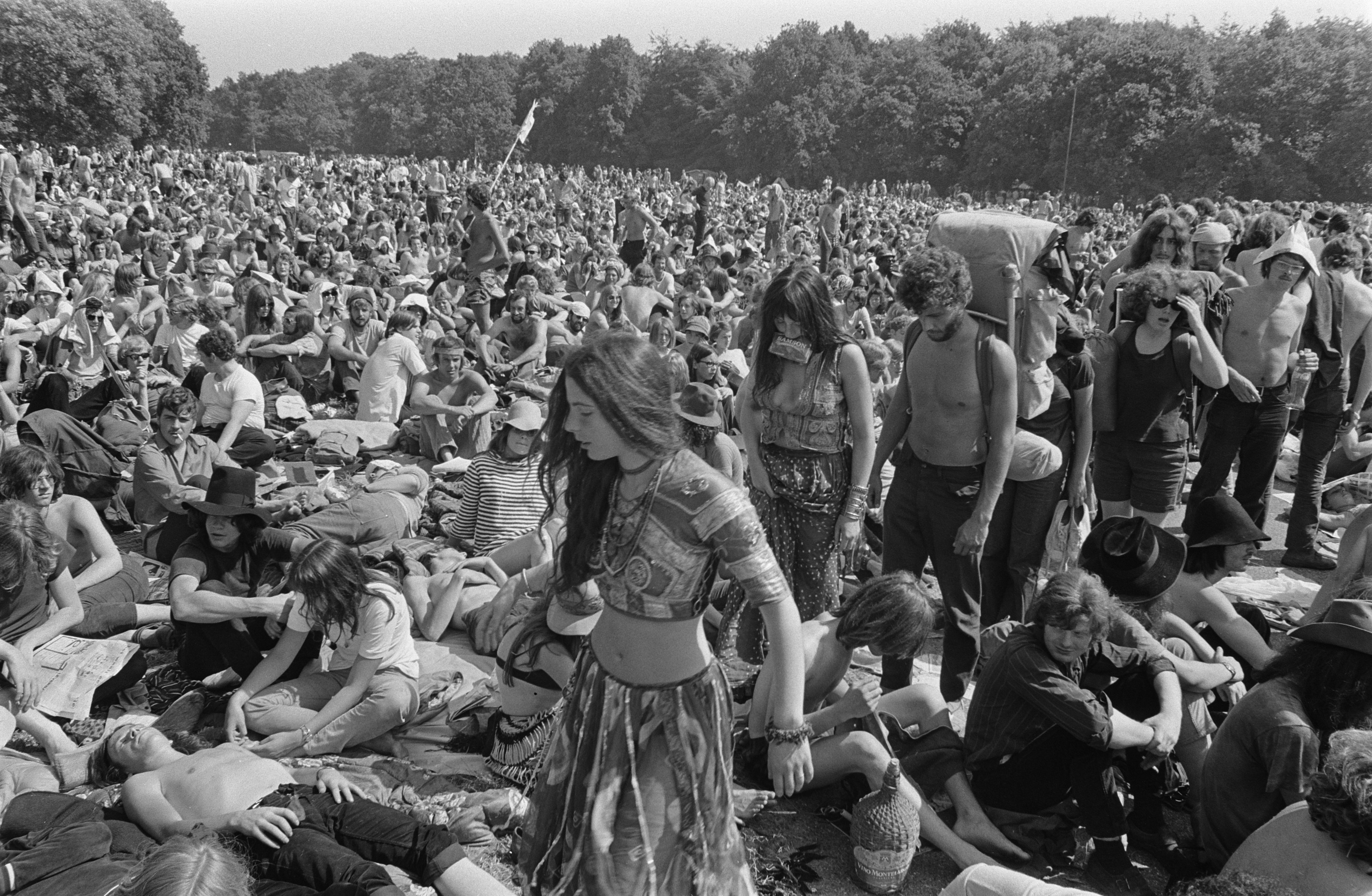
Audience

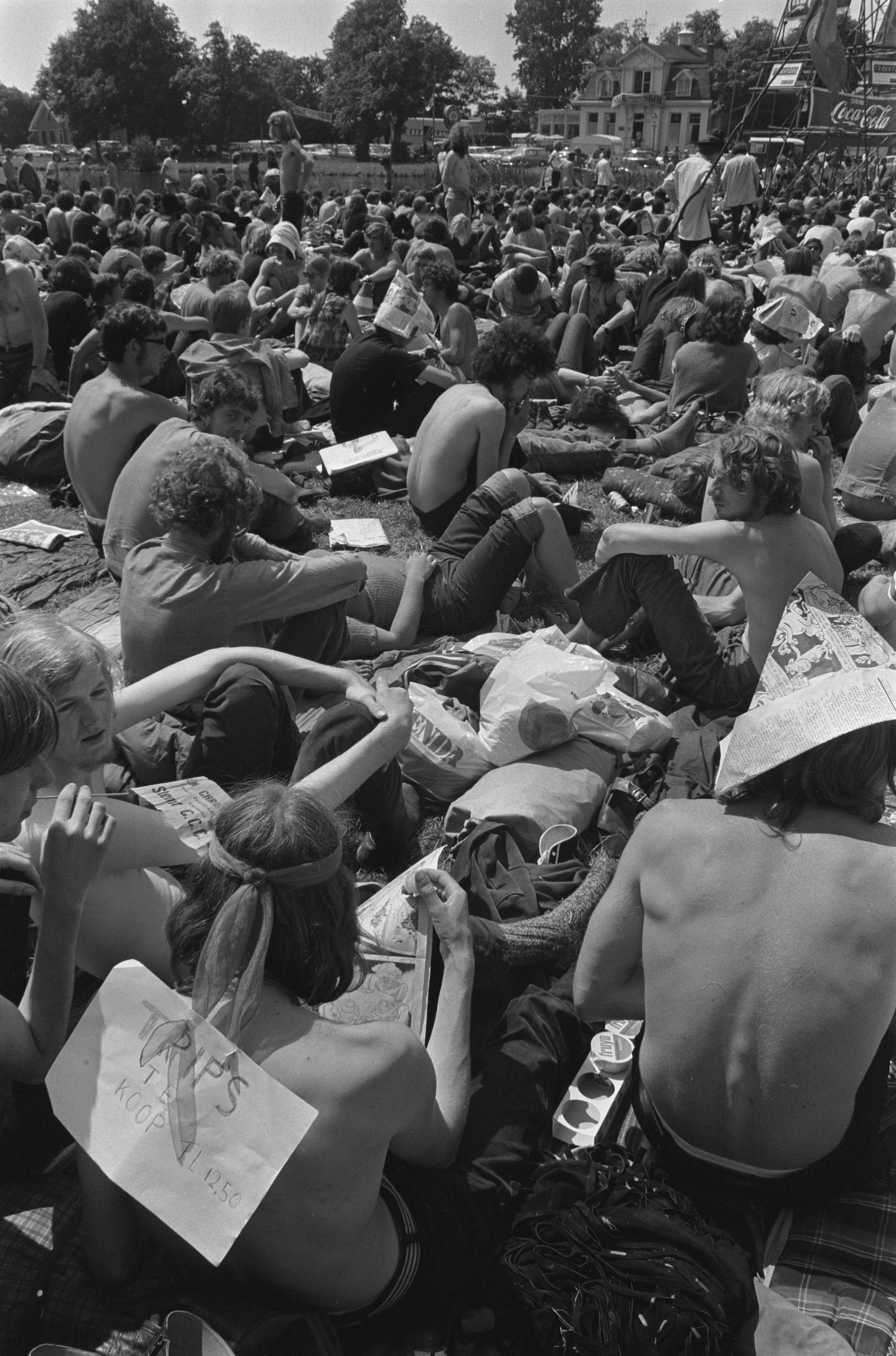
Selling "trips"

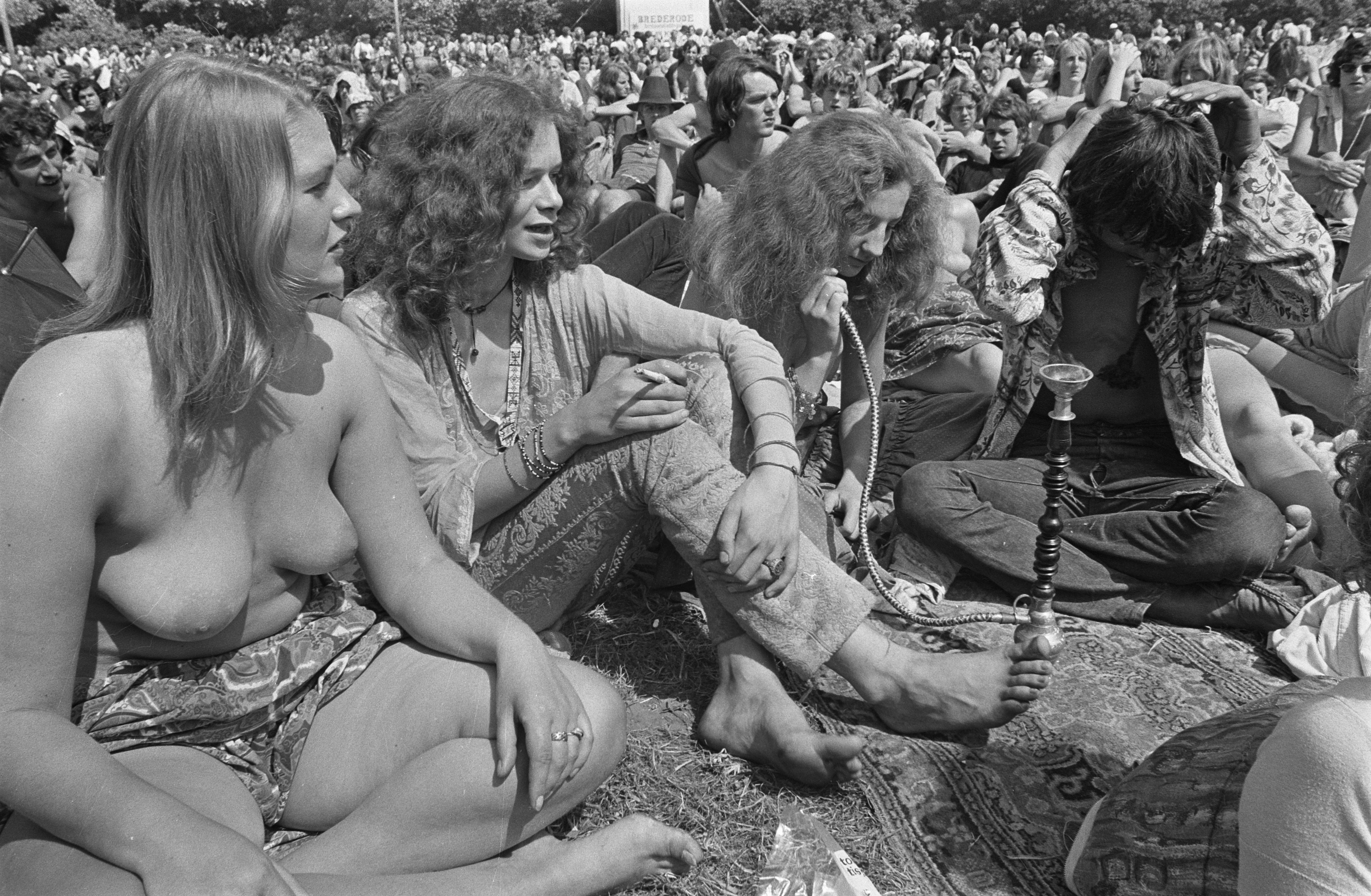
Audience

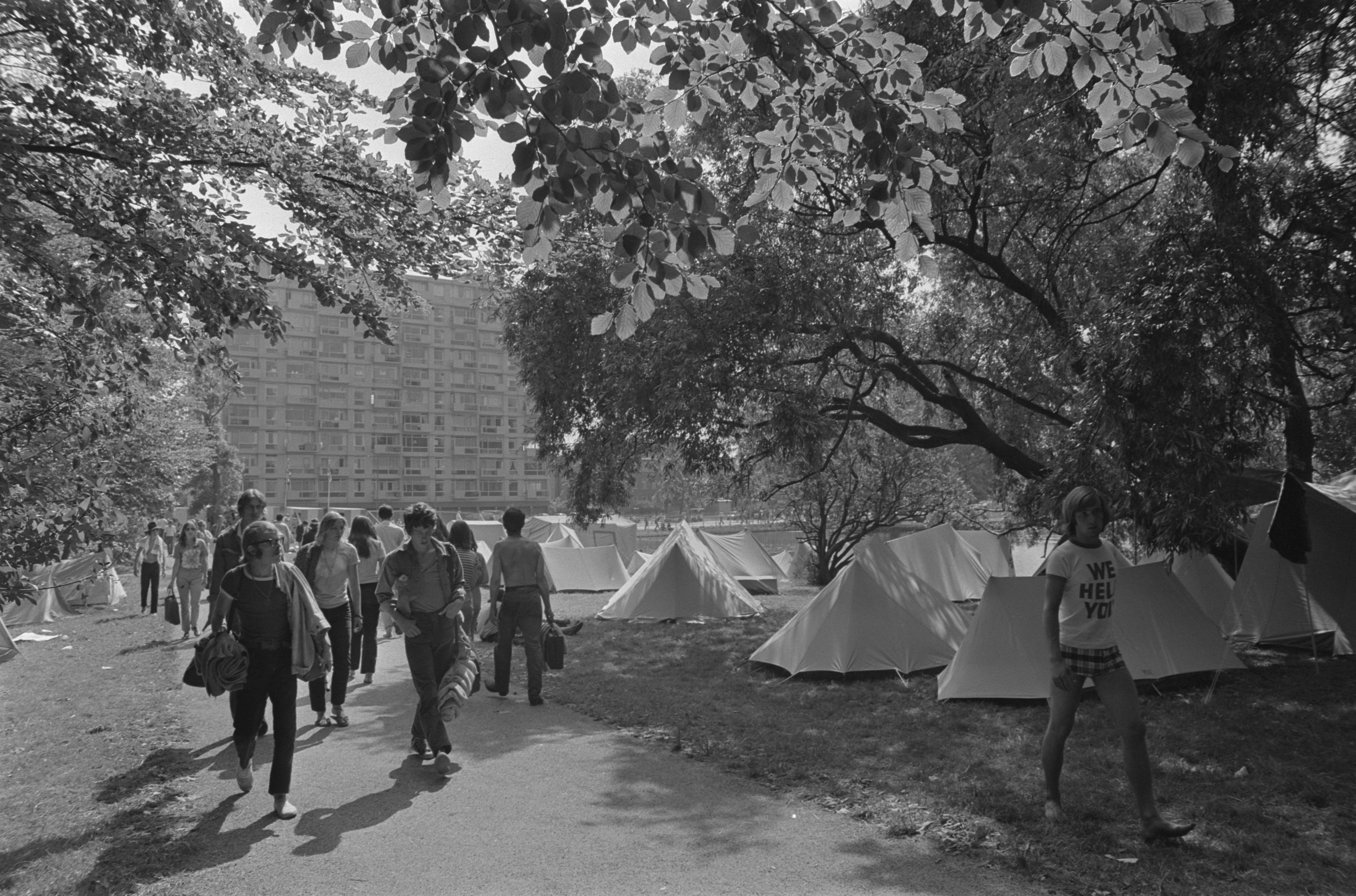
Campsite

== Acts on the main stage ==
Friday, 26 June:

- It's a Beautiful Day
- Jefferson Airplane
- Stone the Crows
- Santana
- The Flock
- Canned Heat
- Hot Tuna
- Pentangle
- Quintessence
- East of Eden (billed, but didn't perform)

Saturday, 27 June:

- The Byrds
- Family
- Dr. John the Night Tripper
- Country Joe McDonald
- Tyrannosaurus Rex
- Renaissance (billed, but didn't perform)
- Third Ear Band
- Al Stewart
- Tata Mirando Gypsy Orchestra
- CCC Folk & Blues Inc.
- Supersister

Sunday, 28 June:

- Mungo Jerry
- Art Ensemble of Chicago
- John Surman
- Han Bennink
- Caravan
- Fairport Convention
- Fotheringay
- Soft Machine
- Pink Floyd

== Other performances ==
Several Dutch bands (including Ekseption, Focus and the Oscar Benton Blues Band) also performed, on a smaller stage (tent) in the vicinity.

== Audio, video and publications ==
- [1-DVD + 2-CD] The Dutch Woodstock. Gonzo, 2013.
- [3 LP records (bootleg)] Kralingen (NL, 1971)
- [3 LP records (bootleg)] Stamping Ground. Kralinger (sic) Music Festival (26-27-28 June 1970, Rotterdam, Holland). Akarma Deluxe AD 535 (different setlist).
- [Video] Stamping ground. Holland festival of music, prod. by Wolf Schmidt, Sam Waynberg; dir. by Jason Pohland. Den Haag, Concorde Video, 1986. Original ed.: Cine 3-planet Film, 1970 (ca. 100 min.)
- (in Dutch) Peter Sijnke & Marcel Koopman: Kralingen. Holland Pop Festival 1970. Haarlem, Uitgeverij In de Knipscheer, 2013. ISBN 978-90-6265-813-8 With audio-CD
- (in Dutch) Peter Sijnke, Marcel Koopman & John Blaak: Holland Pop Festival 1970. Drie legendarische dagen in Kralingen. Rotterdam, Donker, 2010. ISBN 978-90-6100-641-1
- (in Dutch) Theo Knippenberg & Patty Knippenberg: Kralingen '70, 'n grote blijde bende. Utrecht, Knippenberg, 1971. No ISBN

== See also ==
- List of historic rock festivals
