= Dave's Place =

Dave's Place was a national Australian weekly musical variety television show starring Dave Guard, formerly of The Kingston Trio and The Whiskeyhill Singers. Guard as host was joined each Sunday night with Dave's Place Group, performing several folk songs. The series was set in a tropical South Pacific tea house, where popular folk guest performers entertained on the club's small stage. Queenie Paul, the well-known Australian comedian, played the recurring part of an out-of-touch, aged bar fly who was seen preferring to watch TV than to engage in the show. Glamorous, exotic hostesses served the patrons while they listened to the folk and jazz ensembles. The showed was telecast in 1965 for thirteen episodes.

== Dave's Place Group ==
Dave's Place Group performed with Guard singing several traditional folk songs on the shows. The members were Dave Guard, Chris Bonett on bass, Len Young on drums. The female singers were Kerrilee Male (who later recorded in London as a member of folk rock group Eclection), Frances Stone and Norma Shirlee Stoneman, each rotating in the trio over the various weekly shows.

== See also ==
- List of Australian music television shows
