= Shelagh McDonald =

Scottish folk singer (born 1948)

- Born: 1948 (age 77–78); Edinburgh, Scotland
- Genres: Folk, British folk rock
- Occupation: Singer-songwriter
- Instruments: Guitar, vocals, piano
- Years active: 1968–1971, 2012–present
- Labels: B&C Records, Sanctuary Records Group
- Website: Official website

Shelagh McDonald (born 1948 in Edinburgh) is a Scottish folk singer, songwriter and guitarist who released two albums before her abrupt disappearance in 1971. Nothing further was heard of her until 2005, when she made contact with the Scottish Daily Mail to tell the story of her intervening years. In 2013 she returned to public performances and made new recordings for the first time since the early 1970s.

== Early life ==
McDonald was born in 1948 in Edinburgh and moved to Glasgow, at the age of 12, with her parents, She was privately educated before moving on to the Glasgow School of Art.

== Career ==
On her first two albums, McDonald was backed up by many notables within the English folk-rock scene, including Richard Thompson, Dave Mattacks, Danny Thompson, Keith Tippett, Keith Christmas, the Fotheringay rhythm section, as well as Ian Whitman, Roger Powell and Michael Evans, then members of Mighty Baby. During the recording sessions for her third album in 1971, she mysteriously disappeared following a bad trip on LSD.

On 23 June 2005, by which time McDonald's albums had been reissued on CD, an article by Charles Donovan appeared in The Independent, the first high-profile piece about McDonald's disappearance. This prompted copycat features in local papers, the Glasgow Herald and the Scottish Daily Mail. It was the latter of these that caught the eye of McDonald herself. In November 2005, McDonald turned up in the offices of the Scottish Daily Mail and told them her story. She retreated from public life after a bad LSD trip left her paranoid and hallucinating, with a ruined voice. Living with her parents and working privately in Edinburgh, she met and married bookseller Gordon Farquhar; together, they lived a nomadic lifestyle in Scotland, living on welfare benefits and moving from house to house, and later tent to tent.

After that nothing more was heard of her until 2012, when she spoke to fRoots magazine. In the new interview she revealed that, since her partner's death earlier in the year, she had resumed contact with other folk musicians and was cautiously planning low-key live appearances and hoping to record new material. In an October 2013 interview with The Guardian, she revealed that she had, in fact, recorded a new album, though she provided no further details about it. The new album, called Parnassus Revisited, with several new songs, was made available at gigs, but has not been widely distributed. A collaboration with Galloway indie folk band The Razorbills, "Fame Fatale", was broadcast on Stuart Maconie's The Freak Zone in 2014; McDonald also performed with this band on a number of occasions, and with Nigel H. Seymour.

On 16 January 2013, McDonald made her first official public appearance, after more than 40 years away, as a guest of The False Beards at the Green Note, Camden, London. Among her half-hour set of previously unrecorded material, she also played her version of the traditional song "Let No Man Steal Your Thyme" from her first album. A series of small appearances took place in 2014, mainly at Scottish venues, and a similar but longer tour in 2017, in collaboration with Nigel H. Seymour followed, which took in some appearances in England. It was also announced that a recording called Timescapes was forthcoming.

== Discography ==
. Dungeon Folk - BBC Records 1969

- Album – B&C Records, 1970
- Stargazer – B&C Records, 1971
- Club Folk - Peg Records PS2 1972
- Club Folk 2 – Peg Records PS3, 1972 (one track: " Rainy Night Blues")
- Let No Man Steal Your Thyme – Sanctuary Records, 2005
- Parnassus Revisited – Shelagh McDonald, 2013

== See also ==
- List of solved missing person cases: 1950–1999
