= The Hellecasters =

American guitar group

The Hellecasters (1998-2002) was an American guitar group composed of prominent session musicians and a core trio of guitarists, Will Ray, John Jorgenson and Jerry Donahue.

== History ==
In 1990, Donohue ran into Ray at the Palomino and proposed that they play a set together at an open-mic session at the same club. Ray suggested that they ask Jorgenson to join them so as to have three-part harmonies. The band's name was coined by Jorgenson.

Michael Nesmith attended the April 1991 show and signed them to his record label. Their first two albums, The Return of the Hellecasters and Escape from Hollywood, were released by Nesmith's Pacific Arts Audio label.

In 1998 they appeared on the German music show Ohne Filter. They also performed a concert there and, in 2000, released the album Live... Raw... In Germany.

In 2002, the band released its final album, Essential Listening Volume 1, a 13-track compilation which included two new songs.

In 2012, the three guitarists performed at Dekes Guitar Geek Festival in Anaheim.

== Personnel ==
- Guitar & Vocals: Jerry Donahue, John Jorgenson, Will Ray
- Bass: Dennis Belfield, Bob Birch, John Davis, Pat Donaldson, Davey Faragher
- Drums: Steve Duncan, Donald Lindley, Charlie Morgan, Tom Walsh
- Percussion: Luis Conte, Steve Duncan

== Discography ==
=== Albums ===
Year	Title	Label
1993	The Return of the Hellecasters	Pharaoh
1994	Escape from Hollywood	Pharaoh
1997	Hell 3: New Axes to Grind	Pharaoh
2000	Live... Raw... In Germany	Pharaoh
2002	Essential Listening 1	Hightone

=== Multi-artist collection ===
Year	Title	Label
2000	Guitars That Rule the World Vol 2 - Smell the Fuzz - The Superstar Guitar Album	Metal Blade Records
