= Jerry Donahue =

American guitarist & producer (born 1946)

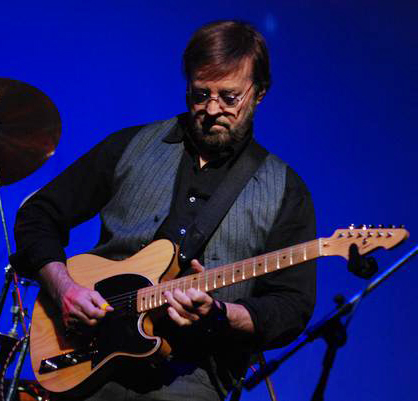
- Jerry Donahue playing his Peavey Omniac JD in 2008

Background information
- Born: 24 September 1946 (age 80); Manhattan, New York City, US
- Genres: British folk rock; blues rock; country
- Occupations: Musician; producer
- Instrument: Guitar
- Website: myspace.com/jerrydonahue

Jerry Donahue (born September 24, 1946, Manhattan, New York City) is an American guitarist and producer primarily known for his work in the British folk rock scene as a member of Fotheringay and Fairport Convention as well as being a member of the rock guitar trio The Hellecasters.

== Biography ==
Donahue was born in New York, the son of big band saxophonist Sam Donahue and actress Patricia Donahue and grew up in Los Angeles. Encouraged by his parents, Donahue took classical guitar lessons as a child, but it was Gerry McGee (who later joined The Ventures) who made the biggest impression on him, when the 14-year-old Donahue witnessed him playing a behind-the-nut bend at a performance at the Sea Witch, emulating Earl Scruggs' banjo technique. Donahue then took lessons from McGee. Regarding regular bends on the fretboard, Donahue cites Amos Garrett as a major influence. Other influences in his formative years were Chet Atkins, Duane Eddy, The Shadows and The Ventures; later influences were Clarence White, Danny Gatton, Albert Lee, Tommy Emmanuel and Robben Ford.

After moving to England, Donahue soon became a respected member of the developing British folk rock scene. As a band member, he played with Poet and the One Man Band, Fotheringay and Fairport Convention. Later he recorded and/or toured with artists such as Joan Armatrading, Gerry Rafferty, Robert Plant, Elton John, The Proclaimers, Mick Greenwood, Johnny Hallyday, Gary Wright, Cliff Richard, Chris Rea, Warren Zevon, Bonnie Raitt, Hank Marvin, Roy Orbison, Nanci Griffith, Iain Matthews, The Beach Boys and The Yardbirds. In 1990 he founded the guitar trio The Hellecasters with Will Ray and John Jorgenson. They recorded several instrumental albums and frequently toured in the 1990s and early 2000s. Donahue has released instructional videotapes and more recently has produced solo projects including Sandy Denny's Gold Dust (1998) and The Animals' Instinct (2004) as well as finishing the second album by his short-lived Folk rock band Fotheringay in 2008.

In 2009, Donahue formed the band Gathering – Legends of Folk Rock with Clive Bunker, Rick Kemp, Ray Jackson, Doug Morter and daughter Kristina Donahue.

Jerry joined The Electric Revelators duo Gordon Wride & Simon Gregory in February 2011 for a UK tour of The Songs Of Robert Johnson in celebration of the king of delta blues birth in 1911. During this period The Electric Revelators featuring Jerry Donahue, Gordon Wride and Simon Gregory headlined the Acoustic Stage Colne Blues Festival August 2011, once again performing the songs of Robert Johnson – this was a one off festival appearance.

On July 29, 2016, Donahue suffered a catastrophic, paralyzing stroke. According to reports published several weeks later, doctors told his family that he would probably never play the guitar again.

== Style and techniques ==
Feeling at home in the US as well as in the UK, Donahue musically draws from influences of both countries like Celtic music, rock, blues and country. Technically, Donahue mostly plays in fingerpicking or hybrid picking style with his right hand. However, his left hand technique made him famous among guitar players: Since his first encounter with guitarists Gerry McGee and Amos Garrett as a teenager, Donahue was fascinated by and eventually mastered the technique of string "bending", often bending several strings at once and even bending notes by pressing down the strings beyond the nut (by the headstock). Telecaster player Danny Gatton praised him as "the string-bending king of the planet".

== Equipment ==
Around 1997, Fender made a Jerry Donahue signature Stratocaster in Japan, but Donahue's style and technique are closely associated with his signature Fender Telecaster (from Japan) and the Telecaster in general. His signature Stratocaster was even modified with a metal plate under the bridge pickup to more closely emulate the Telecaster sound. The JD Telecaster is noticeable for replacing the chrome Tele neck pickup with a Strat pickup and the addition of a 5-way switch with custom wiring. More recently (2005) Peavey released the Omniac JD signature guitar.

The current guitar bearing the Jerry Donahue name is the Fret King Black Label Jerry Donahue model, designed by Jerry and the world-renowned guitar designer, Trev Wilkinson. Guitarist magazine in the UK have given this guitar the coveted Guitarist's Choice award with 4.5 stars out of 5. The Vintage brand (which, like Fret King, is owned by the John Hornby Skewes & Co. Ltd.), also offers a more affordable signature model, the Vintage V58JD, which has been available since 2014.

Still popular on the used music gear market is the Jerry Donahue signature Award-Session Sessionmaster Compact JD10 live/recording preamp pedal which was made in England from 1979 to 2004. The JD10 offers a range of classic clean and overdrive tones with speaker emulation and also acts as a line-driver/buffer.

== Discography ==
Partial discography only, for a fuller list, refer to the Hellecasters site and Jerry Donahue at Allmusic.

- Fotheringay: Fotheringay (Island 1970)***.
- Johnny Hallyday: Live at the Palais des Sports (Paris, 1971)
- Fairport Convention: Rosie (Island, March 1973)
- Fairport Convention: Nine (Island, October 1973)
- Fairport Convention: A Moveable Feast (Island, October 1974)
- Fairport Convention: Rising for the Moon (Island, July 1975)
- Thieves: Yucatan (Arista, 1979)
- Jerry Donahue: Telecasting (Spindrift, 1986)
- Jerry Donahue: Meetings (Fun, 1988)
- Jerry Donahue: Neck of the Wood (Cross Three, Road Goes on... 1992)
- Jerry Donahue: Country Tech (CPP, Warner Bros., 1992)
- Jerry Donahue: Telecasting Recast (Pharaoh, 1999)
- Fotheringay: Fotheringay 2 (Fledg'ling, 2008)
- Arlen Roth: Telemasters (Aquinnah Records, 2019) "Promised Land"
- Jerry Donahue & Susan Rey: Ashgrove Sessions (Susan Rey Music, 2017)
- Svenson feat. Jerry Donahue: Yeehaw Journey into Twang (Zimbalam, 2016)
