= Nine (Fairport Convention album) =

Studio album by Fairport Convention
- Released: October 1973
- Recorded: July – August 1973
- Studio: Sound Techniques, London
- Genre: British folk rock
- Label: Island (UK); A&M (US)
- Producer: Trevor Lucas, John Wood and Fairport Convention

Fairport Convention chronology
Rosie (1973)	Nine (1973)	Fairport Live Convention (1974)

Professional ratings
Review scores
Source	Rating
Allmusic	2/5 stars

Nine is a 1973 album by the British folk rock group Fairport Convention. It is their ninth album since their debut in 1968, and the second to include Trevor Lucas and Jerry Donahue. No original members of Fairport Convention were involved in making the album. According to AllMusic, it is the band's most uneven album.

"Polly on the Shore" was re-recorded by the 21st-century lineup of Fairport Convention (using only Dave Pegg from the Nine-era lineup) for their album Sense of Occasion in 2007, with Simon Nicol on lead vocals. The same lineup later re-recorded "The Hexhamshire Lass" in a new arrangement for 2012's By Popular Request. This version featured Chris Leslie on lead vocals.

== Track listing ==
Side one

1. "The Hexhamshire Lass" (Traditional; arranged by Fairport Convention) – 2:31
2. "Polly on the Shore" (Music: Pegg, Words: Traditional; arranged by Swarbrick, Lucas) – 4:56
3. "The Brilliancy Medley/Cherokee Shuffle" (Traditional) – 3:56
4. "To Althea, from Prison" (Words: Richard Lovelace; Music: Dave Swarbrick) – 5:10
5. "Tokyo" (Donahue) – 2:52

Side two

6. "Bring 'Em Down" (Lucas) – 5:59
7. "Big William" (Lucas, Swarbrick) – 3:25
8. "Pleasure and Pain" (Lucas, Swarbrick) – 5:03
9. "Possibly Parsons Green" (Lucas, Roche) – 4:42

Bonus tracks on CD reissue

10. "The Devil in the Kitchen (Fiddlestix)" – 2:49
11. "George Jackson" (Live) (Bob Dylan) – 2:49
12. "Pleasure and Pain" (Live) – 4:59
13. "Six Days on the Road" (Live) – 3:44

Bonus tracks recorded live at The Howff, London on April 23, 1973.

== Personnel ==
Fairport Convention

- Trevor Lucas - acoustic guitar, lead vocals (2, 6, 9), chorus (8), backing vocals
- Dave Swarbrick - violin, lead vocals (1, 4, 7), verse (8) and backing vocals, viola, mandolin (7)
- Jerry Donahue - acoustic and electric guitars
- Dave Pegg - bass, backing vocals, mandolin (3)
- Dave Mattacks - drums, percussion, bass (3), harmonium (4), clavinet (5)
