= Sense of Occasion =

Studio album by Fairport Convention
- Released: 12 February 2007
- Recorded: November 2006
- Studio: Woodworm Studios, Oxfordshire
- Genre: British folk rock
- Length: 1:07:39
- Label: Matty Grooves
- Producer: Mark Tucker with Fairport Convention

Fairport Convention chronology
Over the Next Hill (2004)	Sense of Occasion (2007)	Festival Bell (2011)

Sense of Occasion is a 2007 album by British folk rock veterans Fairport Convention, recorded in November 2006 in the band's own Woodworm studio in Oxfordshire, and released in February on the band's own Matty Grooves Records label. The band have released over 30 albums since their debut, Fairport Convention, in 1968.

The year 2007 marks the 40th anniversary of the band, although only one member, Simon Nicol, remains from the original line-up.

== Reception ==
In a review on AllMusic, Chris Nickson felt that despite personnel changes, the band continue to produce fine folk rock, as they have done for the past 40 years; though they lack development and edge, and the music sounds too comfortable.

== Track listing ==
1. "Keep on Turning the Wheel" (Chris Leslie) – 4:18
2. "Love on a Farmboy's Wages" (Andy Partridge) – 4:14
3. "The Bowman's Return" (Ric Sanders) – 4:14
4. "South Dakota to Manchester" (Leslie) – 4:12
5. "Spring Song" (Leslie) – 4:37
6. "Polly on the Shore" (Music: Dave Pegg; Lyrics: Dave Swarbrick, Trevor Lucas) – 5:03
7. "Just Dandy" (Sanders) – 2:56
8. "Tam Lin" (Traditional; arranged by Swarbrick) – 7:30
9. "In Our Town" (Leslie) – 3:35
10. "Edge of the World" (Leslie) – 4:08
11. "Hawkwood's Army" (Pete Scrowther) – 4:24
12. "The Vision" (Bob Miller, John Flanagan) – 4:21
13. "Your Heart and Mine" (Sanders) – 3:40
14. "Untouchable" (Glenn Tilbrook, Christopher Braid) – 4:28
15. "Galileo's Apology" (PJ Wright) – 3:04
16. "Best Wishes" (Steve Ashley) – 3:41

== Personnel ==
- Simon Nicol – vocals, acoustic guitar, electric guitar, twelve-string guitar
- Chris Leslie – vocals, mandolin, bouzouki, violin
- Ric Sanders – violin
- Dave Pegg – bass guitar, vocals
- Gerry Conway – drums, percussion, vocals, harmonium
