= Fairport Live Convention =

Live album by Fairport Convention
- Released: July 1974
- Recorded: December 1973 – January 1974
- Genre: British folk rock
- Label: Island
- Producer: Trevor Lucas, John Wood

Fairport Convention chronology
Nine (1973)	Fairport Live Convention (1974)	Rising for the Moon (1975)

Professional ratings
Review scores
Source	Rating
Allmusic	3/5 stars

Fairport Live Convention is a 1974 live album by British folk rock band Fairport Convention originally released in 1974 by Island Records. It was recorded live at the Sydney Opera House, the London Rainbow and the Fairfield Halls, Croydon by John Wood and mixed down at Sound Techniques, London. It was produced by Trevor Lucas & John Wood.

The album was titled A Moveable Feast in the United States and Canada and Fairport Convention Live '75 in Germany.

The original UK LP issue included an inner sleeve photograph of the band posing on the steps of the Sydney Opera House, with Dave Mattacks sporting a shirt bearing the prominent legend "Harrison Birtwistle where its at".

== Track listing ==
Side one

1. "Matty Groves" (Traditional; arranged by Denny, Pegg, Mattacks, Lucas, Swarbrick, Donahue)
2. "Rosie" (Swarbrick)
3. "Fiddlestix" (Traditional; arranged by Lucas, Swarbrick, Donahue, Mattacks, Pegg)
4. "John the Gun" (Denny)
5. "Something You Got" (Chris Kenner)

Side two

1. "Sloth" (Thompson, Swarbrick)
2. "Dirty Linen" (Traditional; arranged by Swarbrick)
3. "Down in the Flood" (Bob Dylan)
4. "Sir B. MacKenzie" (Swarbrick, Thompson, Nicol, Mattacks)

Bonus tracks on CD reissue

1. "The Hexhamshire Lass" (Bob Davenport, Traditional; arranged by Fairport Convention) – 4.09
2. "Polly on the Shore" (Traditional; arranged by Dave Swarbrick, Trevor Lucas) – 5.12
3. "Bring 'Em Down" (Trevor Lucas) – 11.39
4. "Far From Me" (John Prine) – 3.16
5. "That'll Be the Day" (Jerry Allison, Buddy Holly, Norman Petty) – 3.19

== Personnel ==
- Sandy Denny – vocals, piano
- Trevor Lucas – acoustic guitars, vocals
- Jerry Donahue – electric guitar, vocals
- Dave Swarbrick – fiddle, vocals
- Dave Pegg – bass guitar
- Dave Mattacks – drums

Also credited on the original LP sleeve - stage mix by Phil Benton and Roger Proctor, photographs by Stephen Westlund and design co-ordination by Fabio Nicoll Associates and Dave Mattacks.
