= The History of Fairport Convention =

Compilation album by Fairport Convention
- Released: 1972
- Recorded: 1967–1972
- Genre: British folk rock
- Label: Island ICD 4
- Producer: Joe Boyd, Trevor Lucas, Simon Nicol, John Wood, Fairport Convention

Fairport Convention chronology
The Manor Album (1972)	The History of Fairport Convention (1972)	Rosie (1973)

Professional ratings
Review scores
Source	Rating
Allmusic	4.5/5 stars

The History of Fairport Convention is the first compilation of tracks by Fairport Convention, released in 1972.

At the time it was released, it appeared that the band had folded. The cover had a "family tree" by Pete Frame on the front. Another unusual aspect of the album was that a piece of ribbon was glued to the sleeve, making it look as if a royal seal had been embossed on it. Different reissues had blue ribbons, or red or green. Later reissues of the album had no ribbon, but the central seal was shown in a larger size, and the family tree was missing.

== Track listing ==
=== Side one ===
1. "Meet on the Ledge"
2. "Fotheringay"
3. "Mr Lacey"
4. "Book Song"
5. "A Sailor's Life"

=== Side two ===
1. "Si Tu Dois Partir"
2. "Who Knows Where the Time Goes"
3. "Matty Groves"
4. "Crazy Man Michael"

=== Side three ===
1. "Medley: The Lark in the Morning / Rakish Paddy / Foxhunter's Jig / Toss The Feathers (instr)"
2. "Now Be Thankful"
3. "Walk Awhile"
4. "Sloth"
5. "The Bonny Black Hare"

=== Side four ===
1. "Angel Delight"
2. "Bridge Over the River Ash (instr)"
3. "John Lee"
4. "Breakfast in Mayfair"
5. "Hanging Song"
6. "The Hen's March / The Four Poster Bed (instr)"

One cassette version of the album had sides 1 and 2 in the same order on the "A" side, and side 3 and 4 on the "B" side. Another version had the tracks "Si Tu Dois Partir" and "The Hen's March Through The Midden / The Four Poster Bed" switched.

In 1988 a CD version was released. It omitted ""Crazy Man Michael" and "Medley". The family tree was not on the cover, but appeared on an insert. Although the album never reached the charts it was steadfastly in print.

== Certifications ==
Certifications for The History of Fairport Convention
Region	Certification	Certified units/sales
United Kingdom (BPI)	Silver	60,000^{*}
^{*} Sales figures based on certification alone.
