= Chico Arnéz =

British bandleader

Chico Arnéz (real name John Claude Davies) was a London-based Latin bandleader of the 1960s and 1970s. Arnez also played bongo drums and authored a textbook on bongo playing (1959).

Arnéz was born in England. He married Margaret Ketchell, with whom he had two children.

He managed the singer Blanche Finlay.

== Discography ==
- Sound of Chico Arnez
- From Chico With Love
- Chico
- Non Stop Dance Party
- This is Chico, This is Keely
- Unknown Soldier Worships
