= Eclection =

UK musical group

- Origin: London, England
- Genres: Folk rock, progressive rock
- Years active: 1967–1969
- Past members: Georg Hultgreen; Michael Rosen; Trevor Lucas; Kerrilee Male; Gerry Conway; Dorris Henderson; Gary Boyle; John "Poli" Palmer

Eclection were a British-based folk rock band, originally formed in 1967 in London by Norwegian-born Georg Kajanus (then known as Georg Hultgreen), Canadian Michael Rosen, Australians Trevor Lucas and Kerrilee Male, and Briton Gerry Conway. They released one album on Elektra Records before singer Kerrilee Male left to be replaced by Dorris Henderson, but the group broke up in December 1969.

== Formation and initial reception ==
Rosen and Hultgreen met when Hultgreen - who had grown up in Canada - was playing songs in a Bayswater restaurant. They decided to form a group, and recruited Lucas, who had previously recorded in Australia, and in Britain as an accompanist to A. L. Lloyd, after seeing him perform at the 1967 Cambridge Folk Festival. Lucas in turn recommended Kerrilee Male, who had previously worked as a singer with Dave Guard, formerly of The Kingston Trio, on his Australian TV show Dave's Place. The four rehearsed together and acquired the name Eclection - a back-formation to describe their "eclectic" style and origins - at the suggestion of Joni Mitchell, who was playing folk clubs in England at the time and who was a friend of Rosen's girlfriend. On a visit to New York City, the group approached Elektra Records owner Jac Holzman, who then heard them rehearse in London, and offered them a record deal. The quartet made their first public appearance at the Royal Festival Hall in late 1967, supporting Tom Paxton.

The group then added drummer Gerry Conway, a member of Alexis Korner's backing group. Despite their backgrounds, the band regarded themselves as being a "progressive rock" group rather than playing "folk rock", a term which had not yet come into widespread use. They began recording at IBC Studios in London in December 1967, with Australian record producer Ossie Byrne and arranger Phil Dennys, who had both worked on The Bee Gees' first hit "New York Mining Disaster 1941". The songs were recorded as rehearsed, with vocal harmonies and ornate orchestral arrangements overdubbed later. The band released their first single, "Nevertheless", written by Rosen, in June 1968; it received some airplay in the UK but did not chart. They also appeared on Dutch TV, BBC radio, and the BBC TV show Colour Me Pop.

The band's self-titled album, Eclection, was released in August 1968. Eight of the songs were written by Hultgreen, and the remaining three by Rosen. Hultgreen and Rosen also shared the lead vocals with Kerrilee Male, although most critics commented on the strength of Male's voice, Lillian Roxon stating that "Her voice cuts into the brain like a carving knife". The band's style drew comparisons with The Seekers, Jefferson Airplane, The Mamas and The Papas and We Five. Reviewer Richie Unterberger stated: "The combination of male-female harmonies, optimistic lyrics with shades of romantic psychedelia, folk-rock melodies, acoustic-electric six- and twelve-string guitar combinations, and stratospheric orchestration couldn't help but bring to mind similar Californian folk-pop-rock of the mid-to-late 1960s."

Kajanus (Hultgreen) later said:

"The musical direction of the group was probably closer to American folk-rock than anything else. I must confess, having spent my formative musical years haunting the folk clubs in Montreal, Canada and watching all the current folk and folk/rock programs on TV, I was strongly influenced by this music. The most influential artists for me at the time were people like Dylan, the Byrds, Fred Neil, Simon and Garfunkel, the Beach Boys, the Mamas and the Papas, and Gordon Lightfoot. Pre-Eclection, I was a purist fighting the acoustic battle versus the electric "demons" creeping into the scene. I remember being shocked when Dylan went electric. It is therefore ironic that I should end up a few years later playing an electric 12-string in Eclection."

== Later career and split ==
After the album was released, the band began to perform at festivals and in clubs around Britain. Supposed to be their second single, a version of American band Kaleidoscope's song "Please", was recorded in October 1968. However, that month Kerrilee Male decided to leave the band, and returned to Australia. Gerry Conway said: "Once we started playing live, it was very soon apparent that Kerrilee didn't want to stay with it. I think she decided she didn't want to be in the music world." The band immediately replaced her with Dorris Henderson, an African-American singer who had moved to Britain, performed in folk clubs, and recorded a 1965 album with John Renbourn. The single "Please" was re-recorded with Henderson's vocal replacing Male, therefore it is labelled (Mark II). The single was backed with the song "Mark Time", sung by Rosen and Hultgreen.

In December 1968, Eclection supported The Beach Boys on a 10-day tour, and afterwards they continued to tour clubs. Mike Rosen left the band in March 1969, and the band recruited guitarist Gary Boyle, previously a member of The Brian Auger Trinity, and vibraphone player John "Poli" Palmer of Blossom Toes. However, Boyle left again in June to rejoin Auger. The band continued as a five-piece and performed (along with Bob Dylan and The Who) at the Isle of Wight Festival in August 1969, but Hultgreen then decided to leave. Lucas, Conway, Palmer and Henderson continued to tour for several months, finally agreeing to split up in December 1969 when Palmer decided to join Family. Conway said: "We just decided, eventually, that we weren't really going anywhere. Not where we wanted to go, anyway."

Jac Holzman stated:

"I loved that group. They were a fascinating group, a wonderful band, and I thought the records were wonderful. I think our mistake was not bringing them to the States, because they really needed to get out of England. There was too much other stuff competing in England, and in the States, we might have had an easier time. I don't know why we didn't bring 'em. I think, had we got 'em the right venues and gotten them some help with their show, it would have worked."

== Aftermath ==
After Eclection split up, Lucas and Conway formed Fotheringay with Lucas' girlfriend (and later wife) Sandy Denny, formerly of Fairport Convention. Lucas and Denny later both rejoined Fairport Convention for a period; Sandy Denny died in 1978, and Trevor Lucas in 1989. Gerry Conway continued a prolific career as a drummer, with Cat Stevens, Steeleye Span, Fairport Convention, Jethro Tull and others.

Georg Hultgreen was later known as Georg Kajanus, and had commercial success in the mid-1970s with the band Sailor, later forming DATA and Noir with Tim Dry (Tik from Tik and Tok), and writing musicals and soundtracks. Mike Rosen managed the progressive rock band Cressida, and was later a member of Mogul Thrash, before returning to live in Canada. Little is known publicly about Kerrilee Male after her return to Australia. She never stepped back in the music business and died in 12th may 2025 on Magnetic Island in Queensland.

Dorris Henderson headed a new band, Dorris Henderson's Eclection, in the 1970s, with her son Eric Johns. She died in 2005.

The album Eclection was re-issued on CD by Collector's Choice Music in November 2001.

The title of psychedelic folk artist Prydwyn's 2009 album with Quickthorn, 'Solitude Owes Me a Smile', is a paraphrase of a line from Eclection's opening track 'In Her Mind'.
