= Fotheringay =

British folk rock band

- Fotheringay c. 1970

Background information
- Origin: UK
- Genres: Folk rock
- Years active: 1970–1971; 2015–2016
- Label: Island
- Spinoff of: Fairport Convention
- Past members: Gerry Conway; Jerry Donahue; Pat Donaldson; Trevor Lucas; Sandy Denny; Sally Barker; Kathryn Roberts; PJ Wright

Fotheringay was a short-lived British folk rock group, formed in 1970 by singer-songwriter and musician Sandy Denny on her departure from Fairport Convention. The band drew its name from her 1968 composition "Fotheringay" about Fotheringhay Castle, in which Mary, Queen of Scots had been imprisoned. The song originally appeared on the 1969 Fairport Convention album, What We Did on Our Holidays, Denny's first album with that group. The original Fotheringay released one self-titled album but disbanded at the start of 1971 as Denny embarked on a solo career. Forty-five years later, a new version of the band re-formed featuring the three original surviving members together with other musicians, and toured in 2015 and 2016.

== Career ==
Two former members of Eclection, guitarist Trevor Lucas and drummer Gerry Conway, and two former members of Poet and the One Man Band, Jerry Donahue (guitar) and Pat Donaldson (bass), completed the line-up responsible for what was intended to be the quintet's first album. This folk-based set included several Denny original compositions, notably "Nothing More", "The Sea" and "The Pond and The Stream", as well as versions of Gordon Lightfoot's "The Way I Feel" (#71 Canada) and Bob Dylan's "Too Much of Nothing". Though during the year of its original release the album featured in two of the UK's music papers' Top 20s (Melody Maker and NME), it did not meet commercial expectations, and pressures on Denny to undertake a solo career increased. She had been voted Britain's number 1 singer for two consecutive years in Melody Maker's readers poll. The album peaked at No. 18 in the UK Albums Chart.

A special live performance by Fotheringay was recorded at Gruga-Halle in Essen, Germany, on 23 October 1970. The concert tapes were re-mastered by Fotheringay guitarist Jerry Donahue and the album released in 2011.

Fotheringay disbanded in January 1971 during sessions for a projected second album. The album remained unfinished after Denny announced that she was leaving the group and producer Joe Boyd left to take up a job at Warner Brothers in California. Denny would later blame Boyd's hostility towards the group for its demise.

Some of the songs originally earmarked for the second Fotheringay album surfaced on Denny's 1971 debut solo album, The North Star Grassman and the Ravens. Meanwhile, Lucas, Conway and Donahue joined Fairport Convention in 1972 to record that band's Rosie album, on which some Fotheringay material was also used. However, Conway played on three tracks only and began session work afterwards. Both Conway and Donaldson have worked with Fairport's Richard Thompson, amongst many others. Lucas and Donahue stayed with Fairport for another couple of years, the album Nine being released in 1973, while Denny rejoined in 1974. This line-up recorded two additional albums: Fairport Live Convention (re-titled A Movable Feast in the US) and Rising for the Moon. Denny, along with Donahue and Lucas, left Fairport in December 1975. Conway eventually joined a reformed Fairport in 1997.

In 2007, the BBC announced that Donahue would be attempting to complete the abandoned projected second Fotheringay album, which he accomplished using previously unheard takes from the original archived tapes. Completed by the summer of the following year, Fotheringay 2 was released by Fledg'ling Records on 29 September 2008.

A four-disc collection, Nothing More: The Collected Fotheringay, was released on 30 March 2015. This is the most comprehensive compilation of the group’s recordings, and contains, in addition to all the tracks on Fotheringay and Fotheringay 2 as both final studio versions and demos/alternate takes, the complete live concert set from Rotterdam in 1970 (including several previously unreleased tracks), seven Fotheringay tracks recorded in session for BBC radio (which had previously circulated only as bootlegs), plus a DVD disc containing 4 performances by Fotheringay recorded for the German "Beat-Club" TV series in 1970, which considerably augment the otherwise sparse known TV footage of Sandy Denny in particular.

In June 2015, the three surviving members of the original band - Jerry Donahue, Gerry Conway and Pat Donaldson - reunited and played 12 tour dates in England over the next 12 months, followed by gigs in Germany and the Netherlands in September, 2016. They were joined by Kathryn Roberts (Equation, KR & Sean Lakeman), Sally Barker (The Poozies, ‘The Voice’) and PJ Wright (The Dylan Project and Little Johnny England) to provide the harmonious vocals in the absence of Denny and Lucas. They played at Wolverhampton on 28 June 2016.

== Discography ==
- Fotheringay (Island/A&M, 1970)
- Fotheringay 2 (Fledg'ling Records, 2008)
- Fotheringay Essen 1970 (Thor's Hammer Records, 2011)
- Nothing More: The Collected Fotheringay (Universal Music, 2015)

== Bibliography ==
- Mick Houghton. I've Always Kept a Unicorn – The Biography of Sandy Denny. Faber & Faber, 2015; ISBN 0571278914
- Clinton Heylin. No More Sad Refrains – The Life and Times of Sandy Denny. London, Helter Skelter, 2002; ISBN 1-900924-35-8
- Clinton Heylin. Gypsy Love Songs & Sad Refrains – The Recordings of Richard Thompson and Sandy Denny. Labour of Love Productions, 1989.
