= Rosie (Fairport Convention album) =

Studio album by Fairport Convention
- Released: February 1973
- Recorded: July–August 1972
- Studio: Sound Techniques, London (except tracks 3 and 5: 1971)
- Genre: British folk rock
- Label: Island (UK); A&M (US)
- Producer: Trevor Lucas

Fairport Convention chronology
"Babbacombe" Lee (1971)	Rosie (1973)	Nine (1973)

Professional ratings
Review scores
Source	Rating
Allmusic	2.5/5 stars

Rosie is a 1973 album by British folk rock band Fairport Convention, their eighth album since their debut in 1968.

The album was the first to include Australian singer-songwriter-guitarist Trevor Lucas and American lead guitarist Jerry Donahue. Both had previously played with ex-Fairport Sandy Denny, whom Lucas later married, in the short-lived Fotheringay. Here they had effectively replaced Simon Nicol who had quit Fairport to join another ex-member Ashley Hutchings in The Albion Band, thus leaving the band with no founding members until he rejoined in 1976.

Drummer Dave Mattacks also joined the Albion Band for a while but rejoined during the making of Rosie. He only plays on four of the ten tracks; on others, drums are handled alternately by Tim Donald and Gerry Conway. Like Donahue and Lucas, Conway was also ex-Fotheringay, and would himself join Fairport in 1998, becoming the band's drummer until his retirement in 2022

== Track listing ==
Side one

1. "Rosie" (Dave Swarbrick)
2. "Matthew, Mark, Luke & John" (Dave Pegg, Dave Swarbrick)
3. "Knights of the Road" (Trevor Lucas, Peter Roche)
4. "Peggy's Pub" (Dave Pegg)
5. "The Plainsman" (words: Peter Roche; music: Traditional, arranged by Trevor Lucas)

Side two

1. "Hungarian Rhapsody" (Dave Pegg)
2. "My Girl" (Dave Swarbrick)
3. "Me with You" (Dave Swarbrick)
4. "The Hens March Through the Midden & The Four Poster Bed" (Traditional, arranged by Fairport Convention)
5. "Furs and Feathers" (Dave Swarbrick)

A 2004 Island issue, in addition to the previous tracks, featured also the following bonus tracks recorded live on 23 April 1973 at The Howff, Primrose Hill in London:

1. "Matthew, Mark, Luke & John" (Dave Pegg, Dave Swarbrick)
2. "The Hens March Through the Midden & The Four Poster Bed" (Traditional, arranged by Fairport Convention)
3. "Rosie" (remix)
4. "The Claw" (Jerry Reed)
5. "Furs and Feathers" (Dave Swarbrick)

== Personnel ==
Fairport Convention

- Dave Swarbrick – vocals, fiddle, viola, mandolin (4), acoustic guitar (7)
- Trevor Lucas – vocals, 6 and 12-string acoustic guitars
- Jerry Donahue – guitars, backing vocals
- Dave Pegg – vocals, bass, mandolin (4)
- Dave Mattacks – drums (4,9,10), percussion (8), piano (6)

Additional personnel

- Richard Thompson – electric and 12-string guitars ("Rosie")
- Sandy Denny – backing vocals ("Rosie")
- Linda Peters – backing vocals ("Rosie")
- Gerry Conway – drums ("Rosie", "Knights of the Road" and "The Plainsman")
- Tim Donald – drums ("Matthew, Mark, Luke & John", "Hungarian Rhapsody" and "My Girl") (born Timothy Donald, 29 September 1946, Bristol, Somerset)
- Ralph McTell – acoustic guitar ("Me With You")
