= Dave Mattacks =

English drummer (born 1948)

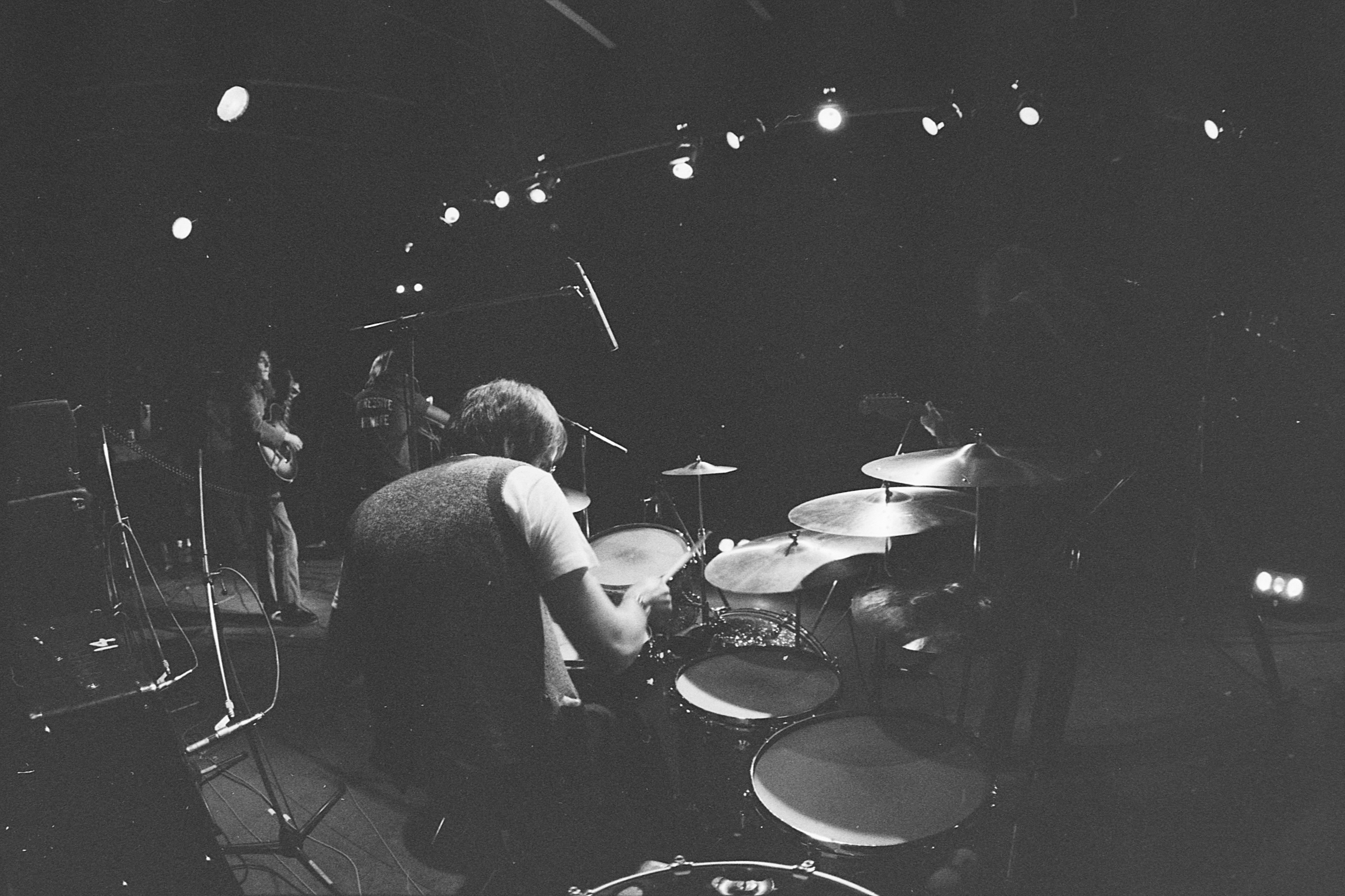
- Mattacks with Fairport Convention, in Kralingen, South Holland, 1970

Background information
- Born: David James Mattacks; 13 March 1948 (age 78); Edgware, Middlesex, England
- Genres: Rock; folk
- Occupation: Drummer
- Instrument: Drums
- Website: davemattacks.com

David James Mattacks (born 13 March 1948) is an English rock and folk drummer, best known for his work with British folk rock band Fairport Convention.

== Fairport Convention ==
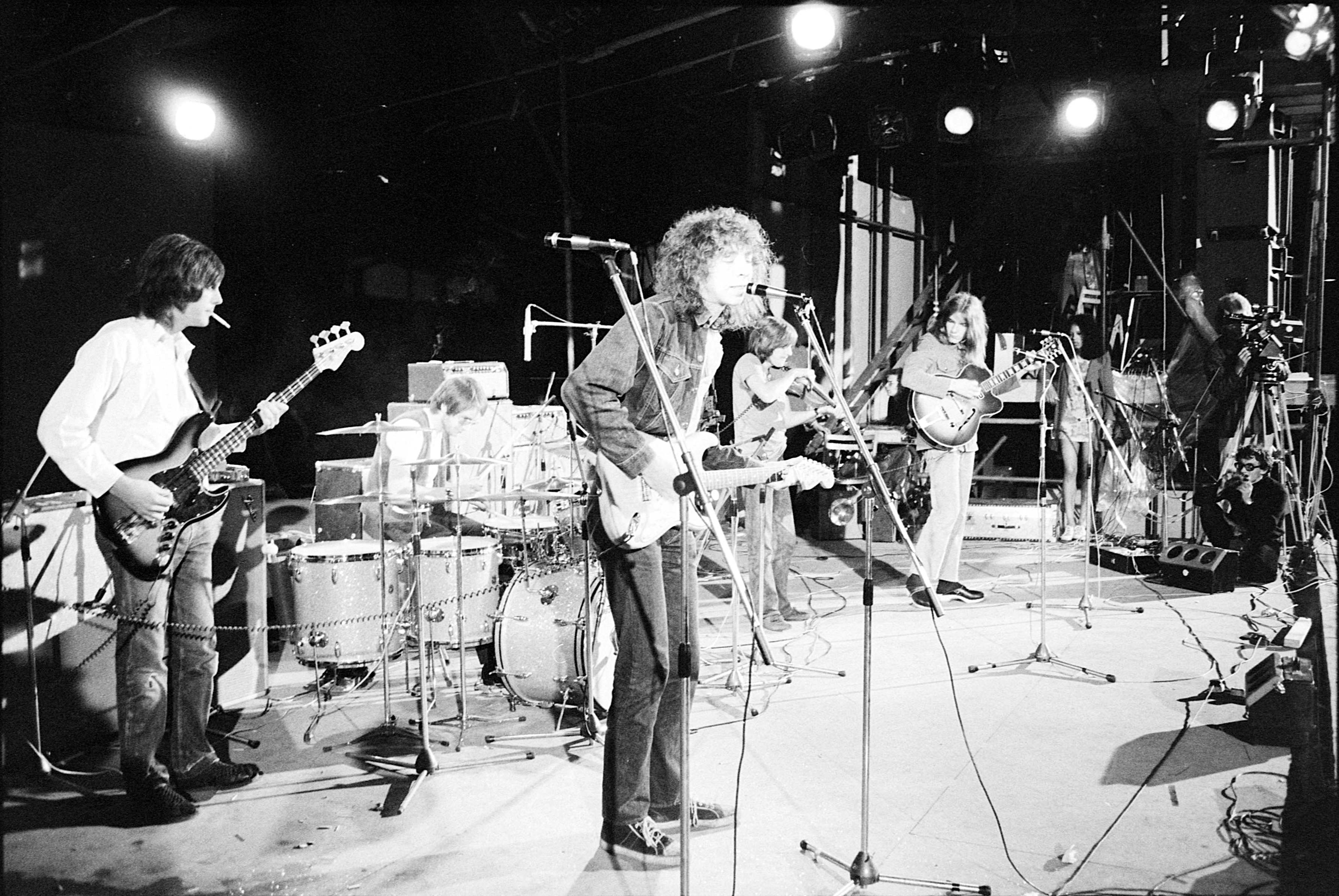
Mattacks with Fairport Convention, 1970

He replaced Martin Lamble, who had died on 12 May 1969 in a road accident on the M1 motorway, as the drummer for Fairport Convention. Mattacks left Fairport Convention in early 1972 to join The Albion Country Band. Meanwhile, he had also contributed to numerous studio recordings such as the Morris On project, Nick Drake's Bryter Layter, Steve Ashley's "Stroll On" sessions, Steeleye Span's debut album Hark! The Village Wait, John Martyn's Solid Air and Harvey Andrews' album Writer of Songs. He returned to Fairport Convention in order to help complete the 1973 album Rosie with a revamped line up of the band.

Mattacks also played on Nine (1974) but left halfway through the making of the follow-up Rising for the Moon, following an altercation with engineer Glyn Johns. Some of Mattacks' most notable participation in studio recordings in the late 1970s are the work on art rock studio albums by Brian Eno (Before and After Science) and 801's Listen Now, as well as several Ashley Hutchings-related folk rock projects (The Compleat Dancing Master, Son of Morris On etc.).

When Fairport Convention re-formed in 1985 after a six-year absence, Mattacks was recruited as drummer. He had already been playing with them again during annual reunions at the fledgling Cropredy Festival. Mattacks remained with Fairport until 1997. He has rejoined them on occasion, such as at Cropredy in 2019, to celebrate the 50th anniversary of the release of Liege & Lief.

Mattacks returned to Fairport Convention on a part-time basis in 2023 following Gerry Conway's retirement.

== Other works ==
He began as a trainee piano-tuner before taking up the drums. He played with several jazz bands before joining Fairport Convention.

Mattacks has also worked both as a session musician and as a performing artist. Apart from playing the drums, he is also a proficient keyboard player and occasionally played the bass guitar on studio recordings.

He also established himself as a touring drummer for Richard Thompson, playing on several of Thompson's studio albums.

== Personal life ==
Mattacks was born in Edgware, Middlesex, England.

In 1998, he moved to Marblehead, Massachusetts, United States, where he is a sought-after studio musician, record producer, and member of the band Super Genius, while still touring regularly with various acts in the United Kingdom, Europe and Australia.

== Other collaborations ==
=== Has toured with ===
- Grey DeLisle
- Rosanne Cash

=== Has recorded with ===
- Steve Ashley
- Judith Durham
- Michael Chapman
- Mike Heron
- The Incredible String Band
- Elton John (Ice on Fire, Leather Jackets)
- XTC
- Paul McCartney (Tug of War, Pipes of Peace, Flowers in the Dirt, Run Devil Run)
- George Harrison (Somewhere in England, Gone Troppo)
- Kilburn and the High Roads (Handsome)
- Cat Stevens (Back to Earth)
- Loudon Wainwright III
- Mary Chapin Carpenter (A Place in the World, Time* Sex* Love*)
- Brian Eno
- Alison Moyet
- Murray Head (Voices)
- Martin Phillipps
- Joan Armatrading (Joan Armatrading, The Shouting Stage)
- Jimmy Page
- The Proclaimers
- Gary Brooker
- Elkie Brooks (Pearls II)
- Nick Drake
- Nick Heyward (North of a Miracle)
- Mitch Winston
- Liane Carroll
- Sandy Denny
- Super Genius
- Four Piece Suit
- Barbara Dickson
- The Happy Kenneths
- The Barron Knights
- Beverley Craven (Beverley Craven)
- Sebastian Santa Maria
- Shelagh McDonald
- Shirley Collins
- Kajagoogoo
- Spirogyra
- Bill Nelson's Red Noise
- Brooks Williams
- Ayuo
- Debra Cowan
- Michael Wang
- Elaine O'Rourke
- The Dream Academy
- Sally Oldfield (Easy)
- Phil Manzanera
- Steve Harley (Yes You Can)
- Jon Shain
- John Martyn
- Camel
- Chris de Burgh
- Matthew Fisher
- Mary Ann Redmond
- Chris Spedding
- The Bar-Steward Sons of Val Doonican
- Peter Green (Little Dreamer)
- Mary Timony

=== Has toured and recorded with ===
- Kate & Anna McGarrigle
- Chris Rea
- Ralph McTell
- The Chills
- Mickey Jupp
- Everything but the Girl
- Richard Thompson
- Georgie Fame
- Jethro Tull
- Ashley Hutchings
- The Albion Band
- Steeleye Span
- Feast of Fiddles
- Jimmy Page (Death Wish II)
- Judith Owen
- Nick Heyward
- Andy Fairweather Low (La Booga Rooga)
