= It's Sandy Denny =

- Rerelease as Where the Time Goes

Compilation album by Sandy Denny
- Released: 1970
- Recorded: 22 March, 26 April 1967, London
- Genre: Folk rock
- Label: Saga (EROS8153)
- Producer: Marcel Rodd

Sandy Denny chronology
Fotheringay (1970)	It's Sandy Denny (1970)	The North Star Grassman and the Ravens (1971)

It's Sandy Denny is a compilation album, issued in 1970. It consists of songs Sandy Denny recorded for Saga Records in 1967, and which were initially released on two separate albums: Alex Campbell and his Friends (Saga EROS8021) and Sandy and Johnny (Saga EROS8041).

Alex Campbell and his Friends featured Alex Campbell with Sandy Denny, Johnny Silvo, Paul McNeill and Cliff Aungier, and was recorded March 1967. Sandy and Johnny featured separate tracks from Sandy and Johnny Silvo, and was recorded a month later.

== Tracks ==
Side 1

1. "This Train" (Traditional; arranged by A. Johnson)
2. "The 3.10 to Yuma" (George Duning, Ned Washington)
3. "Pretty Polly" (Traditional; arranged by A. Johnson)
4. "You Never Wanted Me" (Jackson C. Frank)
5. "Milk and Honey" (Jackson C. Frank)

SIDE 2

1. "My Ramblin' Boy" (Tom Paxton)
2. The Last Thing on My Mind" (Tom Paxton)
3. "Make Me a Pallet On Your Floor" (Traditional; arranged by A. Johnson)
4. "The False Bride" (Traditional; arranged by A. Johnson)
5. "Been on the Road So Long" (Alex Campbell: lead vocals, Denny: backing vocals)

== Reissues ==
The album was reissued in 1978 on the Mooncrest label with the title The Original Sandy Denny.

The songs have most recently been re-released in 2005 as Where the Time Goes - Sandy '67 (Castle Music CMRCD1181) including additional alternate takes of "3.10 To Yuma", "Pretty Polly", "Milk and Honey", "The Last Thing On My Mind", "Make Me a Pallet on the Floor" and "Been on the Road So Long". Additionally, this version opens with Sandy's solo version of Who Knows Where the Time Goes? first released on the Strawbs album All Our Own Work in 1973. This album was actually the Strawbs first recordings from 1967 but not released at the time.
