= The 3:10 to Yuma =

1957 song by Frankie Laine

Single by Frankie Laine
- B-side: "You Know How It Is"
- Released: 1957
- Label: Columbia Records
- Songwriter(s): George Duning, Ned Washington

Frankie Laine singles chronology
"Lonely Man" (1957)	"The 3:10 to Yuma" (1957)	"Good Evening Friends" (1957)

"The 3:10 to Yuma"

Song by Sandy Denny

from the album Sandy and Johnny
- Released: 1967
- Recorded: 26 April 1967
- Label: Saga Records EROS8041
- Songwriter(s): George Duning, Ned Washington

"The 3:10 to Yuma" is a folk song written by George Duning (music) and Ned Washington (lyrics) and sung by Frankie Laine as the theme song to the 1957 film 3:10 to Yuma.

There were two sets of lyrics recorded by Laine. The version used as the film theme is western-themed, mentioning buzzards, fate, and the ghosts of outlaws, and a later version describing the singer wanting to take that train again in the hope of meeting a woman he had seen on it previously.

== Sandy Denny and Johnny Silvo ==
A version was recorded by Sandy Denny and Johnny Silvo in 1967 but it was only loosely based on that first version sung in the film. The first line, "There is a lonely train called the 3:10 to "Yuma", is the only obvious aspect that the two songs have in common. Its lyrics reflect more generally on human existence as a whole, as suggested in the line "They say the life of man is made up of four seasons".

The song is built up around four basic verses. The first, coming after a brief intro on the guitar, reflects on the eponymous train, the 3:10 to Yuma. The narrator intends to ride this train, indicating that it will be her final journey.

The next two verses feature the narrator apparently reflecting on her past life and human existence as a whole, comparing it to the progress of one year. During the third verse in particular, the narrator compares the final stage of a man's life to a winter, with death compared with "walking into the rain". This is followed by the enigmatic line "But the rains of death never fall from the cloudless skies of Yuma". The first verse is then repeated.

A French version of the song recorded the same year also exists: "Je ne crains rien" by John William.

On the Sandy Denny version, aside from vocals, the song features a lead guitar and a double bass. The bass plays a regular rhythm of a quarter note followed by two eighth notes throughout the song. Meanwhile, the vocals and rhythm are complemented by a freely played melody on the acoustic lead guitar.

The song was initially released on the Saga Records album Sandy and Johnny in 1967. It was later reissued in 1970 on the Saga Records compilation It's Sandy Denny that has been rereleased under various titles such as Where the Time Goes, Sandy Denny, or The Original Sandy Denny.

== See also ==
- List of train songs
