= René Köhler =

Fictional person

René Köhler was a spurious conductor invented by William Barrington-Coupe as part of a fraud scheme in which he passed off numerous plagiarised copyrighted sound recordings of several classical pianists as the work of his wife, Joyce Hatto.

== False biography ==
William Barrington-Coupe provided a fictional biography of the non-existent Köhler (allegedly born in 1926 and dying in 2002) to Ateş Orga in which he claimed that Köhler had been a piano pupil of Raoul Koczalski. He was said to have been unable to study at the Polish Conservatoire in Warsaw because of his Jewish faith. Instead he was said to have taken private lessons with Stanisław Spinalski. In 1940, according to the biography provided by Barrington-Coupe, his left hand was crushed irreparably by a young German officer. According to Barrington-Coupe, he survived the Warsaw Ghetto but in the summer of 1942 was deported to Treblinka concentration camp which he survived – one of fewer than a hundred to do so.

From 1945 to 1970, Barrington-Coupe claimed, Köhler was a prisoner in the Soviet Union.

== Role in Joyce Hatto affair ==
Barrington-Coupe issued several recordings of piano music which, he claimed, featured Hatto as the pianist. It is now known that these recordings actually feature the published commercial recordings of other pianists, in some cases digitally manipulated. For those recordings that featured an orchestral accompaniment, Barrington-Coupe credited Köhler as the conductor, allegedly directing the spurious "National Philharmonic-Symphony" and "Warsaw Philharmonia" orchestras.

There is no reason to believe that any such person existed. Details of the biography resemble that of the conductor and composer Stanisław Skrowaczewski, who was born in Poland, had originally trained and performed as a pianist, but suffered from a hand injury during World War II which left him unable to play.
