= Loving Miss Hatto =

2012 British TV biopic programme

- Genre: Drama
- Screenplay by: Victoria Wood
- Directed by: Aisling Walsh
- Starring: Francesca Annis; Alfred Molina
- Theme music composer: Niall Byrne
- Country of origin: United Kingdom
- Original language: English

Production
- Executive producers: Charles Elton; Andy Harries; Victoria Wood
- Producer: Radford Neville
- Cinematography: Martin Fuhrer
- Editor: Alex Mackie
- Running time: 90 minutes
- Production company: Left Bank Pictures

Original release
- Network: BBC One
- Release: 23 December 2012

Loving Miss Hatto is a 2012 British television film directed by Aisling Walsh and starring Maimie McCoy and Francesca Annis as Joyce Hatto and Rory Kinnear and Alfred Molina as William Barrington-Coupe.

== Plot ==
Pianist Joyce Hatto became famous very late in life when unauthorised copies of commercial recordings made by other pianists were released under her name, earning her high praise from critics. The fraud did not come to light until 2007, six months after her death. The film takes a look at two distinct periods of time, firstly the beginning of Joyce's career when she met and married Barrington-Coupe and secondly, with a change of actors, some thirty years later her later life with her husband, her career, illness and death.

== Production and broadcast ==
Loving Miss Hatto was filmed in Ireland and screened on BBC Television on 23 December 2012. The screenplay was by Victoria Wood and the film was made by Left Bank Pictures. Barrington-Coupe was still alive at the time, but Wood stated in an interview with The Guardian that she did not consult him when she was writing the film, although members of the research team for the project met with him on a number of occasions.

== Cast ==
- Francesca Annis as Joyce Hatto
- Alfred Molina as William Barrington-Coupe
- Maimie McCoy as Young Joyce
- Rory Kinnear as Young Barrie
- Phoebe Nicholls as Mrs Hatto
- Ned Dennehy as Philip
- Sarah Woodward as Birdy
- Eve Matheson as Pilks
- Jane Brennan as Miss Guisely
- Ned Dennehy as Philip
- Nicholas Rowe as James
- Nicholas Woodeson as Erich
- Nell Williams as Young Birdy
- Susan Loughnane as Publishing girl
- Valerie O'Connor as Phylis

== Home media ==
The film was made available on Amazon Prime.
