= Sandy and Johnny =

Studio album by Sandy Denny and Johnny Silvo
- Released: 1967
- Recorded: 22 March and 26 April 1967
- Genre: Folk music
- Label: Saga EROS 8041

Sandy Denny chronology
Alex Campbell and His Friends (1967)	Sandy and Johnny (1967)	What We Did on Our Holidays (1969)

Sandy and Johnny is a split album featuring early recordings by Sandy Denny and Johnny Silvo, recorded for Saga Records in 1967. Despite being credited to both singers, the album consists of solo songs by each.

== Background ==
For a time in 1967, Denny was a member of the Johnny Silvo Folk Four, and this album arose from that; however, Allmusic's Richie Unterberger have stated that the "simple folk arrangements ... are often old-fashioned and outmoded".

== Track listing ==
=== Side one ===
1. Sandy Denny: "Milk and Honey" (Jackson C. Frank)
2. Johnny Silvo: "I Wish I Could Shimmy Like My Sister Kate"
3. Sandy Denny: "The Last Thing on My Mind" (Tom Paxton)
4. Johnny Silvo: "Ol' Man Mose"
5. Sandy Denny: "The 3:10 to Yuma" (George Duning, Ned Washington)
6. Johnny Silvo: "Black Girl"

=== Side two ===
1. Sandy Denny: "Make Me a Pallet on Your Floor" (Trad. arr. A. Johnson)
2. Johnny Silvo: "Nobody Knows You When You're Down and Out"
3. Sandy Denny: "Pretty Polly" (Trad. arr. A. Johnson)
4. Johnny Silvo: "Take This Hammer"
5. Sandy Denny: "Been on the Road So Long" (Alex Campbell)
6. Johnny Silvo: "To Hear My Mother Pray"

== Personnel ==
- Sandy Denny - guitar, vocals
- Johnny Silvo - guitar, vocals
- David Moses - double bass
