= Matsuzawa =

Matsuzawa (written: 松沢 or 松澤 lit. "pine tree swamp") is a Japanese surname. Notable people with the surname include:

- Hatsuho Matsuzawa (松沢 初穂; 1914–2011), Japanese swimmer
- Kansei Matsuzawa (born 1999), Japanese player of American football
- Shigefumi Matsuzawa (松沢 成文; born 1958), Japanese politician
- Tetsuro Matsuzawa (松沢 哲郎; born 1950), Japanese primatologist
- Yuki Matsuzawa (born 1960), Japanese classical pianist
- Yumi Matsuzawa (松澤 由美; born 1974), Japanese singer
