= James Inverne =

British journalist (born 1975)

James Inverne (born 1975) is an English cultural critic and commentator, specialising in theatre, opera and classical music, and film. He is also an artist manager and consultant for leading classical musicians, a playwright and novelist.

== Career ==
Inverne worked as European Performing Arts Correspondent for Time (2000–2005), and as arts editor for the cable TV arts channel Performance.

Inverne was editor of Gramophone magazine from November 2005 to 2011, where he won the Press Gazette prize for Exclusive of the Year for the magazine's exposing of the Joyce Hatto recordings fraud.

Inverne is a columnist for The Jewish Chronicle newspaper. In an interview in The Jewish Chronicle, Simon Round compared Inverne to impresario Simon Cowell: "both have the ability to help make the careers of aspiring musicians."

Inverne was the founder and editor of Inside Sundance Institute, an award-winning magazine created for Robert Redford's Utah-based organisation. He is also a founder and director of the not-for-profit cultural interfaith organisation (created after the 2005 London transport bombings) Inter-Act.

Inverne's work has been published in the Wall Street Journal, The Times, the Sunday Telegraph, the Mail On Sunday and the Financial Times.

In 2012 Inverne announced the formation of an artist management and PR company, "Inverne Price Music Consultancy". Initial clients included the pianist Lang Lang, violist David Aaron Carpenter, conductor John Axelrod, soprano Teodora Gheorghiu, and violinists Alexandre Da Costa and Mark O'Connor among others. In 2016 the company rebranded as James Inverne Music Consultancy. Clients included the Aspen Music Festival and School, pianist Mark Bebbington, soprano Sarah Fox, violinist Pavel Sporcl, Carnegie Hall and others. He co-founded and curated the International Concerts Series at Central Synagogue in London. He also took on a role for Delfont Mackintosh Theatres, as editorial director for Sir Cameron Mackintosh on the programs for Mackintosh's seven West End theatres. In 2015/16 he edited the official 125th anniversary magazine for Carnegie Hall.

Inverne appears as a character in the 2012 Victoria Wood-scripted drama Loving Miss Hatto, a film about the Joyce Hatto scandal, screened on BBC One television over the Christmas 2012 period. In 2015, Inverne announced that, alongside his other activities, he was developing his new play for production. The play, entitled A Walk With Mr. Heifetz was selected for a work-in-progress semi-staged reading at the 2017 Jewish Book Week festival, where it was performed in March 2017 to a sold-out audience at King's Place in London, featuring actors Henry Goodman, Ed Stoppard and Yuval Boim, directed by Benjamin Kamine. It was announced that A Walk With Mr Heifetz would be produced off-Broadway, in January 2018, by the award-winning New York theatre company Primary Stages at the Cherry Lane Theatre. Performances were announced from January 29, 2018, to March 4, 2018. Following that successful run, Inverne announced that his second play was being developed for production.

During the 2020 COVID-19 crisis, an audio recording of A Walk With Mr Heifetz was released, including actors Yuval Boim, Ed Stoppard and Richard Topol, and violinist Mariella Haubs. The recording was made to benefit charities the America-Israel Cultural Foundation, and Meir Panim. Haaretz, reviewing the recording, called the play "delicate...and daring."

Inverne's screenplays have included the docu-features Renee Fleming's Cities That Sing for IMAX Entertainment.

In February 2025 it was announced that a new play, That Bastard, Puccini! would receive its world premiere production at the Park Theatre in London, opening in July 2025.

Inverne's first novel, The Inspired, was published in March 2026.

== Bibliography ==
- James Inverne. Jack Tinker, A Life In Review. Absolute Classics, 1997.
- James Inverne. The Impresarios. Oberon Books, 2000.
- James Inverne. Wrestling With Elephants – the authorised biography of Don Black. Sanctuary Publishing, 2003.
- James Inverne. Inverne's Stage and Screen Trivia. Sanctuary Publishing, 2004.
- James Inverne. The Faber Pocket Guide To Musicals. Faber & Faber, 2009.
- James Inverne, The Inspired. JIMC Books, 2026.
