= Lynne Sharon Schwartz =

American prose and poetry writer (born 1939)

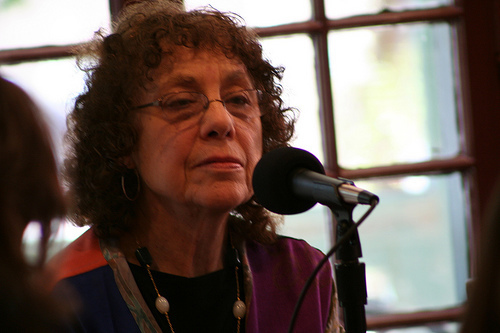
- Born: March 19, 1939 (age 87)
- Education: Barnard College (BA); Bryn Mawr College (MA); New York University
- Occupation: Writer
- Spouse: Harry Schwartz (m. 1957)
- Parent(s): Jack M. Sharon; Sarah Slatus Sharon

Lynne Sharon Schwartz (born March 19, 1939) is an American prose and poetry writer.

== Biography ==
Schwartz grew up in Brooklyn, the second of three children of Jack M. Sharon, a lawyer and accountant, and Sarah Slatus Sharon; she married Harry Schwartz in 1957. She holds a BA (1959) from Barnard College, an MA (1961) from Bryn Mawr, and started work on a PhD at NYU. Schwartz has taught in many universities and writing programs, including Bryn Mawr, Columbia University, the University of Michigan, Washington University in St. Louis, Rice University, and the University of Iowa Writers' Workshop. She is currently on faculty in the Writing Seminars MFA program at Bennington College. Lynne Sharon Schwartz lives in New York City, and has set a number of her books there as well. Though Schwartz is perhaps best known for her novels, her work spans a number of genres, from fiction to poetry to memoir, criticism, and translation from Italian.

== Selected works ==
- Crossing Borders (Seven Stories Press, 2018)
- Two-Part Inventions (Counterpoint, 2012), a novel based on the story of Joyce Hatto and William Barrington-Coupe
- The Emergence of Memory: Conversations With W.G. Sebald (Seven Stories Press, 2007)
- The Writing on the Wall: A Novel (Counterpoint, 2005)
- Referred Pain and Other Stories (Counterpoint Press, 2004)
- In Solitary: Poems (Sheep Meadow, 2002)
- Face to Face: A Reader in the World (Beacon Press, 2000)
- In the Family Way: an Urban Comedy (William Morrow, 1999)
- Ruined by Reading: A Life in Books (Beacon Press, 1996)
- The Fatigue Artist (Scribner, 1995)
- The Four Questions (Picture Puffins, 1994)
- Leaving Brooklyn (Houghton Mifflin, 1989)
- We are talking about homes: A great university against its neighbors (Harper & Row, 1985)
- Disturbances in the Field (HarperCollins, 1983)
- Balancing Acts (HarperCollins, 1981)
- Rough Strife (HarperCollins, 1980)
- See You In The Dark, a poetry collection
- Not Now, Voyager, a memoir
