= Joyce Hatto =

English pianist (1928–2006)

A publicity photograph of Joyce Hatto

Joyce Hilda Hatto (5 September 1928 – 29 June 2006) was an English concert pianist and piano teacher. In 1956 she married William Barrington-Coupe, a record producer who was convicted of Purchase Tax evasion in 1966. Hatto became famous very late in life when unauthorised copies of commercial recordings made by other pianists were released under her name, resulting in high praise from critics. The fraud did not come to light until 2007, more than six months after her death.

== Early life and early career ==
Joyce Hatto was born in St John's Wood, London. Her father was an antique dealer and piano enthusiast. As a promising young professional, she played at a large number of concerts in London, and throughout Britain and Europe, beginning in the 1950s. There were concertos in which she was accompanied by the Boyd Neel, Haydn and London Symphony Orchestras, and many others; solo recitals at the Wigmore Hall, the Queen Elizabeth Hall and elsewhere; and concerts by "pupils of Joyce Hatto" in the late 1960s and early 1970s. She supplemented her earnings with work as a répétiteur for the London Philharmonic Choir under such conductors as Thomas Beecham and Victor de Sabata, and as a piano teacher, both privately and at schools including Crofton Grange, a girls' boarding school in Hertfordshire, where her pupils included the novelist Rose Tremain. She was also active in the recording studios for several companies such as Saga Records in England, as well as others in Hamburg and Paris.

== Critical reception ==
Hatto's playing drew mixed notices from the critics. A critic for The Times wrote of a performance at Chelsea Town Hall in October 1953 that "Joyce Hatto grappled doggedly with too hasty tempi in Mozart's D minor piano concerto and was impeded from conveying significant feelings towards the work, especially in quick figuration." Trevor Harvey wrote of her Saga recording of Rachmaninoff's Piano Concerto No. 2 "one wonders ... whether her technique is really on top of the difficulties of this music ... She shows a musical sense of give and take with the orchestra but it remains a small, rather pallid performance" (The Gramophone, August 1961).

Vernon Handley, who conducted the Guildford Philharmonic on Hatto's 1970 recording of Sir Arnold Bax's Symphonic Variations for her husband's Revolution label, said; "[a]s a solo pianist, she was absolutely marvellous. She had ten wonderful fingers and she could get round anything and also she was an extraordinarily charming person to work with, even if she could be very difficult." In another interview, after the 2007 hoax perpetrated by her husband had been revealed, he added; "[s]he had a very doubtful sense of rhythm ... [t]he recording of the Bax was a tremendous labour." Still the record received a favourable review: "Joyce Hatto gives a highly commendable account of the demanding piano part," wrote Robert Layton (Gramophone, February 1971).

In 1973 Hatto gave the world premiere of two recently published Bourrées by Frédéric Chopin in London's Queen Elizabeth Hall. In 1976 she stopped performing in public and moved to Royston, Hertfordshire. It was later claimed that she already had cancer at the time. However, the consultant radiologist who saw her every six weeks for the last eight years of her life stated that she was first treated for ovarian cancer in 1992, fourteen years before her death, and had had no previous history of the disease.

== Fraud ==
In Hatto's last years more than 100 recordings falsely attributed to her appeared. The repertoire represented on the CDs included the complete sonatas of Beethoven, Mozart and Prokofiev, concertos by Rachmaninoff, Tchaikovsky, Brahms and Mendelssohn and most of Chopin's compositions, along with rarer works such as the complete Godowsky Studies on Chopin's Études. The recordings were released, along with piano recordings falsely attributed to Sergio Fiorentino, by the Concert Artist Recordings label run by Hatto's husband William Barrington-Coupe, who had a long history in the record industry. The critic Neville Cardus had been dazzled by her playing, according to a story found in one obituary.

From 2003 onwards the recordings attributed to Hatto began to receive enthusiastic praise from a small number of participants on various Usenet groups, mailing lists and web forums, sparked by a blind-listening test in December 2002 posted on ThePiano Yahoo! group featuring a recording under Hatto's name of Liszt's Mephisto Waltz. Specialised record review magazines and websites such as Gramophone, MusicWeb and Classics Today, as well as newspapers such as The Boston Globe, eventually discovered Hatto, reviewed the recordings (with mostly very favourable notices) and published interviews and appreciations of her career; in one case, she was described as "the greatest living pianist that almost no one has ever heard of." Those praising the recordings included Tom Deacon, a former record producer for Philips, who produced that label's Great Pianists of the 20th Century series and was so fooled he praised and derided the same recording, thinking that one was by Hatto and the other by Yuki Matsuzawa; Bryce Morrison, a long-time reviewer for Gramophone; Jed Distler, a reviewer for Gramophone and Classics Today; Ateş Orga, a music critic who also wrote some of the liner notes for Concert Artist, as well as an obituary; and Ivan Davis, a professional pianist.

In May 2005 the musicologist Marc-André Roberge reported on the Yahoo! Godowsky group that, in Hatto's version of the Chopin-Godowsky Studies on the Concert Artist label, a misreading of a chord was identical to one on the Carlo Grante recording (AIR-CD-9092, released 1993). However this coincidence did not prompt Roberge or others to investigate further at that time and verification of the copying from the Grante disc would only occur in 2007.

In early 2006 doubts about various aspects of Hatto's recording output were expressed, both in the rec.music.classical.recordings Usenet group and, following the publication of a lengthy appreciation of Hatto in the March issue of Gramophone, by readers of that magazine. In particular, some found it hard to believe that a pianist who had not performed in public for decades and was said to be fighting cancer should produce in her old age a large number of recordings, all apparently of high quality. It also proved difficult to confirm any of the details of the recordings made with orchestra, including even the existence of René Köhler, the conductor credited. The doubters were vigorously countered, most publicly by critic Jeremy Nicholas who in the July 2006 issue of Gramophone, challenged unnamed sceptics to substantiate their accusations by providing evidence that would "stand up in a court of law". Nicholas's challenge was not taken up and in December Radio New Zealand was able, in all innocence, to re-broadcast its hour-long programme of glowing appreciation of the Concert Artist Hatto CDs. This programme included excerpts from a telephone interview with Hatto herself, conducted on 6 April 2006, in which she said nothing to dispel the presenter's assumption that she was the sole pianist on all the CDs.

The favourable reviews and publicity generated substantial sales for the Concert Artist CDs: in 2006, one online retailer did £50,000 worth of business with Barrington-Coupe. Barrington-Coupe himself claimed to have sold 3,051 Hatto CDs in 2005 and 2006, and 5,500 from 2007 up to February 2009, and that he had made a "thumping great loss" on them.

== Death ==
Hatto died from ovarian cancer and deep vein thrombosis, aged 77, at her home in Royston, Hertfordshire, on 29 June 2006. Her remains were cremated in Cambridge on 11 July 2006.

== Revelation of fraud ==
When Brian Ventura, a financial analyst from Mount Vernon, New York, put the recording of Liszt's Transcendental Études credited to Hatto into his computer, the Gracenote database used by the iTunes software identified the disc as being one made by László Simon, not Joyce Hatto. On checking online samples of the Simon recording Ventura found it to be remarkably similar to the version credited to Hatto. He then contacted Jed Distler, a critic for Classics Today and Gramophone, who had praised many of the recordings ascribed to Hatto.

Distler later wrote:

When I received Brian Ventura's e-mail I decided to investigate further. After careful comparison of the actual Simon performances to the Hatto, it appeared to me that 10 out of 12 tracks showed remarkable similarity in terms of tempi, accents, dynamics, balances, etc. By contrast, Track Five, Feux Follets, sounded different between the two sources. I reported my findings to Mr. Ventura, and cc'd Classicstoday.com editor David Hurwitz. I also cc'd Gramophone's editor James Inverne, plus three of my Gramophone colleagues who had written about Hatto. Then I wrote Mr. Barrington-Coupe. He quickly replied, claiming not to know what had happened, and to be as puzzled as I was. At James Inverne's suggestion, Andrew Rose [of the audio-restoration business Pristine Audio] contacted me, and I uploaded three MP3s from the Hatto Liszt disc. Andrew's research confirmed what my ears suspected: at least two Liszt tracks were identical between BIS and Concert Artist, while at least one was not.

An identification of the source of another recording, which had been in preparation for some months, was released the following day by the AHRC Research Centre for the History and Analysis of Recorded Music (CHARM, based at Royal Holloway, University of London) as a by-product of research on performances of Chopin Mazurkas.

The editor of Gramophone, James Inverne, commissioned an intensive investigation of the Hatto CDs by audio experts including Andrew Rose. In February 2007 the magazine published a series of articles in the print edition and on the magazine's website showing that a number of the CDs ascribed to Hatto were recordings made by other pianists. In some cases these recordings had been digitally manipulated by methods such as speeding them up or slowing them, changing the equalisation or the recording balance. While some of these artists were well-known, the majority were not. Within a week of the initial story being posted on the Gramophone website on 15 February, the sources for some 20 of Hatto's Concert Artist CDs had been identified.

On each of the concerto recordings published in Hatto's final years under her name the conductor's name was given as "René Köhler", and Barrington-Coupe provided a detailed biography for "Köhler". The information given there has not withstood careful scrutiny. The conductors whose work is represented on the concerto recordings credited to Hatto and Köhler are now known to include Esa-Pekka Salonen, André Previn and Bernard Haitink, while the orchestras, claimed to be the National Philharmonic-Symphony and the Warsaw Philharmonia, are now known to include the Vienna Philharmonic, the Philharmonia, and the Royal Philharmonic.

== Admission of fraud ==
Barrington-Coupe initially denied any wrongdoing but subsequently admitted the fraud in a letter to Robert von Bahr, the head of the Swedish record label BIS, which had originally issued some of the recordings plagiarised by Concert Artists. Bahr shared the contents of the letter with Gramophone, which reported the confession on its website on 26 February 2007. Barrington-Coupe claims that Hatto was unaware of the deception, that she would hear the final recordings believing that they were all her own work, that he acted out of love, that he made little money from the enterprise and that he started out by pasting portions of other pianists' recordings into recordings made by Hatto to cover up her gasps of pain. Some critics however have cast doubt on this version of events, not least James Inverne in Gramophone.

The discovery of plagiarised tracks on a Concert Artist CD released under the name of pianist Sergio Fiorentino raised further questions. Barrington-Coupe refused to help identify the sources of the recordings issued under Hatto's name, claiming that "whatever I do, it won't be enough".

== Aftermath ==
The British Phonographic Industry (BPI) announced an investigation. According to a BPI spokesman in 2007, if the allegations were true, it would have been "one of the most extraordinary cases of piracy the record industry had ever seen".

Robert von Bahr of the BIS label said that he "had given a lot of thought" to suing Barrington-Coupe for damages but was inclined not to do so on the assumption that the hoax recordings were "a desperate attempt to build a shrine to a dying wife". He also said that he had advised László Simon to take advantage of the publicity by securing more concert engagements.

Barrington-Coupe himself said that he "had given up worrying" about possible legal consequences and added that "I don't consider I've hurt anybody. A lot of attention has been drawn to forgotten artists."

The Hertfordshire Constabulary said that it would not take any action unless a complaint was made by the copyright holder of one of the original recordings. This did not occur.

In 2009 Channel 4 in Britain broadcast a 20-minute documentary about the scam.

Barrington-Coupe died aged 83, at his home in Royston, on 19 October 2014.

== TV film ==
A TV film, Loving Miss Hatto, was filmed in Ireland and screened on BBC Television on 23 December 2012. The screenplay was by Victoria Wood and the film was made by Left Bank Pictures. Hatto was portrayed by Maimie McCoy and Francesca Annis. Rory Kinnear and Alfred Molina played her husband. Barrington-Coupe was still alive at the time, but Wood stated in an interview with The Guardian that she did not consult him when she was writing the screenplay, although members of the research team for the project had met with him on a number of occasions.

== In literature ==
Hatto's story inspired a novel by the French-Vietnamese author Minh Tran Huy, La Double vie d'Anna Song ("The double life of Anna Song"). Anna Song, described as "the greatest pianist that no one has heard of", appears to record a huge discography despite illness and old age. Her husband, Paul Desroches, acts as producer for the recordings. It is later revealed in a magazine that the recordings are not the work of Song, but have been stolen by her husband from the work of others.

Another novel drawn from the Hatto case is Lynne Sharon Schwartz's Two-Part Inventions (2012). Schwartz has stated that her novel is directly based on the story of Hatto and Barrington-Coupe.

== Recordings and their sources ==
The following is a list of some of the performances attributed to Hatto whose sources have so far been discovered (sorted by Concert Artist catalogue number). More detailed track by track information can be found at the Joyce Hatto Identifications website.

Catalogue no.	Recording	Sources
CACD 20012	Frédéric Chopin; Mazurkas	Revealed as Eugen Indjic's 1988 performances released on the Claves label and re-released on Calliope (3321) in 2005. The number of Mazurkas on both CD sets is the same, but the ordering of them is different. The CACD20012 release has added filtering, and the speeds of each performance pair vary slightly in the range of a few percent (+1.2%, -2.8%, and −0.7% for three sample Mazurkas). A cassette version of the Mazurkas released in 1993 was also taken at least in part from Indjic.
CACD 20022	Leopold Godowsky; Studies on Chopin's Études	Tracks 1 and 14 are from the recording by Ian Hobson on Arabesque (Z6537). Tracks 2, 4–13, 16, 18, 22, and 23 are from the recording by Carlo Grante on Altarus. Tracks 3, 15, 17, 19–21, and 24–27 are from Marc-André Hamelin's recording on Hyperion.
CACD 20032	Olivier Messiaen; Vingt regards sur l'enfant-Jésus	A copy of a performance by Paul Kim, recorded for Centaur in January 2002, time-stretched (slowed down) by 2.4%.
CACD 20042	Maurice Ravel; Complete Piano Music	Found to be a copy of a CD release by Roger Muraro on the Accord label (Universal Classics France), recorded in May 2003.
CACD 80002	Johannes Brahms; Piano Concerto No. 1, No.2, Rhapsodies, Op.79, Rhapsody Op.119 No.4.	Piano Concerto No. 1 copied from a performance by Horacio Gutiérrez with the Royal Philharmonic Orchestra conducted by André Previn on Telarc. The same recording appears to be the source for the cassette recording of a performance of the concerto credited to Hatto (FED4-TC-098), dated 1994.
CACD 80012	Johannes Brahms; Piano Concerto No. 2, Klavierstücke Op.118	Piano Concerto No. 2 copied from a performance by Vladimir Ashkenazy with the Vienna Philharmonic conducted by Bernard Haitink on Decca. Of the 6 pieces, Op.118, Nos.1, 2, 3, & 6 are performed by Dezső Ránki, from his recording on Harmonia Mundi (QUI 903083).
CACD 80022	Ludwig van Beethoven; Piano Sonatas, Op. 2	Taken from the recording by John O'Conor on Telarc. At least 25 of the sonatas in the series come from O'Conor's recording.
CACD 80092	Ludwig van Beethoven; Piano Sonatas Opp. 7, 106	Taken from the recording by John O'Conor on Telarc.
CACD 80102	Ludwig van Beethoven; Piano Sonatas Nos. 30–32	Taken from the recording by John O'Conor on Telarc (CD80261).
CACD 90302; 90312	Johannes Brahms; Complete Piano Works Vols. 4 & 5	Scherzo, Op. 4, Ballades, Op.10 Nos. 1, 2, 3, Op. 118 Nos. 3 & 6, Op. 119 Nos. 3 & 4 taken from Dezső Ránki's recording on Harmonia Mundi (QUI 903083).
CACD 90382	Frédéric Chopin; Complete Piano Works, Vol.4: The Ballades and Rondos	Rondos taken from the recording by Joanna Trzeciak on Pavane (ADW 7291)
CACD 90422	Frédéric Chopin; Complete Piano Works, Vol.7: The Waltzes 1–20	Waltz No. 20 in F sharp minor comes from the Jerzy Sterczynski CD on Selene.
CACD 90432	Frédéric Chopin; Complete Piano Works, Vol.8: The Three Piano Sonatas	Piano Sonata No.1 taken from the recording by Joanna Trzeciak on Pavane (ADW 7291).
CACD 90522	Wolfgang Amadeus Mozart; Piano Sonatas, K.284, K.309, K.310	These three Sonatas are copied from the set by Ingrid Haebler on Denon (CO-79399). Hatto's other solo Mozart CDs have also been compared and the recordings have been shown to be identical to Haebler's.
CACD 90672	Franz Liszt; A Liszt Recital	Mephisto Waltz is taken from Musica Viva (1035 performed by Janina Fialkowska)
CACD 90682	Johann Sebastian Bach; Goldberg Variations	At least in part a copy of a performance by Chen Pi-hsien available on Naxos. The theme and first five variations have been compared side to side and are confirmed matches.
CACD 90722	Felix Mendelssohn; Songs without Words, Vol.1	11 of these pieces come from Sergei Babayan's recording on CNR Classics.
CACD 90832	Frédéric Chopin; Works for Piano & Orchestra, Vol.2	Krakowiak performed by İdil Biret on Naxos (slow introduction) and Garrick Ohlsson (fast section).
CACD 90842	Franz Liszt; Transcendental Etudes	Found to be a copy of performances by László Simon on BIS. In some copies, Minoru Nojima's recording on the Reference Recordings label replaces Simon's for étude no.5.
CACD 90852	Camille Saint-Saëns; Piano Concerto No.2	This appears to be the performance by Jean-Philippe Collard, accompanied by conductor André Previn, on EMI.
CACD 91112	Franz Liszt; Operatic Transcriptions: The Italian Opera, Vol.2	Hexameron is put together from recordings by Endre Hegedűs on Hungaroton, Francesco Nicolosi on Nuova Era, and Oleg Marshev on Danacord. Réminiscences des Puritains is from Hungaroton (HCD 31299) performed by Endre Hegedűs. The Réminiscences de Norma and Réminiscences de Lucia di Lammermoor are performed by Boris Bloch on Accord.
CACD 91122	Franz Liszt; Operatic Transcriptions: The Italian Opera, Vol.3	Tracks 1–5 taken from two CDs, Hungaroton (HCD 31547) and (HCD 31299) performed by Endre Hegedűs. Track 6 is from Giovanni Bellucci's recording on Assai (222172). (See also CACD91332.)
CACD 91202	Isaac Albéniz; Iberia	All tracks taken from the recording by Jean-François Heisser on Erato (4509-94807). Evocacion is stretched by 30 seconds.
CACD 91212, 91222; 91232; 91242	Sergei Prokofiev; Piano Works	Taken at least in large part from the set recorded by Oleg Marshev on the Danacord label. Sonata Nos. 1, 6, 7, and 8 have been matched so far.
CACD 91272	Sergei Rachmaninoff; Preludes	Preludes Op.23 No.4 in D major, Op.32 No.5 in G major, Op.32 No.12 in G sharp minor, and Op.32 No.13 in D flat major are copied from John Browning on Delos (DE 3044).
CACD 91292	Modest Mussorgsky – Pictures at an Exhibition; Sergei Rachmaninoff – Piano Sonata No.1	The Mussorgsky is taken from the recording by Michele Campanella on Nuova Era (9708017513599). The Rachmaninoff is taken from the recording by Tomás Kramreiteron the Ex Libris label.
CACD 91302	Claude Debussy; Preludes	Copied from Izumi Tateno's recording on Canyon Classics (PCCL 00122)/Finlandia (FACD 411).
CACD 91312	Claude Debussy; Complete Piano Works, Vol.2	Arabesques 1 & 2 are by Balázs Szokolay on Naxos. Hommage a Haydn and D'un cahier d'esquisses are by François-Joël Thiollier on Naxos. La plus que lente is by Noriko Ogawa on BIS (1205), track 13 is sped up by 7.6%, or 23 seconds. The source for the Études is the recording by Margit Rahkonen on Finlandia (4509-9558-1-2).
CACD 91322	Franz Liszt; The Etudes, Vol.2	Paganini Études performed by Yuri Didenko on Vista Vera.
CACD 91332	Franz Liszt; Operatic Paraphrase & Transcriptions, Vol.1	Track 3, Aida Coro di festa e marcia funebre, is from Giovanni Bellucci's recording on Assai (222172). (This track is also used as track 6 of CACD 91122, Liszt Operatic Paraphrase & Transcriptions Vol.3.) The Verdi/Liszt Salve Maria from I Lombardi and Verdi/Liszt Reminiscenes de Simon Boccanegra are taken from Alberto Reyes' CD on the Connoisseur Society label. The Ernani Paraphrase is by Herbert du Plessis on Pavane. The Sacred Dance and Final Duet from Aida, Rigoletto Paraphrase, and Miserere du Trovatore are all Boris Bloch on Accord.
CACD 91692	An Anthology of Recital Encores, Vol.2	Tracks 4, Schubert/Godowsky Rosamunde, and 10, Albéniz/Godowsky Tango, are taken from CBC/Musica Viva (MVCD1026), by Marc-André Hamelin). Track 8, Rubinstein Scherzo, is taken from Josef Banowetz's recording on Marco Polo (8-223176). Track 9, Busoni Kammer-Fantasie über Carmen, is taken from Russian Disc (RDCD 10026) by Leonid Kuzmin. Track 11, Sinding Rustle of Spring is taken from Naxos by Peter Nagy. Track 12, Rossini-Liszt La Danza, is taken from EMI France (7243-5-55382-2-2) by François-René Duchâble. The Czerny La Ricordanza Variations are performed by Oleg Marshev (Danacord), the Mendelssohn Variations on the Last Rose of Summer by Esther Budjiardo (Pro Piano) and the Paderewski Nocturne by Adam Wodnicki (Altarus).
CACD 91792	Sergei Rachmaninoff; The Transcriptions	Tracks 1–14 are taken from Harmonia Mundi/Saison Russe (RUS 288 122) performed by Alexander Guindin. (See also CACD 92172 entry.)
CACD 91952	Pyotr Ilyich Tchaikovsky – Piano Concerto No.1; Sergei Prokofiev – Piano Concerto No.3; Toccata, Op.11; Mily Balakirev – Islamey: an Oriental Fantasy	The Balakirev is taken from the recording by Michele Campanella on Nuova Era (9708017513599).
CACD 92082	Domenico Scarlatti; Keyboard Sonatas, Vol.1	Taken from recordings by Dubravka Tomšič Srebotnjak on Sonia Classic (CD 74537) and other labels (tracks 1, 5–6, 10–17) and Balázs Szokolay on Naxos (8.550252) (the rest).
CACD 92092	Domenico Scarlatti; Keyboard Sonatas, Vol.2	Taken from recordings by Patricia Pagny on De Plein Vent (DPV CD9346) (tracks 2–5, 9–11, 13, 16–19), Sergei Babayan on Pro Piano (PPR224506) (tracks 1, 6, 15), and Balázs Szokolay on Naxos (8.550252) (tracks 7, 8, 12, 14).
CACD 92102	Domenico Scarlatti; Keyboard Sonatas, Vol.3	Taken from recordings by Prisca Benoit, Maria Tipo, Chitose Okashiro, Balász Szokolay, and Sergei Babayan.
CACD 92172	Sergei Rachmaninoff; Piano Concertos	Found to be a copy of performances by Yefim Bronfman, conducted by Esa-Pekka Salonen released by Sony. Coupled with Six moments musicaux, Op.16, from Alexander Guindin's performance on Harmonia Mundi/Saison Russe (RUS 288 122).
CACD 92402	Domenico Scarlatti; Keyboard Sonatas, Vol.4	Taken from recordings by Beatrice Long, Benjamin Frith, Evgeny Zarafiants, Konstantin Scherbakov (all on Naxos) and Maria Tipo (on EMI).
CACD 92432	Frédéric Chopin; Études	17 of the 27 tracks (all except Op.10 Nos.2 & 6, Op.25 Nos.1 and 7–12; and Nouvelle Etude No.1) are copies of performances by Yuki Matsuzawa on Novalis (150704), in some cases with tempo manipulation.
CACD 92442; 92452	Franz Liszt; 75th Anniversary Recital	Scherzo and March from the recording by Jenő Jandó on Hungaroton.
CACD 92492	Enrique Granados; Piano Works, Vol.1	The first three pieces of Goyescas come from Hisako Hiseki's recording on La Ma de Guido (LMG 2031).
CACD 92502	Camille Saint-Saëns; Complete Works for Piano & Orchestra, Vol.1	Piano Concerto No.4 is from Angela Brownridge's recording on ASV. The whole Concerto is a half step flat on the Hatto CD. Piano Concerto No.5 is the recording by Anna Malikova on Audite.
CACD 92742	Paul Dukas; Complete Piano Music	Taken from Tor Espen Aspaas on Simax Classics (PSC1177). One track on the CD, "Pour le tombeau de Paul Dukas" by Manuel de Falla, is taken from Miguel Baselga's recording on BIS (CD 773) (reduced slightly in speed).

=== Early discography ===
The release of Arnold Bax's Symphonic Variations in E major (CACD90212 on the Concert Artist label) is a reissue of Hatto's 1970 recording with the Guildford Philharmonic conducted by Vernon Handley, originally issued on Barrington-Coupe's Revolution label.

Hatto's authentic recordings never had a wide distribution and the above-mentioned work of Bax was the last to appear on LP in 1970. In the 1980s, more works were released on cassette tapes (Grieg Piano Concerto and a number of Liszt compositions: the two Piano Concerti, Rigoletto paraphrase, Miserere del Trovatore paraphrase, Totentanz solo piano version, Seven Hungarian Historical Portraits). The solo piano repertoire of these releases shows works Hatto played also at that time in London on various occasions at the Wigmore Hall and other venues.

Her early releases include:

- Concert Artist 7-inch EPs:
  - Walter Gaze Cooper Piano Concerto #3
  - Elspeth Rhys-Williams, 4 Impressions, 2 Songs
  - Michael Williams Introduction & Allegro for piano & orchestra
- Saga:
  - "Music for the Films" (Addinsell, Bath, Chas. Williams) w/London Variety Theatre Orchestra/Gilbert Vinter
  - Gershwin Rhapsody in Blue w/Hamburg Pro Musica/George Byrd
  - Rachmaninoff Piano Concerto No. 2 w/Hamburg Pro Musica/George Hurst
  - Chopin Sonatas No. 1 & 3
  - Chopin Minor Piano works (Albumblatt, Fugue, Andante cantabile etc.)
- Delta:
  - Mozart Piano Concertos K. 466 & 488 w/Pasdeloup Orchestra/Isaie Disenhaus
  - Mozart Piano Concerto K. 453, Rondo K. 382 w/London Classic Players/David Littaur
- Fidelio:
  - Chopin 10 Nocturnes
  - Gershwin 16 items from the "Song Book"
  - Lecuona assorted piano pieces
- Revolution:
  - Bax Piano Sonata #1, Piano Sonata #4, Toccata, Water Music
  - Bax Symphonic Variations in E w/Guildford Philharmonic/Vernon Handley
- Boulevard
  - Rhapsody in Blue & An American in Paris from George Gershwin, with The New York Symphonica, conducted by George Byrd
    (Album brought out in 1973, by Allied Records Ltd., 326 Kensal Road, London, W10, as Boulevard, number 4124)
