= Saga Records =

British record label

Saga Records was a British independent record label first established in 1958. It pioneered budget-priced light classical music and jazz LPs.

== Origins ==
The Saga Records label emerged from Saga Films Ltd, a venture established by the British pianist Leonard Cassini (1913–1999) who had studied at the Curtis Institute in Philadelphia and broadcast frequently on the BBC from 1939 to 1974, including an appearance at the Proms in 1957. From 1955 he made films such as Watch the Music for BBC TV, and having performed in Eastern Europe he had the contacts to create BBC TV documentaries using state film units in Warsaw, East Berlin and Budapest. He registered Saga Films in October 1955, apparently with the intention of making films about composers, but lacked financial backing.

== 'Saga Records' initial releases ==
Cassini attracted investment from Wilfred Alonzo Banks, ACCA (1913–1983), a major in the Royal Army Service Corps in World War II where he was mentioned in despatches, and who had subsequently developed a business to import and distribute toys and decorations. He backed Cassini's proposal to create a new classical music label, but felt that neither he nor Cassini knew how to run such a business, so in March 1958 employed William Barrington-Coupe, whose own Concert Artists label had recently collapsed, as his A&R manager.

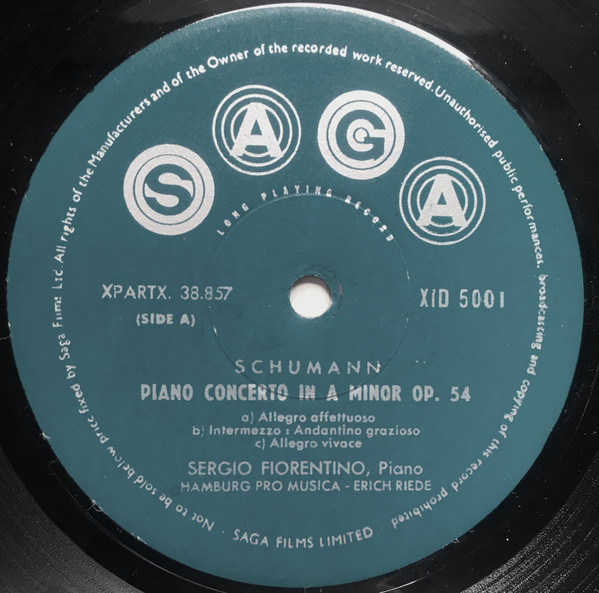
Saga Films Limited's first release (XID 1001) was from their initial Hamburg recording session.

Until the late 1950s, with very few exceptions, British recording studios were owned by major record companies. Orchestral recording was subject to strict union rules and the margin on record sales was small. Quality 12in LPs cost c. 30/- (£1.50: equivalent to £30 in 2020) of which half went in manufacturing and purchase tax, and distribution and dealers took much of the rest. Tape recording had been developed in Germany in the 1930s, but only became available in the UK when German tape machines, captured at the end of the war, were reverse-engineered. By 1958, tape recording had become affordable and portable, making it possible to record on location with a minimum of staff.

Through their European connections, Barrington-Coupe and Banks approached producer Paul Lazare in Hamburg who had access to a studio and session musicians at low cost, some of whom were attached to the Sinfonieorchester des Norddeutschen Rundfunks. Saga sent pianists Sergio Fiorentino and Joyce Hatto, both of whom were on Barrington-Coupe's books, to recording sessions Hamburg in 1958, and the orchestra was mostly directed by Erich Riede. James Lock, Barrington-Coupe's recording engineer at this time, would go on to make around five hundred recordings for Decca.They also recorded the Royal Danish Orchestra in Copenhagen under John Frandsen with Eileen Joyce and Alan Loveday. Some Russian tapes were procured, possibly through Cassini's Soviet contacts, so the public was offered quite a substantial selection of LPs, EPs and tapes when the first catalogue was published in September 1958. They were initially released by Saga Films Ltd and some of the discs were pressed by Pathé. The discs arrived in record shops in October priced at 25/- (£1.25) and competed with the major record companies' re-release labels. "High fidelity" tape releases were marketed by Elizabethan (Tape Recorders) Ltd branded as "Saga-Elizabethan" at 35/- (£1.75). At this stage, they were all mono recordings.

Initial Saga releases (September 1958)
Cat. No.	Title	Soloist	Orchestra	Conductor	Venue	Date
XID5001	Schumann: Piano Concerto	Sergio Fiorentino	Hamburg 'Pro Musica'	Erich Riede	Musikhalle, Hamburg	6-9 July 1958
XID5002	Tchaikovsky: Symphony No.6		Bolshoi Theatre	Alexander Melik-Pashayev	Moscow	c. 1957
XID5003	"Night in Vienna"		Leipzig Gewandhaus	Otto Dobrindt	Leipzig	c. 1955
XID5004	Tchaikovsky: Swan Lake excerpts		Bolshoi Theatre	Yuri Faier		
XID5005	"Songs of the Shows"		'London Variety Theatre'	Thomas Hughes	Hamburg?	
XID5006	Beethoven: Symphony No.5		Hamburg 'Pro Musica'	Erich Riede	Musikhalle, Hamburg?	July 1958?
XID5007	"My Favourite Encores"	Eileen Joyce			London?	After April 1958
XID5008	Liszt: Piano Concerto No.1	Sergio Fiorentino	Hamburg 'Pro Musica'	Erich Riede	Musikhalle, Hamburg	
XID5010	Brahms: Symphony No.4		Royal Danish	John Frandsen	Copenhagen?	1958
XID5012	Rimsky-Korsakov: Scherazade	Mikhail Karevich (violin)	USSR State Radio	Nathan Rakhlin	Moscow?	c. 1951
XID5013	Chopin/Liszt: Piano pieces	Leff Pouishnoff			London	1958
XID5014	Beethoven, et al.: Overtures		USSR State Radio	Alexander Gauk	Moscow	c. 1958
XID5015	Arne: The Cooper	Ann Dowdall, Duncan Robertson, Eric Shilling	Intimate Opera Company	Antony Hopkins	London	1958
XID5016	Chopin: Waltzes...	Sergio Fiorentino			Musikhalle, Hamburg	7 July 1958

== Collapse and sale of the business ==
The major British labels started releasing stereo LPs in mid 1958, but continued to press mono releases for some years. In October 1959 Saga advertised a short-lived Stereo Multi-Play offering “for perfect reproduction on either monaural or stereo record players, thanks to a special cutting technique” at the challenging price of 45/- (£2.25). By then, with further expensive recording sessions in Germany and loss-making promotional concerts in London, Saga's capital was running out. A licensing deal for distribution of Saga's tapes in the USA was struck with Roulette, who created the Forum label specially for its classical releases. Barrington-Coupe was advertising recordings that had not yet been made, including a Beethoven symphony cycle.

In February 1960, Barrington-Coupe and record producer Joe Meek formed Triumph (Superfi) Sound Ltd, targeting a teenage market was just emerging in the UK. Following a clash of personalities, largely due to the different markets addressed by Saga and Triumph, Meek walked out in September. He took his artists with him to a new independent production company, RGM Sound Ltd, again backed by Wilfred Banks.

Whilst other independent labels relied on budget releases of well-known orchestras hiding behind a pseudonym, Saga traded on its recognised artists. A recording of items from West Side Story was conducted by Lawrence Leonard, who had been chosen by Leonard Bernstein to conduct the London premiere. Concert promotions of Saga recording stars at the Royal Festival Hall and elsewhere were scheduled to promote the label in early 1960. The London Philharmonic Choir and orchestra with soloists Harper, Watts, Robertson and Stalman under Frederic Jackson were engaged to record Handel's Messiah in May 1960, and further Hamburg sessions led to a cash crisis. Barrington-Coupe arranged to sell about fifty unissued master tapes to Marcel Rodd, but creditors foreclosed in July. The Official Receiver held Barrington-Coupe responsible for the company's collapse.

Barrington-Coupe walked away, taking his artists with him, and Wilfred Banks was left with the master tapes and the Saga name. With no staff, facilities or artists on his books, Banks traded the business and its rights in over 300 master recordings to Marcel Rodd of Allied Records/Classics Club for 1,000 bargain "Lyrique" LPs, a deal completed in March 1961 once he had established that Barrington Coupe had no copyright claim over the tapes.

== Expansion under Allied Records ==
The tapes that Rodd's Allied Records had acquired from Saga Saga Films included musicals, "light classical" releases, dance and jazz bands, theatre organs and popular singers as well as classical favourites.There were over three hundred Saga titles, fifty that had belonged to Barrington-Coupe plus another hundred mono Russian recordings that had originally been imported in 1954 by the James Quality Recording Company and partially released under the Monarch label between 1954 and 1956. Saga had not used them, possibly because they were not stereo.

In March 1961 Rodd hired Ted Perry (who was later to establish Hyperion) as label manager. Perry created a new full-price Celebrity sub-label which featured the Fine Arts Quartet and made John Shirley-Quirk's debut recording.

Barrington-Coupe by now had set up a new budget label, Fidelio, retailing at 12/6 (62½p) and Rodd responded with Fidelity. He reused some of the Lyrique masters which he had previously sold to Banks and acquired tapes from the French budget label Guilde Européene du Microsillon (GEM), many without documented attribution. Perry was left to sort out the details, including inventing artists for unattributed tapes and deleting tapes which had deteriorated, such as the Urania catalogue. Rodd was a difficult employer and Perry left Saga within eighteen months.

In February 1962 Marcel Rodd moved to a large Victorian house near Swiss Cottage where he converted the basement ballroom into a recording studio and set up Saga's offices on the ground floor. He and his family lived above. The disk cutting and record pressing was done at a factory in North Kensington. Robin O'Connor was recruited to replace Perry and recalled his job interview in April 1964 with Marcel Rodd:

" ... where the man himself was propped up in bed, resplendent in black pyjamas ... papers strewn all over the bed, the man's piercing gaze, the gruff voice barking out sharp questions."

Rodd acquired two more failed record businesses in May 1963; the Record Society, which had promoted a specialist catalogue, and Associated Recordings which had imported Czech Supraphon discs and licensed USSR Melodiya recordings as well as Westminster's quality classical catalogue from the USA. Rodd's Classics Club label was wound up in mid 1964 and the enlarged Saga Records moved into a former paint factory at 326, Kensal Road. The non-classical repertoire was shifted onto the Society and Presto labels and the Celebrity series discontinued. Choral and organ repertoire arrived with the acquisition of Alpha Records, Oxford in 1966 and some baroque and classical chamber music was licensed from Amadeo on condition that pseudonyms concealed the musicians’ identities. Label managers came and went over the next few years.

== Stereo LPs introduced ==
By 1965 it was clear that the market wanted only stereo recordings and mono tapes were "remastered" to create a stereo effect. Saga engineers used a phase splitter and a couple of equalisers to split the signal into two, adding top frequencies to the 'A' channel (where most of the orchestral strings are usually placed) and a bit of bass to 'B' to emphasise the cellos and basses. However, the rise of budget re-release labels, such as Classics for Pleasure backed by EMI, made it difficult to market these older pseudo-stereo recordings and by the end of the decade new releases were so sparse that regular advertising in Gramophone dried up in 1971.

== Investment in artists and repertoire ==
Rodd re-hired Ted Perry as Artists and Repertoire Manager in March 1973 and gave him scope to make the sort of recordings he wanted to make. Martin Compton, a music graduate, was already on Saga's staff and became studio producer and John Shuttleworth, a teacher at Eltham College was recording engineer. recording venues with better acoustics also helped to restore Saga's reputation. Perry placed an advertisement in Gramophone claiming that new equipment produced LPs pressed “to the highest standards”, though Saga's reputation for poor quality pressing persisted. Perry launched three remastered series; SAGA 5000 budget LPs with re-released Shirley-Quirk and Baker records costing 71p, SAGA 6000 jazz LPs at £1.25, and SAGA 7000 'immortals' featuring Caruso, Melba, etc. at 95p. In 1977, Perry moved on again and was employed at Meridian Records before creating Hyperion.

Martin Compton continued producing releases and the last new titles produced by Nicholas Dicker were added in 1984. From 1979 Saga's discs were pressed by Teldec in Germany.

== Legacy ==
Saga's master tapes were donated by Marcel Rodd to the British Library Sound Archive in March 1989, with licence fees passed to the Saga Trust. The Trust supports the British Library Edison Fellowship programme, designed to encourage scholarship devoted to the history of recordings or western art music and music in performance.

== Saga Classics ==
In 1990 Sound-Products Holland B.V. licensed the tapes for transfer to CD and began to issue the discs in 1992, but ceased trading year later. The series was taken over by Emergo Classics until 1997, who released 46 CDs. Half of these titles originated in the 1970s, and another quarter from earlier Saga or Classics Club sessions. The balance were 1950s recordings from various sources, four of Russian origin.

== Catalogue numbers ==
Series and catalogue number summary
Label	Series	Range	From	To	
Saga	XID	5001-80	1958	1962	Original 12in LP Mono
Saga	EFID	1001-25	1958	1959	7in 45 rpm EP
Saga	STA-STG		1958	1962	'Saga Sound" tapes
Saga	AAA ST	4000-12	1959		"Stereo Multi-Play"
Saga	STM	6001-40	1959	1961	Mainly light music
Saga	STP	1013-	1961		7in 45 rpm EP
Saga	RGJ	7002	1960		7in 45 rpm EP
Saga	EFD	1501	1961		7in 45 rpm EP
Saga	EFP	2501	1961		7in 45 rpm EP
Lyrique	HPG	1001-70	1964		Mainly GEM recordings
Saga	XIP	7001-15	1961	1963	Celebrity Series
Saga	XID	5101-84	1961	1964	Budget Classics Club re-issues
Saga	XID	5201-5338	1963	1971	Budget re-issues of XIP series
Octave	OC	1-16	1962		7in 33 rpm
Octave	ARC	1-100	1963	1965	7in 33 rpm
Saga Heritage	XIG	8001-18	1963		Opera Society 78 rpm transfers
Fidelity	FDY	2001-85	1963	1964	Ultra budget Lyrique re-issues
Society	SOC	901-1057	1963	1967	SCALA (XIL) re-issues
Presto	PRE	601-90	1964	1965	STUDIO (XIC) re-issues
Opus	TW	801-45	1964		Re-issued Lyrique/Fidelity
Pan	SPAN	6001-10	1966		Licensed from Amadeo
Pan	SPAN	6200-22	1966	1968	New and re-issued recordings
Eros		8000-8157	1966	1970	Non-classical
Boulevard		4000-4182	1967	1974	"Middle of the road"
Fidelity	FDY	1900-8	1967		Fake stereo reissues
Fidelity	FDY	2086-2175	1967	1969	Fake stereo reissues
Psyché	PSY	30001-10	1968	1969	Full priced music, drama & poetry
Pan	PAN	6300-30	1971	1972	Eros continuation (and Alpha)
Opus	OPUS	1001-12	1972	1979	Re-issued late 50s stereo recordings
Saga	SAGA	6900-32	1973	1975	Jazz "Immortal Sessions"
Saga	SAGA	7001-30	1973	1974	"Heritage" series reissues
Saga	SAGA	5336-5492	1973	1983	Perry recordings and later re-issues
Saga	HAYDN	1-2	1981	1982	Aborted Haydn complete symphonies
Psyché	PSY	1-17	1984	1986	Final Saga recording sessions

== Working with other labels ==
In 1968, Trend Records which was run by London record Dealer, Barry Class had entered into an arrangement with Saga Records for the manufacture and distribution of its product. Class who managed The Foundations was said to have stated that he went to Saga as he had great faith in the budget market.
