= Chen Pi-hsien =

Taiwanese-German classical pianist

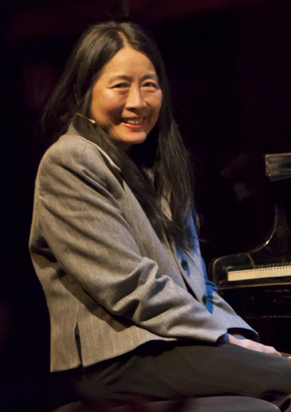
Chen Pi-hsien in 2011

Chen Pi-hsien (Chinese: 陳必先; pinyin: Chén Bìxiān; born 15 November 1950) is a Taiwanese-German classical pianist. She has received honors at several international piano competitions. She teaches at the Hochschule für Musik Freiburg and lives in Germany at present.

== Biography ==
Chen Pi-hsien was born in Taiwan. Her parents were born in mainland China but went to Taiwan in 1949 during the Civil War. Her father was a college professor. She began to take piano lessons at the age of four and gave public performance at the early age of five. When she was nine, she was sent to Cologne to continue her studies at the Hochschule für Musik Köln with Hans-Otto Schmidt-Neuhaus, where she received her diploma as classical pianist in 1970. In the following years she pursued her studies with Hans Leygraf and took part in piano courses given by Wilhelm Kempff, Tatiana Nikolayeva, Claudio Arrau, and Géza Anda.

In 1972, Chen won international appreciation with a prize at the Concours Reine Elisabeth and the first prize at the Rundfunkanstalten ARD International Piano Competition in Munich. Later she won the first prizes at the Arnold Schönberg Competition in Rotterdam and at the J.S.Bach Competition in Washington D.C.

Since then Chen has given performances at important places such as London, Amsterdam, Zürich, Berlin, Munich and Tokyo. She has played with famous orchestras, such as the London Symphony Orchestra, the BBC Symphony Orchestra, the Concertgebouw Orchestra, the Residentie Orchestra, the Zurich Tonhalle Orchestra and all German Radio Symphony Orchestras. Conductors, with whom she has worked, were Bernard Haitink, Paul Sacher, Colin Davis, Charles Dutoit, Marek Janowski, Hans Zender, Peter Eötvös and others. She was partner of Hermann Baumann, Pierre-Laurent Aimard, Augustin Dumay, Alyssa Park, Wolfgang Meyer and Julius Berger. She took part in numerous music festivals: she gave performances in the Schwetzinger Festspiele, the London Proms, the Osaka Festival, the Hong Kong Arts Festival, the Festival d'Automne Paris, the Festival Wien Modern and the Triennale Cologne 1994 and 1997, as well as the Festivals of Lucerne and Osaka.

Her increasing interest and engagement for contemporary music grew in the cooperation with composers as John Cage, Pierre Boulez, Karlheinz Stockhausen and György Kurtág. In 1999, she was successfully touring in mainland China, Hong Kong and Taiwan. Besides that she performed music by contemporary German composers and pieces by John Cage and Elliott Carter on different German festivals.

Since 1983, Chen has been a professor for the piano at the Hochschule für Musik Köln. Since 2004 she holds a similar position at the Hochschule für Musik Freiburg. She also holds the position of guest professor at the Institute of Music of National Chiao Tung University.

== Discography ==
- J.S. Bach, "Goldberg Variations" (Naxos Records) [NOTE: this recording was the one pirated by William Barrington-Coupe as being the work of his wife, Joyce Hatto, in a celebrated plagiarism hoax.]
- J.S. Bach, "Goldberg Variations" (2003) (CFM)
- J.S. Bach, "Die Kunst Der Fuge" (CFM)
- P. Boulez, "Notations" and "Structures II", with Bernhard Wambach (CBS)
- P. Boulez, "Notations" and "3 Piano Sonatas" (hat-now-art)
- P. Boulez, "Structures" I & II; J. Cage, "Music for Piano" (hat-now-art)
- O. Messiaen, "Harawi", with Sigune von Osten (ITM)
- W. A. Mozart, "Mozart Piano Works" (2 CD) (Sunrise)
- Jean Barraqué and Pierre Boulez, Sonatas (Telos)
- York Höller, "Signals" (Largo)
- F. Mendelssohn, Complete Works for Cello and Piano, with Markus Stocker (Ex Libris)
- Arnold Schönberg, Complete Piano Music for Two Hands (hat-now-art)
- Xiaoyong Chen, "Invisible Landscapes" (Radio Bremen)
- "Mitteilungen vom unteilbaren Werk", Live Recording (2018, Telos Music)
