= A Walk With Mr. Heifetz =

- Written by: James Inverne
- Setting: 1926, Mandatory Palestine

Premiere
- Date: January 31, 2018
- Place: New York, New York (Cherry Lane Theatre)

A Walk With Mr. Heifetz is a 2018 Off-Broadway play written by James Inverne which premiered on January 31, presented by Primary Stages Theater Company at the Cherry Lane Theatre. Directed by Primary Stages' artistic director Andrew Leynse, the play stars Adam Green, Yuval Boim, and Erik Lochtefeld, and featured live music performed by violinist Mariella Haubs.

In May 2020 an audio recording of the play was released on YouTube for a limited time and to benefit the charities the America Israel Cultural Foundation and Meir Panim. The cast included Yuval Boim, Ed Stoppard, Richard Topol and Mariella Haubs.

== Summary ==
The play revolves around the true-life story in 1926 of a visit by famed violinist Jascha Heifetz to British Mandatory Palestine, where he performed in a stone quarry at the Ein Harod kibbutz. After the concert, Heifetz goes on a long walk with Yehuda Sharett, the kibbutz movement pioneer, composer and brother to Zionist leader (and later first Foreign Minister and second Prime Minister of Israel) Moshe Sharett. The play deals with the reverberations of that visit on the Sharett brothers and the implications of Yehuda's conversation with Heifetz on the creation of Israel, as 20 years later the brothers meet as war looms on the horizon.

== Development ==
The play was developed through a series of private readings in New York City and a public preview reading in London at the Jewish Book Week festival at King's Place in March 2017, which featured performances by Henry Goodman and Ed Stoppard.
