= Paul Procopolis =

Paul Procopolis is the name given to a non-existent classical pianist who was credited as a performer on various recordings.

With the advent of cheap long-playing records, unscrupulous companies issued records of material under pseudonyms to avoid paying royalties or because they did not own the copyright to the recordings. In the case of Paul Procopolis, the reasons for the recording company, Saga Records issuing recordings pseudonymously are uncertain, as they would have had the copyright to at least some of the material. According to Robin O'Connor (see Sources), the company's intention was to compile pre-existing recordings by several different performers on one album and present them as the work of a single performer.

The name Paul Procopolis was used to reissue recordings by the pianist Sergio Fiorentino, including the complete Chopin waltzes, extracts from Bach's Well-Tempered Clavier, and works by Liszt. Some of the LPs included a biography of Procopolis who, it was alleged, was born in Athens in 1934, studied with Nadia Boulanger in Paris and lived and taught in Greece. The biography was written by Robin O'Connor. Various other LPs give no biographical information at all.

Ernst Lumpe has attempted to identify the real artists in the Procopolis recordings. Other pianists whose recordings were issued under this name included Bernard Vitebsky (his Beethoven Concerto No. 3), Albert Ferber (an LP of "The World's Best Loved Piano Music") and Clive Lythgoe. The recording of the Second Chopin Concerto has been identified as that of the Brazilian pianist Carmen Vitis Adnet (who lived in Vienna and was married to pianist Hans Graf) with the Vienna Symphony under Hans Swarowsky. Further recordings (such as the First Chopin Concerto) remain unidentified.

== Sources ==
- The Fiorentino recordings issued under the name of Procopolis are identified at Ernst Lumpe's website.
- Robin O'Connor, the man who assembled many of the Paul Procopolis LPs, recounts how they came into being on the MusicWeb website.
