= László Simon =

Hungarian pianist (1948–2009)

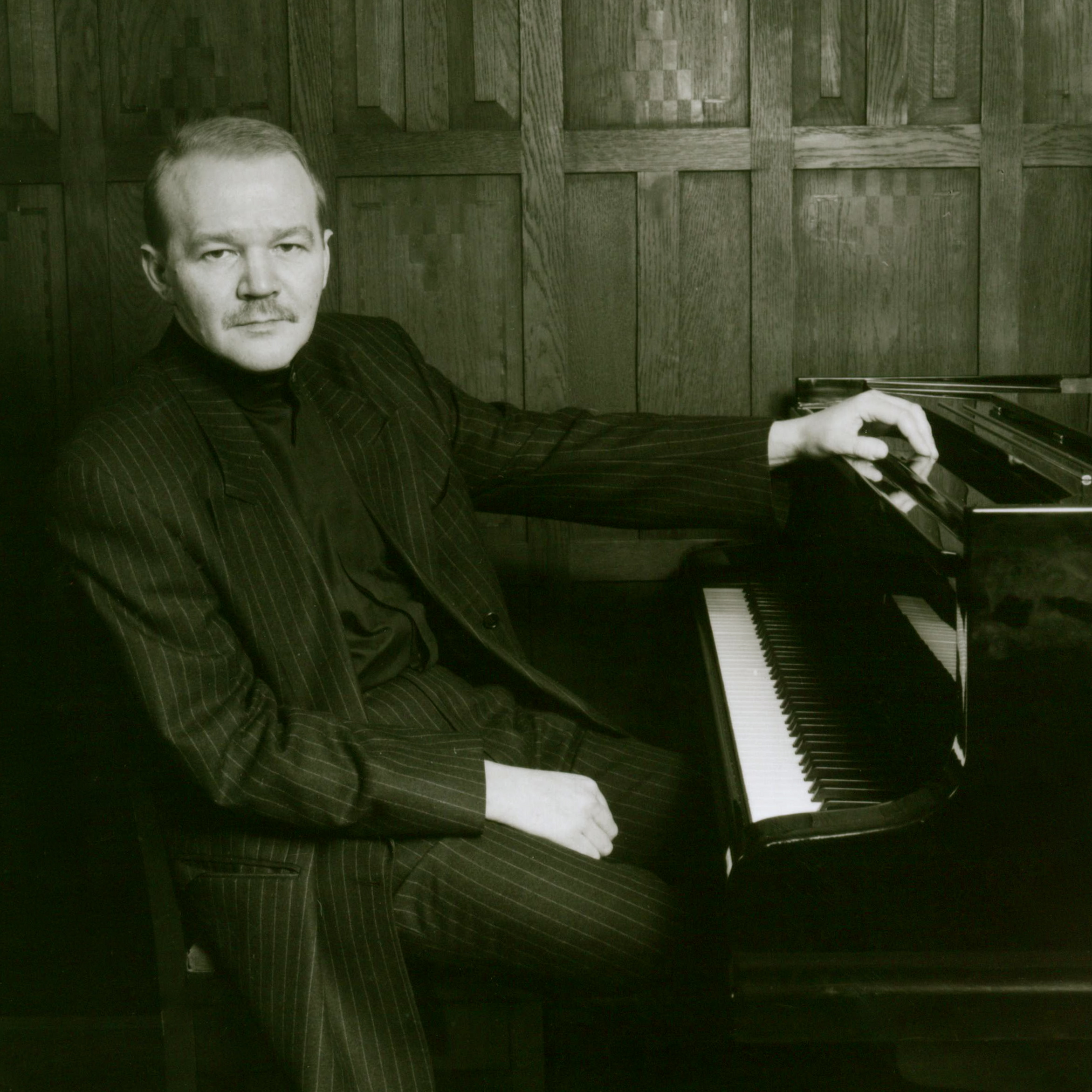
- Born: 16 July 1948; Miskolc, Hungary
- Died: 9 September 2009 (aged 61); Berlin, Germany
- Style: Classical

László Simon (16 July 1948 – 9 September 2009) was a Hungarian pianist.

== Professional life ==
László Simon was born in Miskolc. He studied under Zoltán Benkö in Budapest, and under Hans Leygraf in Stockholm and Hannover. He also received artistic and pianistic incitements from Claudio Arrau in New York. He would later be praised for his excellent performance in international piano competitions Casagrande (1971, 1st place, jointly shared), Geneva and Busoni and received the King's Swedish Music Award. His recording of the twelfth Transcendental Études by Franz Liszt was later part of the evidence in the plagiarism scandal involving recordings by the English pianist Joyce Hatto (1928-2006), and became more famous as a result of the investigation.

László Simon was a respected piano teacher throughout the world. After working in Darmstadt, Hannover and Karlsruhe, he became a professor at the Berlin University of the Arts in 1981. In this position, he mentored the conductor Shi-yeon Sung as well as the pianists Gergely Boganyi, Li-Chun Su and Ji-yeoun You. He died in Berlin, aged 61.

== Press coverage ==
D.A.W.M.: Remarkable Liszt. In: The Daily Telegraph (1975)

Laszlo Simon ... is a distinguished artist, having not only a stupendous technique with an unusually large and sonorous tone, but also ripe experience and deep familiarity with the music of Schubert, Beethoven, and Liszt. Only a completely equipped player could have given such a remarkable performance of the Liszt Sonata, soaring into its heights and bringing out every modulation in its depth and without the slightest loss of tonal purity. Clarity and directness of manner also served Mr Simon well in Beethoven's Sonata in D minor Op. 31 No. 2. The melodic line of the Adagio was beautifully shaped and having such a command of legato, he could probably have taken the whole movement a shade more slowly without losing impetus.

D.A.W.M.: László Simon. In: The Daily Telegraph (Feb. 1977)

The Hungarian pianist László Simon chose music by his great compatriots Liszt and Bartók, for his return visit to London last night.

His strong and skilful fingers produced patterns of sound in Bartók's Suite, the scherzo and the allegro third movement beinig played with a stronger tone than is usual. Mr Simon's prowess was in keeping with the brilliant, extrovert qualities of the Bartók Sonata, the big stretches in the last movement having no terrors for him, yet sometimes his playing was a little too rigid rhythmically to sustain the stark drama of the quick movements.

Mr Simon's performance of Liszt's Funérailles and Ricordanza were both exciting and lyrical, and the Mephisto Waltz revealed the technical command and the craftsmanlike apitude of this young and vital player.

Dominic Gill: Laszlo Simon. In: London Financial Times (1977)

The Hungarian pianist László Simon divided his recital in the Purcell Room last Friday between Bartók and Liszt. It was no fault of his that the extraordinary Liszt playing of Jorge Bolet the previous evening was still ringing so powerfully in our ears; but certain comparisons were unavoidable. They were also unfortunate, for Mr. Simon is an exceptionally talented young artist: he has a strong technique, and a searching, individual way with the familiar romantic repertory that showed a refreshing contempt for easy cliché: his manner is quick and confident, and he is not afraid, when necessary to push himself to his limits.
