= Morton Estrin =

American classical pianist and teacher (1923–2017)

- Born: December 29, 1923; Burlington, Vermont, U.S.
- Died: December 7, 2017 (aged 93)
- Genres: Classical
- Occupation: Musician
- Instrument: Piano

Morton Estrin (December 29, 1923 – December 7, 2017) was an American classical pianist and teacher.

His career began in 1949 with a well-received recital at Town Hall in New York. He studied with the teacher Vera Maurina-Press and others.

Estrin made the first recording of Alexander Scriabin's complete Twelve Etudes, Op. 8, which he re-recorded in 1991. Both recordings reflect the hallmarks of Estrin's style - a robust tone, formidable technique and an unusually large and sophisticated tonal palette.

Other notable recordings include a selection of Brahms intermezzos along with his Opus 119 piano pieces, and the complete Opus 32 Preludes of Sergei Rachmaninoff. These records, released in the early 1970s on the Connoisseur Society label, are among the best recordings of these works and continue to be available. Estrin's other recordings for the Connoisseur Society are also available.

In 1985, Estrin played all 24 Rachmaninoff Preludes at Alice Tully Hall.

Estrin recorded several albums of miniatures entitled Great Hits You Played When You Were Young. More recent recordings included a suite by Brahms contemporary Joachim Raff and études by Anton Rubinstein.

Although Estrin performed throughout his career, he devoted most of his time to teaching. Estrin was a professor at Hofstra University and private teacher on Long Island, where he resided until his death. His students included John Mauceri, Billy Joel, Mo Fink, and Debbie Gibson.

Estrin died on December 7, 2017, at the age of 93.
