= Connoisseur Society =

American record label

- Founded: 1961
- Founder: E. Alan Silver, James Goodfriend
- Genre: Classical, jazz
- Country of origin: U.S.
- Location: West Winfield, New York

Connoisseur Society was an American audiophile classical music and jazz record label. It was founded by E. Alan Silver and James Goodfriend. Silver and Goodfriend helped artists from the Eastern bloc to perform in the US during the Cold War, among them Ivan Moravec in 1962.

The label released albums of Millette Alexander and Frank Daykin, known collectively as Alexander and Daykin, Sergei Babayan, Antonio Barbosa, Samuel Bartos, Sara Davis Buechner (born David Buechner), Linda Bustani, George Darden, Anthony di Bonaventura, Kate Dillingham, Walter Hautzig, Morton Estrin, Madeleine Forte, Joyce Hatto, Michael Jamanis, Trudy Kane, Ali Akbar Khan, Ruth Laredo, Mirjana Lewis, João Carlos Martins, Blair McMillan, Ivan Moravec, Garrick Ohlsson, Zaidee Parkinson, Manitas de Plata, Richard Reid, Cynthia Raim, Alberto Reyes, Elizabeth Rich, Edward Rosser, Mordecai Shehori, Myron Silberstein, Patrick Stephens, Joe Utterback, Ilana Vered, Frances Veri, David Allen Wehr, Wanda Wiłkomirska, and Oxana Yablonskaya.

Some of the label's releases include:

- Joe Utterback, piano; So Many Stars; Lionel Hampton/Sonny Burke: Midnight Sun; Ann Ronell: Willow Weep For Me; Bobby Troup: Get Your Kicks on Route 66 (CD 4259)
- Edward Rosser, piano; Visions of Beyond, late and last piano works by: Chopin, Beethoven, Brahms, Schubert, Liszt, Schumann, Debussy (CD 4260)
- Cynthia Raim, piano; Johannes Brahms: Haendel Variations, Three Intermezzi, Eight Kavierstücke (CD 4266)
- David Allen Wehr, piano; Beethoven: The 32 Piano Sonatas, Volume 4, 2 CDs; Schubert: Piano Sonata in B flat major (CD 4264)

The label became known for the premiere recording of Scriabin's complete 10 sonatas with Ruth Laredo in 1970 (CS 2032, CS 2034 and CS 2035).

Silver is also head of the company In Sync, which offers remasterings on CD from cassettes and LPs.
