= Alex Campbell and His Friends =

1967 studio album by Alex Campbell

Studio album by Alex Campbell, Sandy Denny and Johnny Silvo and Johnny Silvo Folk Group
- Released: 1967
- Recorded: 22 March 1967, London
- Label: Saga Records ERO 8021 (Mono) and EROS 8021 (Stereo)
- Producer: Marcel Rodd

Alex Campbell chronology
| Alex Campbell at the Tivoli Gardens (1967) | Alex Campbell and His Friends (1967) | Alex Campbell Live (1967) |

Sandy Denny chronology
| Alex Campbell and His Friends (1967) | Sandy and Johnny (1967) |

Alex Campbell and his Friends is an album by Alex Campbell recorded with Sandy Denny, Johnny Silvo and the Johnny Silvo Folk Group featuring Roger Evans and David Moses, Paul McNeill and Cliff Aungier.

This March 1967 recording is the first release on which Sandy Denny was featured.

== Track listing ==
Side 1

1. Alex Campbell: "Dark as a Dungeon (Down in the Mine)" (Merle Travis)
2. Johnny Silvo: "Midnight Special" (trad)
3. Johnny Silvo: "Cornbread, Peas and Black Molasses" (trad)
4. Johnny Silvo: "Freight Train" (Elizabeth Cotten)
5. Sandy Denny: "The False Bride" (trad)
6. Alex Campbell: "Don't Think Twice It's Alright" (Bob Dylan)
7. Cliff Aungier: "Chilly Winds" (trad)
8. Cliff Aungier: "Blue Sleeves" (trad)

Side 2

1. Paul McNeill: "Dick Derby" (trad)
2. Sandy Denny: "You Never Wanted Me" (Jackson C. Frank)
3. Alex Campbell: "Been on the Road So Long" (Alex Campbell)
4. Cliff Aungier: "Dink's Song" (trad)
5. Sandy Denny (with the Johnny Silvo Folk Group): "This Train" (trad)
6. Paul McNeill: "Tell Old Bill" (trad)
7. Alex Campbell: "Freedom" (trad)

== Reissues ==
Saga Records produced another album with Sandy Denny: Sandy and Johnny. In 1970, Saga released a compilation called It's Sandy Denny that featured the songs Denny recorded for the label, partly as alternate takes.

The complete material (original plus alternate takes) was issued by Castle Music in 2005 under the title Where the Time Goes.
