= Maimie McCoy =

English actress

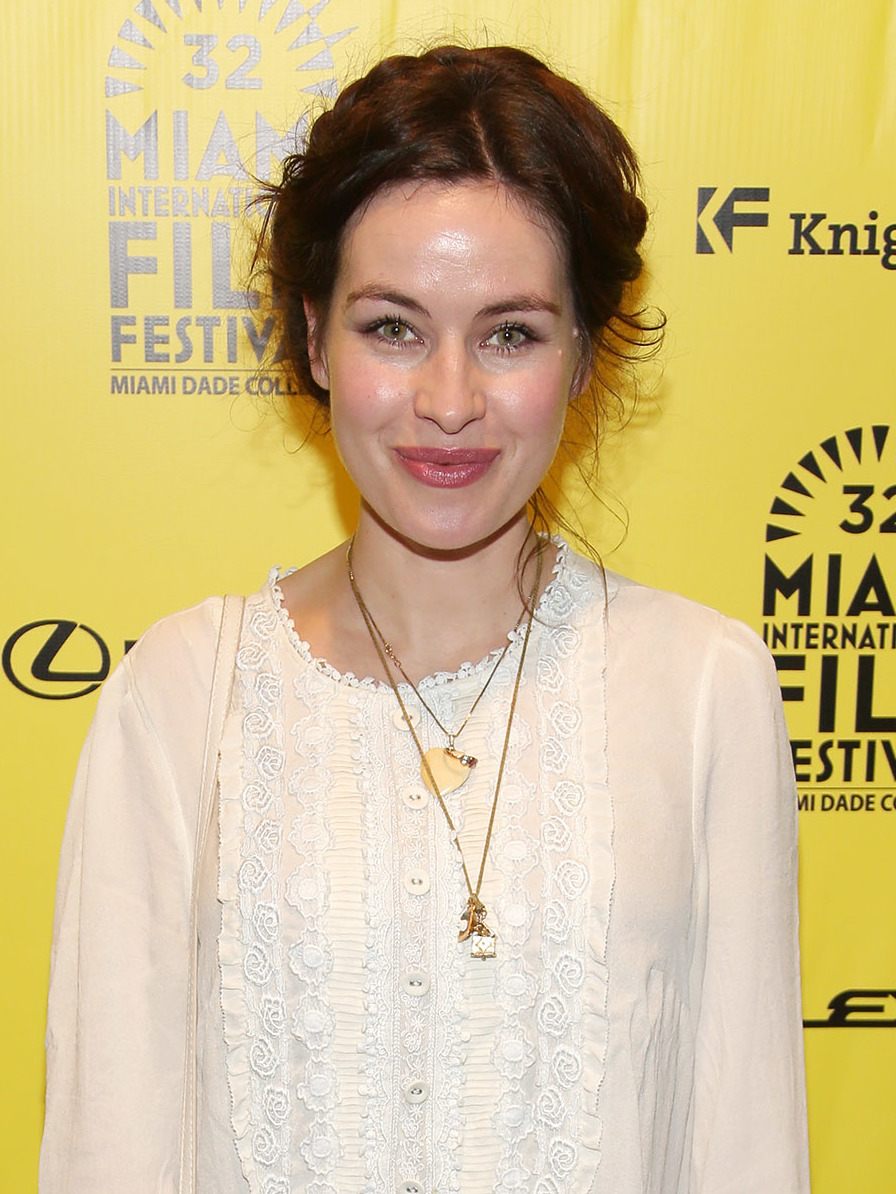
- McCoy in 2015
- Born: Mary McCoy; Yorkshire, England
- Education: London Metropolitan University (BA)
- Occupation: Actress
- Years active: 2002–present
- Children: 1

Mary McCoy, professionally known as Maimie McCoy is an English actress. She portrayed Milady de Winter in The Musketeers (2014–2016), and is the female lead in the ITV reboot series Van der Valk (2020–).

== Early life and education ==
Mary McCoy was born in Yorkshire. McCoy is the daughter of restaurateurs Eugene and Barbara McCoy, once owners of The Tontine hotel and restaurant near Stokesley, who now run the Crathorne Arms pub in Crathorne, North Yorkshire. Her elder brother Rory was one of the owners of London restaurants Ducksoup and The Picklery Little Duck and now owner of Mister McCoy's Island Ices ,ice cream and wine bar in Soller, Mallorca and her younger brother is the acclaimed actor, singer, and dancer Eugene McCoy. Her maternal uncle is the impressionist Kevin Connelly.

McCoy attended Stokesley School.

Initially a dancer, she then studied performing arts at London Metropolitan University, graduating with a BA (Hons) in 2001.

== Career ==
McCoy's screen career includes episodes of Doctors, The Bill, Waking the Dead, and Taggart.

In 2009, she appeared in Personal Affairs as Nicole Palmerston-Amory, a "man-eating, cynical realist (who) favours money over love". This was McCoy's first leading role, for which she was nominated for a TV Quick Award as best supporting actress.

In December 2012, McCoy played the role of the younger Joyce Hatto in the BBC's production of Loving Miss Hatto.

In April 2013, she appeared in "Rocket", the third episode of Endeavour, playing Alice Vexin, an old student acquaintance of the young Morse character. Later that year, she starred in the short film Fare with Christian Cooke. She appeared as the female lead, Milady de Winter, in the BBC's The Musketeers (2014–2016), and as Dorothy in Channel 5's remake series All Creatures Great and Small (2020–present).

She plays the female lead, opposite Marc Warren, in the ITV reboot series Van Der Valk.

== Filmography ==
=== Film ===
Year	Title	Role	Notes, Refs.
2005	The Libertine	Acting Troop	
2005	The Illiterate	Visiting Woman	Short film
2006	Minotaur	Morna	
2007	Romance	Julie	Short film
2007	Virgin Territory	Simona	
2007	The Boat People	Cleo	
2008	Slaphappy	Judy Magenta	Short films
2008	Oh, Simone	Simone	Short films
2008	Domestics	Woman	Short films
2009	Christmas Time	Shop Assistant	Short films
2010	Forbidden	(unknown)	Short films
2010	East End Stories	(unknown)	Short films
2013	Fare	Charon	Short films
2014	Set Fire to the Stars	Rosie	
2015	Fuel to Fire	Ila Butcher	Short films
2017	The Dead Dog	Daisy	Short films
2018	Early Days	Kate	Short film. Also associate producer
2019	Trick or Treat	Gemma	
2023	The Performance	Carol	

=== Television ===
Year	Title	Role	Notes, Refs.
2002	Doctors	Shelley Garrett	Series 4; episode 52: "Time Bomb"
2004	Waking the Dead	Sarah Faulkner	Series 4; episodes 5 & 6: "Fugue States: Parts 1 & 2"
2004	Top Buzzer	Sophie	Episodes 1 & 5–10
2005	Peter Warlock: Some Little Joy	Puma	Television film
2006	Taggart	Jessica Flowers	Series 22; episode 9: "The Best and the Brightest"
2006	The Bill	Meg Lawson	Series 22; episode 41: "Mistaken and Misspoken"
2007	Little Devil	Deborah	Mini-series; episode 3
2009	Desperate Romantics	Margaret	Mini-series; episodes 1 & 2
2009	Personal Affairs	Nicole Palmerston-Amory	Mini-series; episodes 1 & 3–6
2010	Doctors	Vicky Perry	Series 11; episode 222: "Birth of the Blues"
2011	Casualty	Sarah Maddick	Series 25; episode 25: "Till Death Us Do Part"
2011	The Crimson Petal and the White	Fireside Whore 1	Mini-series; episodes 1 & 4
2011	Without You	Christine	Mini-series; episode 1
2012	Wallander	Anna Westin	Series 3; episode 3: "Before the Frost"
2012	Loving Miss Hatto	Young Joyce Hatto	Television film
2013	Endeavour	Alice Vexin	Series 1; episode 3: "Rocket"
2013	The Last Witch	Kate Greenwood	Television film
2014–2016	The Musketeers	Milady de Winter	Series 1–3; 19 episodes
2016	DCI Banks	Tamsin Richards	Series 5; episodes 1–3, 5 & 6
2016	Grantchester	Linda Morgan	Series 3; Christmas Special
2018	Lore	Elizabeth Báthory	Season 2; episode 2: "Elizabeth Bathory: Mirror, Mirror"
2018	Agatha Raisin	Rosie Wilden	Series 2; episode 2: "The Fairies of Fryfam"
2019	London Kills	Grace Harper	Series 2; episodes 1, 3 & 5
2019	A Confession	DC Tracy Joyce	Mini-series; episodes 1–3 & 6
2020	White House Farm	Anji / Nancy Raynott	Mini-series; episodes 1, 4 & 5
2020-2025	All Creatures Great and Small	Dorothy	Series 1; episodes 2, 5 & 7 Series 6; episode 7
2020–2024	Van der Valk	Lucienne Hassell	Series 1–4; 12 episodes
2021	Midsomer Murders	Rowan Yarrow	Series 22; episode 1: "The Wolf Hunter of Little Worthy"
2025	The Couple Next Door	Gemma	Series 2; episodes 2–6

== Theatre ==
- The French Lieutenant's Woman, Richmond Theatre, October 2006 (playing Mary/Girl/Catherine)
