= Concert Artist Recordings =

Defunct British record label

- Founder: William Barrington-Coupe
- Status: Defunct
- Genre: classical music
- Country of origin: UK

Concert Artist/Fidelio Recordings was a British classical music record label, situated in Royston, Hertfordshire, England, and owned and operated by William Barrington-Coupe. It is best known for selling unauthorized copies of commercial recordings by other artists as the work of pianists Sergio Fiorentino and Barrington-Coupe's wife, Joyce Hatto. Barrington-Coupe's long history in the music world includes time with Saga Films and Records and pop record producer Joe Meek. The company issued recordings from 1955 until 2007.

== Fraudulent recordings ==
The Concert Artist label received increased attention in its final years as it released over 100 CDs of highly acclaimed piano recordings attributed to Joyce Hatto. After a great deal of speculation, discussion and allegations, on 26 February 2007 Barrington-Coupe admitted fraud and plagiarism regarding his recently deceased wife's recent recordings. Joyce Hatto CDs released by Concert Artist are in fact plagiarised commercial recordings by other pianists on different labels. Some light editing and processing had been made to the Concert Artist releases in an effort to disguise the original recordings origin.

Some of the Concert Artist recordings attributed to Sergio Fiorentino have also been positively identified as previously released commercial recordings by other pianists. The Concert Artist release of Chopin's Mazurkas attributed to Alfred Cortot has been the subject of continuing debate since before the "Hatto hoax". Subsequent analyses of the Cortot recordings have concluded that there are "ample grounds for suspicion" that the recordings are not authentic, but the actual source recording has never been identified.

== Featured artists ==
Wilhelm Backhaus, William Bennett, Alexander Brailowsky, Wolfgang Böhm, Ferruccio Busoni, Philip Challis, Leonard Cassini, Alfred Cortot, Adrian Creighton, Aeolian String Quartet, John Denman, Arthur Dennington, Ernst von Dohnányi, D’Oyly Carte Opera Company, English National Opera Orchestra, Sir Edward Elgar, Paula Fan, Albert Ferber, Sergio Fiorentino, Paul Freeman, Walter Gieseking, Grigory Ginsburg, Guildford Philharmonic Orchestra, Vernon Handley, Beatrice Harrison, Sir Hamilton Harty, Joyce Hatto, Henry Holst, Vladimir Horowitz, Edward Kilenyi, René Köhler (long suspected by many to be a fictitious conductor used for the misattributed Hatto recordings and now proven to be), London Mozart Ensemble, London Philharmonic Orchestra, Alan Loveday, Witold Malcuzynski, Mark Manning, Ozan Marsh, Frank Merrick, Benno Moiseiwitsch, Ignace Jan Paderewski, Sergei Rachmaninov, Royal Philharmonic Orchestra, Artur Rubinstein, Artur Schnabel, Albert Sammons, Oda Slobodskaya, Siegfried Schubert-Weber, Lionel Tertis, Rosemary Tuck, Nicholas Zumbro

== See also ==
- Lists of record labels
