= UN Chronicle =

Quarterly publication of the United Nations

The UN Chronicle is the digital magazine of the United Nations that furnishes a forum for exchange between experts and politicians working outside the Organization and United Nations officials and diplomats.

Produced by the Department of Global Communications, the magazine is simultaneously published in all six UN languages. The publication began its long run on 3 August 1946 as the United Nations Weekly Bulletin. Over the decades, the magazine evolved in focus and scope alongside the Organization it served, and by 1964 it had become the United Nations Monthly Chronicle. The most recent iteration of the print edition was published as a theme-based quarterly beginning in 2007. The magazine was moved to an all-digital format in 2019. The new, exclusively web-based UN Chronicle provides topical content supporting major United Nations conferences, international observances and institutional priorities, especially progress on the 2030 Agenda for Sustainable Development—all in the six United Nations official languages. The feature "Chronicle Conversations” showcases in-depth interviews with United Nations officials and other stakeholders.
