= Evgeny Zarafiants =

Russian pianist

Evgeny Zarafiants (born 1959 in Novosibirsk, Russian SFSR) is a pianist. He studied at the Glinka Conservatory in Gorky. Zarafiants later taught at the Conservatory in Nizhny Novgorod. His recordings include the Preludes of Alexander Scriabin and the keyboard sonatas of Domenico Scarlatti. In 1993, he was awarded joint-second prize at the Ivo Pogorelich International Solo Piano Competition at the Ambassador Auditorium in Pasadena, California.

== Discography ==
- Art & Music: Klimt - Music of His Time. Naxos
- Scarlatti: Keyboard Sonatas, Vol. 6. Naxos
- Scriabin: Preludes, Vol 1. Naxos
- Scriabin: Preludes, Vol. 2. Naxos
- Rachmaninov Piano Sonata No. 1, etc.. ALM Records
- Rachmaninov Piano Sonata No. 2, and preludes by Rachmaninov and Bach. ALM Records
- Beethoven: Piano Sonata No.14, 26 . Esoteric
- Chopin: Ballade No.1, Scherzo No.1, 2. Esoteric
