= Yuki Matsuzawa =

Japanese pianist (born 1958)

Yuki Matsuzawa 松澤 ゆき
- Born: August 22, 1958 (age 67); Tokyo, Japan
- Genres: Classical
- Occupation: Musician
- Instrument: Piano
- Labels: Pianissimo; Novalis

Yuki Matsuzawa (Japanese: 松澤 ゆき, Hepburn: Matsuzawa Yuki; born August 22, 1958 in Tokyo) is a Japanese pianist.

Matsuzawa is a pupil of Akiko Iguchi and Hiroshi Tamura at the Tokyo University of the Arts. She subsequently studied with Vladimir Ashkenazy. Matsuzawa was selected for the piano division of the Music Competition of Japan in 1979, and was a semifinalist of the Queen Elisabeth Competition in 1983.

Matsuzawa's recording of Frédéric Chopin's Études was the basis for one of the many plagiarised recordings issued under the name of Joyce Hatto. This plagiarised recording was hailed by the critic Ateş Orga as "... an extraordinary feat, poetically strong and frequently electrifying. Even (huskily) vocal. Here we have an artist at full throttle, high on adrenalin, technique gleaming, commanding a Rolls-Royce of an instrument firing on all cylinders." Reviewing the original recordings for the magazine Gramophone, Harriet Smith summed them up as "a very impressive achievement". In his 2023 review for Gramophone of the best recordings of Chopin's Études, the critic Jed Distler wrote, "As for Matsuzawa, what's not to love? You've got perfect fingerwork, fluent phrasing, impeccable timing, imaginative pedalling and discreetly novel voicings. There are no dead spots, no miscalculated tempos and no expressive tics. In other words, 'Joyce Hatto' at her best!" While Matsuzawa's recording of the études is out-of-print, Distler noted it is still available for download on Novalis.

The critic Lionel Salter, reviewing her debut recording of Alexander Scriabin in Gramophone, summed her up as "the most exciting newcomer this year to the record catalogue".
