= James Lock (sound engineer) =

Sound engineer

- Born: June 23, 1939; Bromley, South-East London, England
- Died: February 11, 2009 (aged 69)
- Occupations: Audio engineer (Chief Engineer for Decca Records), sound consultant
- Years active: 1956–2009; Key Productions: • Solti's Ring Cycle • Mehta's Turandot • Karajan's La Bohème • The Three Tenors
- Label: Decca Records
- Award: Grammy Award (1983, 1993)

James Lock (23 June 1939 – 11 February 2009) was an English sound engineer, who worked on recordings by many of the most celebrated and demanding figures in classical music. Most of his life he worked for Decca. He said he had always wanted to work for them — he joined them in 1963 and stayed for nearly 40 years.

== Biography ==
James Lock was born in Bromley, South-East London, England and educated at Canterbury Technical College. On leaving school he was about to join the Royal Navy but then changed his mind. He secured a traineeship at the International Broadcasting Company. After three years, he moved, in 1959, to Saga Records until he had to start National Service. Afterwards, he wrote to Decca and was accepted.

One of his first jobs was in John Culshaw's Decca team recording Solti's Ring Cycle in Vienna. He was closely involved in the development of stereo recording and made many highly regarded recordings, among them: Zubin Mehta’s Turandot with Joan Sutherland, Pavarotti Montserrat Caballe and the London Philharmonic Orchestra and von Karajan’s La Boheme (1972).From 1981, Lock supervised the production and tracking of the album Voyager One, an electronic music solo project Alpha Contact by artist and audio engineer Martin Ley. After Ley left Decca, they continued to work together on classical sessions. They used a NED Synclavier 9600 for the Third Act bells on Puccini's Tosca, added custom electronic instrumentation on Tchaikovsky's 1812 Overture, and used a Moog Memorymoog to record alternative French horn tracking requested by the production team.

He said the essentials of a good recording, in order, were "the work, the performance and then the sound". He was said to be able to judge a hall quickly just by clapping his hands. For this reason he was much in demand as a consultant for the renovation of concert halls. He also worked on one-off and outdoor venues, most famously the Three Tenors concert on the eve of the 1990 World Cup Final, which brought opera to the attention of many who had previously ignored it.

Winner of two Grammy Awards (one for Mahler's Ninth Symphony with Solti), Lock's recordings are known for being atmospheric, immersive and evocative, alongside intricate instrumentation.

After leaving Decca in 1997, as a consequence of the amazing job he did in Caracalla, Lock started a career as sound consultant for live amplified classical music performances and helped many outside venues to present symphonic music to the masses. In 2005, he helped the Portuguese Gulbenkian Orchestra with its summer outdoor performances.

Lock retired in 1999 but continued to work as a consultant. In June 2007, he joined the studio staff of Portuguese studio O Ganho do Som as resident engineer and consultant. In the summer of 2008, he started to write The Other Side of the Microphone, an autobiography about his Decca years and the human experience of recording great musicians.

In his spare time he was a keen gardener and competed in competitions. He was unmarried.
