= William Barrington-Coupe =

Welsh record producer (1931–2014)

- Also known as: Barry
- Born: William Halford Barrington Coupe; 1931; Llanelli
- Origin: United Kingdom
- Died: 19 October 2014 (aged 82–83) Royston, England
- Occupations: Record producer, music impresario

William H. Barrington-Coupe (born William Halford Barrington Coupe, 1931 – 19 October 2014 and known as Barry) was a British record producer and music impresario.

Married in 1956 to concert pianist Joyce Hatto, he was jailed for a year in 1966 for "blatant and impertinent frauds". He attained further notoriety in 2007 when he confessed that a large number of piano CDs that he had sold on his Concert Artist/Fidelio Recordings label were not in fact performed by his wife but were copies, in some cases digitally manipulated, of commercially available recordings by other pianists.

== Biography ==
Barrington-Coupe was born in Llanelli but grew up in Lewisham in London, where he worked as a classical musicians' agent in the early 1950s. In January 1952 he applied for a licence to carry on an employment agency for concert artists, and in October 1953 he promoted a concert at the Wigmore Hall by the pianist Gordon Rodda. A directory from 1953 to 1954 showed him with two exclusive artists on his books.

=== Concert Artists ===
Barrington-Coupe set up the record label Concert Artists in 1954 and released a few recordings of his own artists but mainly other recordings obtained under licence. A 1955 article in Billboard magazine refers to Barrington-Coupe as "President of Concert Artist Record Company, London", licensing Mozart recordings by the "London Mozart Ensemble". Concert Artists was compulsorily wound up 1956.

=== Saga Records and Triumph Records ===
Saga Films had been registered in 1955 by the British pianist Leonard Cassini but his interests soon turned to records. In 1958 he found financial backing from an entrepreneur, Wilfred Alonzo Banks (1913-83), who valued music primarily as a means to turn a fast buck. He did not pretend to know how to run a record label and evidently did not trust Cassini’s business acumen either, so by March 1958 he was employing Barrington-Coupe as his executive producer. At this time, orchestral recording in Britain was subject to strict union rules that made it prohibitively expensive for independent labels. In Hamburg, they found a custom recording service who provided session players drawn from local ensembles. Saga sent the pianists Sergio Fiorentino and Barrington-Coupe's newly-wed wife, Joyce Hatto, and sent its own engineer, James Lock, to the sessions. They also recorded in Copenhagen with pianist Eileen Joyce (1908-91) and the violinist Alan Loveday. Cassini persuaded Lazar Berman to make an LP while on a concert visit to London. Some Russian tapes were procured, so the public was offered quite a substantial selection of LPs, EPs and tapes when the first catalogue was published in September 1958. in 1959 a licensing deal for distribution in the USA was struck with Roulette, which had no classical titles of its own and created the Forum label specially for its acquisitions. (Roulette marketed the recording of Grieg’s Concerto made by Eileen Joyce as the work of Joyce Hatto.) By 1959 Barrington-Coupe was advertising recordings that had not yet been made including a Beethoven symphony cycle.

In February 1960, Barrington-Coupe and record producer Joe Meek (subsequently known for "Telstar", the 1962 hit by the Tornados) formed Triumph Records, intending to find a teenage market for pop singles. The two men later fell out and Meek left the company, which then went into liquidation.

Concert promotions of Saga recording artistes at the Royal Festival Hall and Wigmore Hall became an extravagant way of attracting attention. A complete Messiah in May 1960, further LPO sessions in June and a heavy schedule in Hamburg finally broke the bank. The Official Receiver held Barrington-Coupe responsible for the company’s collapse, and yet again he was left without a record label.

=== Delta Record Company ===
Somehow Barrington-Coupe retained the loyalty of his artists, most of whom were present when he resurfaced with the Delta Record Company in November 1961. His Summit label and Fidelio label ("the cheapest 12" LP in the world") were subsequently rejoined by Concert Artist, resurrected in 1966, and Revolution four years after that. Recordings of classical works issued on his Delta label were believed to have been copied from radio broadcasts from behind the Iron Curtain, mixed to disguise the sources. Private Eye has claimed that on one recording of Tchaikovsky's 4th Symphony, he made the mistake of inserting a number of bars backwards. A recording issued featuring the Danzig Philharmonic was in stereo, when it was known that that orchestra had ceased to exist a decade or more before stereo recording was common. He also made up artists' names: "Wilhelm Havagesse" was the falsely-named conductor of the "Zurich Municipal Orchestra" in a recording of Scheherazade released on Barrington-Coupe's Fidelio label in 1962 (ATL 4006). Charles Haynes, who worked with Barrington-Coupe at Delta, recounted that "quite often they used to 'monkey around', hence conductors Havagesse and Homer Lott and the soprano Herda Wobbel", lamenting that the practice stopped when "the Trades Descriptions Act threatened the continuing existence of these fine artists: 'End of the Road for Musician Havagesse' proclaimed the Daily Telegraph's headline."

'Havagesse' was a conductor whose name was fabricated by Barrington-Coupe (from 'have a guess', claims Simon Townley). The actual conductor and orchestra have not been identified.

=== Dial Records ===
The venture with Meek was followed by Dial Records, a label set up by 24 year old London-based David Gooch with the intent to promote undiscovered British talent. Dial produced a number of extended-play and long-playing records. This association was terminated when Barrington-Coupe had obvious financial difficulties.

=== WH Barrington-Coupe Ltd tax fraud ===
Desperate to make ends meet, he began importing radios from Hong Kong, which he sold in London markets and by mail order, but became the subject of legal action when he failed to pay purchase tax. On 17 May 1966, after what was then the longest-running and most expensive trial at the Old Bailey, costing the British taxpayer £150,000, Barrington-Coupe and four other defendants were found guilty of failing to pay £84,000 in purchase tax (over £1 million in 2007 currency). Barrington-Coupe was fined £3,600 and jailed for 12 months. His company, W.H. Barrington-Coupe Ltd, was fined £4,000 and finally wound up in 1971. Summing up, Judge Alan King-Hamilton said: "These were blatant and impertinent frauds, carried out in my opinion rather clumsily. But such was your conceit that you thought yourself smart enough to get away with it."

=== Concert Artists revived - the great piano swindle ===
After he was released from prison, Barrington-Coupe was reunited with Hatto. While she began to earn a modest reputation for her recitals of Liszt and Chopin, Barrington-Coupe maintained a lower profile. In the late 1970s, the couple disappeared from the public eye, becoming virtual recluses in their detached modern home in Royston, Hertfordshire.

It was not until 2002 that they were heard of again. During the previous 13 years they had apparently recorded another 103 CDs of Hatto's playing, which Barrington-Coupe began issuing on his Concert Artist label. In 2007, these CDs were found to be fraudulent copies of recordings of other artists issued by other labels. Barrington-Coupe initially denied any wrongdoing but subsequently admitted the fraud in a letter to Robert von Bahr, the head of the Swedish BIS record label that had originally issued some of the recordings plagiarised by Concert Artist. Bahr immediately shared the contents of the letter with Gramophone magazine, telling journalist Jessica Duchen afterwards that he "had given a lot of thought" to suing Barrington-Coupe for damages, but was inclined not to do so, on the assumption that the hoax recordings were "a desperate attempt to build a shrine to a dying wife".

== Death ==
Barrington-Coupe died aged 83 at home in Royston, Hertfordshire, on 19 October 2014.
