= Meir Panim =

Nonprofit organization based in Israel

Meir Panim is a nonprofit organization based in Israel, with branches in several cities. Hebrew for "brighten faces", Meir Panim was established to promote, support and further activities which are committed to providing both immediate and long-term relief to the impoverished- young and old alike- via a dynamic range of food and social service programs, all aimed at helping the needy with dignity and respect.

== Background ==
The organization was founded in 2000 with the goal of creating a "different' kind of soup kitchen, where those who come in feel like patrons at a restaurant, with no questions asked, and with the utmost dignity and respect.

Since then, Meir Panim has grown to a full social service operation, with multiple branches and services in partnership with local municipalities in order to offer a range of safety net opportunities to help those in need get back on their feet and break the cycle of poverty. Initiatives include job training and educational workshops for youths and adults.

The organization's annual budget in 2017 was around £5.6 million (around US$7.25 million).

=== Programs ===
Meir Panim operates a diverse group of programs dedicated to tackling a wide-range of issues those in need may face, to help break the cycle of poverty. Programs include:

- A network of Free Restaurant-Style Soup Kitchens
- Meals-on-Wheels
- Neighborhood Youth Centers
- Holocaust Survivor Day Center
- Pre-paid food shopping card distribution
- Meals for children
- Holiday food package distributions
- Power of Giving
- Challah for Shabbat

=== Branches ===
The organization's operates in a number of cities across the country, including Jerusalem, Tzfat, Dimona, Or Akiva, Tiberias and Sderot.

Several branches have formed to raise funds from the Jewish Diaspora, including the American Friends of Meir Panim (AFMP) in the United States and Manna UK in the United Kingdom, Friends of Meir Panim in France, and operations in Canda, Switzerland and Australia as well.
