= Sergio Fiorentino =

Italian pianist (1927–1998)

- Born: 22 December 1927; Naples, Italy
- Died: 22 August 1998 (aged 70) Naples, Italy
- Genre: Classical
- Occupations: Pianist, pedagogue
- Instrument: Piano
- Years active: 1947–1998
- Labels: Delta, Fidelio, Concert Artists, Saga, APR, Aldilà, Brilliant Classics, Fabula Classica, Piano Classics, Rhine Classics

Sergio Fiorentino (22 December 1927 – 22 August 1998) was an Italian classical pianist whose sporadic performing career spanned five decades. There is quite a bit of footage of his playing that survives, in addition to audio recordings. Recently, a complete concert recorded on video in 1994 has surfaced.

== Biography ==
Fiorentino was born in Naples and studied at the Conservatorio San Pietro a Majella in Naples under Luigi Finizio and Paolo Denza, earned his diploma in 1946 and attended a master class of Carlo Zecchi in Salzburg in 1948. At the age of 20, in 1947 he won a piano competition in Monza, whose jury was chaired by Arturo Benedetti Michelangeli. There is a legend that Michelangeli himself would later say about him: "He is the only other pianist." His debut was at Carnegie Recital Hall, New York in 1953. The following year, while on tour in Argentina and Uruguay, he was in a near-fatal plane accident, forcing him to cut back on concert performances. This led to his becoming a teacher at Naples Conservatory, where he had once been a student.

In the late 1950s, he made a new start in concert performances, both in his native country and in England. Many of his recordings were made during those years (1958–1965). But again, he withdrew from the concert stage, limiting his rare public appearances to his native country, and again started to regularly teach master classes.

He left Naples Conservatory in 1993 and began again to play more in public outside his native Italy, performing in Germany, France, Taiwan and the United States. He also made a series of recordings for Appian Publications & Recordings (APR) in Berlin during four sessions between 1994 and 1997. An augmented 10-CD set of these recordings was issued by Piano Classics in 2011. Negotiated and contracted engagements in Russia and Canada as well as a scheduled fifth recording session for APR could not be fulfilled due to his sudden death in his home in Naples on 22 August 1998.

== Fraud with Concert Artists label ==
Beginning in 1994 through after his death in 1998, a large number of recordings by Fiorentino were released. Recordings made in Berlin from 1994 to 1997 were released on APR whereas earlier unissued material was put out by the Concert Artists label. In February 2007, Concert Artists admitted to falsely attributing music recorded by others to the late Joyce Hatto. Subsequently, a CD of mazurkas by Fiorentino produced by Concert Artists (CACD9002-2) has been found to contain plagiarised tracks from three other performers.

Some of Fiorentino's recordings made during the late fifties and early sixties were issued after the original label's (Saga) failure under pseudonyms by the new owner (Marcel Rodd). The most frequently used pseudonym was "Paul Procopolis".

== Discography – CD ==
=== Aldilà Records ===
- AHCD003 | 2CD | Sergio Fiorentino - Live in Concert on Érard | ℗ & © 2012 | Bach: French Suite No.5 BWV 815; Franck: Prélude, Aria et Final; Schubert: Impromptu Op.90/2; Piano Sonata No.21 D960; Chopin: Waltzes Op.18; Op.64/2; R.Strauss/O.Singer/S.Fiorentino: Rosenkavalierswalzer

=== Appian Publications & Recordings | Fiorentino Edition ===
- APR 5552 | I - Scriabin - Rachmaninov - Prokofiev | ℗ & © 1996 | Scriabin: Sonata No.2 op.19; Rachmaninov: Sonata No.2 op.36; Prokofiev: Sonata No.8 op.84 (rec: Siemensvilla, Berlin, 8.X.1994)
- APR 5553 | II - Chopin - Schubert | ℗ & © 1997 | Chopin: Sonata No.3 op.58; Schubert: Sonata No.21 D 960 (rec: Siemensvilla, Berlin, 8-9.X.1994)
- APR 5556 | III - Scriabin - Rachmaninov | ℗ & © 1997 | Scriabin: Sonata No.1 op.6 - Sonata No.4 op.30; Rachmaninov: Sonata No.1 op.28 (rec: Siemensvilla, Berlin, 14-15.X.1995)
- APR 5558 | IV - Bach (Vol.1) | ℗ & © 1998 | Johann Sebastian Bach: Partita No.1 BWV 825; Violin Sonata No.1 BWV 1001 (Transcr. by Fiorentino); Partita No.4 BWV 828 (rec: Siemensvilla, Berlin, 19.X.1996)
- APR 5559 | V - Bach (Vol.2) | ℗ & © 1998 | Johann Sebastian Bach: Prelude and Fugue BWV 532 (Transcr. by Busoni/Fiorentino); French Suite No.5 BWV 816; Suite from Violin Partita No.3 BWV 1006 (Transcr. by Rachmaninoff); Jesu, Joy of man's desiring (Transcr. by Fiorentino); Prelude and Fugue BWV 552 "St.Anne" (Transcr. by Busoni/Fiorentino) (rec: Siemensvilla, Berlin, X.1996)
- APR 5560 | VI - Schumann | ℗ & © 2001 | Robert Schumann: Fantasy in C Major op.17; Arabeske op.18; Novellette op.21/1; Sonata No.2 in G minor op.22; Romanze op.28/2; "Die Lotosblume" op.25/7 - "Widmung" op.25/1 (Arr. by Fiorentino) (rec: Siemensvilla, Berlin, 14-19.X.1996)
- APR 5561 | VII - Schubert | ℗ & © 2003 | Franz Schubert: Sonata No.13 in A major D 664; 4 Impromptus Op.90/D 899; Sonata No.4 in A minor D 537 (rec: Siemensvilla, Berlin, 20.X.1996; 18.X.1997 [Op.90])
- APR 5562 | VIII - Liszt | ℗ & © 2004 | Franz Liszt: Ballades No.1 & No.2; Funérailles; La Leggierezza; Waldesrauschen; Sonata in B minor (rec: Siemensvilla, Berlin, 18-19.X.1997)
- APR 5563 | IX - Franck | ℗ & © 2005 | César Franck: Prélude, Fugue et Variation op.18 (Transcr. by Harold Bauer); Prélude, Choral et Fugue; Danse Lente; Prélude, Aria et Final (Recorded: 8.X.1995 [Prel-Choral-Fugue]; 14.X.1995)

(Voll. I-IX reprint in: Piano Classics - Fiorentino Edition Vol.1 "The Berlin Recordings" 10CD ℗ & © 2011)

- APR 5581 | The Early Recordings Vol.1 | ℗ & © 1999 | The Contemplative Liszt
- APR 5582 | The Early Recordings Vol.2 | ℗ & © 1999 | The Virtuoso Liszt
- APR 5583 | The Early Recordings Vol.3 | ℗ & © 2000 | Liszt: Années de Pèlerinage Vol. I Suisse
- APR 5584 | The Early Recordings Vol.4 | ℗ & © 2002 | Liszt: The Orchestral Recordings

(Voll.1-4 reprint in: Piano Classics - Fiorentino Edition Vol.2 "The Complete Liszt Recordings" 6CD ℗ & © 2012)

- APR 5585 | The Early Recordings Vol.5 | ℗ & © 2006 | Rachmaninoff: 24 Preludes

(Vol.5 reprint in: Piano Classics - Fiorentino Edition Vol.3 "Rachmaninoff" 2CD ℗ & © 2014)

- APR 5586 | The Early Recordings Vol.6 | ℗ & © 2008 | Schumann: Carnaval; Kinderszenen; Arabeske; Symphonic Etudes

(Vol.6 reprint in: Piano Classics - Fiorentino Edition Vol.4 "Early Recordings 1953-1966" 10CD ℗ & © 2016)

- APR 7036 | 2CD | In Germany • 1993 Live Recordings | ℗ & © 1995 | Bach/Busoni/Fiorentino: Prelude & Fugue BWV.532; Beethoven: Sonata No.31 op.110; Chopin: Sonata No.2 op.35; Scriabin: Sonata No.4 op.30; Schumann: Fantasie op.17; Liszt/Gounod: Valse de l'Opéra Faust; J.Strauss/Tausig: "Man Lebt Nur Einmal!" (Caprice Waltz); J.Strauss/Godowsky: Die Fledermaus (Symphonische Metamorphosen); Chopin: Waltz No.1 op.18; Tchaikovsky/Fiorentino: Waltz op.40/8; Chopin: Waltz No.7 op.64/2; Brahms/Fiorentino: Liebesliederwalzer op.52 (reissue: 2CD APR 6034 ℗ 2021)

=== Brilliant Classics | Sergio Fiorentino: The Legacy ===
This collection contains exactly the same material as the previous editions Piano Classics Voll.1-4, except the 5 Rachmaninoff transcriptions present on Vol.3, CD2 (track [7] "Daisies", [8] "Lilacs", [9] "Vocalise", [10] Kreisler: "Liebesleid", [10] Mendelssohn: Scherzo from "Midsummer Night's Dream") recorded in Paris, Salle Wagram on 30 May 1962, which are missing.

- 26 CD box | cat. nr. 97423 | ℗ & © 2025

=== Ermitage - Fabula Classica ===
- FAB 29902-2 | 2CD | Piano Recitals 1962-1987 - Unreleased Broadcasts | Claude Debussy: Estampes - D'un Cahier d'Esquisses - Masques - L'Isle Joyeuse - Images I - Images II; Robert Schumann: Kreisleriana op.16; Maurice Ravel: Menuet sur le nom de Haydn - Prélude - A la manière de Borodine - Valses Nobles et Sentimentales - Gaspard de la nuit | ℗ & © 2001
- FAB 29908-2 | Piano Concertos 1959-1972 - Unreleased Broadcasts | Ferruccio Busoni: Indianische Fantasie op.44; Alfredo Casella: Scarlattiana; Emilia Gubitosi: Piano Concerto | ℗ & © 2003

=== Piano Classics | Fiorentino Edition ===
This edition contains the whole material previously released by APR plus a 10th CD in Vol.1 "The Berlin Recordings" (Debussy, Scarlatti, Moszkovski, Fauré, Schumann, Liszt), 5 Rachmaninoff transcriptions on Vol.3 ("Daisies", "Lilacs", "Vocalise" -Transcr. By Fiorentino, 1962-, Kreisler: "Liebesleid", Mendelssohn: Scherzo from "Midsummer Night's Dream") and more material released for the first time on CD in Vol.4 "Early Recordings 1953-1966".

- PCLM0033 | 10CD | Vol.1 | Sergio Fiorentino - The Berlin Recordings | ℗ & © 2011
- PCLM0041 | 6CD | Vol.2 | Sergio Fiorentino - The Complete Liszt Recordings | ℗ & © 2012
- PCLD0065 | 2CD | Vol.3 | Sergio Fiorentino - Rachmaninoff | ℗ & © 2014
- PCLM0104 | 10CD | Vol.4 | Sergio Fiorentino - Early Recordings 1953-1966 | ℗ & © 2016

=== Rhine Classics | Sergio Fiorentino Edition ===
This collection comprehensively represent mainly all the significant "non-commercial" recordings left by Fiorentino (from his private archive), and the complete SAGA album collection.

- RH-006 | 6CD | Sergio Fiorentino -1- complete Rachmaninoff live 1987 | ℗ & © 2018 | complete solo piano works + Paganini Rhapsody, Piano Concerto No.1, Vocalise
- RH-009 | 1CD | Sergio Fiorentino -2- live in Taiwan 1998| ℗ & © 2018 | works by: Bach-Busoni, Beethoven, Scriabin, Rachmaninoff, Mendelssohn
- RH-015 | 9CD | Sergio Fiorentino -3- live in USA 1996-97-98 | ℗ & © 2020 | works by: Albéniz, Bach, Beethoven, Brahms, Chopin, Franck, Godowsky, Liszt, Mendelssohn, Moszkowski, Rachmaninoff, Schubert, Schumann, Scriabin, R.Strauss, Tausig, Tchaikovsky
- RH-026 | 1CD | Sergio Fiorentino -4- early live & unissued takes | ℗ & © 2022 | works by: Bach, Chopin, Liszt & Rachmaninoff Piano Concerto No.4
- RH-033 | 10CD | Sergio Fiorentino -5- the complete SAGA album collection | ℗ & © 2025 | works by: Beethoven, Chopin, Gershwin, Liszt, Schumann, Tchaikovsky

== Podcasts ==
- The Fiorentino Saga The Piano Maven with Jed Distler (© 2025 by Jed Distler)
