= Johnny Silvo =

- Johnny Silvo, British folk and blue's singer in 1998

Background information
- Born: John Frederick Woods; 2 December 1936; England
- Died: 19 December 2011 Norway
- Genres: Folk music, blues
- Occupations: Musician, singer, TV presenter
- Formerly of: Johnny Silvo Folk Group

Johnny Silvo (born John Frederick Woods; 2 December 1936 – 19 December 2011) was a British folk and blues singer and TV presenter.

== Biography ==
Silvo was born in 1936 to an Irish mother and an African-American father, who was serving in Ireland. He started his career playing skiffle and jazz and singing solo in nightclubs. When the folk scene took off in the 60s he became a popular guest act at folk clubs.

In March 1967 he appeared with his own Johnny Silvo Folk Group on the Alex Campbell and His Friends LP alongside Sandy Denny. A month later an LP called Sandy and Johnny was released in which the two singers alternated songs. Silvo also performed for nine years as part of a duo with Dave Moses.

Johnny was also a presenter on Play School in the early 1970s.

Silvo continued to tour until 2011 when he was forced to cancel his autumn tour because of cancer.

== Personal life ==
Johnny Silvo was married to Berit. They have a son together named Patrick.

Silvo died on 19 December 2011 aged 75, a few weeks after his birthday.

== Discography ==
- Alex Campbell and His Friends (1967, compilation, with the Johnny Silvo Folk Group)
- Sandy & Johnny (1967, with Sandy Denny)
- Live from London (1973, with Dave Moses)
- Time Enough to Spare (1977)
- In The Spotlight - "Live In Concert" (1983)
- Midnight Special (1998, with Arvid Lone)
- Blues in the Backyard (1999, with Diz Disley)
- I'll Fly Away (2006)
