= Alex Campbell (singer) =

Scottish folk singer

Alex Campbell (27 April 1931 – 3 January 1987) was a Scottish folk singer whose nickname was "Big Daddy". He was influential in the British folk revival of the 1950s and 1960s, and was one of the first folk singers in modern times to tour the UK and Europe. He was described by Colin Harper as a "melancholic, hard-travelling Glaswegian" and was known for his story-telling and singing

== Early life ==
Campbell was born in Glasgow, Scotland, to a family who originated in the Hebrides. His parents and two sisters died from tuberculosis in the same year, and Campbell spent time in an orphanage before being taken in by his grandmother. During World War II, he met American, Polish and Australian servicemen who were based in Glasgow and developed an interest in the songs they sang.

After leaving school, he began a career in the Civil Service, but left after an incident in which he lost his temper. He enrolled, apparently on a whim, on a course at the Sorbonne in Paris, France, but ran out of money and busked to support himself, playing guitar and singing Lead Belly songs and Scottish folk songs. It has been claimed that he pretended to be a blind blues singer with a white stick.

== Performing career ==
In Paris, Campbell met American folk musician Derroll Adams, who found him a regular engagement playing in a café, although he also continued busking. He made regular return trips to Britain in the 1950s, appearing at Alexis Korner's Blues and Barrelhouse Club, and other skiffle and folk music venues which were opening around the country. In Paris, a new generation of folk musicians, such as Davey Graham and Wizz Jones, followed in his footsteps.

Campbell became involved in the folk music revival in London and met Ewan MacColl, who was influential in the movement. The two men disagreed on their approaches to folk music; MacColl took a purist view that people should only sing music from their regional background, whereas Campbell had an eclectic repertoire and sang whatever he liked, whether it was a Scottish Ballad, an English folksong or an American work song. A contemporary article in The Observer attempted to divide the folk community into two camps, the "MacCollites" and the "Campbellites".

MacColl, who was married to Jean Newlove, fell in love with Peggy Seeger. In 1958, with Seeger having no UK work permit, Alex Campbell undertook a marriage of convenience to enable her to stay in the country and, on 24 January 1959, Campbell and Seeger were married in Paris. Seeger's USA passport had been withdrawn and this marriage saved her from being deported. According to Seeger, it was "a platonic relationship". She has described the wedding ceremony as "hilarious"—at the time, she was seven months pregnant with Ewan MacColl's child, and the officiating priest lectured Campbell about his forthcoming lifetime commitment to "the poor girl whom he had got into so much trouble". The following day, Seeger returned to London and settled down with MacColl.

Campbell settled down with his eventual wife, Patsy, and they had two sons. By 1961, Campbell was playing folk clubs in London, including Les Cousins, and appeared several times, on and off stage, at Robin Hall and Jimmie Macgregor's London Folk Song Cellar on the BBC. He toured Germany several times and other parts of Europe. For several years he lived in Denmark, first in Skagen and later in Tonder. In the early 1980s, Campbell was diagnosed with throat cancer and struggled to speak. He died of tuberculosis in Denmark on 3 January 1987.

== Recording career ==
Campbell recorded more than 100 records but was not commercially successful, perhaps as a result of his troubadour lifestyle, as well as his preference for expressiveness as opposed to being "technically perfect". Campbell recorded quickly, in the style of most early American Bluesmen, and more famously, Bob Dylan. His love for a wide range of music, coupled with his generosity towards young, unknown talent, resulted in albums which were diverse in nature and rich in instrumentation. Backing musicians included Martin Carthy (Transatlantic recordings), Gerry Loughran (usually spelled "Lockran"), Royd Rivers, Dave Laibman and Ian McCann.

Campbell's early recordings included many American folk songs. His later repertoire included Scots dialect songs, big ballads and erotic songs. He also sang Woody Guthrie, Bob Dylan, and Tom Paxton songs while accompanying himself on guitar. His 1967 album, Alex Campbell and His Friends, contained three songs on which Sandy Denny took the lead, and were the earliest available professional recordings of Denny.

In 1976, Campbell made an album of Scots songs with Alan Roberts and Dougie MacLean. In the same year, the album entitled Big Daddy of Folk Music was recorded with the Tannahill Weavers. He released two albums featuring Phil Beer and Paul Downes entitled No Regrets and Traditional Ballads of Scotland.

His 1979 album, Det er godt at se dig (It's good to see you), was recorded in Denmark and featured Danish musicians including Niels Hausgaard. The album's title track was written by Allan Taylor. The song became a favourite in Denmark and Germany and became synonymous with Campbell. It was at least the fourth album he had recorded with Danish musicians. Almost 15 years earlier, he had recorded In Copenhagen for the Storyville label. This was followed by At The Tivoli Gardens, which showcased the work of other writers including Anne Briggs, Bob Dylan, Tom Paxton, and Paul Simon.

Campbell's legacy to the world of traditional music was also in his work as a performing artist, where he would captivate and enthrall with his strong and charismatic presence. His albums contained production values and musicality which was unusual in traditional albums, and these studio albums demonstrated his ability to arrange and work with groups of skilled musicians.

== Recognition ==
In 1986, Rab Noakes wrote the song "Gently Does It" as a tribute to Campbell, contrasting his powerful presence with the realities of his illness, and expressing a wish for him to slow down. The song included the line "And a few years ago you'd been on this road so long", referencing Campbell's best known song. The singer-songwriter Allan Taylor wrote: "Alex Campbell was the most important and influential folk singer of the folksong revival in Europe, admired, respected and loved by his fellow performers and his audiences. An outrageous, hard drinking, hard travelling, hard living man." Musician and comedian Billy Connolly wrote in his autobiography of his admiration for Campbell, who would often tell stories about himself that were self-deprecating and humorous.

In 1997, Allan Taylor issued the double-album The Alex Campbell Tribute Concert, which was recorded at the Skagen Festival in Denmark on 2 July 1995.

Re-released albums by Campbell are still available.

== Select album discography ==
- 1958: Chansons populaires des États-Unis
- 1963: The Best Loved Songs of Bonnie Scotland
- 1963: Way Out West
- 1963: An Alex Campbell Folk Session
- 1964: Alex Campbell
- 1965: Alex Campbell, Colin Wilkie and Shirley Hart Sing Folk
- 1965: Alex Campbell in Copenhagen
- 1966: Yours Aye – Alex
- 1967: Alex Campbell at the Tivoli Gardens
- 1967: Alex Campbell and His Friends
- 1968: Alex Campbell Live
- 1968: The Scottish Breakaway
- 1969: Alex Campbell Sampler
- 1971: This is Alex Campbell, Vol. 1
- 1971: This is Alex Campbell, Vol. 2
- 1972: Alex Campbell at His Best
- 1972: Life is Just That Way
- 1975: Goodbye Booze
- 1976: Big Daddy of Folk Music
- 1976: No Regrets
- 1977: Traditional Ballads of Scotland
- 1979: Det er godt at se dig
- 1979: Live and Studio
- 1979: C-R-M (Alex Campbell-Alan Roberts-Dougie MacLean)
- 1981: Live in Belgium
- 1987: Alex Campbell – With the Greatest Respect
- 2005: Been On The Road So Long (The Alex Campbell Anthology)
