= Alan Loveday =

- Born: Alan Raymond Loveday; 29 February 1928; Palmerston North, New Zealand
- Died: 12 April 2016 (aged 88)
- Genres: Classical
- Instrument: Violin
- Years active: 1932–1993
- Formerly of: Royal Philharmonic Orchestra; Academy of St Martin in the Fields

Alan Raymond Loveday (29 February 1928 – 12 April 2016) was a New Zealand violinist. A child prodigy, he became leader of the Royal Philharmonic Orchestra, and a soloist and leader with the Academy of St Martin in the Fields. He was a professor at the Royal College of Music for 17 years from 1955. Loveday married pianist Ruth Stanfield in 1952, and they had two children, including Ian Loveday.
