= Xavier & Ophelia (album) =

Studio album by Xavier and Ophelia
- Released: April 1, 2011
- Genre: Rock, Pop
- Length: 33:19
- Label: Real Life Music, Blue Pie Distribution
- Producer: Dave Tough

Xavier and Ophelia chronology
Xavier & Ophelia (2011)	I Hate Birds (2012)

Xavier & Ophelia, also referenced to as X&O, is a studio album by Xavier and Ophelia. Released on April 1, 2011, by Real Life Music, it was produced by band member Dave Tough. Seven of the nine songs on the album are original, excluding covers of Kings of Leon's song “Use Somebody” and Jackson C. Frank’s folk song “Milk & Honey.” At the 2011 International Songwriting Competition the band was a semi-finalist with the album's song “Six Billion Lonely People,” and the song was a finalist in the 2012 Songdoor Songwriting Competition as well.

== Production ==
The album was produced by band member Dave Tough, with both members of Xavier and Ophelia contributing to the songwriting. Seven of the nine songs on the album are original, excluding covers of Kings of Leon's song “Use Somebody” and Jackson C. Frank’s folk song “Milk & Honey.” Their song “Six Billion Lonely People” had been written with the assistance of John Foster, also known for playing with the Beach Boys in the early 2000s.

== Release ==
The duo released their first album, Xavier & Ophelia, on April 1, 2011, on Real Life Music and Blue Pie Distribution. For a time the album's track "Six Billion Lonely People" was in rotation on the BBS Radio 24 hour music station, and in 2011 the band was an SGX Radio featured artist.

Awards

At the 2011 International Songwriting Competition the band was a semi-finalist with “Six Billion Lonely People,” and the song was a finalist in the 2012 Songdoor Songwriting Competition as well. "Last Recorded Summer," a pop song on the album written by Moore, Tough, and Neil Barber, was nominated in the Indie International Songwriting Contest, and was also a finalist in the UK Songwriting Competition.

== Critical reception ==
"Romance is definitely her style, and Moore’s delicate soprano is feminine-alluring to the hilt. She’s light as air a la Olivia Newton-John on 'I’m Alright,' and a little less breathy, showing her strength on the catchy dance pop 'Chateau Marmont,' bringing to mind Danish pop band The Asteroids Galaxy Tour’s Mette Lindberg. 'Last Recorded Summer' has a retro-‘60s commercial melody that suits her misty voice, and piano ballad 'Heartbeat' has all that edgy synth softened by a warm, honest performance."
— Music News Nashville (2011)

The album met with a largely positive reception among critics. According to Anna Maria Stjärnell of Luna Kafé e-zine, "Their debut is mellow and mostly very touching pop." Music News Nashville called the album an "unlikely blend of electronica, classic pop melodies and delicate vocal deliveries." It also praised the production, stating "techno beats, computerized sounds, live instruments and lovely, layered vocals mixed together put a unique stamp on their clean productions."

About "Milk & Honey," Music News Nashville stated "Moore and Tough give a haunting, cinematic feel to their version."

Music Think Tank described the song "Six Billion Lonely People" as "Electronic pop with acoustic elements and classic melodies reminiscent of Imogen Heap and Goldfrapp, featuring the breathy and angelic voice of DeAnna Moore." According to Luna Kafé e-zine, the song "uses Moore's vocals well, recalling Edie Brickell at her best." About other tracks, "'Chateau Marmont' is a catchy number that recalls Saint Etienne in its summery haze. 'Passing Train' is equally lovely, a folksy melody setting the scene for a lullaby in blue." Also, "Use Somebody" is "presented here as a neon-bright dance track."

== Track listing ==
No.	Title	Writer(s)	Length
1.	"6 Billion Lonely People"	J. Foster	4:04
2.	"I'm Alright"	C. Morgan	3:27
3.	"Chateau Marmont"	C. Morgan	3:38
4.	"Last Recorded Summer"		2:54
5.	"Passing Train"	C. Morgan	2:05
6.	"Heartbeat"		3:48
7.	"Use Somebody"	Kings of Leon	3:31
8.	"Jack And Jill"		4:47
9.	"Milk & Honey"	Jackson C. Frank	5:05

== Singles ==
Singles on Xavier and Ophelia
Year	Title	Certifications
2011	"Six Billion Lonely People"	Music video
2011	"Last Recorded Summer"	
2011	"I'm Alright"	Music video
2011	"Passing Train"	Music video

=== Awards ===
Year	Award	Nominated work	Category	Result
2011	UK Songwriting Competition	"Last Recorded; Summer"	Best Song	Finalist
2011	Indie International Songwriting Contest	"Last Recorded; Summer"	Best Song	Finalist
2011	International Songwriting Competition	"Six Billion; Lonely People"	Best Song	Semi-finalist
2012	Songdoor Songwriting Competition	"Six Billion; Lonely People"	Best Song	Finalist

== Personnel ==
- Dave Tough - producer, primary artist
- DeAnna Moore - primary artist
- J. Foster - composer
