= Santa Barbara Honeymoon =

Studio album by Bert Jansch
- Released: October 1975
- Recorded: c. April–June 1975
- Studio: Sound City, Van Nuys, California
- Genre: Folk
- Label: Charisma
- Producer: Danny Lane

Bert Jansch chronology
L.A. Turnaround (1974)	Santa Barbara Honeymoon (1975)	A Rare Conundrum (1977)

Santa Barbara Honeymoon is the tenth album by Scottish folk musician Bert Jansch, released in 1975.

== Track listing ==
All tracks composed by Bert Jansch; except where indicated

1. "Love Anew"
2. "Mary and Joseph"
3. "Be My Friend"
4. "Baby Blue"
5. "Dance Lady Dance"
6. "You Are My Sunshine" (Jimmie Davis, Charles Mitchell)
7. "Lost and Gone"
8. "Blues Run the Game" (Jackson C. Frank)
9. "Build Another Band"
10. "When the Teardrops Fell"
11. "Dynamite"
12. "Buckrabbit"

=== 2009 Remaster ===
Same as the original LP release, with the following bonus tracks:

1. "Build Another Band" (Alternate Version)
2. "When The Teardrops Fell" (Live at Montreux 4 July 1975)
3. "Lady Nothing" (Live at Montreux 4 July 1975)
4. "Dance Lady Dance" (Live at Montreux 4 July 1975)
5. "Angie" (Live at Montreux 4 July 1975)
6. "One for Jo" (Live at Montreux 4 July 1975)

== Personnel ==
- Bert Jansch - vocals, guitars
- Jim Baker - guitar
- Jay Lacy - electric guitar
- Bill Smith - keyboards
- David Barry - keyboards
- George Seymour - synthesizer
- Robert Greenidge - steel drums
- Don Whaley - bass
- Ernie McDaniel - bass
- David Hungate - bass
- Danny Lane - drums
- Tris Imboden - drums
- Craig Buhler, Darrell Leonard, Jim Gordon - brass
- Beth Fitchet Wood, Ron McGuire, Steve Wood - vocals

Technical

- Bill Drescher, Chris Houston - engineer
- Phyliss Nesmith - production coordinator
