= Martha Marcy May Marlene (soundtrack) =

Martha Marcy May Marlene (Original Motion Picture Soundtrack)

Film score by Danny Bensi and Saunder Jurrians
- Released: October 11, 2011
- Recorded: 2010–2011
- Genre: Film score
- Length: 35:31
- Label: Fox Music
- Producer: Danny Bensi; Saunder Jurrians

Danny Bensi and Saunder Jurrians chronology
The Strange Ones (2010)	Martha Marcy May Marlene (2011)	Play (2011)

Martha Marcy May Marlene (Original Motion Picture Soundtrack) is the soundtrack to the film of the same name. The original score is composed by Danny Bensi and Saunder Jurrians in their feature film debut and featured 13 tracks, released by Fox Music on October 11, 2011.

== Development ==
Daniel Bensi and Saunder Jurrians composed the film score. The film was their sophomore composition for a feature film after Two Gates of Sleep (2010). The duo met directors Antonio Campos and Josh Mond, whose production company Borderline Films funded the project. After likening their score for Two Gates of Sleep and their works on the band Priestbird, they offered to score for the film, which they agreed. The score was recorded with a $300 microphone and a laptop in Jurrians' bedroom which was devoid of soundproofing. Due to the snowy weather, the slush under the cars driving were heard in the recording.

Durkin had written for a sequence where Patrick (John Hawkes) sings a love song to Martha (Elizabeth Olsen), but he did not have any idea for the film's songs. He chose numerous songs that matched the names of the characters of the film and compiled a huge playlist that included the names that matched with the film's title. He picked one of the songs written by American folk musician Jackson C. Frank, named "Marlene" as he liked the track after first listen and used in the end credits. He would later bring his eponymous album that also had the track "Marcy's Song". He then gave him the cords and lyrics of the song to Hawkes, who spent a couple of weeks playing it, though Durkin did not listen until the film's shooting. It had Hawkes' own rendition, which was different from the actual recording, which he claimed as his "favorite parts in the film". A music video featuring Hawkes' performing the song was released on October 21.

== Track listing ==
No.	Title	Artist(s)	Length
1.	"Pulse 1"		0:46
2.	"Collage"		3:01
3.	"Divergence 1"		2:36
4.	"Ba Bop Bop Bop / Marcy's Song"	Brady Corbet, Christopher Abbott and John Hawkes	2:48
5.	"Waiting / Divergence 2"	Devon Anderson	3:04
6.	"Die Cat Die / Mirror Mirror"		3:00
7.	"Weekend Homes"	Abbott	3:09
8.	"Screaming on the Inside / Swarm"	Anderson	2:53
9.	"Convergence"		4:39
10.	"Pulse 2"		0:21
11.	"Break In / The Watcher"		5:06
12.	"Soft Swarm"		0:24
13.	"Marlene"	Hawkes	3:44
Total length:			35:31

== Reception ==
Anthony Kaufman of Screen praised the sound design and musical choices, calling it "equally bold, from a highly dissonant arrangement when Martha has a breakdown to ominous hums, percussive beats and the faint sounds of bees buzzing somewhere deep in the forest". Alonso Durande of TheWrap wrote "Daniel Bensi and Saunder Jurriaans' score keeps the tension coming; they know how to turn one long, extended cello note into a symphony of unease." Richard Propes of The Independent Critic wrote "heightens the film's emotional impact while also adding immensely to the sensory experience." Hoberman J. of Riverfront Times wrote "The spare, angsty score by Saunder Jurriaans and Danny Bensi is as ominous as distant thunder." James Rocchi of IndieWire wrote "The score by Saunder Jurriaans and Danny Bensi is also a highlight of the film, electronic droning and slow notes reaching crescendos of intensity that become almost unbearable before snapping back to a silence fraught with the tension of what can happen next." Peter Debruge of Variety described the score "cacophonous".

== Accolades ==
The score was considered to be one of the 97 contenders for Academy Award for Best Original Score at the 84th Academy Awards, but was not nominated.

Award	Category	Recipient(s) and nominee(s)	Result	Ref.
International Film Music Critics Association	Best Original Score for a Drama Film	Danny Bensi and Saunder Jurriaans	Nominated	
