= Transportation in Buffalo, New York =

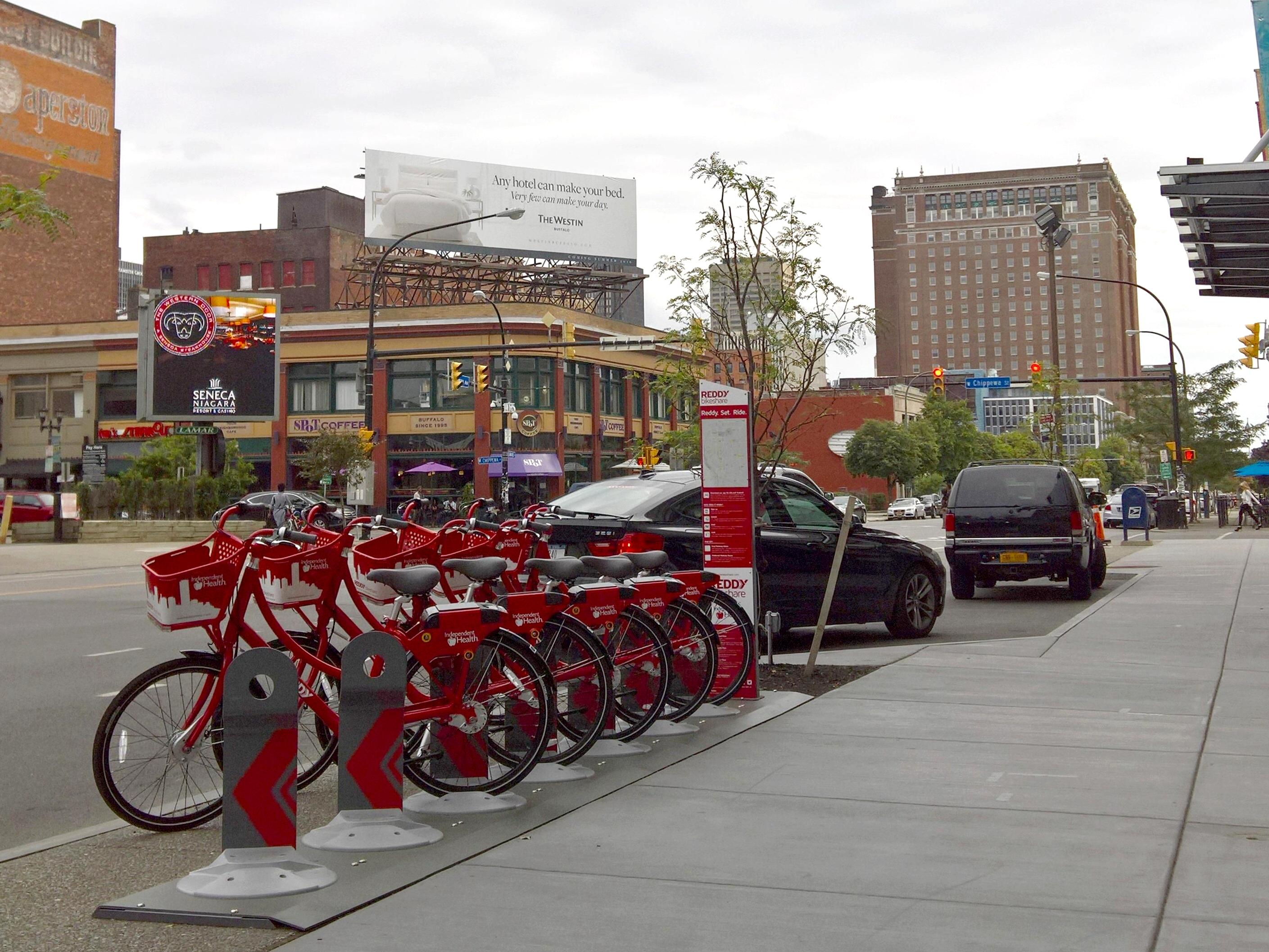
Reddy bike share

Transportation in Buffalo, New York is dominated by automobile use, but other modes of transportation exist in the city.

The Erie Canal made Buffalo a major port. Railroads including the New York Central confirmed its status.

== Airports ==
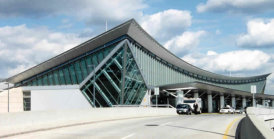
Buffalo Niagara International Airport

The Niagara Frontier Transportation Authority (NFTA) operates Buffalo Niagara International Airport and Niagara Falls International Airport. Buffalo is primarily served by the Buffalo Niagara International Airport, located in the nearby suburb of Cheektowaga. The airport, reconstructed in 1997, serves over 5 million passengers per year. Buffalo Niagara International Airport ranks among the five cheapest airports from which to fly in the country, according to U.S. Bureau of Transportation Statistics for 2013. The average round trip flight cost was $295.58.

In the 2010s there was a surge in Canadians flying out of Buffalo, mainly due to much cheaper tax and airline surcharges as compared with Canadian airports and the ability to fly on some US based, discount carriers not available in Canada (for example, JetBlue Airways and Southwest Airlines). In 2006, plans were in the works by U.S. Senator Charles Schumer to make the under-used Niagara Falls International Airport into an international cargo hub for New York and Toronto, and for Canada as a whole.

== Public transit ==
The Buffalo Metro Rail, also operated by the NFTA, is a 6.4 miles (10.3 km) long, single-line light rail system that extends from Erie Canal Harbor in downtown Buffalo to the University Heights district (specifically, the South Campus of University at Buffalo) in the northeastern part of the city. The downtown section of the line runs above ground and is free of charge to passengers. North of Theater Station, at the northern end of downtown, the line moves underground, remaining underground until it reaches the northern terminus of the line at University Heights. Passengers pay a fare to ride this section of the rail.

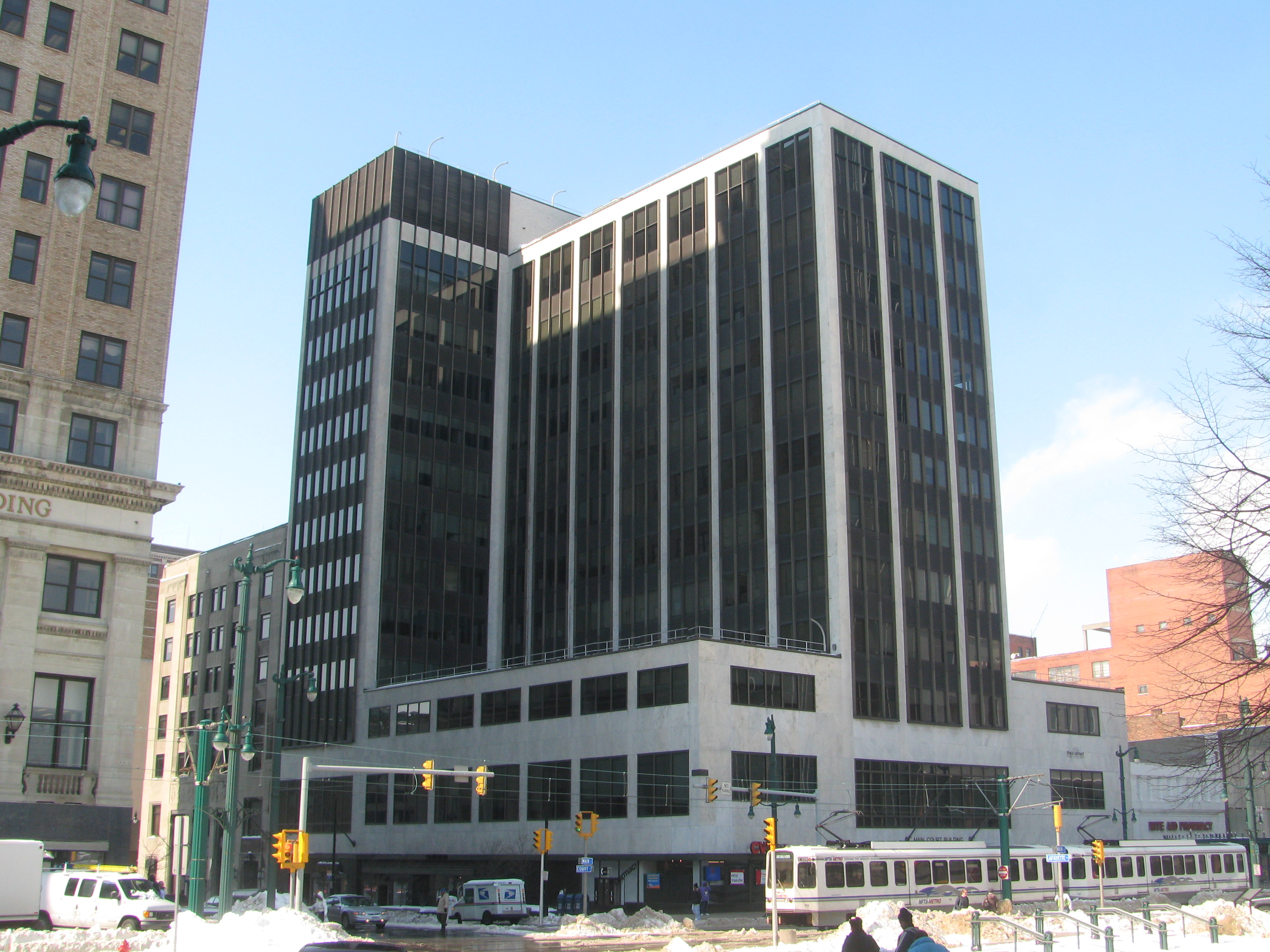
A Buffalo Metro Rail train passes through Lafayette Square.

A NFTA project underway, "Cars Sharing Main Street," will substantially revise the downtown portion of the Metro Rail. It will allow vehicular traffic and Metro Rail cars to share Main Street, in a manner similar to that of the trolleys of San Francisco. The design includes new stations and pedestrian-friendly improvements. The first phase of the project, restoring two-way traffic in the 700 block of Main Street between Edward and West Tupper Streets, was completed in 2009. The NFTA operates bus lines throughout the city, region and suburbs. The second, restoring two-way traffic in the 600 block of Main Street between West Tupper and West Chippewa Streets, was completed in January 2015.

== Railroads ==
The city has a single Amtrak intercity train station, Buffalo–Exchange Street station, rebuilt in 2020. The city's eastern suburbs are also served by the Buffalo–Depew station in Depew, New York, built in 1979. Historically the city was a major stop on through routes between Chicago and New York City through the lower Ontario peninsula. Additionally, the Pennsylvania Railroad ran trains between Buffalo and Washington, D.C., on the Buffalo Line through central Pennsylvania. New York Central trains went through the Buffalo Central Terminal, Lackawanna trains went through its terminal on Main Street until the mid-1950s and the Lehigh Valley Railroad's trains went through its terminal until 1952. From 1935 the Erie Railroad used the Lehigh Valley facility.

Freight service for Buffalo is served by CSX Transportation and Norfolk Southern (NS), as well as Canadian National (CN) and Canadian Pacific (CP) railroads from across the border. The area has four large rail yards: Frontier (CSX), Bison (NS), SK (NS / CP) and Buffalo Creek (NS / CSX). A large amount of hazardous cargo crosses through the Buffalo area, such as liquid propane and anhydrous ammonia.

== Waterways ==
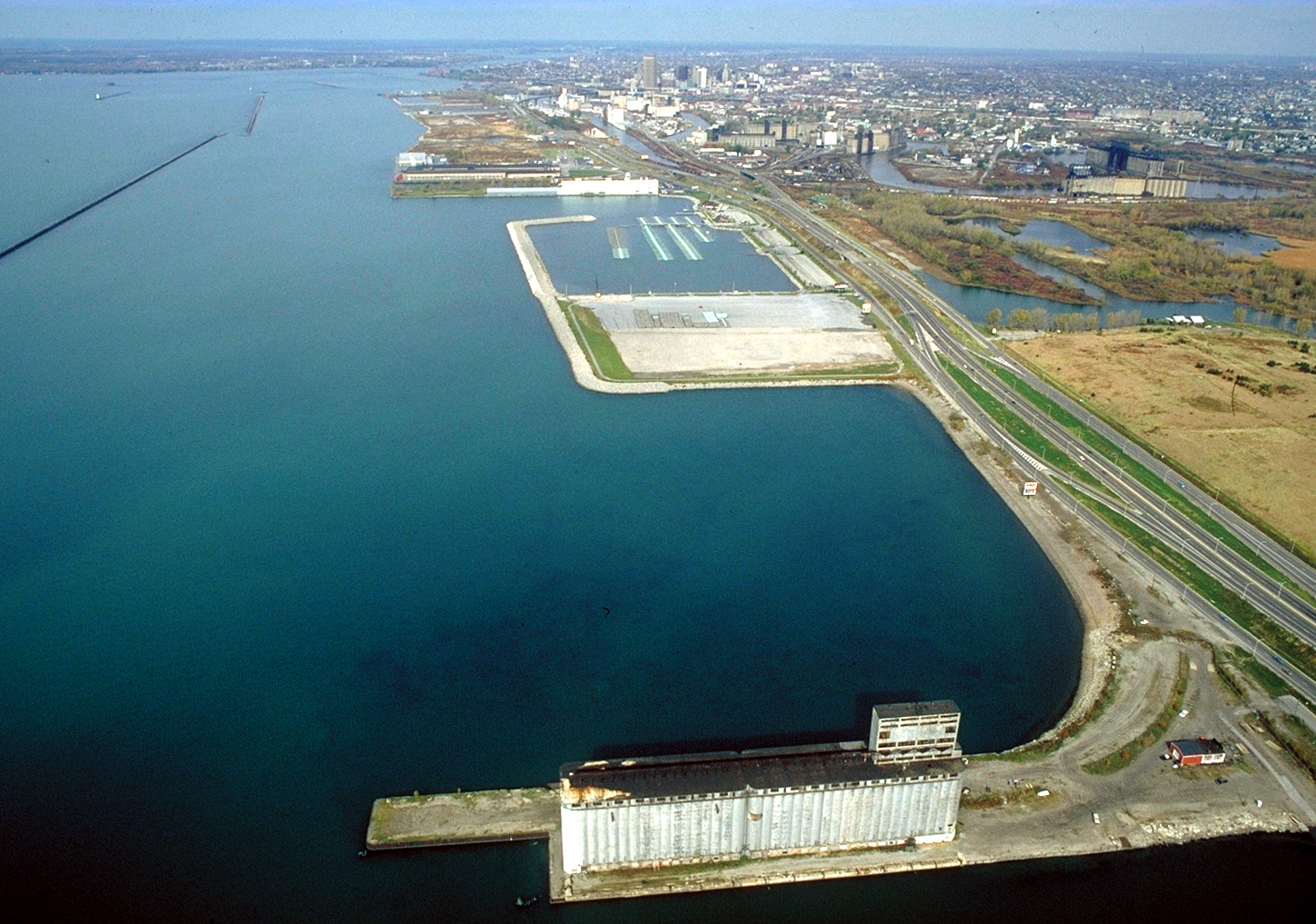
The Buffalo Outer Harbor in 1992. Northeast of the city is the Niagara River.

Buffalo is at the eastern end of one of the Great Lakes, Lake Erie, which boasts the greatest variety of freshwater sportfish in the country. The Lake serves as a playground for numerous personal yachts, sailboats, power boats and watercraft. The city has an extensive breakwall system protecting its inner and outer Lake Erie harbors, which are maintained at commercial navigation depths for Lake freighters. A Lake Erie tributary that flows through south Buffalo is the Buffalo River and Buffalo Creek.

Buffalo is historically linked to the fabled Erie Canal, which ended where the Black Rock Channel enters Lake Erie, at Buffalo Creek. When the Erie Canal was dedicated in 1825, its conceiver, New York State governor DeWitt Clinton, carried waters from Lake Erie at Buffalo's western terminus of the canal (now the Commercial Slip), and poured it into the Atlantic Ocean in New York City. He sailed to New York on the canal packet Seneca Chief. A return trip of the Seneca Chief carried Atlantic Ocean seawater. The seawater was poured into the Lake by Judge and future Buffalo Mayor Samuel Wilkeson. Once a major route for passengers and cargo, the Erie Canal played a primary role in opening the American West to settlers from the east. The canal is now used primarily for pleasure craft and some light local freight, and in Buffalo it bypasses the swift upper reach of the Niagara River. A tributary of the Niagara River is Scajaquada Creek, which flows through Buffalo, via the Olmsted-designed Delaware Park–Front Park System.

== Streets and highways ==
Eight New York State highways, one three-digit Interstate Highway and one U.S. Highway traverse the city of Buffalo. New York State Route 5, commonly referred to as Main Street within the city, enters through Lackawanna as a limited-access highway and intersects with Interstate 190, a north–south highway connecting Interstate 90 in the southeastern suburb of Cheektowaga with Niagara Falls. NY 354 (Clinton Street) and NY 130 (Broadway) are east to west highways connecting south and downtown Buffalo to the eastern suburbs of West Seneca and Depew. NY 265 (Delaware Avenue) and NY 266 (Niagara Street and Military Road) both originate in downtown Buffalo and terminate in the city of Tonawanda. One of three U.S. highways in Erie County, the other two being U.S. 20 and U.S. 219, U.S. 62 (Bailey Avenue) is a north to south trunk road that enters the city through Lackawanna and exits at the Amherst town border at a junction with NY 5. Within the city, the route passes by light industrial developments and high density areas of the city. Bailey Avenue has major intersections with Interstate 190 and the Kensington Expressway.

I-190 — Serves Much of southern Buffalo, and some of the first miles of the Erie Canal.

US 62 (Bailey Avenue) — Serves the eastern side of Buffalo and some of the neighborhoods.

NY 5 (Buffalo Skyway, Main Street) — Serves the Buffalo Harbor, the downtown district, the Buffalo General Hospital, and

NY 33 (Kensington Expressway) — Serves Buffalo's east side, and also serves access to the Buffalo Niagara International Airport.

NY 198 (Scajaquada Expressway) — Follows Scajaquada Creek and serves the Buffalo Zoo. Entirely within the Buffalo city limits.

Three major expressways serve the city of Buffalo. The Scajaquada Expressway (NY 198) is primarily a limited access highway connecting Interstate 190 near Unity Island to New York State Route 33. The Kensington Expressway (NY 33) begins at the edge of downtown and the city's East Side, continues through heavily populated areas of the city, intersects with Interstate 90 in Cheektowaga and ends shortly at the airport. The Peace Bridge is a major international crossing located near the Black Rock district of the city. The bridge connects Fort Erie, Ontario with the city.

=== Main Street ===
Main Street runs for 6.5 miles (5.2 miles are a part of NY 5) from Downtown to the University at Buffalo south campus.

Main street is the spine of the city dividing the city from east to west. Main street travels through many notable neighborhoods and areas of Buffalo. Areas of note include the Central Business District, the Theater District, Allentown, Central Park, and the University at Buffalo. It also for many decades has been the demarcation between racial and economic groups neighborhoods within the city, with the west side being generally wealthier and whiter and the east being generally poorer and with more people of color.

Just north of the city the street runs through the town of Amherst, a large Buffalo suburb. The road then travels east through the localities of Harris Hill, Batavia, and Le Roy, until reaching its terminus in Caledonia.

== Other transportation services ==
For Buffalo Public Schools they contract the school bus company First Student to transport children to and from school. Around Western New York, districts like Cheektowaga-Sloan Union Free School District and West Seneca Central School District also contract First Student. Districts like Cheektowaga Central Schools contract WNY Bus Co. Districts like Ken-Ton Schools have their own buses.

BPS, Cheektowaga Sloan, Cleveland Hill Union Free School District, West Seneca, and East Aurora Union Free School District contract with First Student.

== See also ==
- Plug-in electric vehicles in New York (state) § Buffalo
