= Xavier & Ophelia =

American indie rock and electropop music duo

Xavier and Ophelia
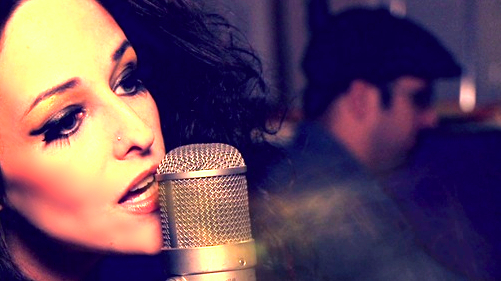
- Screenshot of I'm Alright, a Xavier & Ophelia music video

Background information
- Also known as: X&O
- Origin: Nashville, Tennessee, U.S.
- Genres: Synthpop, electronica, pop, alternative rock, indie rock
- Years active: Since 2009
- Labels: Independent, Real Life Music
- Members: Dave Tough; DeAnna Moore
- Website: xandomusic.com

Xavier and Ophelia is an American indie rock and electropop music duo based in Nashville. Formed in 2009, members include DeAnna Moore (vocals) and Dave Tough (keyboards, guitar, bass). They have released two albums including their debut Xavier & Ophelia, which had songs win industry awards. "Falling Down," a track from their 2012 sophomore album I Hate Birds, won Grand Prize at the 2013 John Lennon Songwriting Contest. Their songs have been placed in movies, television and commercials, and in 2013 their song "Heartbeat" was featured on Twisted, an ABC Family show.

According to Raw Ramp, "their sounds combine easy-listening melodies with electronic pop elements...[and] the angelic voice of DeAnna Moore is always centre-stage." Much of their music utilizes both live instruments and electronic production. The duo often performs live with a backing band, with regular venues including The Bluebird Cafe in Nashville.

== History ==
=== 2009-10: Founding ===
Before co-founding Xavier & Ophelia with DeAnna Moore, American producer and musician Dave Tough wrote music for television, film, and other artists for over a decade. Having studied under music engineers including Bruce Swedien and Neil Citron (also a guitarist from Toronto) Tough has also been a voting member of The Recording Academy.

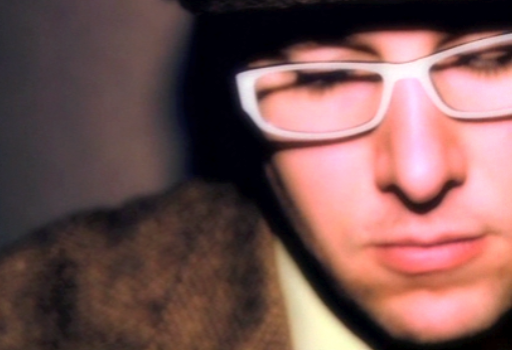
Multi-instrumentalist and band co-founder Dave Tough

Tough and Moore first met in 2009 over MySpace, when Tough was searching for vocalists for a demo. At the time Tough was still working as a producer, songwriter, and multi-instrumentalist. Earlier in 2009, he his first Grand Prize at the John Lennon Songwriting Contest in the country category. After meeting in person, they discovered a shared fascination with older jazz standards and artists including Fiona Apple, Edie Brickell, and the English duo, Goldfrapp. Music and Musicians Magazine said, "It was a lucky break when Dave Tough found DeAnna Moore on MySpace... in Moore he found a musical chameleon keen on jazz, New Wave and Kings of Leon." They soon formed the musical duo Xavier & Ophelia, with the band name originating from a pair of toy dolls. Also going by the moniker X&O, Moore contributes vocals while Tough handles production and instrumentals. Both members contribute to the songwriting process, and they began writing songs that variously integrated the genres of synthpop, electronica, pop, alternative rock, and indie rock. Early on the duo was based in Cane Ridge (an area in Antioch, Tennessee and in another part of Antioch.

=== 2011: X&O ===
They released their first album, Xavier & Ophelia, on April 1, 2011, on Real Life Music and Blue Pie Distribution. For a time the album's track "Six Billion Lonely People" was in rotation on the BBS Radio 24-hour music station, and in 2011 the duo was an SGX Radio featured artist. At the 2011 International Songwriting Competition the band was a semi-finalist with "Six Billion Lonely People," and the song was a finalist in the 2012 Songdoor Songwriting Competition as well. The song had been written with the assistance of John Foster, also known for playing with the Beach Boys in the early 2000s. "Last Recorded Summer," a pop song on the album written by Moore, Tough, and Neil Barber was nominated in the Indie International Songwriting Contest, and was also a finalist in the UK Songwriting Competition.

Critical reception

"Romance is definitely her style, and Moore's delicate soprano is feminine-alluring to the hilt. She's light as air a la Olivia Newton-John on 'I'm Alright,' and a little less breathy, showing her strength on the catchy dance pop 'Chateau Marmont,' bringing to mind Danish pop band The Asteroids Galaxy Tour's Mette Lindberg. 'Last Recorded Summer' has a retro-'60s commercial melody that suits her misty voice, and piano ballad 'Heartbeat' has all that edgy synth softened by a warm, honest performance."
— Music News Nashville (2011)

Critics gave the album a largely positive reception. According to Anna Maria Stjärnell of Luna Kafé e-zine, "Their debut is mellow and mostly very touching pop." Music News Nashville called the album an "unlikely blend of electronica, classic pop melodies and delicate vocal deliveries." It also praised the production saying "techno beats, computerized sounds, live instruments and lovely, layered vocals mixed together put a unique stamp on their clean productions."

Seven of the nine songs on the album are original, excluding covers of Kings of Leon's song "Use Somebody" and Jackson C. Frank's folk song "Milk & Honey." About the latter, Music News Nashville said, "Moore and Tough give a haunting, cinematic feel to their version."

Music Think Tank said the song "Six Billion Lonely People" is "electronic pop with acoustic elements and classic melodies reminiscent of Imogen Heap and Goldfrapp, featuring the breathy and angelic voice of DeAnna Moore." According to Luna Kafé e-zine, the song "uses Moore's vocals well, recalling Edie Brickell at her best." About other tracks the magazine said, "'Chateau Marmont' is a catchy number that recalls Saint Etienne in its summery haze. 'Passing Train' is equally lovely, a folksy melody setting the scene for a lullaby in blue." Also, "Use Somebody" is "presented here as a neon-bright dance track."

=== 2012: I Hate Birds ===
After touring in support of their first album the duo continued to write and produce new music. As of July 2012 Tough was finishing the tracking and overdubs on eight songs for their upcoming EP. The album was mixed by Reid Shippen, Keller Jahner, Drew Adams (Dave Pensado), Ryan States, and Brent Paschke. John Foster and Cameron Morgan contributed to the songwriting of certain tracks and the duo have also worked with guitarist Reeves Gabrels.

Their sophomore album, I Hate Birds, was self-released on December 18, 2012. Several songs from the album won or were nominated for awards. "Falling Down," co-written by Moore, Tough, and John Foster, won the Grand Prize at the John Lennon Songwriting Contest in the electronic category. Two more songs placed in the Indie International Songwriting Contest in spring 2013; "I Hate Birds," co-written with Sarah Majors, won second in the rock category, while "Made of Stars," co-written with A. Krause, came in second in the pop category. About the track "I Need Money" from I Hate Birds, Raw Ramp said, "Along with chippa acoustic strums and plucks, and a chirping rhythm that rattles along briskly, Deanna's voice–rich in cocoa butter oil–oozes from the cracks to melt into the fabric of the song." The review said, "The tune seems cheerful and full of hope... ironically it's all about a relationship going sour and the clinging, carping attitude that occurs before an inevitable closure."

=== 2013-14 and since ===
External videos
- "Stop the Traffic" Music Video (Nov '12)
- "I Need Money" Music Video (May '13)

The duo's music has been placed in movies, television and commercials. "Passing Train" was featured in multiple episodes of Alaska Gold Diggers, and in late 2013 their song "Heartbeat" was featured on Twisted. a show on ABC Family. They have also released several official music videos. A video for their song "Stop The Traffic" came out in the spring of 2014, and according to a review, "The clip features...stunning imagery in a busy metropolitan nighttime setting." The music video for "Six Billion Lonely People," performed by the band, came out in July 2014.

As of May 2014 the band was based in Nashville. Tough was a music industry educator at Belmont University and continued to produce/write other projects. For example, in 2012-2013 he wrote and produced nine songs for the television show Hart of Dixie on The CW. Xavier & Ophelia periodically performed live as a duo or with a backing band, with Tough switching between instruments such as guitar and keyboards. They regularly performed at The Bluebird Cafe in Nashville.

Their Web site has been offline since April 2020.

== Style ==
External videos
- Xavier & Ophelia - Acoustic Performance on Music City Streaming (January 2013)

Xavier & Ophelia is often categorized as an indie rock and electropop duo, and much of their music mixes live instruments such as acoustic guitar and drums with electronic production. According to Raw Ramp, "their sounds combine easy-listening melodies with electronic pop elements...[and] the angelic voice of DeAnna Moore is always centre-stage." The duo has cited Goldfrapp among their musical influences.

== Members ==
- Dave Tough – guitars, bass guitar, percussion, various instruments
- DeAnna Moore – lead vocals

== Discography ==
=== Albums ===
Albums by Xavier and Ophelia
Year	Album title	Release details
2011	Xavier & Ophelia	Released: Apr 1, 2011; Label: Real Life Music, Blue Pie; Format: CD, digital
2012	I Hate Birds	Released: Dec 18, 2012; Label: Self-released; Format: CD, digital

=== Singles ===
Incomplete list of songs by Xavier and Ophelia
Year	Title	Album	Certifications
2011	"Six Billion Lonely People"	X&O	Music video, finalist: Int. Songwriting Competition
2011	"Last Recorded Summer"	X&O	Finalist: UK Songwriting Competition
2011	"I'm Alright"	X&O	Music video
2011	"Passing Train"	X&O	Music video
2012	"Made of Stars"	I Hate Birds	2nd: Indie Int. Songwriting Contest
2012	"I Hate Birds"	I Hate Birds	2nd: Indie Int. Songwriting Contest
2012	"Falling Down"	I Hate Birds	Won: John Lennon Songwriting Contest
2012	"Stop the Traffic"	I Hate Birds	Music video

== Awards and nominations ==
Year	Award	Nominated work	Category	Result
2011	UK Songwriting Competition	"Last Recorded; Summer"	Best Song	Finalist
2011	Indie International Songwriting Contest	"Last Recorded; Summer"	Best Song	Finalist
2011	International Songwriting Competition	"Six Billion; Lonely People"	Best Song	Semi-finalist
2012	Songdoor Songwriting Competition	"Six Billion; Lonely People"	Best Song	Finalist
2013	The John Lennon Songwriting Contest	"Falling Down"	Best Electronica Song	Won
2013	Indie International Songwriting Contest	"I Hate Birds"	BestRock Song	2nd
2013	Indie International Songwriting Contest	"Made of Stars"	Best Pop Song	2nd
