= 1954 Cleveland Hill School District fire =

Fire at a wooden school building

- Date: March 31, 1954
- Location: Cleveland Hill Union Free School District's Elementary School Facility Annex in Cheektowaga, New York
- Cause: Potentially defective furnace or spontaneous combustion
- Deaths: 15
- Injuries: 23

The 1954 Cleveland Hill school fire was a fire and explosion that occurred on March 31, 1954 at the Cleveland Hill Union Free School District's elementary school facility annex in Cheektowaga, New York. The eight classroom wooden annex was added onto the existing brick school building to accommodate the influx of new students resulting from the "Baby Boom" following World War II.

== Incident ==
There was a sixth grade music class being held in the annex at the time of the explosion and fire which claimed the lives of 15 sixth-grade students along with injuring 19 students, three teachers and the school's principal. A student survivor later recounted he remembered a loud noise, followed seconds later by a doorway full of raging flames and pure panic.

Many students perished because they were unable to open the windows that were either locked or stuck. When the glass was broken to provide an avenue of escape they were cut trying to fit through the small size of the window panes. The cause of the fire was never determined but it may have been caused by a defective furnace that had been leaking fumes or possibly spontaneous combustion inside a storage closet.

== Victims ==
Of the 15 deceased victims, ten never made it out of the fire while the other five died due to their injuries.

Among those who survived but suffered severe burns was future folk musician Jackson C. Frank. The treatment of the burn victims from this fire was cited in later medical journals. Yet while many victims received high quality medical care, many highlighted how unprepared medical professionals, teachers, parents and friends were to deal with the tragedy and the magnitude of it and were often uncomfortable trying to discuss it.

== Aftermath ==
The annex facility was made entirely of wood and following the disaster there was a movement to introduce building codes that prohibited wooden buildings from housing schools. Other changes that came about because of the fire were fire drills, rules regarding window type and size, school construction methods and school communications with fire departments.

During the Erie county legislative chamber meeting on March 21, 2024, a new law was unveiled recognizing March 31st as a county-wide day of remembrance. This originally started as a bill created by the Cleveland Hill Union Free School District Middle School Youth and Government Club, with student Jax Keidel performing a speech. This clubs members attended the meeting, and at a point, were visible with the chair of the legislature.

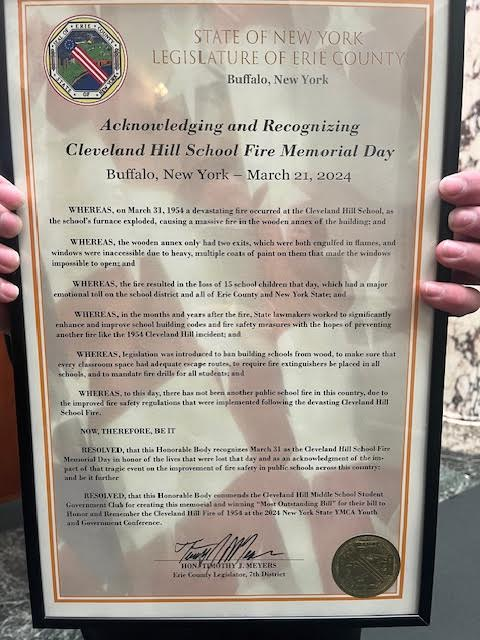
March 31st Cleveland Hill School District Fire recognition statue.
