= Dave Tough (music producer) =

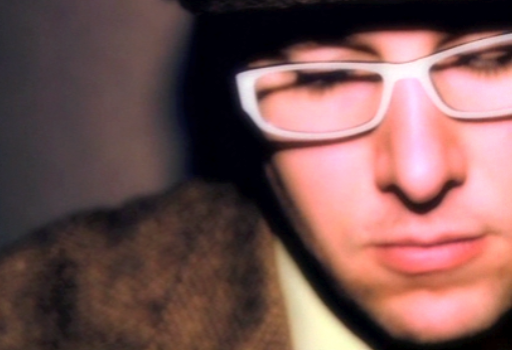
- Publicity photo of Tough for Xavier & Ophelia

Background information
- Born: David Thomas Tough; June 30, 1976 (age 50); Springfield, Missouri, U.S.
- Genres: Pop, rock, country, electronica, jazz
- Occupations: Songwriter, music educator, multi-instrumentalist, vocalist
- Instruments: Drums, vocals, bass guitar, piano, guitar, saxophone, mixing
- Years active: 1999–present
- Website: davetough.com

Dave Tough (born Springfield, Missouri) is an American multi-instrumentalist, producer, engineer, songwriter and music industry educator. He is also a member of the band Xavier & Ophelia who released their debut album X&O in 2011. Tough released two solo albums, one in 1999 and one in 2005, and he won the grand prize in the John Lennon Songwriting Contest twice, in 2009 in the country category, and in 2013 in the electronica category. He has also written and produced songs for shows including Hart of Dixie, Nashville, Hemlock Grove, and the Seth Rogen film Observe and Report. Tough has won two GMA Covenant Awards (the Canadian equivalent of the Dove Awards) for his work producing, engineering, and writing songs with instrumental guitarist Sean Spicer.

== Early life, education ==
Dave Tough was born in Springfield and grew up there. He attended the same high school as Brad Pitt, Kickapoo High. Tough developed an early interest in music and in his youth started playing saxophone, later transitioning to drums, bass, piano, and guitar. While attending the University of North Texas in Denton northwest of Dallas in the mid-1990s, he performed with several bands in the Dallas area including serving as drummer for the R&B ensemble of Al "TNT" Bragg, and he worked as a disc jockey for jazz from May to August 1997 at KNTU 88.1 FM, the college station. He graduated from UNT in August 1998 with a BA degree in music and a focus on jazz and the jazz drum set.

== Music career ==
=== 1998–99: Music business career, I'm Right Here ===
Tough worked at Capitol Records/EMI from July 1998 to June 1999. After five years in Texas, he moved to Los Angeles to work for a variety of music and entertainment companies. He worked at BMG Music Publishing and in technology consulting for Warner Music Group. He attended Pepperdine University in Malibu, California from 1999 to 2001 on a scholarship, graduating with a Master of Business Administration in April 2001. He also has an ADR certificate from Pepperdine School of Law.

After a recommendation from Warner-Elektra-Atlantic (WEA) CEO Dave Mount, he worked as a copyright coordinator at Warner/Chappell Music Publishing in Los Angeles. While in Los Angeles he also studied under music engineers including Bruce Swedien, Allen Sides (who began Ocean Way Recording), and Neil Citron (additionally a guitarist from Toronto). Tough has been a voting member of The Recording Academy.

=== 2002–14:Teaching Career ===
Tough has served as a music business, recording, producing and songwriting professor since 2002. He was on the list of "15 Outstanding Professors Every Audio Enthusiast Should Know at #11. He first began teaching music technology at a number of institutions in California, including UCLA. He was an assistant professor in music technology and business at California State Polytechnic University, Pomona west of Fontana from August 2002 to August 2004.

Tough accepted a job offer in January 2005 to teach at Belmont University in Nashville. From August 2005 to August 2006 he was teaching music technology at the University of North Alabama in Florence west of Huntsville, before beginning to work exclusively at Belmont's Mike Curb College full-time. He was on the executive committee of the Audio Engineering Society in Nashville from 2005 to 2007.

=== 2005–11: Gravity Always Wins, compilations ===
His second solo album, Gravity Always Wins, was self-released in 2005. The album was recorded in 2004 at Steve Vai's Mothership Studios, with a focus on the sounds of 1980s new wave and art rock. Los Angeles producer and keyboardist Steven Leavitt co-produced the album along with Tough, and arranged the strings. Other contributing musicians included guitarist Neil Citron (Steve Vai, Johnny Hiland), drummer Mitch Marine (has played with Smash Mouth, Jack Ingram, and Dwight Yoakam) as well as recording engineer and musician Jim Demain (Josh Rouse, Keith Urban). Indie-Music.com called the album "down-to-earth," and in a positive review said, "Tough's music doesn't sound too much like the stuff you hear all the time on the radio these days. Instead, tracks such as 'Photograph' and 'Never Gonna Change' borrow chunks of inspiration from 80s New Wave guitar rock. It's not all rock & roll from beginning to end, however, as this CD's title track utilizes a classical arrangement."

After Gravity Always Wins, Tough released many digital compilations on iTunes, including a 2006–2007 Songs CD in March 2008. He won the country category in the 2009 John Lennon Songwriting Contest for a song he co-wrote titled "Beatles Without John". He released his album Dave Tough – 2008–2010 in 2011. In the 2011 International Songwriting Competition, he was a finalist with the song "Nothing Sweet About Alabama," and a semi-finalist with the song "Six Billion Lonely People." He co-wrote both songs.

=== 2008–14: Dave Tough Productions ===
Tough is owner and operator of Dave Tough Productions, a company which provides a recording studio and music production services to national and international clients.

Tough has produced, engineered and written songs for hundreds of both signed and independent artists in a variety of genres at his studio and in other places. Much of his production and mastering work is done over the internet. He was featured in Music Connection magazine in the summer of 2009 as producer and engineer for the Frog Eye Jug Band. Some of the clients he has produced under Dave Tough Productions include The Lost Trailers, Cindy Alter from the band Clout, and Danny Gottlieb, a drummer. Tough has had several recordings of his songs made by independent artists.

=== 2009–14: Xavier & Ophelia ===
In 2009 Tough founded the pop, rock, and electronica group Xavier & Ophelia with vocalist and songwriter DeAnna Moore. The duo first met in 2009 on Myspace, when Tough was searching for vocalists for a demo. After meeting in person they discovered a shared fascination with older jazz standards and artists including Fiona Apple, Edie Brickell, and the English duo, Goldfrapp. They soon formed Xavier & Ophelia, also going by the moniker X&O. Moore contributes vocals while Tough handles production and instrumentals. Both members contribute to the songwriting process, and they began writing songs which variously integrated the genres of synth-pop, electronica, pop, alternative rock, and indie rock. Early on the band was based in Cane Ridge (an area in Antioch, Tennessee) and other parts of Antioch.

The duo released their first album, Xavier & Ophelia, on April 1, 2011. The album met with a largely positive reception among critics. Music News Nashville praised Tough's production, saying "techno beats, computerized sounds, live instruments and lovely, layered vocals mixed together put a unique stamp on their clean productions." For a time the album's track "Six Billion Lonely People" was in rotation on the BBS Radio 24-hour music station. At the 2011 International Songwriting Competition, the band was a semi-finalist with "Six Billion Lonely People, and the song was a finalist in the 2012 Songdoor Songwriting Competition as well. "Last Recorded Summer," a pop song on the album, was nominated in the Indie International Songwriting Contest and was also a finalist in the UK Songwriting Competition.

Their second album, I Hate Birds, was self-released on December 18, 2012, and several tracks went on to win or be nominated for awards. "Falling Down" won the Grand Prize at the John Lennon Songwriting Contest in the electronic category, and two more songs placed in the Indie International Songwriting Contest in spring 2013: "I Hate Birds" in the rock category and "Made of Stars" in the pop category.

The band's music has been placed in movies, television, and commercials. "Passing Train" was featured in multiple episodes of Alaska Gold Diggers, and in late 2013 their song "Heartbeat" was featured on the television show Twisted. Xavier & Ophelia periodically performs live as a duo or with a backing band, with Tough switching between instruments such as guitar and keyboards. They regularly perform at The Bluebird Cafe in Nashville.

=== 2010–18: Film placements ===
Tough has had a number of his songs placed in television shows on major networks. In August 2010 his song "Vegas" was featured in The CW series Plain Jane, and later that year his song "Constantly Falling" was featured in Seth Rogen's feature film Observe and Report. In January 2012, his songs " Let's Get Crazy," "Vegas," and "Pretty Mama" placed in episodes 102–107 of The CW reality television series Remodel. The show ended up using ten of his songs that year. Later in 2012, the CBS Sports Network featured his song "Brownsville," co-written with Bill Dilugi, in a bull riding scene, and in late 2012 he produced, engineered, wrote, and co-wrote nine songs for the television series Hart of Dixie. The episodes include "Pilot," "Padres and Pariahs," "In Havoc and Heat," "The Pirate & The Practice," "Aliens and Alias," and "The Big Day."

In 2012–2013 he produced a song for the ABC series This Moment, a song he produced and co-wrote with Justin Busch, was then used as the theme song for a cycling DVD by Endurance Films in February 2013. In late 2013 his song "Hillbilly Hollywood" was used on the show Nashville, his song "Pretty Mama" appeared in the ABC movie Christmas Bounty, and his songs "Nothing Sweet About Alabama" and "Passing Train" appeared in Alaska Gold Diggers. Also, a song he co-wrote and produced titled "Pretty Mama (So Many Girls)" was used in episode 102 of the Netflix show Hemlock Grove. In the summer of 2014, he produced and engineered an original track titled "Close" for the documentary Cuddle, directed by Jason O'Brien.

In 2016, two of Tough's songs "Because of You" and "Sweet Remedy" received prominent features in the movie Return of the Prodigal Son. Also, his song "Gonna Find My Way to You" was placed in the introduction of the Hallmark Channel movie Summer Love. In 2017 Tough's song "I Love Em All" was placed in the film Thumper which debuted at the Tribeca Film Festival in Manhattan, New York.

=== Since 2012 ===
Tough was on the faculty at the GRAMMY Camp hosted in Nashville by The Recording Academy in June 2012 and June 2014. He is a member of The College Music Society, National Academy of Recording Arts & Sciences, American Society of Composers, Authors and Publishers, and has served on the Music and Entertainment Industry Educators Association Board. A song he co-wrote titled "Tell Ya That I Love Ya" was chosen as a semi-finalist in the International Songwriting Competition of 2013.

In 2017 Tough won his second Dove/GMA award for producing/engineering the Instrumental Song of the Year "Rise Again." He also started his own YouTube show entitled The Producer's Room with Dave Tough.

As of May 2018, Dave Tough is based in Nashville where he continues to work on new music in his Nashville studio. Tough simultaneously is a music industry educator at Belmont University, and continues to produce/write other projects as well. He continues to publish scholarly material on the music industry. Tough is known to use Pro Tools, Cubase, Nuendo, Digital Performer, Sibelius, and the scorewriting program Finale.

== Personal life ==
In 2007 he successfully finished a round of cancer treatment.

== Publishing history ==
- Tough, D. (Fall 1997). "Show & Tell" in Process Magazine
- Tough, D. (2005) "Beautiful Dreamer: Brian Wilson and the Story of SMILE" in Journal of the Music & Entertainment Educators Association (Vol. 5, No. 1)
- Tough, D. (2010). "Shaping Audio Engineering Curriculum: An Expert Panel's View of the Future." AES Convention
- Tough, D. (2010). "Shaping Future Audio Engineering Curricula: An Expert Panel's View;" Music and Entertainment Industry Educators Association (MEIEA) Journal
- Tough, D. (2010). Play it Again: Cover Songs in Popular Music (April 1, 2010, Ashgate, ISBN 978-0754668091) – authored chapter
- Tough, D. (2012). "A Focus on Robert Gagne's Instruction Theories: Application to Teaching Audio Engineering." Music and Entertainment Industry Educators Association (MEIEA) Journal
- Tough, D. (2013). "Teaching Modern Production and Songwriting Techniques: What Makes a Hit Song?" Music and Entertainment Industry Educators Association (MEIEA) Journal

== Discography ==
=== Solo Material ===
Albums

Solo Albums by Dave Tough
Year	Album title	Release details
1999	I'm Right Here	Released: January 1, 1999; Label: Self-released; Format: digital
2005	Gravity Always Wins	Released: February 3, 2005; Label: Real Life Music; Format: digital
2008	2006–2007 Songs	Released: March 21, 2008; Real Life Music; Format:CD, digital
2011	Dave Tough-2008-2010	Released: September 20, 2011; Label:Self-released; Format: digital
2011	The Best of Dave Tough Volume 1	Released: November 1, 2011; Label: Blue Pie; Format: digital
2011	The Best of Dave Tough Volume 2	Released: November 1, 2011; Label: Blue Pie; Format: digital

Singles

Selected songs by Dave Tough
Year	Title	Album	Certifications
2008	"Beatles Without John"	2006–2007 Songs	Won: John Lennon Songwriting Contest
2010	"Vegas"	n/a	Used in CW series Plain Jane
2010	"Constantly Falling"	n/a	Used in Observe and Report
2010	"Nothing Sweet About Alabama"	n/a	Finalist: 2011 International Songwriting Competition
2012	"Tell Ya That I Love Ya (ft. Tre Houston and Solo Jones)"	n/a	Semi-finalist: 2013 Int. Songwriting Competition
2012	"Brownsville"	n/a	Used by CBS Sports Network
2012	"This Moment"	n/a	Used by Endurance Films
2012	"Pretty Mama (So Many Girls)"	n/a	Used in ep. 102 of Hemlock Grove

=== With X and O ===
Albums

Albums by Xavier and Ophelia
Year	Album title	Release details
2011	Xavier & Ophelia	Released: April 1, 2011; Label: Real Life Music, Blue Pie; Format: CD, digital
2012	I Hate Birds	Released: December 18, 2012; Label: Self-released; Format: CD, digital

Singles

Selected songs by Xavier and Ophelia
Year	Title	Album	Certifications
2011	"Six Billion Lonely People"	Xavier and Ophelia	Finalist: Int/ Songwriting Competition
2011	"Last Recorded Summer"	Xavier and Ophelia	Finalist: UK Songwriting Competition
2012	"Made of Stars"	"I Hate Birds"	2nd: Indie Int. Songwriting Contest
2012	"I Hate Birds"	"I Hate Birds"	2nd Indie Int. Songwriting Contest
2012	Falling Down	"I Hate Birds"	Won: John Lennon Songwriting Contest

=== Production credits ===
Selected production credits for Dave Tough
Year	Release title	Artists	Notes, Role
2000	I Fall in Love	Juan Miranda	Producer
2000	The Road Less Traveled	Yasha	Producer, engineer, writer
2002	Whiskey EP	Come & Go	Producer
2002	Dark Heart	Cindy Alter	Producer
2002	Ghost	Matt Heinecke	Producer, engineer

== Awards and nominations ==
Year	Award	Nominated work	Category	Result
2009	John Lennon Songwriting Contest	"Beatles Without John"	Country Category	Grand Prize
2011	UK Songwriting Competition	"Last Recorded Summer" by X&0	Best song	Finalist
2011	Indie International Songwriting Contest	"Last Recorded Summer" by X&0	Best Song	Finalist
2011	International Songwriting Competition	"Nothing Sweet About Alabama"	Best Song	Finalist
2011	International Songwriting Competition	"Six Billion Lonely People" by X&O	Best Song	Semi-finalist
2012	Songdoor Songwriting Competition	"Six Billion Lonely People" by X&O	Best Song	Finalist
2013	The John Lennon Songwriting Contest	"Falling Down" by X&O	Best Electronica Song	Won
2013	Indie International Songwriting Contest	"I Hate Birds by X&O	Best Rock Song	2nd
2013	Indie International Songwriting Contest	"Made of Stars" by X&O	Best Pop Song	2nd
2013	International Songwriting Competition	"Tell Ya That I Love Ya"	Best Song	Semi-finalist
2013	Covenant Awards	"Comfort and Peace" by Sean Spice	Instrumental Song of the Year	Semi-finalist

== See also ==
- Xavier and Ophelia
