= Antwon Burton =

American football player (born 1983)

No. 93, 78, 98
- Position: Defensive tackle

Personal information
- Born: July 11, 1983 (age 43); Buffalo, New York, U.S.
- Listed height: 6 ft 2 in (1.88 m)
- Listed weight: 325 lb (147 kg)

Career information
- High school: Cleveland Hill (Cheektowaga, New York)
- College: Temple
- NFL draft: 2006: undrafted

Career history
- Denver Broncos (2006–2007); Cincinnati Bengals (2008)*; Kansas City Chiefs (2008); St. Louis Rams (2008); Carolina Panthers (2009); Florida Tuskers (2010); Sacramento Mountain Lions (2010); Virginia Destroyers (2011)
- * Offseason or practice squad member only

Awards and highlights
- UFL champion (2011)

Career NFL statistics
- Total tackles: 5
- Pass deflections: 1
- Stats at Pro Football Reference

Antwon Burton (born July 11, 1983) is an American former professional football player who was a defensive tackle in the National Football League (NFL). He was signed by the Denver Broncos as an undrafted free agent in 2006. He played college football for the Temple Owls.

Burton was also a member of the Cincinnati Bengals, Kansas City Chiefs, St. Louis Rams, Carolina Panthers, Florida Tuskers, Sacramento Mountain Lions and Virginia Destroyers.

== Early life ==
Burton was a First-team All-State and All-Western New York selection as a senior at Cleveland Hill High School in Cheektowaga, New York.

== College career ==
Burton played 22 games (16 starts) and totaled 96 tackles in two seasons at Temple University after transferring from Erie Community College in Orchard Park, N.Y. As a senior in 2005, Burton played 11 games (10 starts), posting 66 tackles (26 solo), five tackles-for-losses, four fumble recoveries, three forced fumbles and three pass breakups. Burton concluded his collegiate career by playing in the East-West Shrine Game. Before the start of his senior year, he was named one of the top five independent pro prospects by the College Football News. He played 11 games (6 starts) in his first year at Temple as a junior in 2003 before missing the 2004 season with a foot injury. He posted 6.5 sacks and was voted First-team All-Northeast Conference at Erie Community College in 2002.

== Professional career ==
=== Pre-draft ===
At his pro day workout at Temple University, Burton measured 6-1 3/4 and 308 pounds. He ran a 5.39 forty-yard dash and did 31 reps of 225 pounds. He also had a 31 1/2" vertical leap and a broad jump of 9'5"

=== Denver Broncos ===
Burton, who entered the NFL with the Broncos as a college free agent on May 3, 2006, was signed to Denver's practice squad after training camp. He was signed to the Broncos' active roster on November 12, 2006, and made his professional debut with an assisted tackle at Oakland on November 12, 2006. He was declared inactive for the rest of the season. In 2007, he played in six games and made eight tackles (five solo). He was waived on November 13, 2007, and signed November 14, 2007 to Broncos practice squad, where he finished the season.

=== Cincinnati Bengals ===
Burton signed with Bengals as a free agent on May 4, 2008. Burton was on the roster of the Kansas City Chiefs and St. Louis Rams in 2008 but did not play in a game.

=== Carolina Panthers ===
Burton signed with the Carolina Panthers on September 22, 2009, after they lost Ma'ake Kemoeatu and Louis Leonard for the season. He was waived on October 20, after the Panthers acquired Tank Tyler from Kansas City.
