= Mickey Harmon =

American artist (1984–2025)

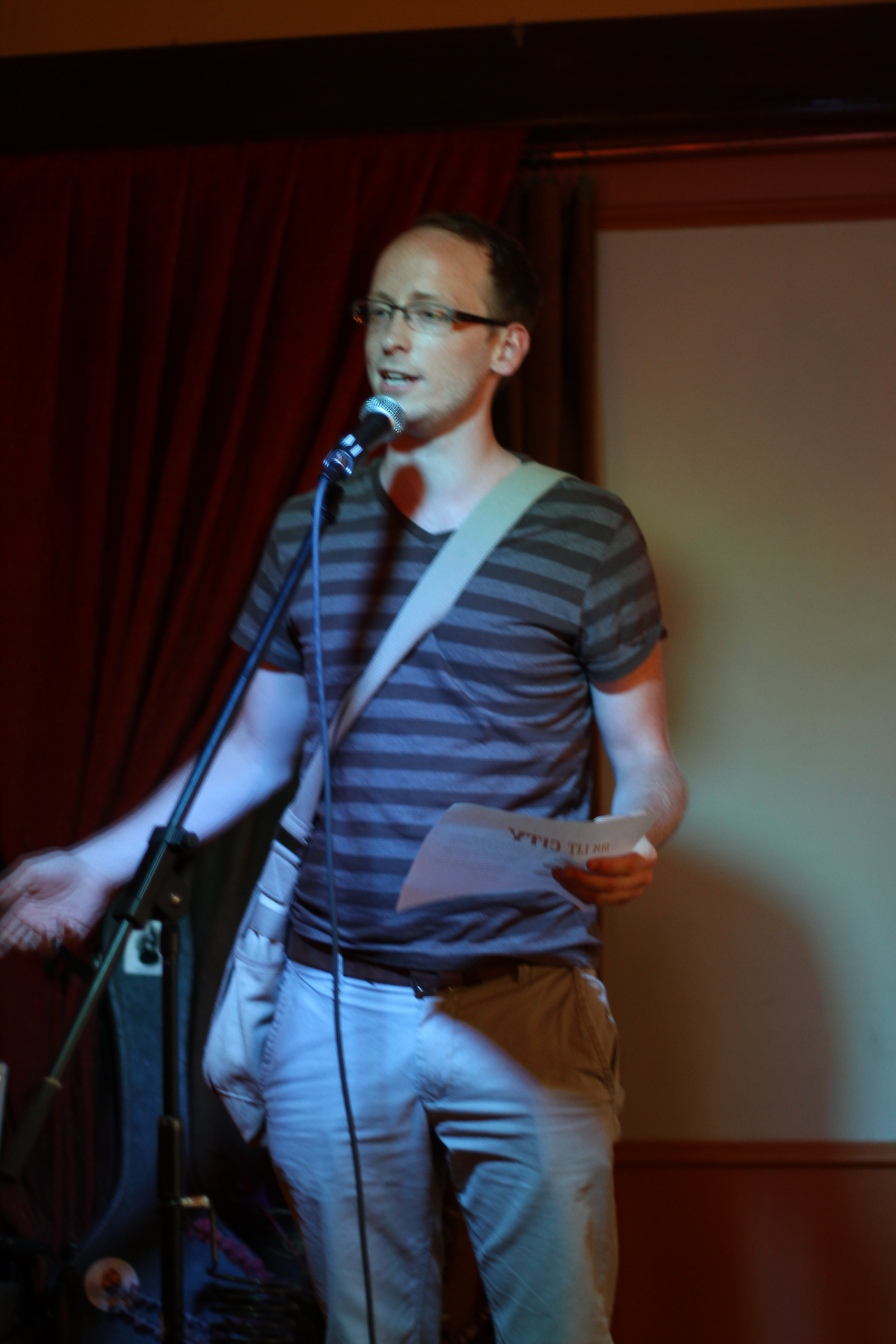
- Harmon in 2011
- Born: Michael Terrence Harmon; May 13, 1984; Cheektowaga, New York, U.S.
- Died: March 4, 2025 (aged 40); Buffalo, New York, U.S.
- Resting place: Forest Lawn Cemetery, Buffalo, New York
- Education: SUNY Erie; Buffalo State University
- Known for: Graphic design, illustration, muralist, painting
- Style: Contemporary art
- Partner: Jordan Celotto (2019–2025)
- Website: mickeyharmon.com

Michael Terrence Harmon (May 13, 1984 – March 4, 2025) was an American visual artist, graphic designer and queer activist.

He was a prominent fixture of the Allentown district of Buffalo, New York, living and working within the neighborhood. His commissioned murals and paintings were highly regarded, and he regularly organized community events to support the arts.

Harmon and his longtime partner were both killed in a March 2025 home invasion. Their deaths received widespread media coverage, and sparked an outpouring of public support for the LGBTQ community.

== Early life and education ==
Michael Terrence Harmon was born in Cheektowaga, New York, the son of Susan (née Knibbs) and Terrence Harmon, and had two brothers. He began drawing at the age of seven, and cited J. C. Leyendecker and Lester Beall as his primary influences.

His father was a boilermaker by trade, and died following complications from a 1999 industrial accident. Frustrated by his suburban upbringing, Harmon found solace in visiting his aunt during the weekends in the city of Buffalo, and aspired to live there one day.

While enrolled at Cleveland Hill High School, Harmon attended BOCES classes and received a certification in graphic design. He graduated from SUNY Erie with an associate's degree in liberal arts, and then attained his bachelor of fine arts in graphic design from Buffalo State University.

== Career ==
External videos
- You Are In Nearly Every Future (2014)
- Minecraft Buffalo (2015)
- Artist's Talk: Mickey Harmon (2016)
- Stonewall Nation (2020)
- City of No Illusions (2022)

Harmon, Alicia Paolucci and Tom Holt were the subjects of Noah Falck's 2014 short film, You Are In Nearly Every Future.

Hallwalls hosted the unveiling of his Buffalo Minecraft project in 2015, a virtual recreation of the city of Buffalo in Minecraft that took over two years to complete. The following year, he would appear at Hallwalls as part of their Artist's Talk series.

He worked for Rosen Publishing from 2011 to 2016, illustrating the company's children's books and educational material.

Harmon co-founded the Pine Apple Company gallery in 2016 with fellow artists James Moffitt and Sarah Liddell, which was later renamed to The Good Stuff. He was frequently commissioned to create paintings of private and public architecture, which he would sell prints of at the Allentown gallery.

After being fired from a real estate firm in 2018 when coworkers discovered his portfolio of erotica artwork and complained, Harmon went into business for himself as a full-time artist.

Harmon, James Moffitt and Sarah Liddell collaborated on their Niagara Street mural, which was commissioned by National Grid in 2019 and installed at 996 Busti Avenue.

He created and installed a mural titled City of No Illusions within the University at Buffalo Center for the Arts atrium in 2022.

Friends of Night People commissioned Harmon to create his Charity mural, which was installed at 394 Hudson Street in 2024.

== Activism ==
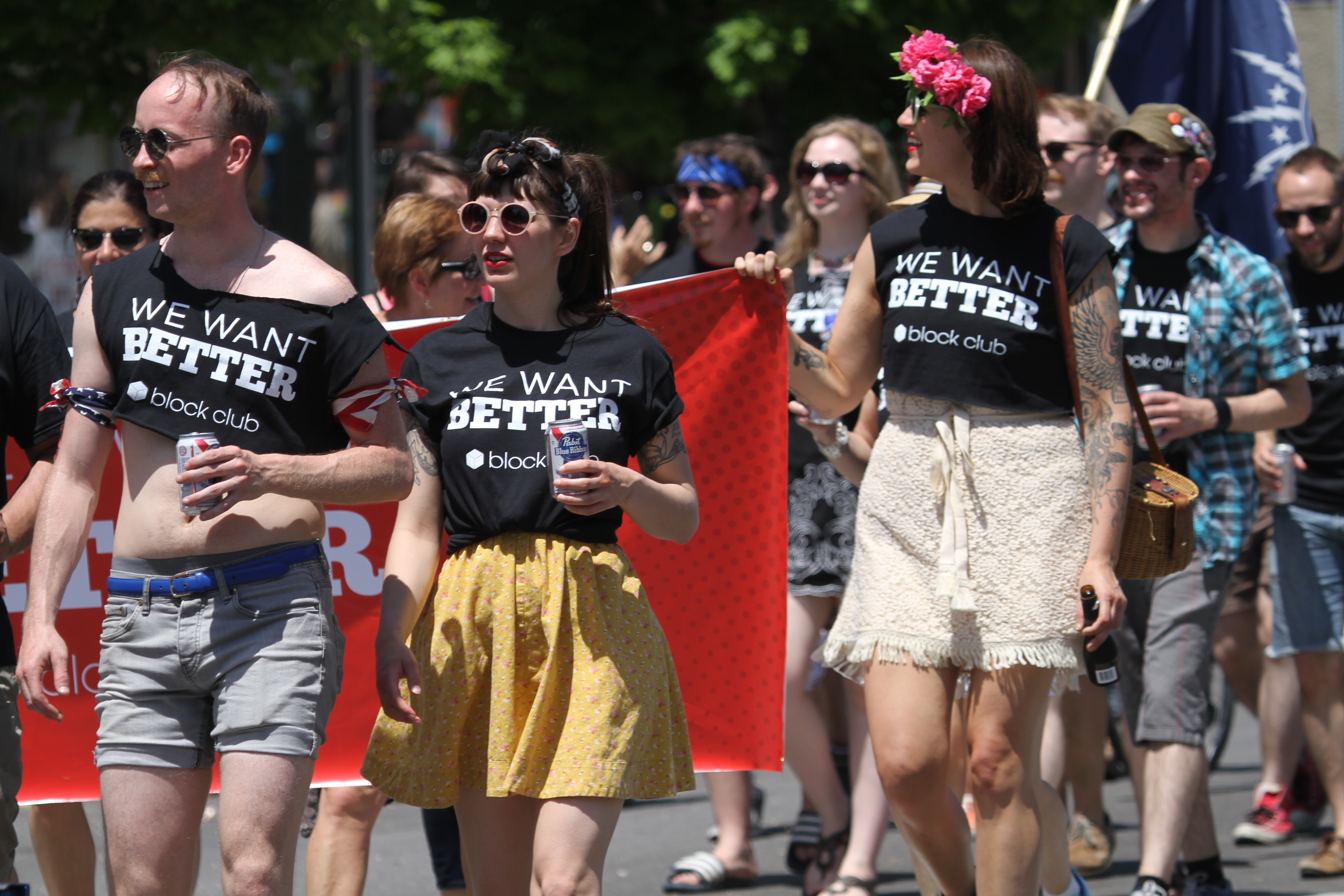
Harmon (left) marching in the Buffalo Pride Parade, 2014

Harmon identified as queer and was renowned for his efforts to unite and uplift Buffalo's LGBTQ community.

He co-founded Exist, A Queer Festival in 2018, which has since become an annual event and been renamed to Intersect: A Pride Arts Festival. While serving on the Allentown Association board, Harmon organized the monthly First Friday gallery walks to promote local artists and galleries.

A collaborative mural by Harmon and Ari Moore titled Stonewall Nation was installed at 44 Allen Street in 2020, honoring key historical figures of the LGBTQ movement. He served on the board of the Buffalo-Niagara LGBTQ History Project.

Harmon started a volunteer snow removal program with Allentown residents in 2024 to protest Buffalo's lack of municipal sidewalk plowing.

At the time of his death, Harmon was promoting the inaugural Queertopia festival he had founded, which was turned into an impromptu memorial to the artist and his partner.

== Personal life and death ==
Harmon's mother died of cancer in 2018.

He met partner and fellow artist Jordan Celotto online, and Celotto moved to Buffalo from Toronto in 2019 to live with Harmon. Celotto was born in the Six Nations of the Grand River, and identified as queer and twospirited. At the time of his death, Celotto was working at the Remedy House café while moonlighting locally as disc jockey DJ NuNu.

Harmon and Celotto had two cats, named Beef and Chicken.

Harmon and his longtime partner, Anthony "Jordan" Celotto, were both killed in a home invasion at their 5 St. Louis Place apartment on March 4, 2025. The alleged killer, Bryan Chiclana, was charged with first and second-degree murder. Chiclana entered the home through a basement window that landlord Eric Hauser had failed to secure.

Community members and politicians called on a house at 2 St. Louis Place across from the murder scene to be sold or demolished, as it was abandoned and known to attract squatters. 2 St. Louis Place owner Charles Dobucki was arrested soon after for housing court violations. Zenata Everhart, Buffalo Common Council representative of the neighboring Masten District, had just pulled funding for a proposed homeless shelter a month before the murders due to concerns over property values.

=== Tributes, funeral, and burial ===
A vigil was held for Harmon and Celotto in front of Harmon's Stonewall Nation mural on the evening of March 5, 2025.

The Allentown Association announced on March 6, 2025, that it would see through Harmon's plan to turn vacant land at 169 Allen Street into an art-focused community space.

Adam Zyglis of The Buffalo News published a tribute to Harmon and Celotto on March 7, 2025, in place of his normal political cartoon. The drawing, depicting Harmon holding an Allen Street signpost, has since been installed as a mural at the corner of Allen & Elmwood.

Tim Kennedy of New York's 26th congressional district honored Harmon and Celotto on March 11, 2025, with a speech on the floor of the United States House of Representatives.

Sean Ryan of the New York State Senate honored Harmon and Celotto on March 11, 2025, with a senate resolution, speaking of their achievements and legacy on the senate floor.

Hallwalls hosted a Celebration of Life for Harmon and Celotto on March 22, 2025. After successful crowdfunding campaigns to cover their funeral expenses, Harmon was buried at Forest Lawn Cemetery, with Celotto laid to rest in his native Canada.
