= Cleveland Hill, New York =

Hamlet in New York, United States

Coordinates: 42°56′41″N 78°47′03″W

Cleveland Hill is a hamlet in the town of Cheektowaga in Erie County, New York, United States. It is the location of the Cleveland Hill School District. Cleveland Hill is often called Cleve Hill. The center of Cleveland Hill is located at Harlem Road and Cleveland Drive. Cleveland Hill is unique in that the Onondaga Escarpment runs through it with the elevation at Harlem Road and Cleveland Drive being 215 meters (705 ft). The elevation decreases as one heads north or south on Harlem Road. Only if one heads east towards the Buffalo Niagara International Airport does the elevation stay the same or increase slightly.
