= Forest of Eden =

Forest Of Eden

Compilation album by Jackson C. Frank
- Released: 16 September 2013
- Recorded: 1950s – 60s
- Genre: Folk
- Label: Secret Records
- Producer: various

Jackson C. Frank chronology
Blues Run The Game (2003)	Forest Of Eden (2013)	Fixin' To Die (2014)

Professional ratings
Review scores
Source	Rating
Record Collector	3/5 stars

Forest Of Eden is a 2013 compilation album featuring unreleased and demo versions of songs by American folk singer Jackson C. Frank. It was released as a 10-inch vinyl that was packaged with a CD version of the same content. The title track is previously unreleased while "I Want To Be Alone" and "Here Come The Blues" were demo recordings for his 1965 self-titled album. Also featured are two Elvis Presley covers Frank recorded in the mid-1950s.

== Track listing ==
All songs written by Jackson C. Frank, except where noted

1. "Forest Of Eden" – 3:08
2. (Spoken Intro) "Heartbreak Hotel" (Mae Boren Axton, Thomas Durden) – 2:34
3. "Santa, Bring My Baby Back to Me / Precious Lord" (Aaron Schroeder, Claude Demetrius) – 2:43
4. "I Want To Be Alone" – 2:17
5. "Here Come The Blues" – 4:20
6. "You Never Wanted Me" – 4:25
