= WNY Bus Co =

School bus provider

WNY Bus Co. is a school bus transportation provider based in Western New York.

== History ==
WNY Bus Co, was originally known as Carrier Coach. Carrier Coach had many problems, such as job cuts, safety citations, and more. That led to Carrier Coach shutting down.

In 2023, WNY Bus Co. began planning a new headquarters on Buffalo's East Side, which would shift its main operations from the Hamburg Base on Lakeshore Road, and the Depew base on Sheldon Ave to its new location on Scajaquada St.

In 2026, WNY Bus Co holds its main operations at the new Buffalo Base on Scajaquada Road. They also still operate buses out of the Depew base The Sanborn and Hamburg Bases (Inducon Dr W, Lakeshore Rd) are becoming less used due to the shifting to the new base in the East Side.

== Operations ==
WNY BUS CO operates buses for many school districts around Western New York.

WNY Bus Co operates for

Cheektowaga-Maryvale Union Free School District

Cheektowaga Central School District

and Lackawanna City School District

=== Competition ===
WNY Bus Co competes with many companies in Buffalo area transportation.

In Cheektowaga and Buffalo, WNY Bus Co competes with First Student for school bus transportation. First Student operates buses for Buffalo Public Schools, Cheektowaga-Sloan Union Free School District, and Cleveland Hill Union Free School District, among others. Largely, WNY Bus Co and First Student got in such a competition over Maryvale's busing that it went to court.

In other regions in the area, they still compete, but not as bad to get large news coverage. Student Transportation of America holds a large base on Aero Drive in Cheektowaga, New York, so they have fought on transportation arrangements.

Niagara County, New York is largely under STA/Ridge Road Express jurisdiction, so there is only one WNY Bus Co base in the whole of Niagara County. It is located on Inducon Dr W in Sanborn, New York. Ridge Road Express operates for most, if not all the districts in the county.
