= SUNY Erie =

Community college in New York

- Former names: New York State Institute of Applied Arts and Sciences at Buffalo; Erie County Technical Institute; Erie Community College
- Type: Public community college
- Established: 1946; 80 years ago
- Parent institution: State University of New York
- Affiliations: National Junior College Athletic Association, Region III, Western New York Athletic Conference
- President: Adiam Tsegai
- Undergraduates: 8,529 (fall 2025)
- Location: Williamsville, New York, United States; 42.95932°N 78.721536°W
- Campus: Suburban 120 acres (0.49 km^{2})
- Colors: Red and black
- Nickname: Kats
- Mascot: Pawz
- Website: www.ecc.edu

SUNY Erie is a public community college with three campuses in western New York that serve residents in and near Erie County.

It is part of the State University of New York (SUNY) system and has locations in Williamsville (North Campus), Buffalo (City Campus within Old Post Office), and Orchard Park (South Campus).

The school's athletic teams are the Erie Kats. Athletic facilities include Burt Flickinger Center on the City Campus and West Herr Stadium on the South Campus.

== Notable alumni ==
- Antwon Burton, professional football player
- Sam Castronova, professional football player
- Ryan Ciminelli, professional bowler
- Arthur Eve, former Deputy Speaker of the New York State Assembly
- Jody Fortson, professional football player
- Joel Giambra, former county executive of Erie County, New York
- Mickey Harmon, artist
- Dean Evan Hart, optometrist
- Norman McCombs, businessman
- "Baby" Joe Mesi, professional boxer
- Michael Norwood, basketball player
- Pat Occhiuto, professional soccer player
- Michele Ragusa, actress
- Christopher Scanlon, former mayor of Buffalo, New York
- India Walton, former candidate for mayor of Buffalo, New York
- John Wojcik, professional baseball player
