= Cleveland Hill High School =

High school in New York, United States

Location
- 105 Mapleview Rd; Cheektowaga, (Erie County), New York 14225; United States
- Coordinates: 42.9415°N 78.7824°W

Information
- School type: Public school (government funded), High school
- Motto: "Grind and Rise, Rise and Grind."
- Opened: 1950
- School district: Cleveland Hill Union Free School District
- NCES District ID: 3607680
- Superintendent: David Evans
- CEEB code: 331343
- NCES School ID: 360768000549
- Principal: Michael Lobuzzetta
- Grades: 9–12
- Gender: Coeducational
- Enrollment: 398 (2024-2025)
- Campus: City: Small
- Colors: Blue and gold
- Song: ‘Alma Mater’ by Richard Siebold
- Fight song: ‘CHHS Victory Song’ by Richard Siebold
- Mascot: Golden Eagles
- Yearbook: Aerie
- Budget: $40,956,637 (2024-2025)

Cleveland Hill High School is a public high school located in Cheektowaga, Erie County, New York, United States, and is the only high school operated by the Cleveland Hill Union Free School District.
