= Cleveland Hill Union Free School District =

School district in the U.S. state of New York

Location
- Cheektowaga, Erie County, New York; United States
- Coordinates: 42.9415°N 78.7824°W

District information
- Type: Public
- Motto: Soar Towards Excellence
- Established: 1836
- Superintendent: David Evans

Students and staff
- Students: 1,365
- Faculty: 170
- District mascot: Golden Eagles
- Colors: Blue and gold

Other information
- Website: www.clevehill.org

Cleveland Hill Union Free School District is a K-12 school district within the Cleveland Hill hamlet of Cheektowaga, New York.

== Fire of 1954 ==
In 1954, a fire at the elementary school facility claimed the lives of 15 sixth-grade students, and severely burned Jackson C. Frank. The facility was made entirely of wood, prompting the United States to introduce code that prohibited wooden buildings from housing schools.

== Notable alumni ==
- Antwon Burton – Football player, 2015 ECC Hall of Fame Inductee (Class of 2001)
- Sal Capaccio – Buffalo Bills beat and sideline reporter for WGR (Class of 1991)
- Steve Fister – Musician, former lead guitarist of Steppenwolf (Class of 1975)
- Jackson C. Frank – Musician (Class of 1961)
- Kim Griffin – Head coach of Canisius Golden Griffins softball (Class of 2003)
- Mickey Harmon – Artist (Class of 2002)
- Nan Harvey – former Buffalo Bulls coach, 2012 Greater Buffalo Sports Hall of Fame Inductee (Class of 1974)
- Chae Hawk – Musician (Class of 2002)
- Damone Jackson – Musician (Class of 2009)
- Molly Kennedy – Motivational Speaker (Class of 1992)
- John Konsek – Golfer, 2015 NYSGA Hall of Fame Inductee (Class of 1958)
- James C. Litz – Artist (Class of 1966)
- Leia Militello – Broadcaster for WKBW-TV (Class of 1993)
- Jo Ann Miller – Miss New York 1973, illustration consultant (Class of 1971)
- Robert Nowak – Basketball player, 2004 ECC Hall of Fame Inductee (Class of 1966)
- Mark Parisi – Head coach of USCAA Champion Daemen Wildcats Women's Volleyball team (Class of 1980)
- Roger Peck – Founder and President of Crown Energy Services, Inc. (Class of 1968)
- Aaron Phillips – Professional baseball player (Class of 2014)
- Trevor Sajdak – Bodybuilder (Class of 1988)
- Christopher Scolese – Associate administrator of NASA (Class of 1974)
- Ashlee Thomas – Miss Howard University 2011 (Class of 2009)
- William Wieczorek – Director, Center for Health and Human Research at Buffalo State College (Class of 1977)
