= Blues Run the Game =

Single by Jackson C. Frank

from the album Jackson C. Frank
- B-side: "Can't Get Away From My Love"
- Released: 1965
- Recorded: July 1965
- Studio: CBS Studios, London
- Genre: Folk
- Length: 2:50
- Label: Columbia (EMI)
- Songwriter: Jackson C. Frank
- Producer: Paul Simon

"Blues Run the Game" is a 1965 song by the American singer-songwriter Jackson C. Frank. It was the opening track on his self-titled debut album.

== Cultural impact ==
Samples of the Jackson C. Frank original appear on the soundtrack of This Is Us, S01E03, "Kyle," and the full song is heard in the 2018 film, The Old Man and the Gun, as well as in the 7th episode of the second season of Britannia. The version of this song recorded by Simon and Garfunkel appears in the PBS documentary The Vietnam War by Ken Burns, in season 1, episode 7. The song most recently appeared in season 1, episode 5 of the 2024 TV series Poker Face.

=== Other versions ===
The song has been performed by various other artists, such as Simon and Garfunkel (on the CD box set Old Friends), Sandy Denny, Nick Drake (on Family Tree), John Renbourn and Eddi Reader, and later by Bert Jansch, Counting Crows, John Mayer, Colin Meloy, Robin Pecknold, Mark Lanegan, Laura Marling, Jack Steadman from Bombay Bicycle Club, Martin Simpson, Alela Diane (with Headless Heroes), Nick Harper.
