= Jackson C. Frank (album) =

Studio album by Jackson C. Frank
- Released: December 1965
- Recorded: July 1965
- Studios: CBS Studios, London
- Genre: Folk
- Length: 32:25
- Labels: Columbia/EMI; Castle Music
- Producer: Paul Simon

Singles from Jackson C. Frank
- 1. "Blues Run the Game" b/w "Can't Get Away From My Love" Released: 1965, Columbia DB7795

Jackson C. Frank is the debut album by Jackson C. Frank, released in December 1965 by Columbia (EMI). It was the only studio album he released in his lifetime.

== Background ==
The album was produced in 1965 by Paul Simon in London, and both Al Stewart and Art Garfunkel attended the recording.

The album features Frank on guitar and vocals with Simon and Stewart providing an occasional second guitar.

Frank was reportedly so nervous that in order to play and sing, he had to have screens around him. The album was recorded in less than three hours in London at CBS Studios.

== Legacy ==
Professional ratings
Review scores
Source	Rating
AllMusic	4.5/5 stars

Upon release, the album failed to chart and sold poorly. After the failure of the album, Frank attempted to track down Simon, who he believed owned the rights to his songs. He went into seclusion and died decades later, never having released another recording.

The album has been re-released under three different titles and four different cover arts. The first re-release was released in 1978 by B&C Records, changing the title to Jackson Again with a new illustrated cover. In 1996, the album was re-released as Blues Run the Game by Mooncrest on CD with a photograph of Frank. In 2001, a second CD edition was released by Castle Music on November 19, 2001 which restored the original title and cover. In 2013, the album was issued on CD with yet another alternate cover by Earth Recordings.

== Covers and media appearances ==
"Blues Run the Game" has been covered by artists including Simon and Garfunkel, Sandy Denny, Counting Crows, Bert Jansch, Nick Drake, Bonnie Dobson, Mark Lanegan and Laura Marling. The song also appeared in the film The Old Man & the Gun.

"I Want to Be Alone" (also known as "Dialogue") appeared on the soundtrack for the film Daft Punk's Electroma.

"Milk and Honey" appears in the film The Brown Bunny directed by Vincent Gallo and was also on the official soundtrack album for the film and heavily featured in the trailer for the movie.

"My Name Is Carnival" appears in the film Joker and is referenced in the dialogue.

== Track listing ==
All tracks are written by Jackson C. Frank except for "Kimbie," by Bascom Lamar Lunsford.

Side One
No.	Title	Length
1.	"Blues Run the Game"	3:34
2.	"Don't Look Back"	2:59
3.	"Kimbie"	3:16
4.	"Yellow Walls"	3:01
5.	"Here Come the Blues"	4:03

Side Two
No.	Title	Length
6.	"Milk and Honey"	3:39
7.	"My Name Is Carnival"	3:47
8.	"Dialogue (I Want to Be Alone)"	3:20
9.	"Just Like Anything"	2:23
10.	"You Never Wanted Me"	3:20
Total length:		32:25

1996 Mooncrest CD bonus tracks
No.	Title	Length
11.	"Marlene"	4:56
12.	"Marcy's Song"	4:30
13.	"The Visit"	4:58
14.	"Prima Donna of Swans"	5:16
15.	"Relations"	3:56
Total length:		56:01

== Personnel ==
- Jackson C. Frank – guitar, vocals
- Al Stewart – guitar picking on "Yellow Walls"

Production

- Producer: Paul Simon
- Liner notes: Jackson C. Frank, Bert Jansch

== Charts ==
Chart performance for Jackson C. Frank
Chart (2026)	Peak position
UK Independent Albums Breakers (OCC)	11
