= Neil Citron =

Canadian musician

- Born: Toronto, Ontario, Canada
- Genres: Heavy metal; hard rock
- Occupation: Musician
- Instrument: Guitar
- Formerly of: Hero; Lana Lane; Quiet Riot; BangTower; Black Cat 6
- Website: neilcitron.com

Neil Citron is a Toronto-born Canadian guitarist, Grammy Award-winning recording engineer, and songwriter who has played with Lana Lane, and briefly with heavy metal band Quiet Riot in 2006, among numerous other music industry credits. He has also worked on the films My Big Fat Greek Wedding, That Thing You Do!, and Ricki and the Flash.

== Early years: Lana Lane, Grammy Award, and Quiet Riot ==
At the age of seventeen, Citron cofounded the band Hero, which eventually released the albums Hero (1977) and Boys Will Be Boys (1978). In 1995, he joined the band of symphonic and progressive rock singer Lana Lane and played on several of her albums, including her 1995 debut, Love Is an Illusion as well as Curious Goods, released the following year. Touring would follow, resulting in the release of live material and several follow-up albums and the DVD Storybook: Tales from Europe and Japan, in which Citron is featured in both live performances and interviews.

By 2002, Citron became more involved in solo projects as well as extensive studio work with artists such as Steve Vai, Steve Lukather, and Larry Carlton. That year, he received a Grammy Award in the Best Pop Instrumental Album category for engineering No Substitutions: Live in Osaka by Larry Carlton and Steve Lukather.

In 2006, Citron joined Quiet Riot, playing guitar on, recording, mixing, and mastering the album Rehab. He left the band at the end of the year and was replaced by Alex Grossi. A musical relationship with Quiet Riot drummer Frankie Banali continued, and the duo recorded the blues rock albums I've Got the Blues (And It's All Your Fault) and Peanut Butter Fudge, both in 2012.

== Solo and band career ==
Citron released his debut solo album, Guitar Dreams in 1998. It was re-released with bonus material as In Search of Higher Ground in 2015. His second album, Absolute, came out in 2001, followed by Flavored Jam in 2006, which featured bassist Matt Bissonette and his brother Gregg on drums.

=== BangTower ===
In 2010, Citron formed the progressive rock group BangTower, with Welsh bassist Percy Jones and American drummer Walter Garces, and the trio released the album Casting Shadows in September of that year. In December 2016, BangTower issued their sophomore album, With N With Out. In August 2017, Citron released a seven-track digital-only BangTower EP titled Hey, Where'd Everybody Go?, this time without Jones and Garces. The album included Robbie Pagliari on bass and Frankie Banali on acoustic percussion. In September 2019, BangTower published the album The Road We Travel, which, in addition to Citron and Pagliari, featured drummer Rudd Weatherwax, with horns credited to Maynard J. Krebs.

=== Black Cat 6 ===
In late 2019, Citron teamed up with drummer Luke Fattore and bassist Jon Pomplin to form the rock band Black Cat 6. Their album Scratching My Itch was released in December 2019.

== Movie work ==
Citron has contributed music to a number of films throughout his career. He worked on the 1996 Tom Hanks movie That Thing You Do! as a musical instructor to the actors as well as performing guitar parts on the original band songs for the soundtrack. He also worked on the 2002 hit My Big Fat Greek Wedding as editor for the film and sound engineer on the commentary for the DVD release. In 2015, he worked on the Meryl Streep movie Ricki and the Flash as Streep's guitar mentor, as well as doing work on song composition, recording, and other sound duties.

While being credited with extensive work as a sound engineer and producer, notable is his custom-designed virtual guitar amplifier featured as part of Waves GTR3 from Waves Audio.

== Partial discography ==
=== Solo ===
- Guitar Dreams (1998)
- Absolute (2001)
- Flavored Jam (2006)

=== Hero ===
- Hero (1977)
- Boys Will Be Boys (1978)

=== Lana Lane ===
- Love Is an Illusion (1995)
- Curious Goods (1997)
- Garden of the Moon (1998)
- Echoes from the Garden (1998)
- Live in Japan (1998)
- Ballad Collection (1998)
- Queen of the Ocean (1999)
- Echoes from the Ocean (1999)
- Ballad Collection (2002)
- Project Shangri-La (2002)
- Covers Collection (2002)
- Storybook: Tales from Europe and Japan (DVD 2004)
- Return to Japan (2004)
- Lady Macbeth (2005)
- El Dorado Hotel (2012)

=== Erik Norlander ===
- Music Machine (2003)

=== Quiet Riot ===
- Rehab (2006)

=== BangTower ===
- Casting Shadows (2010)
- With N With Out (2016)
- Hey, Where'd Everybody Go? (EP, 2017)
- The Road We Travel (2019)

=== Citron-Banali ===
- I've Got the Blues and (It's All Your Fault) (2012)
- Peanut Butter Fudge (2012)

=== Black Cat 6 ===
- Scratching My Itch (2019)
