= Jackson C. Frank =

American folk musician (1943–1999)

- Frank in 1960

Background information
- Born: Jackson Carey Jones; March 2, 1943; Buffalo, New York, U.S.
- Died: March 3, 1999 (aged 56) Great Barrington, Massachusetts, U.S.
- Genre: Folk
- Occupations: Musician; singer-songwriter
- Instruments: Vocals; guitar
- Labels: Columbia (EMI); Mooncrest Records; Secret Records

Jackson Carey Frank (né Jones; March 2, 1943 – March 3, 1999) was an American singer-songwriter. He released his first and only album in 1965, produced by Paul Simon. He has been cited as an influence by many singer-songwriters, including Paul Simon, Sandy Denny, Bert Jansch, and Nick Drake. Rolling Stone journalist David Fricke called Frank "one of the best forgotten songwriters of the 1960s."

== Biography ==
=== Early life ===
Frank was born Jackson Carey Jones on March 2, 1943, in Buffalo, New York, the only child of Marilyn Rochefort Jones and Jack Jones, a test pilot. He later took on the surname of his stepfather, Elmer Frank, an army officer and food chemist. He was raised Christian, though he became atheist in later life.

On March 31, 1954, when Frank was eleven years old, a furnace exploded at his school, Cleveland Hill Elementary School in Cheektowaga, New York. The resulting fire killed fifteen of his fellow students, including Marlene du Pont, Frank's then girlfriend, about whom he would later write the song "Marlene", and whom he intended to name a second album after. Frank survived after escaping through a window, but had burns to over fifty percent of his body and had to stay in hospital for eight and a half months. His song "Yellow Walls" was written about his stay. The trauma from the burns also caused extensive damage to his parathyroid glands, resulting in an unregulated buildup of calcium in his body that led to extensive joint problems and caused a bent posture and pronounced limp that lasted the rest of his life.

During his hospital stay, he was introduced to music when a teacher, Charlie Castelli, brought Frank an acoustic guitar to keep him occupied during the recovery. He was influenced greatly by Elvis Presley as a teenager. He once received a letter and autograph from Presley, as well as a visit to all children injured in the fire from actor Kirk Douglas.

Due to Presley's rising popularity, a meet-and-greet with children from Cleveland Hill was cancelled. However, in 1957, Frank traveled to Memphis, Tennessee, with his mother and passed the singer's home, Graceland, coincidentally meeting Presley's father Vernon by the front gate. When Frank's mother explained who he was, he was taken inside the house to meet his idol.

In high school, he developed interests in history and writing. While trying his hand at poetry and novel writing, he decided he wanted to become a news reporter. He worked on-and-off for The Buffalo News throughout his later teenage years. During this, his passion for music grew, and he began performing at local coffeehouses and art galleries. He often added comic relief to his performances, such as arguing with his microphone, in an attempt to hide his stage fright.

In 1961, he enrolled at Gettysburg College and began studying journalism. There he met fellow musicians Mark Anderson and Tim Parsons. Together they formed a folk band called the D'Juray Singers, a name Frank coined but with no particular meaning. The three performed both covers and original songs for the college's radio station.

After just a few months in further education, Frank's grades began to decline and he dropped out in spring of 1962. When he was 21, he received an insurance payout of $110,500 ($1,147,000 today) for his injuries and spent the money carelessly. He quit his newspaper job, bought several cars and frequented clubs in Toronto with his friend John Kay. In February 1965, he made the decision to move to England with his girlfriend Kathy Henry, though they broke up shortly afterwards due to Frank's declining mental health.

=== Debut album ===
His eponymous 1965 album, Jackson C. Frank, was produced by Paul Simon while the two of them were living in England immersed in the burgeoning local folk scene. The album was recorded in six hours at Levy's Recording Studio, located at 103 New Bond Street in London. Frank was so shy during the recording that he asked to be shielded by screens so that Paul Simon, Art Garfunkel, and Al Stewart could not see him, claiming: 'I can't play. You're looking at me.' The best-known track from the sessions, "Blues Run the Game", was covered by Simon and Garfunkel, and later by Wizz Jones, Counting Crows, John Mayer, Mark Lanegan, Colin Meloy, Bert Jansch, Eddi Reader, Laura Marling, and Robin Pecknold (as White Antelope), while Nick Drake also recorded it privately. The song was also heard in the 2018 film The Old Man & the Gun, while his song "Milk and Honey" was heard in the 2003 film The Brown Bunny. "Milk and Honey" was also covered by Fairport Convention, Nick Drake, and Sandy Denny, whom he dated for some time. During their relationship, Jackson played a part in convincing Sandy to give up her nursing profession to concentrate on music full time.

Although Frank was well received in England for a while, in 1966 things took a turn for the worse as his mental health began to unravel. Frank's mental health declined so noticeably and completely that in early 1966 he entered St. John's Hospital in Lincoln for an evaluation. At the same time he began to experience writer's block. As his insurance payment was on the verge of running out he decided to go back to the United States for two years. When he returned to England in 1968 he seemed a different person to his friends. His depression, stemming from the childhood trauma of the classroom fire, had grown worse, and he had completely lost what little self-confidence he once possessed. Al Stewart recalled:

He [Frank] proceeded to fall apart before our very eyes. His style that everyone loved was melancholy, very tuneful things. He started doing things that were completely impenetrable. They were basically about psychological angst, played at full volume with lots of thrashing. I don't remember a single word of them – it just did not work. There was one review that said he belonged on a psychologist's couch. Then shortly after that, he hightailed it back to Woodstock again, because he wasn't getting any work.

=== Woodstock ===
While in Woodstock, he married Elaine Sedgwick, an English former fashion model and a cousin to Andy Warhol's protégé Edie Sedgwick. They opened a clothing shop together after Frank had another brief position with a newspaper. They had a son and later a daughter, Angeline. Their son was born with a rare lung condition and died the same day.

Possibly due to the death of his son, Frank's mental state began to spiral further. His relationship with Elaine became strained and eventually he began pursuing other women. It was by this time he'd begun to hear voices, believing them to be from "spiritual nudists," who inspired him to strip naked and run around the village. He was arrested a few times by the local police and was ultimately committed to a mental institution. His wife forbade him from returning home one day, and Angeline was raised until her teen years believing that her father was dead.

By the early 1970s, Frank had begun to beg aid from friends. He spent a while renting rooms and sleeping on couches. In 1971, a meeting was arranged with Art Garfunkel to share new material and potentially give him the rights to his unreleased song "Juliette." However, the disrespectful behaviour of Frank and the "hippie" friends he brought along made Garfunkel uncomfortable. He left the discussion early, never to return.

Frank then spent time playing for live broadcasts, as well as working an unpaid entertainment job for a local fair. During a particularly productive period, Frank managed to write multiple new songs as well as the opening of a potential book, which he'd named Society Doll. In 1975, Karl Dallas wrote an enthusiastic piece in the British weekly music newspaper Melody Maker, and in 1978, Frank's 1965 album was re-released as Jackson Again, with a new cover sleeve, although this did not in the end make his music much more popular outside of a small number of his fans.

As the medication given to him alleviated his paranoid symptoms, Frank made the decision to stop taking it. He soon began to run around naked again, sometimes wearing a cape and carrying a sword, naming himself after the Walter Scott character Lochinvar. He also began smoking marijuana. Once again, he ended up in a psychiatric hospital.

=== Later life and death ===
Frank lived with his parents in Elma, New York, for a few years in the early 1980s. People in the neighborhood were wary of him due to his odd behaviour, such as walking aimlessly on the 55-mph country roads and sitting in ditches for hours to pick at grass. However, he was "cut a lot of slack" due to his involvement in the Cleveland Hill fire. In 1984, his mother, who had been in hospital for open-heart surgery, returned home to find Frank missing with no note or forwarding address. Frank had gone to New York City in a desperate bid to find Paul Simon, but ended up homeless and sleeping on the sidewalk. During this time he found himself in and out of various psychiatric institutions.

Frank was treated for schizophrenia, a diagnosis denied by Frank himself (he maintained that he had depression caused by the trauma he had experienced as a child). Just as Frank's prospects seemed to be at their worst, a fan from the Woodstock area, Jim Abbott, discovered him in the early 1990s. Abbott had been discussing music with Mark Anderson, a teacher at the local college he was attending. The conversation had turned to folk music, which they both enjoyed, when Abbott asked the teacher if he had heard of Frank. He recollected:

I hadn't even thought about it for a couple of years, and he goes, "Well yes. As a matter of fact, I just got a letter from him. Do you feel like helping a down-on-his-luck folk singer?"

Frank, who had known Anderson from their days at Gettysburg College, had decided to write him to ask if there was anywhere in Woodstock he could stay after he had made up his mind to leave New York City. Abbott phoned Frank, and then organized a temporary placement for him at a senior citizens' home in Woodstock. Abbott was stunned by what he saw when he found Frank in New York:

When I went down I hadn't seen a picture of him, except for his album cover. Then, he was thin and young. When I went to see him, there was this heavy guy hobbling down the street, and I thought, 'That can't possibly be him'...I just stopped and said 'Jackson?' and it was him. My impression was, 'Oh my God', it was almost like the elephant man or something. He was so unkempt, disheveled. He had nothing. It was really sad. We went and had lunch and went back to his room. It almost made me cry, because here was a fifty-year-old man, and all he had to his name was a beat-up old suitcase and a broken pair of glasses. I guess his caseworker had given him a $10 guitar, but it wouldn't stay in tune. It was one of those hot summer days. He tried to play "Blues Run The Game" for me, but his voice was pretty much shot.

Soon after this, Frank found himself sitting on a bench in Queens while awaiting his move to Woodstock, when he was shot with a pellet gun and blinded through his left eye. At first, the shooter could not be found, but it was later determined that local kids had been firing the pellet gun indiscriminately at people, and Frank happened to be in the wrong place at the wrong time.

Abbott then promptly helped him move to Woodstock Manor. During this time, Frank received a check from Broadcast Music, Inc. and began recording some demos of new songs. Frank's resurfacing led to the first CD release of his self-titled album. In later pressings, Frank's demos from the 1970s were included as a bonus disc with the album, and an anthology entitled Blues Run the Game contained all these tracks as well as his final demos made in the 1990s. In 2013, Forest of Eden, an album of Frank's unreleased demos, was released through London based record label Secret Records. The collection includes his unheard song "Forest of Eden", alongside 1950s demo recordings of "Heartbreak Hotel"; two Christmas songs, called "Santa Bring My Baby Back To Me" and "Precious Lord" (with a spoken word greeting to his grandparents); and three home-recorded demos of his original songs made prior to his 1965 album - "I Want To Be Alone", "Here Comes The Blues", and "You Never Wanted Me". The only available recordings of Frank yet to be officially released are songs made for the BBC Radio 1 show Nightride in 1968, but they only exist as poor quality off-air sources.

Frank was later removed from Woodstock Manor for repeatedly urinating out of the window. He lived with Abbott for a while, but, in 1996, he narrowly avoided accidentally causing a house fire, so was moved to another psychiatric ward. After six months they could no longer keep him, and his family were in no fit state to look after him, so Abbott became his legal guardian.

Frank died in Timberlyn Heights, a nursing home in Great Barrington, Massachusetts, from a combination of pneumonia and cardiac arrest, on March 3, 1999, the day after his 56th birthday.

== Legacy ==
Though he never achieved fame during his lifetime, his songs have been covered by many well-known artists, including Simon and Garfunkel, John Mayer, Counting Crows, Nick Drake, Sandy Denny, Julie Felix, Bert Jansch, John Renbourn, Laura Marling, Chromatics, and Robin Pecknold. Nick Drake covered 4 songs from Frank's debut album; "Here Come the Blues", "Blues Run the Game", "Milk & Honey", and "Kimbie". These are found on Drake's posthumous release, Family Tree. Frank's song "I Want To Be Alone", also known as "Dialogue," appeared on the soundtrack for the film Daft Punk's Electroma. Soulsavers covered "Blues Run the Game" on their single "Revival" (7" vinyl, April 30, 2007). Marianne Faithfull covered Frank's arrangement of the traditional song "Kimbie" on her 2008 album Easy Come, Easy Go and included the song in the repertoire of her 2009 tour. Erland & The Carnival covered "My Name Is Carnival," apparently Frank's favourite song. Bert Jansch also covered this song as a gesture to Frank.

Sandy Denny covered "You Never Wanted Me" and "Milk and Honey" on the album It's Sandy Denny released by Saga Eros in 1970. Her song, "Next Time Around," contains coded references to Frank, her ex-boyfriend. "Marcy's Song" is played by Patrick, John Hawkes' character, in the 2011 film Martha Marcy May Marlene, and "Marlene" plays in the closing credits. Laura Barton's BBC Radio 4 programme Blues Run the Game, first broadcast November 20, 2012, included interviews with Al Stewart, John Renbourn, Jim Abbott and John Kay as well as archive material of Jackson C. Frank talking and singing.

South Korean jazz singer Na Yoon-sun covered "My Name Is Carnival" on her 2010 album Same Girl. "Milk and Honey" was sampled by Hidden Orchestra in their track "The Burning Circle" and by Hip Hop artist Nas in his track "Undying Love". French singer and Kora player Stranded Horse (Yann Tambour) covered "My Name Is Carnival" on his 2016 album Luxe.

Alt-country band Son Volt covered "Yellow Walls" in 2017. A previously lost song from his 1968 period called "Golden Mirror" was uploaded to YouTube in late 2017. "Blues Run the Game" is featured in the 2018 film The Old Man & the Gun. Colin Meloy performed "Blues Run The Game" in the 2013 musical/documentary Another Day, Another Time: Celebrating the music of "Inside Llewyn Davis" and in 2017 Brazilian film "Araby". "Horseshoe Crabs," a song on Hop Along's 2015 album Painted Shut, was inspired by the events of Frank's later life. "Just Like Anything" was covered by Malcolm Middleton (Arab Strap) on his 2008 album Sleight Of Heart. The electronic music band Chromatics covered "I Want To Be Alone" in 2019.

David Balfe's project For Those I Love samples the main hook from "Cryin' like baby" on the eponymous debut album's final track Leave Me Not Love. The album's themes concentrate on youth, friendship and grief, using the lyrical sample to convey the artist's feelings upon learning of the death of his best friend. Joshua Lee Turner covered "Blues Run The Game" on his YouTube channel in late 2018.

=== Film and television ===
- "Milk and Honey" featured on the soundtrack of Vincent Gallo's 2003 movie The Brown Bunny (and prominently in the movie's trailer).
- The American TV series This Is Us features "Blues Run the Game" in episode three, which first aired on October 11, 2016.
- "Blues Run The Game" is featured in the 2018 film The Old Man & The Gun
- "My Name Is Carnival" is briefly played in the 2019 film Joker. In a later scene, Joaquin Phoenix's character, Arthur, says, "I heard this song on the radio the other day, and the guy was singing that his name was Carnival. Which is crazy, because that’s my clown name at work."
- "Blues Run the Game" is featured on season 2, episode "Subterranean Fire" of Tin Star in 2019.
- "Blues Run the Game" is featured on season 2, episode 7 of Britannia in 2019.
- "Blues Run the Game" is featured on season 1, episode 5 ("Time of the Monkey") of Poker Face in 2023.
- "Blues Run the Game" version done by Laura Marling is featured on season 3, episode 1 of "Shoresy" in 2024
- "My Name Is Carnival" is featured in season 2, episode 2 "Iceberg" of Blue Lights in 2024.

== Discography ==
=== Studio albums ===
- Jackson C. Frank (1965)

=== Reissues and compilations ===
- Jackson Again, vinyl 1978, CD 1996, vinyl & CD 2001, 2 CD 2003
- Blues Run the Game (2003) 2 CD Anthology containing all (then) available recordings
- Forest of Eden (2013) (previously unreleased tracks and demos) from Secret Records
- Jackson C. Frank (2014) Earth Recordings
- Fixin to Die (2014) more previously unreleased tracks and demos
- Jackson C. Frank: The Complete Recordings (2015)
- Jackson C. Frank: American Troubadour (2020)

=== Singles ===
- "Blues Run the Game" / "Can't Get Away From My Love" (1965, 7")

== Filmography ==
- Blues Run the Game, a documentary by Damien Aimé Dupont (Burning Rooster Productions)
