= RRR (disambiguation) =

RRR is a 2022 Indian Telugu-language film.

RRR may also refer to:

== Art and entertainment ==
- RRR (soundtrack), soundtrack album of the film of the same name
- RRR: Behind and Beyond, documentary film about the production of the film of the same name
- RRRecords, a record label
- Roots Rock Riot, a 2007 album by Skindred
- Rhythm, Rhyme, Results, an educational music company based in Cambridge, Massachusetts, United States
- River Runs Red, the debut album from Brooklyn, New York band Life of Agony, released in 1993
- Triple R, common name of 3RRR, an Australian community music station based in Melbourne

== Finance ==
- Required rate of return, a value indicating the minimum return that investors expect from an investment
- Required reserve ratio, or reserve ratio requirement, a regulation that sets the minimum reserves each bank must hold to customer deposits and note

== Sport ==
- Red River Rivalry, the Oklahoma-Texas college football rivalry game
- Required run rate, a scoring statistic in limited-overs cricket
- Double R Racing, formerly Räikkönen Robertson Racing, a Formula 3 racing team

== Technology ==
- ROCKETSROCKETSROCKETS, a video game for Mac, Linux and Windows
- RRR Computers, Inc., a defunct American computer company based in Massachusetts
- Ridge Racer Revolution, a racing game developed by Namco
- Residual resistance ratio, a method to detect the amount of impurities in metal

== Other ==
- Rubicon Research Repository
- Ridiculously Resilient Ridge, a weather occurrence
- The three Rs, reading, 'riting and 'rithmetic, a basic education term
- Rotors running refueling, a method of hot refuelling helicopters
- Rayman Raving Rabbids, a Ubisoft game
- Relative risk reduction, a statistical term used in biostatistics and epidemiology
- Reed Research Reactor, a research nuclear reactor used by Reed College
- Regional Ring Road, a proposed ring road around Hyderabad, India

== See also ==
- 3R (disambiguation)
  - 3RR (disambiguation)
- R3 (disambiguation)
- R (disambiguation)
  - RR (disambiguation)
    - RRRR (disambiguation)
- RRRrrrr!!!, a 2004 French comedy film
