= List of equipment of the Armed Forces of Guatemala =

The following is the list of equipment used by the Armed Forces of Guatemala.

== Small arms ==
Name	Image	Caliber	Type	Origin	Notes
Pistols
M1911		.45 ACP	Semi-automatic pistol	United States	
Browning Hi-Power		9×19mm	Semi-automatic pistol	Belgium	
CZ-75		9×19mm	Semi-automatic pistol	Czechoslovakia	
Shotguns
Valtro PM5/350		12 gauge	Shotgun	Italy	Use by Kaibiles; stockless configuration with 350mm barrel
Submachine guns
Uzi		9×19mm	Submachine gun	Israel	
FMK-3		9×19mm	Submachine gun	Argentina	
MAC-10		9×19mm	Submachine gun	United States	
M3 Grease Gun		9×19mm	Submachine gun	United States	M3 and M3A1
Madsen M-50		9×19mm	Submachine gun	Denmark	
Beretta M12		9×19mm	Submachine gun	Italy	
Rifles
AKS-74U		5.45×39mm	Carbine; Assault rifle	Soviet Union	
Vz. 58		7.62×39mm	Assault rifle	Czechoslovakia	
IMI Galil		5.56×45mm	Assault rifle	Israel	15,000 rifles
Indumil Galil ACE		5.56×45mm	Assault rifle	Colombia; Israel	3,000 rifles
Galil Córdova		5.56×45mm	Assault rifle	Colombia	8,000 rifles
IWI CTAR21		5.56×45mm	Bullpup; Assault rifle	Israel	In use with Kaibiles
M16		5.56×45mm	Assault rifle	United States	M16A1 and M16A2
T65		5.56×45mm	Assault rifle	Taiwan	
Heckler & Koch HK33		5.56×45mm	Assault rifle	Germany	
ArmaLite AR-10		7.62×51mm	Battle rifle	United States	
Machine guns
Daewoo K3		5.56×45mm	Light machine gun	South Korea	
Browning M1919		7.62×51mm	Medium machine gun	United States	
Browning M2		.50 BMG	Heavy machine gun	United States	
FN MAG		7.62×51mm	General-purpose machine gun	Belgium	
Rocket propelled grenade launchers
M20 Super Bazooka		60mm	Rocket-propelled grenade	United States	
Grenade launchers
M203		40×46mm	Grenade launcher	United States	
M79		40×46mm	Grenade launcher	United States	

== Anti-tank weapons ==
Name	Image	Type	Origin	Caliber	Notes
M18		Recoilless rifle	United States	57mm	
M40A1		Recoilless rifle	United States	105mm	56 in service
M-1968		Recoilless rifle	Argentina	105mm	64 in service

== Boats ==
Name	Image	Type	Origin	Quantity	Notes
Golfo de Tribuga-class landing craft		Landing Craft Utility	Colombia	1	

Other boats

1 Kukulcan Gc 1051 (105-foot patrol boat)
1 Patrol vessel GC-871 "Hunahpú" of 87 feet in length
1 Gucumatz Hydrographic Boat
2 Dabur class patrol boats (Gc 851, Gc 852, Gc 853)
6 Cutlass class patrol boats (Gc 651-656)
02 Machete-class Landing Craft (D-361, D-362)
08 Low Draft River Operation Boats - BOFBC
08 Vigilant Class Patrol Boats (GC-271 - GC-278)
20 Boston Whaler Interceptors
06 Midnight Express Interceptors
08 Metal Shark River Patrol Boats
22 LP Patrol Boats
45 River Patrol Boats of the Imemsa and Astimar Classes.
3 Silver Ship Inc. 43-foot Coastal Fast Response Boats (CFRBs)
3 Silver Ship Inc. 43-foot Coastal Fast Response Boats (CFRBs)donated to the Pacific Naval Command.
1 Zodiac Hurricane rigid inflatable boat.
20 Zodiac inflatable boats with motors.

== Reconnaissance ==
Name	Image	Type	Origin	Quantity	Notes
RBY Mk 1		Reconnaissance vehicle	Israel	10	
M8 Greyhound		Armored car	United States	12	

== Armored personnel carriers ==
Name	Image	Type	Origin	Quantity	Notes
M113A1/A2		Armored personnel carrier	United States	15	
Cadillac Gage Commando		Armored personnel carrier	United States	7	
Armadillo		Armored personnel carrier	Guatemala	30	
Pit-Bull VX		Armored personnel carrier	United States	4	

== Utility vehicles ==
Name	Image	Type	Origin	Quantity	Notes
AIL Abir		Utility vehicle	Israel	20	
M151		Utility vehicle	United States	Unknown	
Jeep CJ-7		Utility vehicle	United States	Unknown	
Jeep J8		Utility vehicle	United States	250	
Mazda BT-50		Utility vehicle	Japan	Unknown	
Trucks
M35		Utility truck	United States	Unknown	
M54		Utility truck	United States	Unknown	

== Artillery ==
Name	Image	Type	Origin	Quantity	Notes
Mortars
M224		Mortar	United States	625	
Field artillery
M-56		Howitzer	Yugoslavia	56	
M101		Howitzer	United States	54	24 M2A1; 30 M101

== Air defence systems ==
Name	Image	Type	Origin	Quantity	Notes
Zastava M55		Anti-aircraft gun	Yugoslavia	16	
Bofors L/60		Autocannon	Sweden	Unknown	
Blowpipe		MANPADS	United Kingdom	82	

== Historical equipment ==
=== Rifles ===
- Mosin-Nagant
- Karabiner 98k
- vz. 24
- vz. 33
- M1 Carbine

=== Sniper rifles ===
- FN Model 30-11

=== Submachine gun ===
- MP 38/40
- M1A1 Thompson
- Sa 23

=== Machine guns ===
- M1917 Browning
- MG 34
- ZB-53
- ZB vz. 30

=== Anti tank weapons ===
- M67 recoilless rifle

=== Tanks ===
- 7 M3 Stuart
- 10 M41 Walker Bulldog
- 8 AMX-13/75

=== Field artillery ===
- M116
- M48 Tito Gun

=== Anti-aircraft artillery ===
- QF 1-pounder pom-pom

== Works cited ==
- Ball, Robert W. D. (2011). Mauser Military Rifles of the World. Iola: Gun Digest Books. ISBN 9781440228926.
- English, Adrian J. (1984). Armed Forces of Latin America: Their Histories, Development, Present Strength, and Military Potential. London: Jane's Publishing Inc. ISBN 9780710603210.
- Foss, Christopher F, ed. (1990). Jane's Infantry Weapons 1990−1991 (11th ed.). Coulsdon, Surrey: Jane's Defence Data. ISBN 978-0-7106-0909-0.
- International Institute for Strategic Studies (February 2016). The Military Balance 2016. Vol. 116. Routlegde. ISBN 978-1-85743-835-2.
