= RXR =

RXR may stand for

- RXR Realty, an American company
- Retinoid X receptor, a type of nuclear receptor
- W10-1 sign in MUTCD
- Revco, an American company, NYSE code RXR
- Level crossing

== See also ==
- RR (disambiguation)
- R2 (disambiguation)
- 2R (disambiguation)
- R (disambiguation)
