= JFW =

JFW may refer to:

- Jafarwala railway station, in Pakistan
- Jakarta Fashion Week
- Jamaica Federation of Women
- JAWS for Windows
- Junior Forest Wardens
