= R30 =

R30 or R-30 may refer to:

== Automobiles ==
- Nissan Skyline (R30), a Japanese mid-size car
- Renault 30, a French executive car
- Renault R30, a Formula One racing car
- Toyota LiteAce (R30), a Japanese van
- Venucia R30, a Chinese hatchback

== Roads ==
- R30 road (Belgium)
- R30 (South Africa)

== Other uses ==
- R-30 — dichloromethane
- R30 (New York City Subway car)
- Herero language
- HMS Carron (R30), a destroyer of the Royal Navy
- R30: 30th Anniversary World Tour, a live DVD by the Canadian band Rush
- R30: Can become highly flammable in use, a risk phrase
- Renard R.30, a Belgian prototype airliner
- Roussel R-30, a French prototype fighter-bomber
- RSM-56 Bulava, a Russian submarine-launched ballistic missile
- Small nucleolar RNA R30/Z108
- ThinkPad R30, a ThinkPad R series laptop

== See also ==
- R3.0 (album), a 2017 album by Regine Velasquez
- R3.0 (concert), a 2017 concert by Regine Velasquez
- R3 (disambiguation)
- R (disambiguation)
