= R&R =

R&R, R & R, or R and R usually refers to R&R (military), a military abbreviation for "rest and recuperation" or "rest and relaxation". It may also refer to:

== Arts and entertainment ==
- "R n' R", a 1987 song by Faith No More from Introduce Yourself
- R&R (EastEnders), a fictional nightclub in EastEnders
- R&R (magazine), a music trade magazine
- R&R (Rare & Remixed), a 2001 compilation album by BT
- "R&R" (Space: Above and Beyond episode)

== Organizations ==
- R&R Films (disambiguation), several film companies
- R&R Ice Cream, UK-based ice cream manufacturer
- R&R Market, a grocery store in San Luis, Colorado
- R&R Partners, an advertising, marketing, public relations, and public affairs firm
- Refuse & Resist!, an American human rights activist group

== See also ==
- Rich & Rare, a brand of Canadian whisky produced by the Sazerac Company
- R&R Colony Ponnathota, a village in Andhra Pradesh, India
- RR (disambiguation)
- RNR (disambiguation)
