= Bravia (disambiguation) =

Bravia is a range of televisions from Sony.

Bravia can also refer to:

- Bravia (automobile), a Portuguese vehicle manufacturer
  - Bravia Chaimite, a Portuguese armored vehicle
