= 3R =

3R or three Rs may refer to:

- The three Rs, the basic elements of a primary school curriculum: reading, 'riting (writing), and 'rithmetic (arithmetic)
- The three Rs, the waste management hierarchy: reduce, reuse, and recycle
- The three Rs, consumer remedies under Australian Consumer Law when consumer guarantees of goods are not satisfied: refund, replace, and repair
- The three Rs (animal research), principles for ethical use of animals in testing: replacement, reduction, refinement
- Ronaldo, Rivaldo, and Ronaldinho, dubbed "The three Rs", the main attacking trio of Brazil at the 2002 FIFA World Cup
- The 3Rs, an experimental short film by David Lynch
- 3R Computers, Inc., a defunct American computer company based in Massachusetts
- 3R (optical regenerator), an optical communications repeater that performs reamplification, reshaping, and retiming
- Intelsat 3R, a former communications satellite
- Yaesu VX-3R, an ultra-compact dual-band amateur radio transceiver
- British Rail Class 206, Southern Region designation 3R from 3-car Reading Line stock
- 3R (print size), a standard consumer print size for photographs
- The 3Rs of Junior Forest Wardens (a Canadian outdoor-education program for families): Responsibility to yourself, Responsibility to others, Responsibility to your community and the planet
- Return, Reclamation, Rehabilitation, rebel group in Central African Republic
- Relief, recovery, and reform, categories of program under the New Deal

== See also ==
- RRR (disambiguation)
- R3 (disambiguation)
- 3RS, part of the Hong Kong International Airport Master Plan 2030
- Reading, Writing and Arithmetic, 1990 album by English alternative rock band The Sundays
