= OTO Melara R3 Capraia =

Italian amphibious scout vehicle

The R3 Capraia was a light 4x4 amphibious scout car developed by OTO Melara in the early 1980s for the Italian military and international export industry. The R3 had a maximum road speed of about 74 mph and a maximum speed on water of 3.7 mph. At least 6 variants of the vehicle with varying armaments were proposed by OTO Melara. The vehicle was based on the chassis of the moderately successful Gorgona R2.5.

== History and design ==
The limited but not insignificant commercial success of the Gorgana R2.5 led OTO Melara to authorize a larger, more heavily armored evolution of the vehicle, this time intended for use in Italy's domestic army. The nature of the army's requirements led to the new vehicle, which received the designation R3 Capraia (presumably named after the third largest island in the Tuscan Archipelago.), retained the base chassis from the R2.5. In addition, the two projects shared technologies and ideas. The vehicle was not purchased by any service, domestic or foreign.

=== Engine and drivetrain ===
Among those technologies and ideas was the drivetrain, a biaxial 4-wheel layout with all wheels powered and front-axle steering. The basic layout of the powerplant and drivetrain also remained the same as on the R2.5: The 95 hp Fiat 8144.81.200 engine and parts of the transmission unit remained in the rear of the vehicle with a driveshaft at the bottom of the vehicle transferring power to the front axle. The vehicle featured an automatic transmission, 2-speed transfer case, and a manual-locked differential. The cooling system consisted of 2 radiators with air being cycled by a two-fan air conveyor driven by the engine by V-belts Control systems, suspension, etc. remained unchanged from the R2.5.

On the base chassis of the vehicle a new armored hull of original design was mounted. The armored hull was visual similar, while technological distinct from that of the Fiat CM6614, but slightly smaller. The R3's armored hull was noteworthy for being fabricated using virtually identical processes and techniques as the R2.5, simplifying production and acting as a potential marketing advantage for OTO Melara. In this case, however, the body of the armored car R3 Capraia was assembled from thicker sheets. The maximum thickness of the aluminum armor reached up to 32 mm. The use of armor of such thickness made it possible to protect the crew and components of the vehicle from the majority of small arms at any range, and even heavy machine guns from certain distances.

The R3 Capraia interestingly did not use any cast or even shaped metal, instead having a body consisting of several flat aluminum armor plates installed at varying angles. The upper hull had a large frontal sheet mounted at a high angle from the vertical, as well as moderately inclined sides. The upper glacis had two headlights of distinctive shape. The engine deck consisted of three sheets. In the middle of the rearmost vertical plate was a louvered window for cooling the engine. The roof of the R3 was made in an interesting way. The front section, starting at the upper front hull plate, was installed at a lower height than the rest of the roof, with a semi-cupola featuring 5 vision blocks for the driver. The vehicle featured a door on either side of the hull which followed the contours of the body. Each door was flanked on both sides by a glass vision block and what appear to be firing ports. In the roof of the R3, to the rear and either side of the armament mount, are two periscopes providing forward observation, with a further two at the very rear facing backwards. The vehicle commander had a low-profile cupola with 6 periscopes mounted on the upper hull roof just behind the driver's cupola, offset to the right slightly. Both the drivers and commanders cupolas had an ingress/egress hatch.

== Variants ==
The OTO Melara R3 Capraia was offered by the manufacturer in the following configurations:

- T7.62 F — Variant with a remotely operated 7.62mm machine gun.
- T12.7 F — Variant with a manned turret capable of mounting a heavy machine gun.
- T20 FA-HS — Variant with a remotely operated Oerlikon KAD-B17, that being a specialized right-feed, single mount version of the Hispano-Suiza HS.820 renamed after the Swiss company acquired Hispano-Suiza in 1970. The mounting on the T20 could elevate to 60° and depress to -10°.
- Folgore x2 FA — Variant with two Breda Folgore 80mm recoilless rifles and a 7.62mm machine gun.
- T106 x2 FA — Variant with two 105mm M40 recoilless rifles. "Tx" denoted the caliber of the weapons, but the M40 actually had a bore of 105mm, the US Military designated the M40 as 106mm to avoid confusion with the earlier M27 recoilless rifle, as the two weapons did not share a common ammo type.
- Official designation unavailable — Variant mounting some type of TOW anti-tank guided missile system, ostensibly based on the previous two recoilless rifle systems. The turret had a full 360° of traverse and elevation angles of -7° and +10°.

== See also ==
- Fiat CM6614
- Armored car (military)
- Scout car
- Hispano-Suiza HS.820
- War Thunder

=== Vehicles of comparable performance or role ===
- Cadillac Gage Commando
- M1117 armored security vehicle
- BRDM-2
- Humber Pig
- Bravia Chaimite
- Ferret armoured car
- EE-3 Jararaca
- Puma 4x4
