= R03 =

R03 may refer to:

- AAA battery
- Alkali Lake State Airport in Lake County, Oregon
- ATC code R03, a subgroup of the Anatomical Therapeutic Chemical Classification System

== See also ==
- R3.0 (album), a 2017 album by Regine Velasquez
- R3.0 (concert), a 2017 concert by Regine Velasquez
- ro-3 (disambiguation)
- R30 (disambiguation)
- R3 (disambiguation)
- R (disambiguation)
