= R2 =

R2, R02, R.II, R-2, or similar may refer to:

== Arts, media, and entertainment ==
- R2-D2, a character from Star Wars films and books, nickname R2
- Code Geass: Lelouch of the Rebellion R2, a 2008 anime series
- Resistance 2, a video game
- Region 2, a DVD region code
- BBC Radio 2, a British radio station

=== Music ===
- R2 (Rock'n'Reel), a British music magazine
- Relapse 2, a 2009 album by rapper Eminem
- Patricio Rey y sus Redonditos de Ricota or R2, an Argentine rock band

== Science and technology ==
- R2: Risk of explosion by shock, friction, fire or other sources of ignition, a risk phrase in chemistry

=== Mathematics ===
- R^{2} or r^{2} (pronounced R-squared), the coefficient of determination of a linear regression in statistics
- R^{2}, the two-dimensional real coordinate space

=== Biology and medicine ===
- R2 RNA element, a cis-acting element identified in R2 retrotransposons which is involved in priming the reverse transcription process
- ATC code R02 Throat preparations, a section of the Anatomical Therapeutic Chemical Classification System
- Haplogroup R2 (Y-DNA), a human Y-chromosome haplogroup
- receptor 2, the second in line of a series of cellular receptors, generally at the end of an acronym
- Gangrene (ICD-10 code)

=== Computing ===
- Robonaut 2, a NASA humanoid robotic development project
- R2 signalling, a family of telephony protocols for line and register signalling
- .r02, a RAR file extension
- Radare2, an open source reverse engineering framework also known as r2

== Transportation ==
- Orenburg Airlines (IATA code)

=== Roads ===
- Radial Road 2 or R-2, an arterial road of Manila, Philippines
- Autopista Radial R-2, a Spanish radial motorway connecting Madrid to Guadalajara and passing through Alcobendas and connecting to N-320
- R2 expressway (Slovakia)
- R2 Marine–Willingdon, an express bus route in Metro Vancouver, British Columbia, Canada
- R2 road (Zimbabwe), a road connecting Plumtree and Harare

=== Railroads ===
- R2 (Rodalies de Catalunya), a commuter rail line in Barcelona, Catalonia, Spain
- R2 (RER Vaud), an S-Bahn line in the canton of Vaud

==== Southeastern Pennsylvania Transportation Authority (SEPTA) ====
- Wilmington/Newark Line (R2 Wilmington/Newark line)
- Warminster Line (R2 Warminster line)

=== Vehicles ===
==== Land vehicles ====
- R2, a sub-class of Group R rally cars
- Jaguar R2, Jaguar Racing's car for the 2001 Formula One season
- ORA R2, a Chinese electric city car
- Panzer 35(t), a Czech tank whose Romanian model was known as the R-2
- Rivian R2, an upcoming all-electric mid-size SUV
- Subaru R2, a 2003 Japanese car

==== Air vehicles ====
- DFW R.II, a 1918 German bomber aircraft
- Fiat R.2, a 1919 Italian reconnaissance aircraft
- Linke-Hofmann R.II, a World War I German bomber aircraft
- Polikarpov R-2, a Soviet Union copy of the 1931 British Airco DH.9A light bomber aircraft
- Ross R-2 Ibis, a glider

==== Water vehicles ====
- HMS Zest (R02), a World War II British Royal Navy Z-class destroyer
- USS R-2 (SS-79), a 1918 R-class coastal and harbor defense submarine of the US Navy

== Other uses ==
- R-2 (missile), an improved version of German V-2 rocket manufactured by the Soviet Union
- R2 is a rank of United States research university in the Carnegie Classification of Institutions of Higher Education

== See also ==
- Windows Server 2003 R2
- Windows Server 2008 R2
- SQL Server 2008 R2
- RR (disambiguation)
- 2R (disambiguation)
- R–2R ladder, a resistor ladder
