= RRRR =

RRRR may refer to:

- the reporting mark for the Rock and Rail LLC
- Raritan River Railroad
- the morse code for surface raider, used in conjunction with SOS

== See also ==
- R (disambiguation)
  - RR (disambiguation)
    - RRR (disambiguation)
- R4 (disambiguation)
- 4R (disambiguation)
- RRRrrrr!!!, a 2004 French comedy film
