= Ro-3 =

Ro-3 may refer to:

- Japanese submarine Ro-3, an Imperial Japanese Navy submarine in commissioned in 1922 and stricken in 1932
- Type F submarine, an Imperial Japanese Navy submarine class whose F2 subclass sometimes is called the Ro-3 class

== See also ==
- R03 (disambiguation)
