= RNR (disambiguation) =

RNR is the Royal Naval Reserve, the volunteer reserve force of the Royal Navy in the United Kingdom.

RNR may also refer to:

- Ribonucleotide reductase
- Right node raising, in linguistics, a mechanism that sees parallel structures share material to their immediate right
- Rock and roll, a genre of music
- Royal Newfoundland Regiment, a regiment of the Canadian Army
- "RnR", a franchise of the FGL Sports
- R n R, an album by Richard Elliot and Rick Braun
- the risk-need-responsivity model of offender treatment
- Rock'n'Reel, a former name of music magazine RNR

== See also ==
- R&R (disambiguation)
