= Bravia (automobile) =

Portuguese vehicle manufacturer

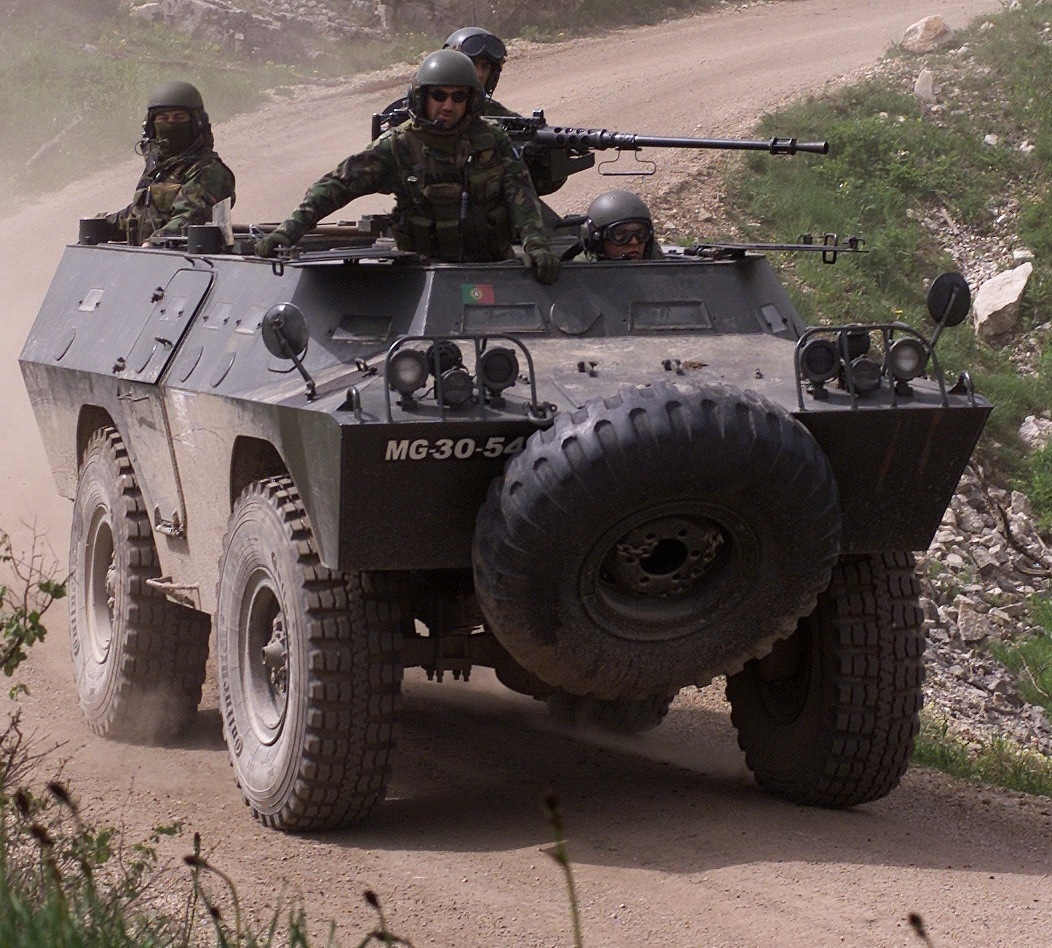
Bravia Chaimite APC was sold to 6 countries.

Bravia–Sociedade Luso-Brasileira de Veículos e Equipamentos, S.A.R.L was a Portuguese vehicle manufacturer. Founded in 1967 by Portuguese Army major João Donas-Botto.

== History ==
In 1967, Portugal tried to acquire military vehicles from the United States, but was denied due to Portugal's intentions of using those outside of NATO's intentions. Looking for an alternative, Minister of the Army Joaquim da Luz Cunha contacted major João Donas-Botto with the intention of producing an alternative. After travelling to the US and meeting with contacts, Donas-Botto founded Bravia SARL.

The Portuguese Estado Novo illegally acquired a V-100 Commando and Donas-Botto brought two Cadillac employees with schematics of the vehicle. With this technical knowledge, Bravia produced its best known product, the wheeled APC Bravia Chaimite. The first models would be built in Belém, Lisbon, with hulls being made by Sorefame, and later at Bravia's new factory at Samora Correia.

In 1970, Bravia gets its first export contract by supplying Chaimite APCs to Peru, also managing to sell the military trucks Leopardo 6x6 to the country in 1972. In the same year, Bravia offers both the Leopardo 6x6 and the light vehicle Gazela 4x4 to the Portuguese Army, but eventually the company reacquired those for sale in the civilian market. They also produced the Comando MKIII Armoured Car with the intention of selling it to the National Republican Guard, but these plans fell through with the acquisition of 34 Shorland armoured cars from Northern Ireland. The two prototypes of the Comando still exist.

In the 1980s, despite selling Chaimites to Lebanon in the 1980s and later to Libya and the Philippines, the financial situation of Bravia worsened. In 1985, Portugal chose Cadillac-Gage to modernize its Chaimites instead of Bravia. In 1987, the company entered a Bankruptcy process. The remaining materials from Bravia were taken by the Portuguese Army's OGMEs (General Workshops of Engineering Materials)

== Vehicle models ==
- Bravia Elefante 6X6
- Bravia Leopardo 6X6
- Bravia Gazela 4X4
- Bravia Pantera 6X6
- Bravia Tigre 6X6
- Bravia Kaiser Jeep M-201 4X4
- Bravia Comando MK III Armoured Car 4X4
- Bravia Chaimite Armoured Personnel Carrier 4X4

== See also ==
- Military of Portugal
- List of weapons of the Portuguese Colonial War
- List of weapons of the Lebanese Civil War
