= R3 =

R3, R.III or R-3 or R/3 may refer to:

== Aviation ==
- Aviatik R.III, a German aircraft
- DFW R.III, a World War I German bomber aircraft
- Loring R-III, a Spanish reconnaissance biplane
- Ross R-3 glider
- Tupolev R-3 Soviet reconnaissance aircraft
- Yakutia Airlines IATA airline designator

== Entertainment ==
- BBC Radio 3, a radio operated by the BBC within the United Kingdom
- R3 (TV series), produced by the BBC between 1964 and 1965
- Region 3, the DVD region code for Southeast Asia, South Korea, Republic of China (Taiwan), Hong Kong, Macau
- Resistance 3, the third game in the Resistance series
- R3 (video game), a computer game for the Amiga series of computers in 1995

== Military ==
- Version of the German Rheintochter ground to air missile
- R-3 (missile), an abandoned Soviet ICBM design from the late '40s.
- K-13 (missile), the Vympel K-13, an air-to-air missile also known as R-3S in Soviet service
- R-3 tank, a proposed Romanian tank design for use in World War II
- R3 Capraia, a proposed Italian armored scout car design of the 1980s
- USS R-3, a 1919 R-class coastal and harbor defense submarine of the United States Navy

== Math and science ==
- R3: Extreme risk of explosion by shock, friction, fire or other sources of ignition, a risk phrase in chemistry
- R-3 process, a chromogenic photo process for making Type R prints
- R3 or receptor 3, the third in line of a series of cellular receptors, generally at the end of an acronym
- R^{3}, the three-dimensional real coordinate space in mathematics
- R^{3}, three-dimensional space, the Euclidean space of real numbers in three dimensions
- R3, three-dimensional space group number 146
- R3̅, three-dimensional space group number 148

== Transportation ==
- R3 expressway (Czech Republic), a road connecting Kaplice and the border with Austria
- R3 expressway (Slovakia), a road connecting Krupina and Zvolen
- R3 (RER Vaud), an S-Bahn line in the canton of Vaud
- Radial Road 3 or R-3, an arterial road of Manila, Philippines
- R-3 motorway (Spain), a road connecting Madrid and Tarancón
- R3 (SEPTA), a former commuter rail line in and near Philadelphia, Pennsylvania, which has been split into:
  - Media/Wawa Line (R3 Media/Elwyn, formerly R3 West Chester),
  - West Trenton Line (SEPTA) (R3 West Trenton)
- R3 (ring road) in Belgium
- R3 (Rodalies de Catalunya), a commuter rail line in Barcelona, Catalonia, Spain
- R3 Lougheed Hwy, an express bus route in Metro Vancouver, British Columbia, Canada
- R3 road (Zimbabwe), a road connecting Chirundu with Harare

== Other uses ==
- Ågesta Nuclear Plant, also known as R3, was the third nuclear reactor built in Sweden
- Jaguar R3, a car made by Jaguar Racing for the 2002 Formula One season
- Leica R3, a 1976 35mm SLR camera
- Reduce, reuse, recycle
- SAP R/3, the previous designation for an enterprise resource planning software produced by SAP AG; the new name is SAP ERP
- Yamaha YZF-R3
- ISO Recommendation R3, a forerunner to the international standard ISO 3
- Canon EOS R3, a Canon full-frame mirrorless interchangeable-lens camera
- Proton R3, former motorsport and performance division of the Malaysian automotive brand Proton
- Rivian R3, a battery electric compact SUV

== See also ==
- R3.0 (album), a 2017 album by Regine Velasquez
- R3.0 (concert), a 2017 concert by Regine Velasquez
- R03 (disambiguation)
- 3R (disambiguation)
- R (disambiguation)
