= FN Model 30-11 =

FN 30-11
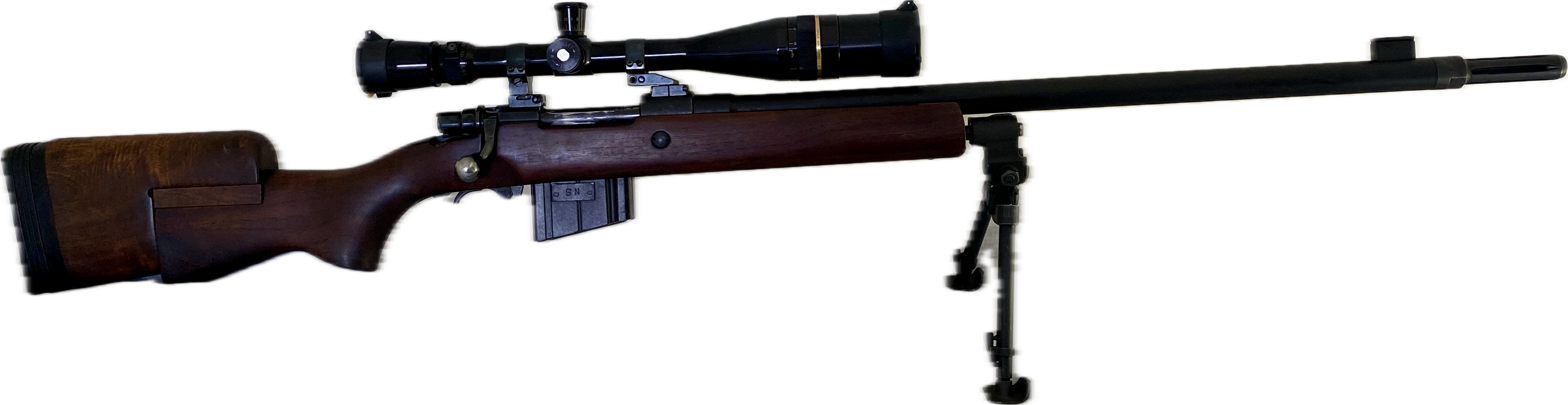
- FN 30-11 configuration 1978
- Type: Sniper rifle
- Place of origin: Belgium

Service history
- Used by: See Users
- Wars: Cold War

Production history
- Manufacturer: Fabrique Nationale de Herstal
- Produced: 1976–1986
- Variants: 1975, 1978, 1981

Specifications
- Mass: 4.85 kg (10.7 lb) empty, without scope or bipod
- Length: 1,117 mm (44.0 in) barrel 502 mm (19.8 in)
- Cartridge: 7.62×51mm NATO
- Action: Bolt action
- Rate of fire: Single
- Muzzle velocity: 850 m/s (2,789 ft/s)
- Feed system: 5-round internal or external FAL 10-round magazine

The FN Model 30-11 is a Belgian bolt-action sniper rifle, manufactured between 1976 and 1986.

Derived from the FN Model 30, based on the Mauser action dating to the G98, with three-piece bolt and a five-round magazine. The trigger and stock are both adjustable, the stock by means of butt spacers. The furniture is wood. The rifle features a flash hider, as well as a standard rear-folding bipod (same as the FN MAG). The standard sights are micrometer-adjustable iron, but the usual fitting is an Anschütz four-power 28 mm (1.1 in) telescope; a nightscope can be fitted, if desired.

No longer manufactured by FN, the Model 30-11 remains in service with Belgian police and military.

== History ==
The rifle was introduced in 1975. FN's marketing was predominantly geared towards law enforcement, but the Model 30-11 was also shown to military customers. It was mainly marketed by FN's Departement Police (department for police).

=== Midlife update ===
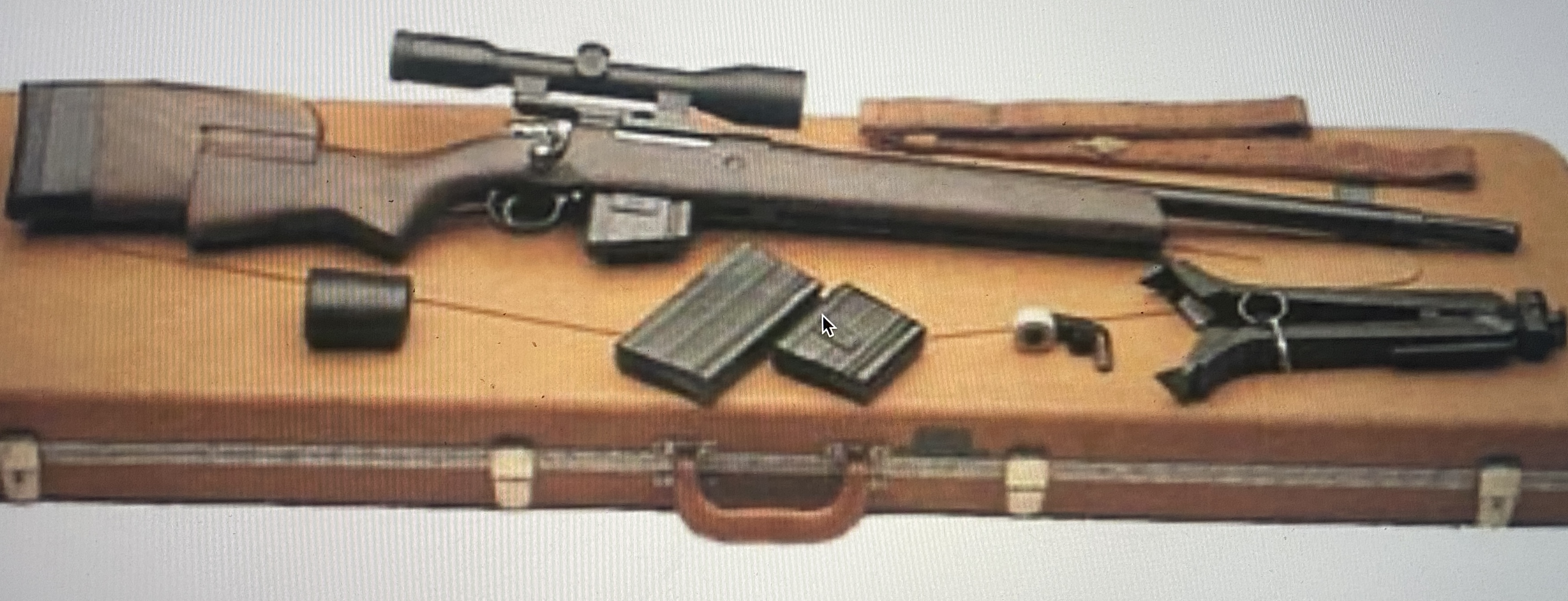
FN 30-11 configuration 1975 with case and FN MAG bi-pod

Unlike standard FN Mauser contracts, the Model 30-11 was not built to order. FN kept an amount of rifles and parts in stock due to the specialized features and components sourced from contractors. FN purchased quite a few parts and accessories from vendors including the US. Model 1907 pattern sling, the German built 4×24mm scope, the night vision scope, the Anschutz target sights and UIT rail system with removable sling swivel, and the travel case, which was sourced from US suppliers.

Customers had the option of purchasing the rifle with an internal 5-round magazine or removable 10-round magazine. The 10—round magazine was a modified FN FAL magazine that fit in a special trigger—guard. The removable 30-11 magazines did not function with the FAL rifle. The rifles were given serial numbers and not contract numbers. FN offered the entire system as a package. A customer had the option to buy the entire package or select specific components.

== Design ==
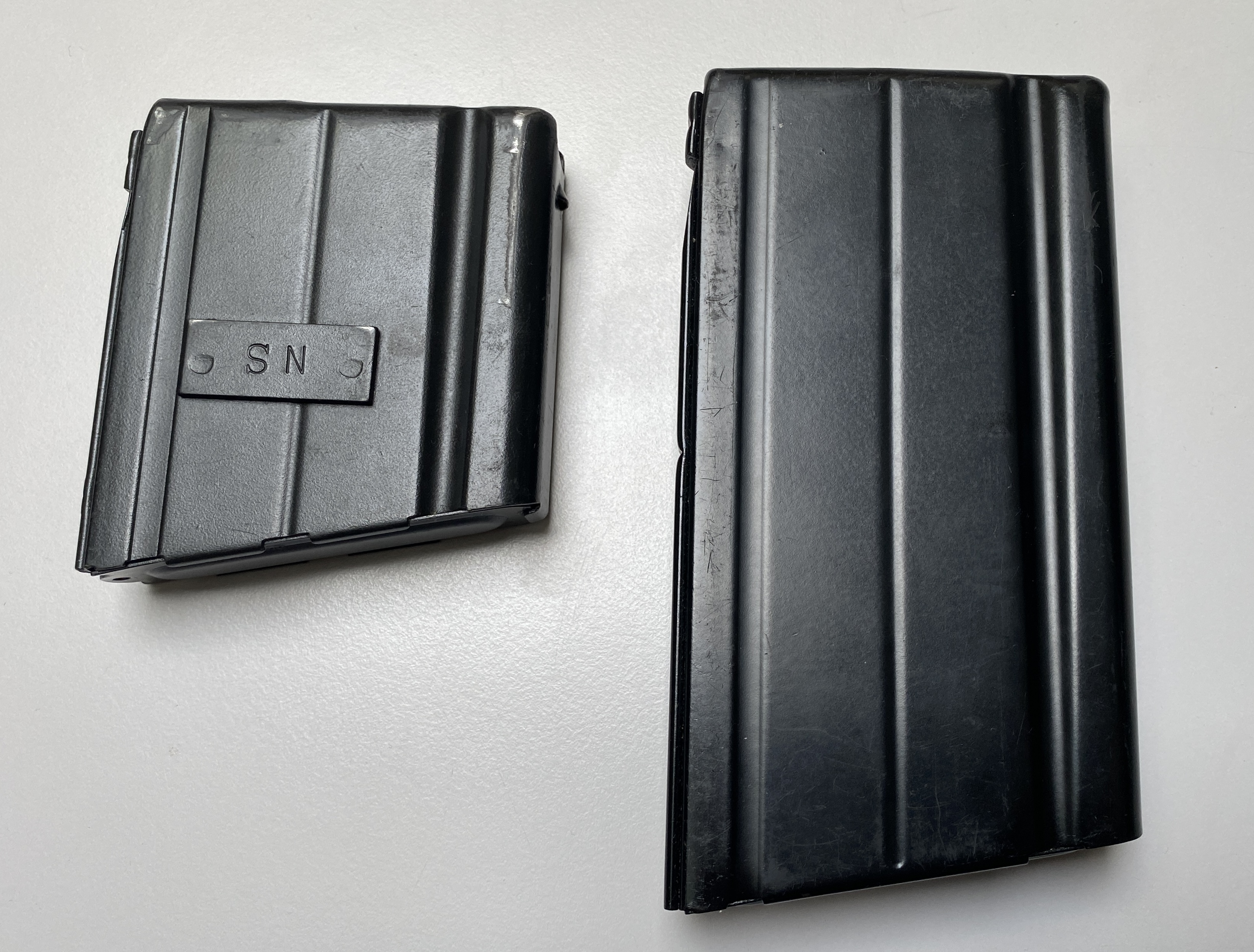
FN 30-11 10-round magazine (left) and FAL 20-round magazine. Both will fit the FN 30-11 rifle. Although strength of the internal spring of the FAL magazine is too strong for smooth action

FN distinguished their rifle with stability which was achieved by the heavy barrel and wide bipod. FN borrowed parts from other product lines but this should not be confused with assembling a rifle from a parts bin. Parts were specifically finished, altered, or made for the FN 30-11 sniper rifle.

The Model 30-11s were finished in FN's black enamel paint and originate from de model 30. Early bolts were left in the white, but this was changed within a few years with blued bolt handles, bolt sleeves, and cocking pieces. The custom walnut stock was made by FN.

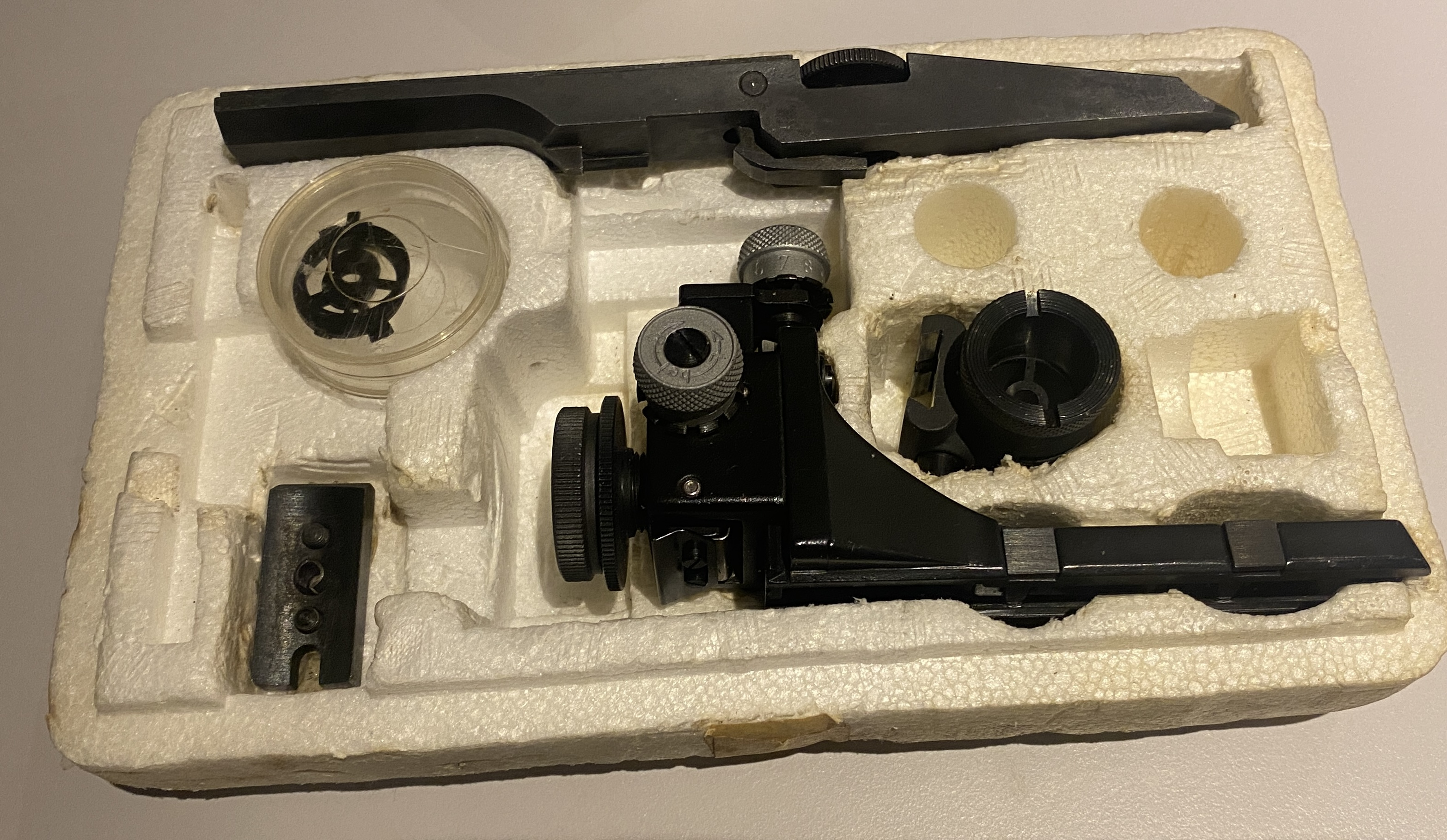
Original Anschutz Diopter for FN 30-11

FN purchased their accessories which were known for quality and accuracy. The UIT mounting rail for the bipod and sling were manufactured by Anschutz, a standardized size at the time (long before picatinny rails became standard). The removable front and rear sight came directly from Anschutz' competition line. These sights were meant for training the operators. This system has remained almost unchanged for decades and is still used in biathlon shooting.

== Users ==
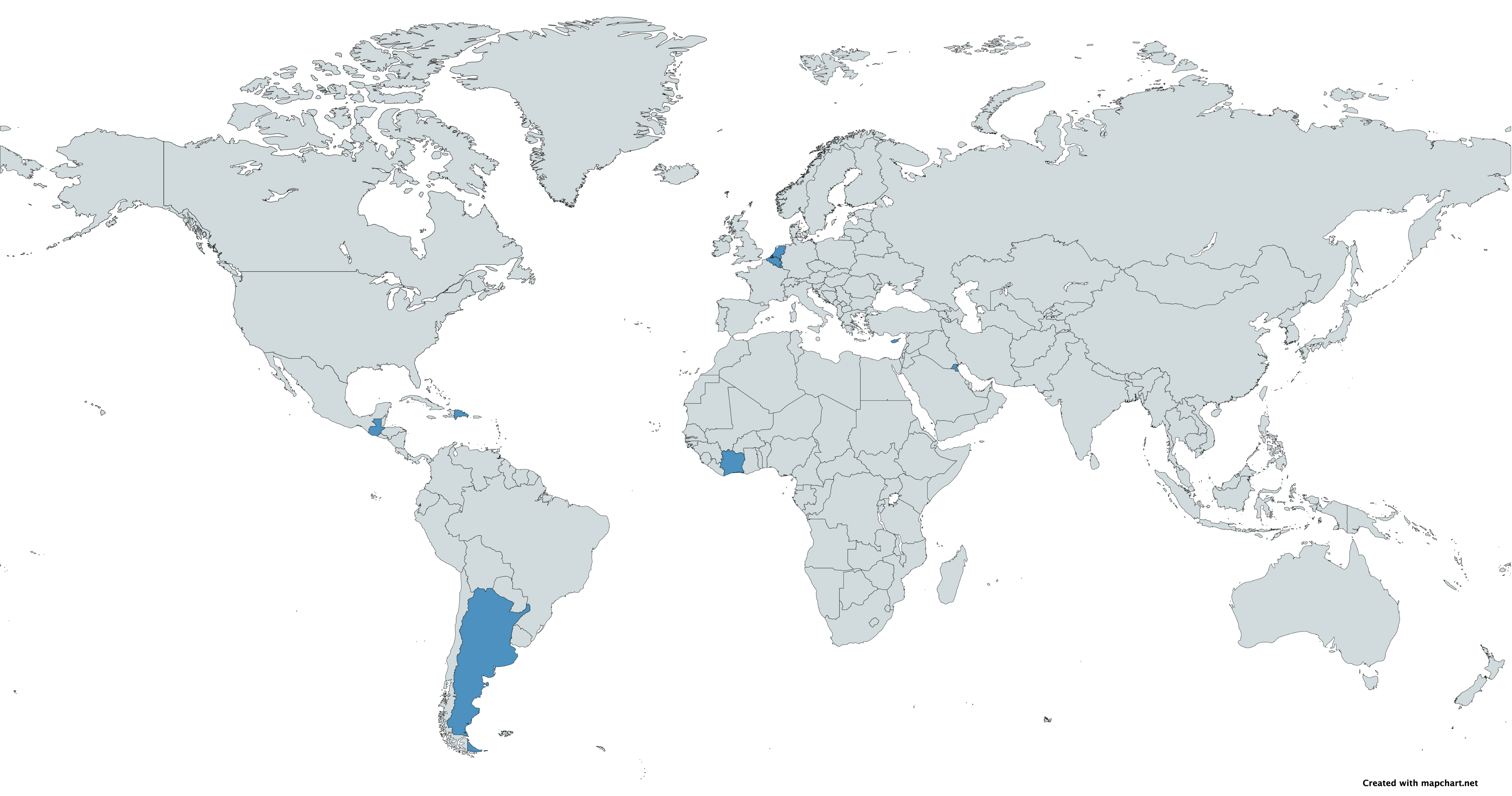
Map with FN Model 30-11 users in blue

- Argentina: Unknown quantity used by Argentine Air Force snipers with a 6X scope.
- Belgium: 64 rifles were purchased in three different configuration from 1975 through 1981.
- Cyprus: A small quantity was purchased directly from FN and / or Heckler & Koch, which sold Dutch surplus rifles.
- Dominican Republic: 25 rifles
- Guatemala: 25 rifles
- Ivory Coast: Unknown, a quantity of 170 rifles was reported in 1984.
- Kuwait: Unknown quantity
- Luxembourg: Less than 10 rifles ordered.
- Netherlands: 34 were ordered in 1983 and used with Swarovski 6X42mm optics. A second order consisted of 66 rifles, 65 were without scopes. Dutch officials were dissatisfied with the performance of the Swarovski scope they selected. There were further concerns about accuracy with standard 7.62mm ammo. This was quickly remedied by using FN Match ammunition. Instead of investing in other optics, Dutch officials opted to replace the FN 30–11 with the H&K PSGl after its introduction in 1985. The 34 FN 30-11 rifles that had been fielded were traded to H&K for the acquisition of the PSGl. The rifles from the second order were sold as surplus, 63 of those were still new in factory wrapping.
