= Small nucleolar RNA R30/Z108 =

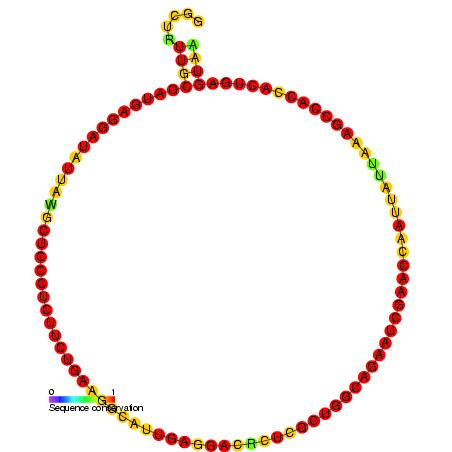
- Predicted secondary structure and sequence conservation of snoR30

Identifiers
- Symbol: snoR30
- Rfam: RF00046

Other data
- RNA type: Gene; snRNA; snoRNA; CD-box
- Domain: Eukaryota
- GO: GO:0006396 GO:0005730
- SO: SO:0000593
- PDB structures: PDBe

In molecular biology, Small nucleolar RNA R30/Z108 (snoR30) is a C/D box small nucleolar RNA that acts as a methylation guide for 18S ribosomal RNA in plants.
