= 3RR =

3RR may refer to:

- 3-ring release system, a parachute component used by sport skydivers
- 3rd Ring Road (Beijing), a road that encircles the center of Beijing, China
- Third-round reversal, a draft method used in some American fantasy football leagues
