= Venucia R30 =

Five-door hatchback car manufactured by Venucia

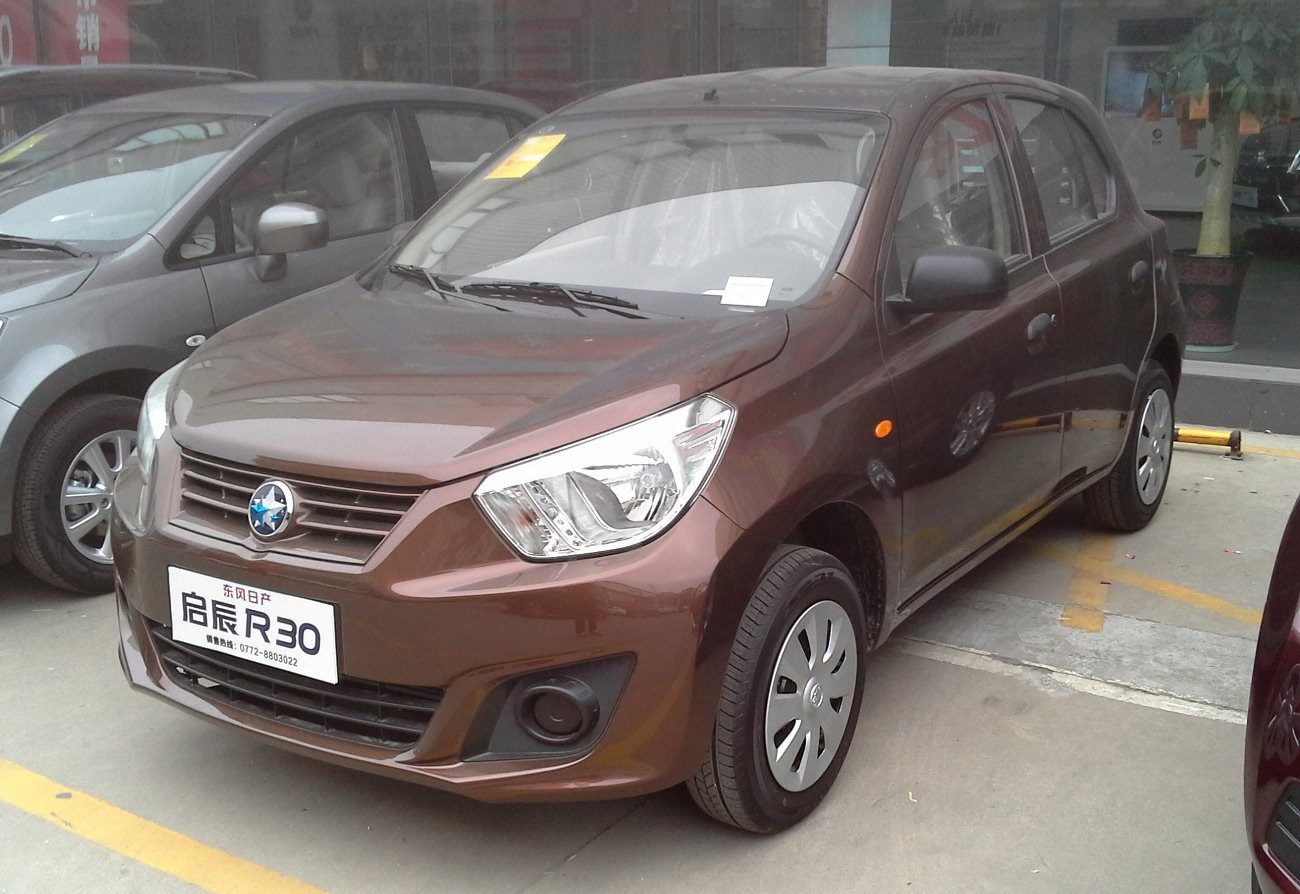

Overview
- Manufacturer: Venucia
- Also called: Dongfeng Skio ER30 (electric crossover version)
- Production: 2014–2017
- Model years: 2014–2017
- Assembly: Wuhan, China

Body and chassis
- Class: Subcompact car (B)
- Body style: 5-door hatchback
- Platform: Nissan V platform
- Related: Nissan March; Nissan Latio; Datsun Go

Powertrain
- Engine: 1.2 L HR12DE I3
- Transmission: 5-speed manual

Dimensions
- Wheelbase: 2,450 mm (96 in)
- Length: 3,775 mm (149 in)
- Width: 1,665 mm (65.6 in)
- Height: 1,530 mm (60 in)

The Venucia R30 is a supermini or subcompact five-door hatchback produced by the Chinese auto maker Venucia, a subsidiary of Dongfeng Motor Co., Ltd.

== Overview ==
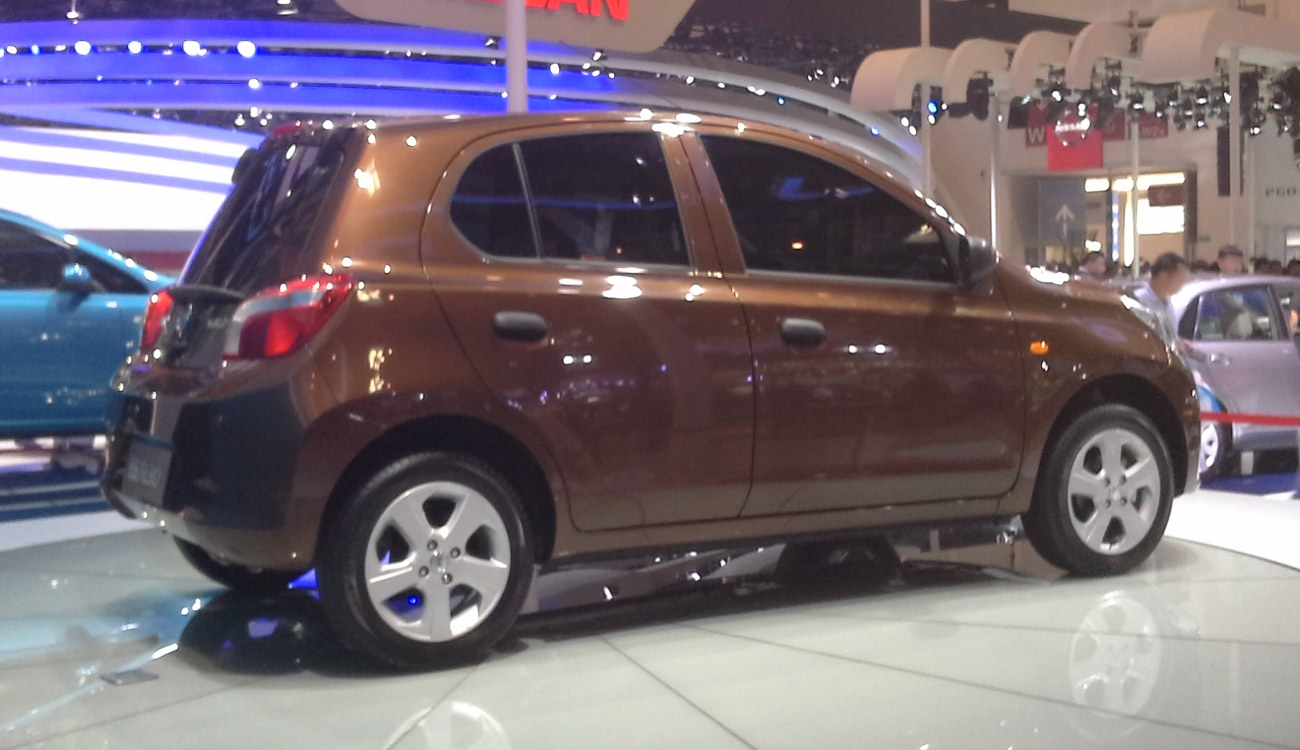
Venucia R30 rear

The pre-production of the Venucia R30 debuted during the 2014 Beijing Auto Show, and is based on the Nissan March that is manufactured in China by the Dongfeng-Nissan joint venture. The market launch for the production Venucia R30 was launched on the Chinese car market in July 2014 with prices starting from 39,900 yuan to 49,900 yuan.

== Dongfeng Skio ER30 ==
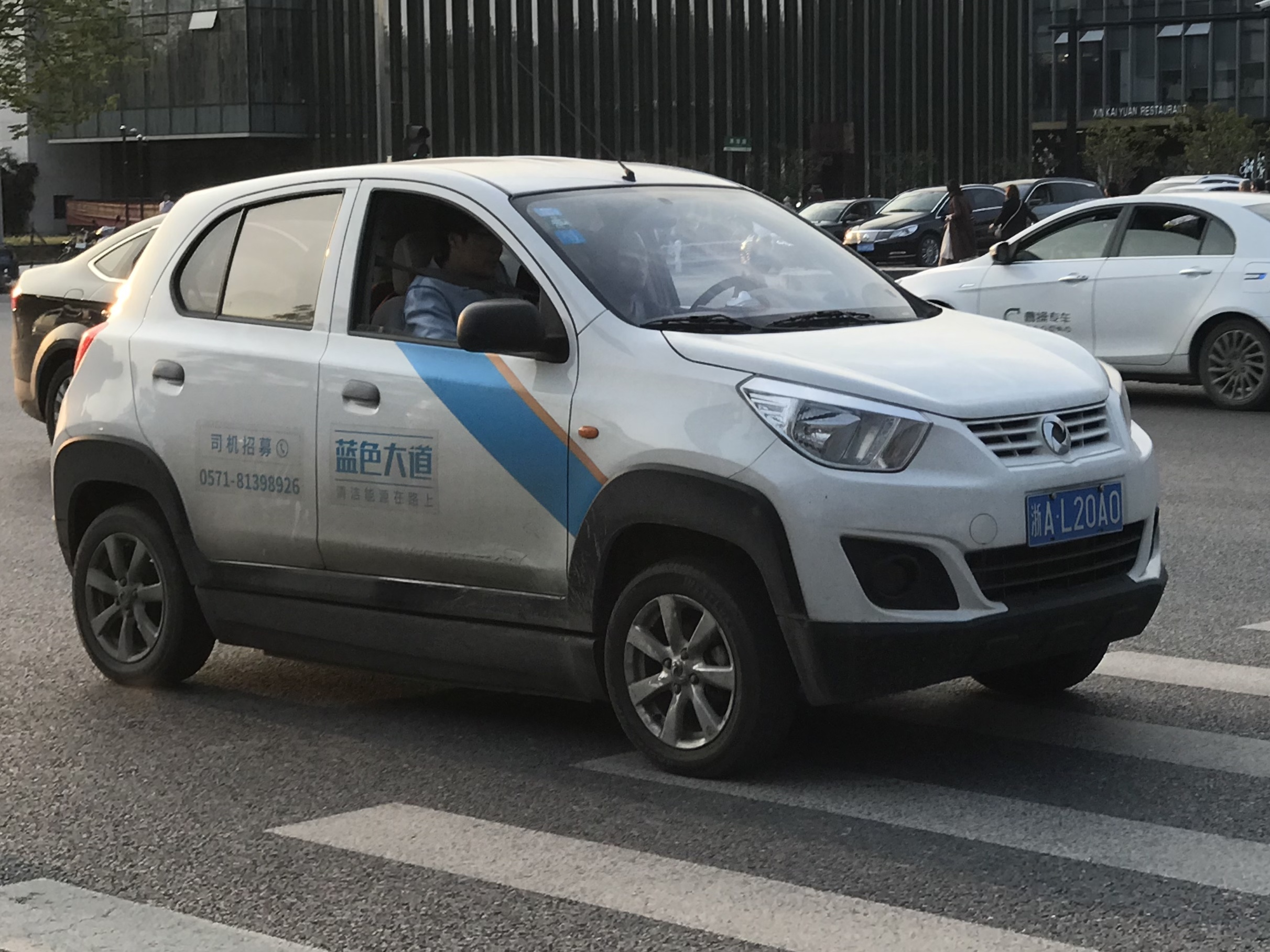

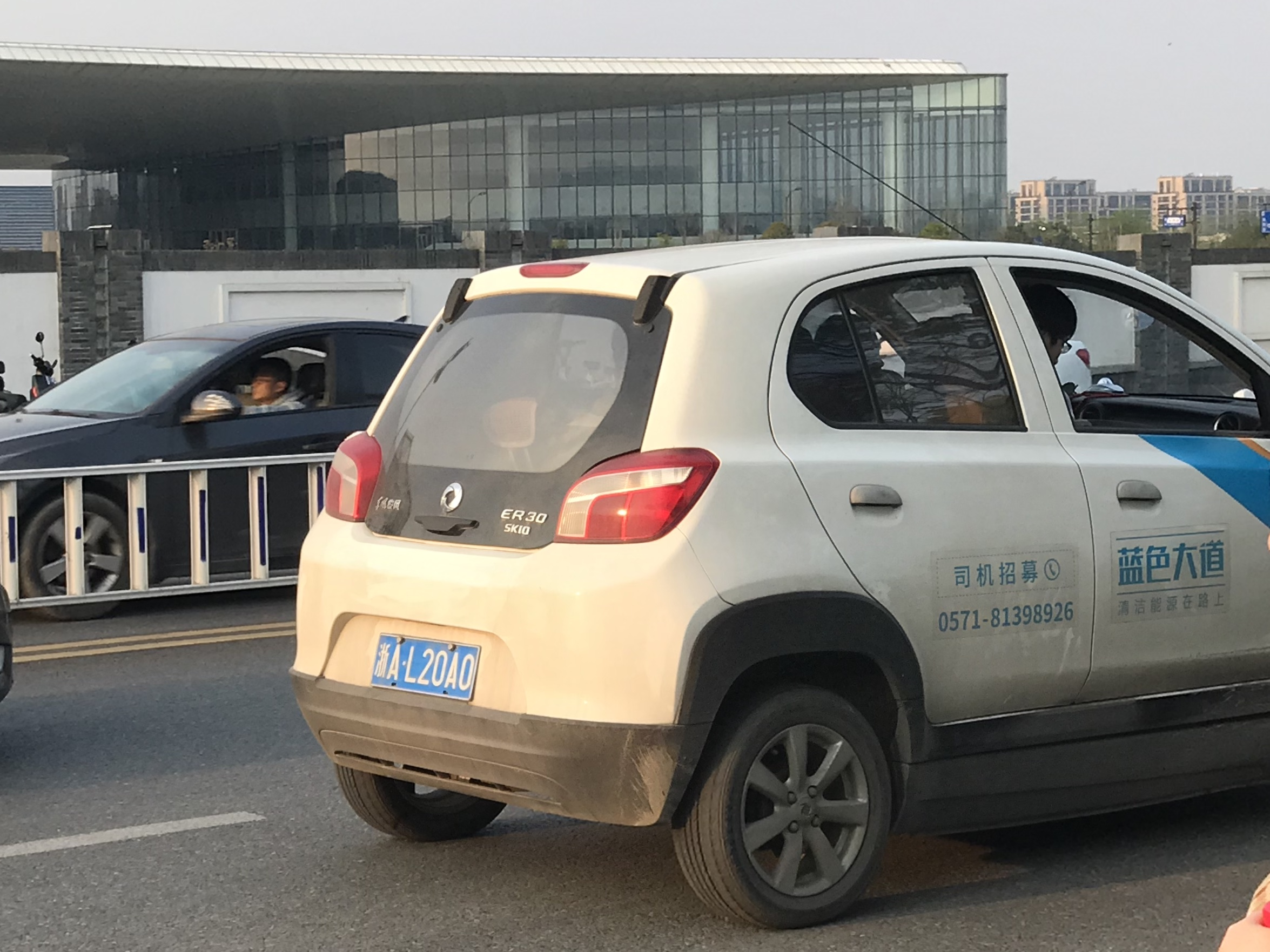
Dongfeng Skio ER30

The Dongfeng Skio ER30 is an electric subcompact five-door crossover produced by Dongfeng under the Dongfeng Skio sub-brand.
