= Residual-resistance ratio =

Ratio of the resistivity of a material

Residual-resistivity ratio (also known as Residual-resistance ratio or just RRR) is usually defined as the ratio of the resistivity of a material at room temperature and at 0 K. Of course, 0 K can never be reached in practice so some estimation is usually made. Since the RRR can vary quite strongly for a single material depending on the amount of impurities and other crystallographic defects, it serves as a rough index of the purity and overall quality of a sample. Since resistivity usually increases as defect prevalence increases, a large RRR is associated with a pure sample. RRR is also important for characterizing certain unusual low temperature states such as the Kondo effect and superconductivity. Note that since it is a unitless ratio there is no difference between a residual resistivity and residual-resistance ratio.

== Background ==
Usually at "warm" temperatures the resistivity of a metal varies linearly with temperature. That is, a plot of the resistivity as a function of temperature is a straight line. If this straight line were extrapolated all the way down to absolute zero, a theoretical RRR could be calculated

$$RRR = {\rho_{300K}\over \rho_{0K}}$$

In the simplest case of a good metal that is free of scattering mechanisms one would expect ρ_{(0K)} = 0, which would cause RRR to diverge. However, usually this is not the case because defects such as grain boundaries, impurities, etc. act as scattering sources that contribute a temperature independent ρ_{0} value. This shifts the intercept of the curve to a higher number, giving a smaller RRR.

In practice the resistivity of a given sample is measured down to as cold as possible, which on typical laboratory instruments is in the range of 2 K, though much lower is possible. By this point the linear resistive behavior is usually no longer applicable and by the low temperature ρ is taken as a good approximation to 0 K.

== Special Cases ==
- For superconducting materials, RRR is calculated differently because ρ is always exactly 0 below the critical temperature, T_{c}, which may be significantly above 0 K. In this case the RRR is calculated using the ρ from just above the superconducting transition temperature instead of at 0 K. For example, superconducting Niobium–titanium wires have an RRR defined as $\rho(293 K)/\rho(10 K)$.
- In the Kondo effect the resistivity begins to increase again with cooling at very low temperatures, and the value of RRR is useful for characterizing this state.

== Examples ==
- The RRR of copper wire is generally ~ 40–50 when used for telephone lines, etc.

== See also ==
- Wiedemann–Franz law

== Bibliography ==
- Ashcroft, Neil W.; Mermin, N. David (1976). Solid State Physics. Holt, Rinehart and Winston. ISBN 0-03-083993-9.
