= Armadillo (APC) =

Guatemalan APC

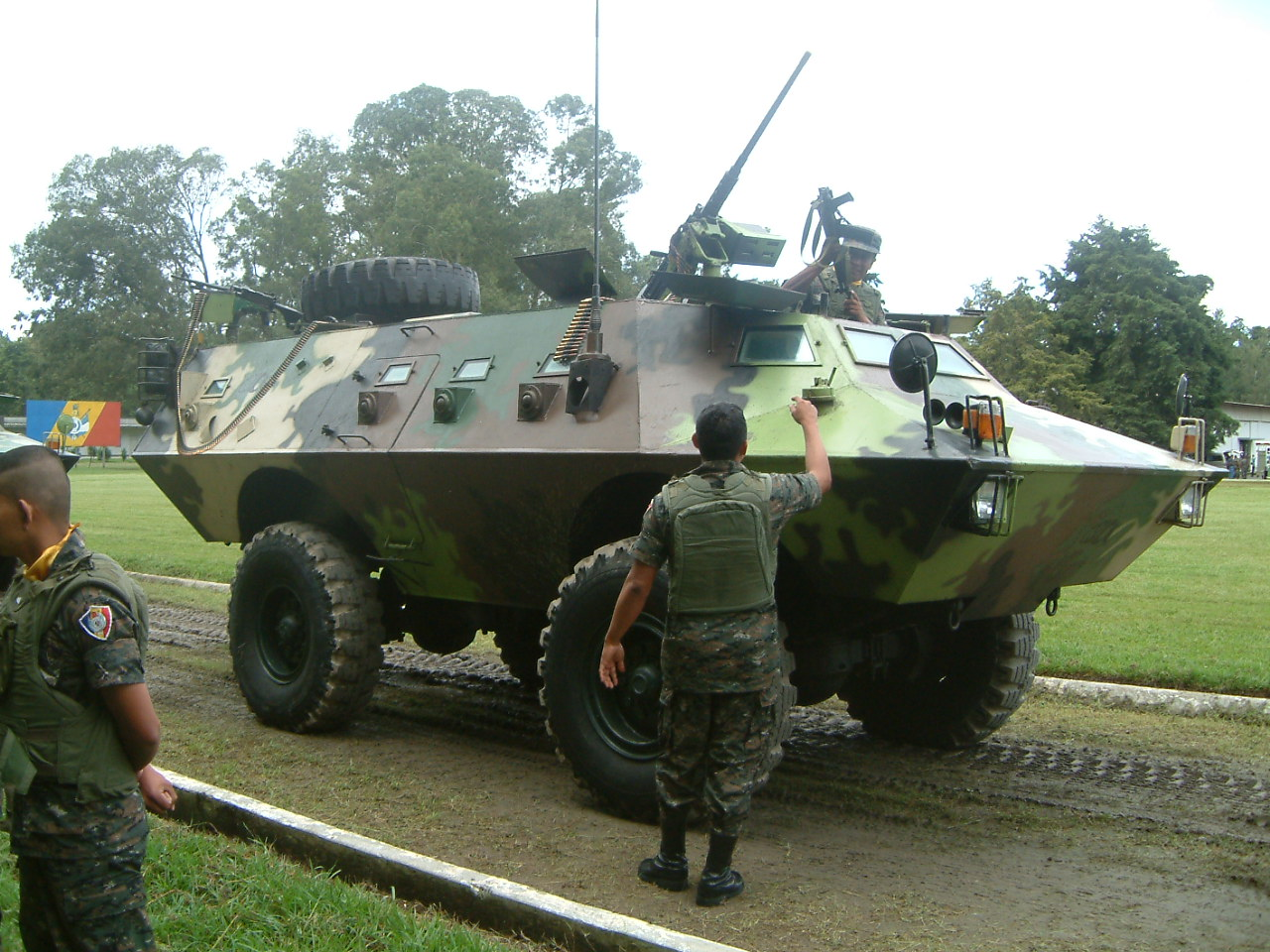
- Guatemalan Armadillo
- Type: Armoured personnel carrier
- Place of origin: Guatemala

Service history
- In service: 1981–present
- Used by: Guatemala
- Wars: Guatemalan Civil War

Production history
- Manufacturer: Servicio de Material de Guerra (SMG), Guatemala City
- Produced: 1981–present
- No. built: 100

Specifications
- Mass: 8.6 tonnes (8.5 long tons; 9.5 short tons)
- Length: 6.13m
- Width: 2.48m
- Height: 2.60m
- Crew: 2 (driver and commander) (+6 passengers)
- Main armament: Browning M2 HB 12.7mm, mounted on the head dome and belt fed from 100-round boxes.
- Secondary armament: 7.62 mm FN MAG
- Engine: diesel 260 hp (190 kW)
- Suspension: Semi-elliptical springs with shock absorbers.
- Operational range: 1200 km
- Maximum speed: 100 km/h (62 mph)

The Armadillo is a 4 wheeled armoured personnel carrier (APC) designed and solely operated by Guatemala. It was designed and built in 1981 in response to difficulties in obtaining American made military vehicles due to the ongoing civil war. It was inspired by the Cadillac Gage Commando.
