= 2R =

2R may refer to:

- A standard consumer print size for photographs. See Standard photographic print sizes
- 2R (group), a music group
- 2R hypothesis, a hypothesis in genomics and molecular evolution
- Yaesu VX-2R, an ultra-compact amateur radio transceiver
- Via Rail, IATA code

== See also ==
- R2 (disambiguation)
