= Jafarwala railway station =

Railway station in Pakistan

Coordinates: 29.859615°N 71.742478°E

General information
- Owner: Ministry of Railways

Other information
- Station code: JFW

History
- Former names: Great Indian Peninsula Railway
Location

Jafarwala railway station (Urdu: جعفر والا ریلوے اسٹیشن) is located in Pakistan.

== See also ==
- List of railway stations in Pakistan
- Pakistan Railways
