= R&R Films =

R&R Films or R & R Films may refer to:

- Associated R&R Films, first known as R&R Films, an Australian film company established in 1980 by Robert Stigwood and Rupert Murdoch, with its first and only project being the 1981 film Gallipoli
- R&R Films (later R&R Film), a British film company set up in 2010 by Robert Cavanah and Royd Tolkien
- R & R Films, an Australian film distribution company established in 2018 by Richard Becker and Robert Slaviero
