= R&R Colony Ponnathota =

- Smart village
- Nickname: Gsk
- Location in Andhra Pradesh, India
- Coordinates: 14°51′52″N 78°21′57″E
- Country: India
- State: Andhra Pradesh
- District: Cuddapah
- Established: 2013
- Founder: 9491989127
- Named for: R&R Colony

Government
  - Type: Telugu Desam Party
  - Rank: **** 4.5/5

Population (2019)
  - Total: 500

Languages
  - Official: Telugu
- Time zone: UTC+5:30 (IST)
- PIN: 516431
- Website: https://gsanthoshkumar.business.site/

R&R Colony Ponnathota is a smart village located in Jammalamadugu Mandal, Kadapa district, Andhra Pradesh, India. It falls under the constituency of Jammalamadugu and is situated along the bank of the Penna River. The Mylavaram dam, located just 3 km away, supplies drinking water to the area. R&R Colony Ponnathota is also known for its residents who create silk sarees with their own hands.

In the village, people of all religions live together harmoniously. There are temples such as Sri Chodeswari, Ramalayam, and Pedhamma Temple, etc. where festivals are celebrated grandly by all community members. A major event is the "Jyothi Uthsavas" held during Ugadi and Ganesh Chaturthi is also celebrated with great enthusiasm. In addition to religious temples, there are five national temples. The elementary school features well-constructed buildings and a playground.

== Demographics ==
As of 2001 Indian census, R&R Colony Ponnathota had a population of 500. Males constitute 51% of the population and females 49%. R&R Colony Ponnathota has an average literacy rate of 54%, lower than the national average of 59.5%; male literacy is 67% and female literacy is 40%. In R&R Colony Ponnathota, 12% of the population is under 6 years of age.
