= Bravia Chaimite =

Portuguese armoured vehicle

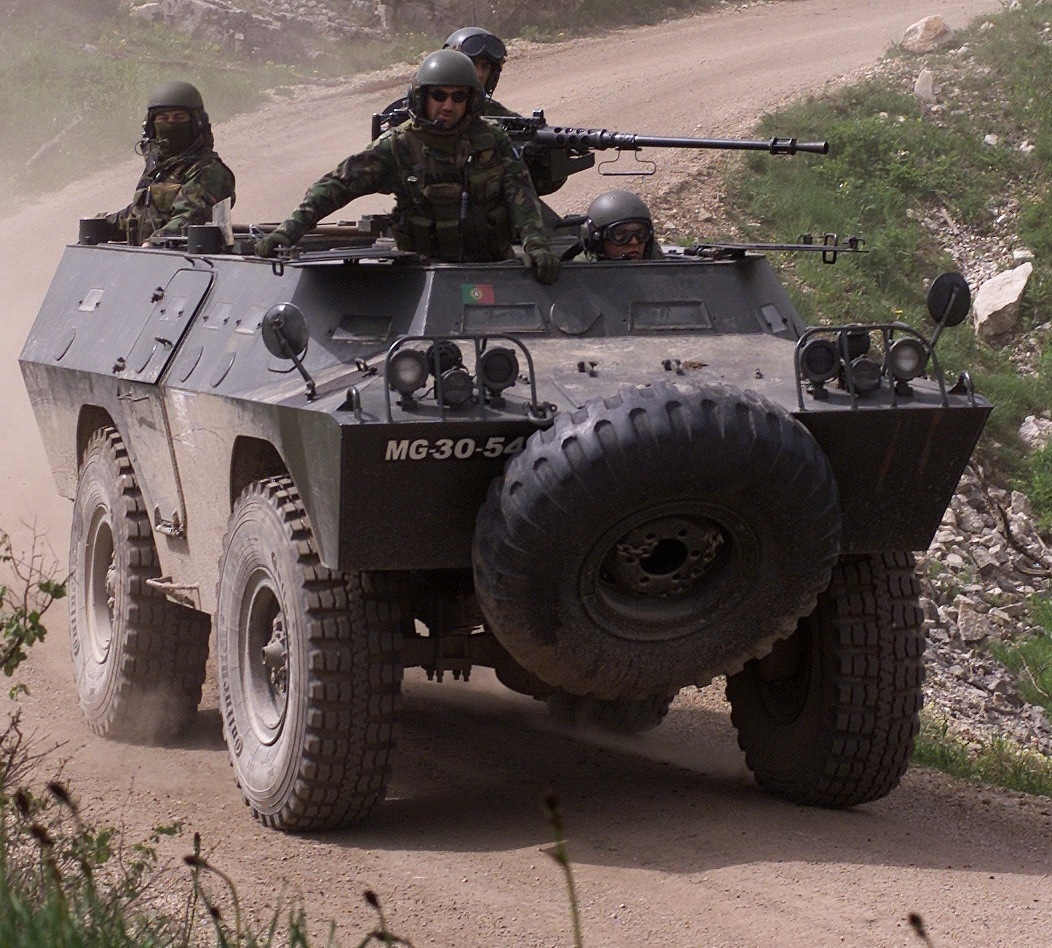
- Portuguese Chaimite V200 during Exercise Iberian Resolve, 2002.
- Type: Armoured personnel carrier
- Place of origin: Portugal

Service history
- In service: 1967–present
- Used by: See Operators
- Wars: Portuguese Colonial War; Carnation Revolution; Lebanese Civil War; 1982 Lebanon War; Moro conflict Internal conflict in Peru; 2006 Lebanon War; 2007 Lebanon conflict 2008 conflict in Lebanon; Libyan Civil War (2011–present)

Production history
- Manufacturer: Bravia
- No. built: 600
- Variants: See Variants

Specifications
- Mass: 6,800 to 8,500 kg
- Length: 5.6 m
- Width: 2.26 m
- Height: 2.39 m
- Crew: 1+10
- Armor: up to 7.62 mm
- Main armament: depend of variant
- Secondary armament: depend of variant
- Engine: diesel engine 155 hp (115 kW) at 3300 rpm
- Payload capacity: 804 kg
- Transmission: automatic gearbox
- Operational range: 804 km
- Maximum speed: 99 km/h (62 mph); 4.8 km/h on water
- Steering system: rack & pinion non assisted

The Bravia Chaimite is an armoured vehicle with all wheel drive axles built by the Portuguese company Bravia and used by the Portuguese Army in the Portuguese colonial wars in Angola, Mozambique and Portuguese Guinea, from 1967 to 1974 when it ended. The Chaimite was originally an unlicensed derivative of the Cadillac Gage Commando assembled and later produced in Portugal, with a number of improvements and technical modifications.

There were two versions of the Chaimite, the VBTP V-200 and the VBPM V-600. The VBTP (Viatura Blindada de Transporte de Pessoal, Armoured Personnel Transport Vehicle), had an 11-man capacity and was armed with one .50 Browning heavy machine-gun, while the VBPM, (Viatura Blindada Porta-morteiro, Armoured Mortar Carrier Vehicle), had only a 4-man capacity and was armed with one Browning .30 heavy machine-gun and one 81 mm mortar. These vehicles had diesel engines with 155 hp (115 kW) at 3300 rpm with automatic gear capable of taking on speeds to a maximum of 99 km/h (62 mph). The armour of this APC was capable of defeating rounds up to 7.62 mm NATO.

The Chaimite was gradually phased out of Portuguese Army service since 2008 and replaced by the Austrian Pandur II 8x8 APC, though the last operational Chaimite armoured cars were only retired in 2016.

The 6 mortar carrier vehicles operated by the 6th Cavalry Regiment in Braga are the last Chaimite armored vehicles in service with the Portuguese Army. They were in service as of 2019.

== History ==
Designed in the mid 1960s for the Portuguese Army, in its original incarnation the Chaimite resembled a modified Cadillac Gage Commando, leading to speculation that Bravia had produced it under license from the United States. A hearing held before the United States House of Representatives in 1977 verified that no such license had been granted, and that two former Cadillac Gage employees had been prosecuted for illegally transferring the technical knowledge for the Commando design to Bravia.

The first prototype Chaimite appeared in 1966, and was designed primarily for direct fire support, with a large turret ring and braced chassis to carry a 90mm low-pressure cannon. In 1968 or 1969 the prototype was sent to Portuguese Guinea for combat trials, where it performed well but was later destroyed by African Party for the Independence of Guinea and Cape Verde (PAIGC) insurgents with an RPG-2 or RPG-7. The base Chaimite subsequently spawned several variants designed for internal security, anti-tank purposes, and medical evacuation. By the time production ceased, over 600 had been manufactured for the Portuguese Army and export.

== Variants ==
- V-200: armoured personnel carrier
- V-200 Armada 90: special variant for the Portuguese Marines of the V-200 armed with a multiple 90 mm rocket launcher
- V-300: light fire support armed with FN Minimi, FN MAG or 20 mm gun.
- V-400: heavy fire support with 90mm or 75mm low-pressure gun.
- V-500: communications and command vehicle.
- V-600: mortar carrier with 81mm mm or 120 mm mortars
- V-700: anti-tank with Swingfire or HOT missile launcher
- V-800: ambulance
- V-900: armoured recovery vehicle
- V-1000: anti-riot with water cannon

== Combat history ==
=== Africa ===
Libya placed an order of 60 V-200 Chaimite armored cars in June 1976, though only 13 or 16 were delivered. The Libyan government cancelled the order upon hearing that the Portuguese government had decided that same year to establish diplomatic relations with Israel, an act that infuriated President Muammar Gaddafi who immediately severed the diplomatic and commercial ties with Portugal in protest, which left the remaining 25 vehicles still in production at the assembly line of the Bravia VM plant in Samora Correia. The batch of V-200 Chaimite armored cars that was shipped to Libya prior to the break-up of diplomatic relations was assigned to the Presidential Guard, with one of the vehicles being later sent to Lebanon; the other remaining vehicles were kept in service until the overthrow of the Gaddafi Regime in October 2011. Their present status is unknown, though some unconfirmed reports claim that they have been used in combat on the ongoing Libyan Civil War.

=== Asia ===
Twenty V-200 Chaimite armored cars were acquired in 1973 by the government of the Philippines for its Philippine Constabulary units fighting the Muslim separatist guerrillas in Mindanao during the Moro conflict, but only 13 were actually delivered before the order was cancelled by the Philippine authorities.

=== Middle East ===
Lebanon was the first Middle Eastern country to place a request in December 1972 of thirty V-200 Chaimite armored cars for its Internal Security Forces (ISF), though only twenty-one vehicles had been delivered by April 1975, when occurred the outbreak of the Lebanese Civil War (1975–1990), a conflict in which they saw considerable action. During the Battle of the Hotels in October 1975, the ISF used their own V-200 armored cars alongside loaned M113 and Panhard M3 VTT armored personnel carriers (APCs) by the Lebanese Army in a successful operation to evacuate more than 200 people – including the staff and residents, most of them tourists – trapped in the Holiday Inn and adjoining hotels located at the Minet el-Hosn hotel district of downtown Beirut.

When the ISF collapsed in January 1976, the Christian Tigers Militia and Guardians of the Cedars (GoC) militia were able to seize an unspecified number of V-200 armored cars, which the GoC later employed against the Syrian Army at Houche el-Oumara during the Battle of Zahleh on April–June 1981. The vehicles operated by the Tigers Militia were reportedly employed in the defense of the Christian-controlled east Beirut quarters during the Hundred Days' War in February–April 1978, but after the forcible disbandment of the militia in October 1980 they were eventually returned to ISF ownership.

The Lebanese ISF Command was so impressed by the performance of its V-200 Chaimite armored cars in the field – notably, the Lebanese crews praised the ability of their vehicles' armored hull to withstand small-arms fire, landmine blasts and even RPG-7 anti-tank rounds in an urban combat environment – that they requested a further nine or 10 vehicles in 1980, which were delivered by 1982. Later in August 1990, the Lebanese showed interest in acquiring an additional thirty V-200 armored cars along with 15 Bravia Commando MK III patrol cars for the ISF, but those plans were eventually scrapped upon the conclusion of the civil war in October that same year.

The Palestine Liberation Organization (PLO) guerrilla factions operating in Lebanon received a single vehicle from Libya in 1981, which was later captured in the Beqaa Valley by the Israel Defense Forces (IDF) during the 1982 Lebanon War.

=== Latin America ===
Peru was the first foreign customer of the Chaimite, purchasing in 1970 twenty V-200 armored cars for its Marine corps, which were delivered in 1971–1973.

== Operators ==
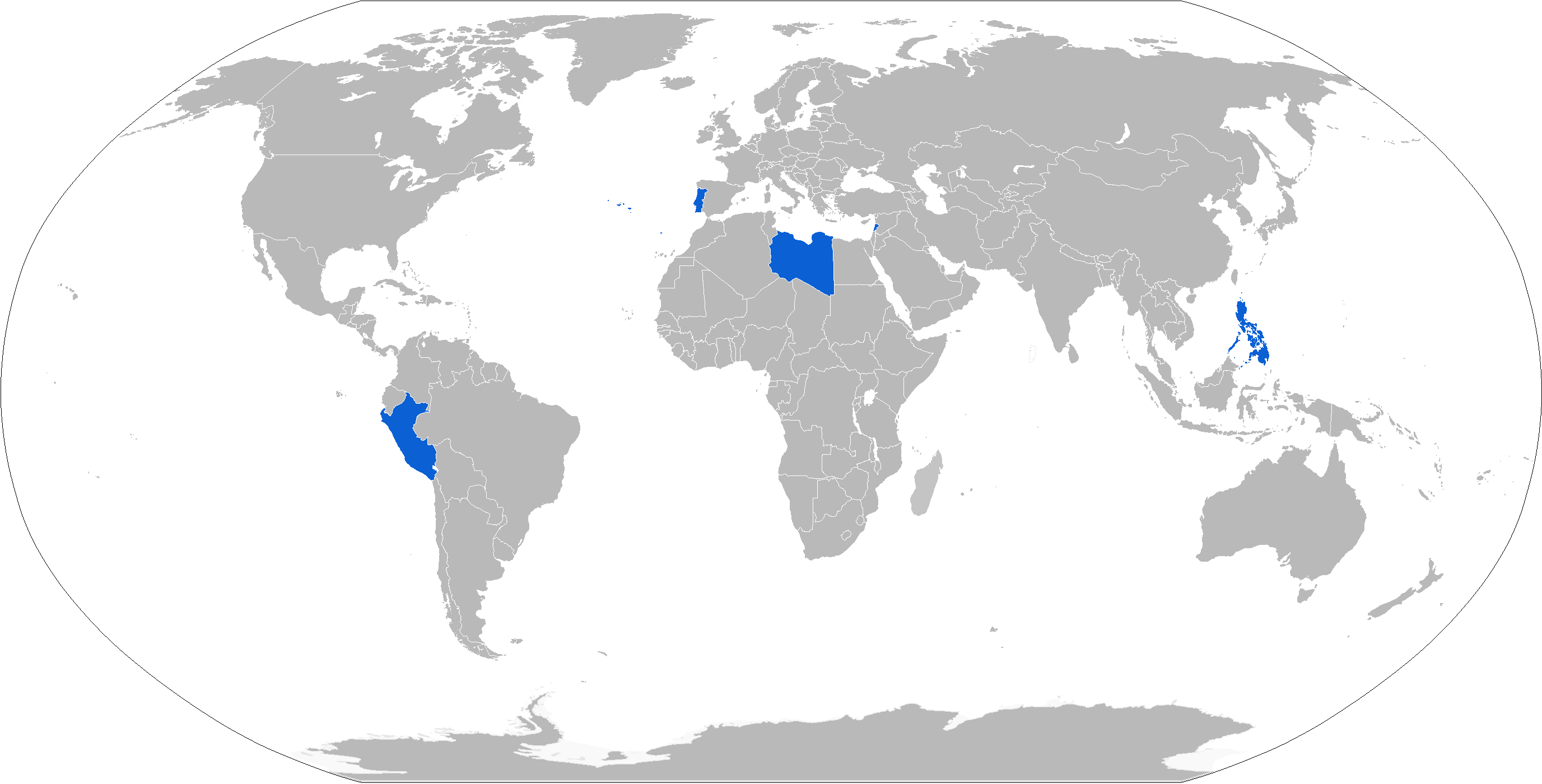
Map of Bravia Chaimite operators in blue

=== Current operators ===
- Lebanon: 30
- Libya: 16
- Peru: 20
- Portugal – 84 units were operated by the Portuguese Army and 4 operated by the Portuguese Marine Corps; replaced in 2009 by 188 Pandur II. 6 mortar carrier vehicles remained in service as of 2019.

=== Former operators ===
- Guardians of the Cedars – some captured from the Internal Security Forces in 1976;
- Tigers Militia – some captured from the Internal Security Forces in 1976 and returned in 1980;
- Palestine: Palestine Liberation Organization – 1 supplied by Libya in 1981;
- Philippines: Philippine National Police operated 20 units ordered only 13 units delivered.

=== Evaluation-only operators ===
- Iran;
- Malaysia: one V-400 prototype tested in July 1973;
- Myanmar;
- Venezuela.

== Vehicles on display ==
=== Philippines ===
- A Philippine National Police Bravia Chaimite APC inherited from the Philippine Constabulary is on outdoor static display at Fort Sto Domingo Sta Rosa, Laguna, Luzon, Philippine.
- V-200 Bravia Chaimite in Integrated National Police colors is on static display at the Philippine National Police Museum, Camp General Rafael T. Crame in Quezon City, Philippines.

=== Portugal ===
- Bravia Chaimite armoured vehicle in the exposition in the Military Museum of Elvas, Portugal
- V-200 Bravia Chaimite armoured vehicle in the exposition in Museu do Combatente, Portugal.
- A Bravia Chaimite is part of the Monument to the 25th of April, 1974 in Póvoa de Varzim, Portugal, since June 16, 2019.

== In popular culture ==
The Chaimite made some major film appearances, notably in the Danish 1993 historical drama film The House of the Spirits, portraying Chilean Army APCs in action during the September 1973 Chilean coup d'état and in the Spanish-American 2002 crime thriller film The Dancer Upstairs, in the colours of an undisclosed Latin American Army. It was also featured in the 2000 historical drama film April Captains, set in during the Portuguese Carnation Revolution of April 1974.

== See also ==
- Battle of the Hotels
- Bravia Commando
- Cadillac Gage Commando
- List of weapons of the Portuguese Colonial War
- List of weapons of the Lebanese Civil War
