= Junior Forest Wardens =

Canadian volunteer-led organization

The Official Crest of the Junior Forest Wardens

The Junior Forest Wardens (JFW) is a Canadian volunteer-led organization focused on developing a wild lands conservation ethic in youth.

JFW clubs have operated at various times across Canada. As of 2019, clubs are active in British Columbia, Alberta, Saskatchewan, and Newfoundland and Labrador.

== History ==
The organization is almost a 100 years old. It began in the 1920s, when a group of boys reported a forest fire to a local forest ranger in the province of British Columbia. The magazine Forest and Outdoors, which was published by the Canadian Forestry Association (CFA), devoted a section to the activities, interests, and education of children. When a story was published in 1929 about how two boys discovered a small forest fire on Snug Cove on Bowen Island in British Columbia and assisted a Ranger in putting it out, an interest in this type of assistance grew. In the publicity that followed this incident, boys across the province wrote to find out what they could do to help in similar ways. As a result of this, Charles Wilkinson, a member of the CFA in the region, formed the Junior Fire Warden program as a vehicle for teaching boys about forest protection.

By 1930, more than 300 boys from across British Columbia had joined. In 1931, a tree was planted in Stanley Park, Vancouver, with soil collected by Wardens from across the province. The tree still stands today, as a symbol of the movement.

In 1932, the name of the organization was changed to the name it bears today. The first Chief Warden was appointed by Vancouver Mayor W.H. Malkin in a ceremony in Vancouver at the time of the renaming. The program already included the earning of bronze badges in these early days.

In 1934, the "red shirt" uniform still worn by members today was created. In addition, the boys and their organizers spontaneously formed into regional "clubs", beginning in the Vancouver area and spreading across the province.

By 1942, Charles Wilkinson offered the job of Chief Warden to Bill Myring, who toured the province to lecture on conservation and help consolidate the organizing of local JFW clubs.

Girls also became interested in wildfire prevention and forest conservation .A sister organization for girls was organized in 1944 under the name "Girl Forest Guards" by Margaret Myring, the wife of Bill Myring. About 500 girls joined a newly formed organization. The two organizations were distinct until they were merged under the common banner of the Junior Forest Wardens in 1974.

In 1961, the activities of the Junior Forest Wardens in the province of British Columbia came to the attention of the Honorable Norman Willmore, a cabinet minister in the government for the province of Alberta. Impressed by the quality and range of their activities, Willmore sought to create an Alberta Charter for the Junior Forest Wardens, which was officially inaugurated in February 1962. Bill Myring, then Chief Warden of British Columbia, was then appointed Chief Warden of Canada, a position he retained until his death in 1989. Ken Kelsey held this position from 1990 to 2000, followed by Dave Cullen.

== Junior Forest Wardens in Alberta ==
From 1961 until 2007 the Junior Forest Warden program was administered by provincial government. A central office in Hinton, operating through a network of Alberta Forest Service Ranger Stations, first carried out the administration of the program throughout the province. The office was eventually moved to Edmonton, Alberta, the seat of the provincial government in Alberta.

The title Chief Warden, which was a volunteer position in British Columbia, was used as a designation for the most senior bureaucrat with the Alberta Public Service who held primary responsibility for delivering the program in the province. The first Chief Warden in Alberta was Terry Whitely (1960–1967). Terry, a British expatriate who assumed the role in 1960 moved him and his family from Smith, Alberta where he was Chief Warden to Hinton, Alberta. Other Chief Wardens in Alberta have been: George Brewster (1967–1979), Bill Bresnahan (1980–1995), Jim Skrenek (1995–1996), Bob Young (1996). During Bob Young's tenure, the Chief Warden became a separate volunteer position from the provincial coordinator. The position is awarded to a volunteer who is elected by the provincial association. Ernst Klaszus was the first volunteer to hold position of Alberta's Chief Warden from 1998 to 2007. Upon his retirement, he was given the title Chief Warden Emeritus and Terry Garrett was appointed Chief Warden in April 2007. In 2005, the position of Assistant Chief Warden was created. The first Assistant Chief Warden was Terry Garrett, followed by Brian McBride and currently Cody Howitt.

Since 2007, the Junior Forest Warden program in Alberta has been maintained by the Alberta Junior Forest Wardens Association (AJFWA), an independent volunteer organisation. The AJFWA provides administration and oversight for all clubs in Canada.

== Program overview ==
According to a 2014 brochure, "Junior Forest Wardens is an exciting and educational opportunity for young people and their families to have fun, develop skills, and get educated in the many diverse aspects of our natural environment." The Junior Forest Wardens have built their programs foundation using the four components of forestry, ecology, outdoor skills and leadership.

Young people between the ages of 6–18 can join a local club, and enjoy age specific programming in one of the four age classes: Pathfinders – Ages 6–8, Trailblazers – Ages 9–11, Adventurers – Ages 12–14, and Challengers – Ages 15–17.

One of the key characteristics of the program is that parents are encouraged to participate with their children, in any aspect of the club program; from providing their expertise in a leadership or resource role, parent supervision, to learning right alongside of their kids. Leadership development for parents is a key component of the program as the majority of the program is provided through their volunteer efforts.

Junior Forest Wardens is an outdoor oriented program, with an emphasis on the experience. The program is committed to providing opportunities to get outdoors: camping, backpacking, canoeing, mountaineering, tree planting and more! And to prepare for adventures like these, education is offered and promoted in wilderness skills development, first aid, trip planning and survival. To provide a greater appreciation of the natural resources while outdoors, Wardens are taught about tree, plant and animal identification, soil types, weather and water, resource management, threats to the environment and our resources and the list goes on...

Clubs typically meet once per week to provide evening programming, with an outdoor event (camp-out or field trip) once per month. This schedule is augmented by offerings through the District, Regional and Provincial/National councils that give the opportunity to share the experience with a larger audience, networking with other clubs, and enhancing the experience.

The JFW Pledge is "As one who believes in the aims of the Junior Forest Wardens, I pledge myself and my services to the appreciation and responsible use of our forests, wildlife, and natural heritage." The original pledge was composed in the 1940s in order to answer the question of how to put the Junior Forest Warden code into practice day‑by‑day. In 1987 the current pledge was developed. It includes a promise to protect and conserve the environment and to help others to be more aware.

Other organizational facts include:

- The JFW motto is "Keep our Forests Green"
- The JFW watchword is "Watch and Warn"
- The JFW Code, based on the writings of John Ruskin, is "We have been given the earth for our life. It is a great entail. It belongs as much to those who come after us as to us, and we have no right by anything we do, or neglect to do, to involve them in unnecessary penalties or to deprive them of benefits which are theirs by right."
- The "3 Rs" of the Junior Forest Wardens are: "Responsibility to yourself"; "Responsibility to others"; and "Responsibility to the environment".

== Current organization ==
The organization continues to this day, and has chapters all across the country. Many of today's employees in the forestry service in Canada, whether government or industry, received their first training in the Junior Forest Warden program. Although there is a dearth of documented material describing the history of the organization, participation is widely cited and respected within Canadian circles. Since 1985, the program has been expanded to provide additional opportunities for training in Forestry, Ecology, Leadership and Outdoor Skills.

== Club names and locations ==
JFW clubs have operated at various times across Canada. Clubs can be formed in any community in Canada, with a minimum involvement of three families. Clubs are encouraged to give themselves a distinctive name, such as a favourite animal or a local connotation.

As of 2019, clubs are active in British Columbia, Alberta, Saskatchewan, and Newfoundland and Labrador.

Calgary Region

- Airdrie Wolves
- Airdrie Hawks
- Bragg Creek Bald Eagles
- Calgary Sarcee
- Calgary Eagles
- Calgary Bobcats
- Calgary Black Bears
- Medicine Hat Warriors

David Thompson Region

- Red Deer Woodchucks
- Rocky Mountain House Rams
- Stettler Swift Foxes
- Innisfail Falcons

Northeast Region

- Cold Lake Chipmunks
- Westlock Whitetails
- Lac La Biche Boreal Explorers

Northwest Region

- Grande Prairie Dinosaurs
- Bezanson Brown Bears
- Peace River Wolverines
- Slave Lake
- Smoky River Bears Falher

Yellowhead Region

- Edmonton Windwalkers
- Edmonton Water Striders
- Edmonton Mallards
- Edson Explorers
- Glory Hills Grey Wolves Stony Plain
- Keephills Whitewhales
- St. Albert Sturgeons
- Spruce Grove Grizzlies
- Tofield Snow Geese
- Whitecourt Whiskey Jacks

Saskatchewan

- Meadowlake Woodlanders

British Columbia

- Fort St John Aurora Borealis
- Powell River Cranberry Lake
- Victoria Sea Lions
- Comox Valley Cormorants

Newfoundland

- Wild Wanderers
- St. John's East Giant Squid
