= RR =

RR, Rr or rr may refer to:

== Arts and media ==
- RR (film), a 2007 experimental film by James Benning
- Red Ribbon Army, a fictional army in the Dragon Ball series
- Reference Reviews, a journal on reference works
- Ruff Ryders Entertainment, a record label and East Coast rap collective
- Fury from the Deep (production code: RR), a 1968 Doctor Who serial
- RR (EP), a 2023 collaborative EP by Rosalía and Rauw Alejandro
- RR, prefix for models of Jackson Rhoads electric guitars commissioned by guitarist Randy Rhoads

== Businesses and organizations ==
- Rajasthan Royals, an Indian Premier League franchise
- Ranchi Rhinos, a defunct Hockey India League franchise
- Rashtriya Rifles, an Indian counter-insurgency force
- Rational Recovery, an addiction recovery program
- Rekords Rekords, an American record label
- Rhodesia Regiment, a Rhodesian Army unit
- Richard Rohac, an Austrian art metal firm
- Rolls-Royce Holdings (LSE code and logo)
  - Rolls-Royce, several companies
- Royal Air Force (IATA airline designator RR)
- Ruff Ryders Entertainment, a record label and East Coast rap collective

== Language ==
- rr (digraph)
- Revised Romanization of Korean, the official Korean language romanization system in South Korea

== Science and technology ==
=== Biology and medicine ===
- RR, an Rh factor phenotype
- "RR", a blood pressure measurement taken with a sphygmomanometer invented by Scipione Riva-Rocci
- RR interval (R wave to R wave interval), the inverse of heart rate
- Risk ratio, or relative risk, in statistics and epidemiology
- Respiratory rate, a vital sign
- Roundup Ready, a Monsanto line of genetically modified crop seeds

=== Computing ===
- Resource record, in the Domain Name System
- Round-robin scheduling, an algorithm for coordinating processes in an operating system
- Route reflector, a Border Gateway Protocol configuration
- rr (debugging), a record and replay debugger for userspace Linux programs
- Resurrection Remix OS, a custom Android ROM created by Altan KRK and Varun Date

=== Other uses in science and technology ===
- ITU Radio Regulations
- Rapid Refresh (weather prediction), a short-range numerical weather prediction model
- Rear-engine, rear-wheel-drive layout, in automotive design
- Recoilless rifle

== Sports ==
- Rajasthan Royals, an Indian Premier League franchise
- Ranchi Rhinos, a defunct Hockey India League franchise
- Richmond Raceway, a motorsports racetrack in Richmond, Virginia
- Run rate, an average number of runs a batsman (or the batting side) scores in an over of 6 balls in cricket

== Transportation ==
=== Transport operators and services ===
- RR, a predecessor of the R (New York City Subway service)
- Raritan River Railroad (reporting mark: RR)
- Buzz (Polish airline) (IATA code: RR), a Polish airline subsidiary of Ryanair Holdings
- Rhodesia Railways, former Zimbabwean railway company
- Rhymney Railway, former British railway company
- Royal Air Force (IATA airline designator RR)

=== Other uses in transportation ===
- Regional Road, a class of road in Ontario
- Rolls-Royce Holdings (LSE code and logo)
  - Rolls-Royce, several companies

== See also ==
- Roraima (ISO 3166 code: BR-RR), a state in Brazil
- Railroad Retirement Board (RRB), retirement benefits railroad workers
- R&R (disambiguation)
- R (disambiguation)
- RRR (disambiguation)
- RRRR (disambiguation)
