= The three Rs =

3 basic skills taught in schools: reading, writing, arithmetic

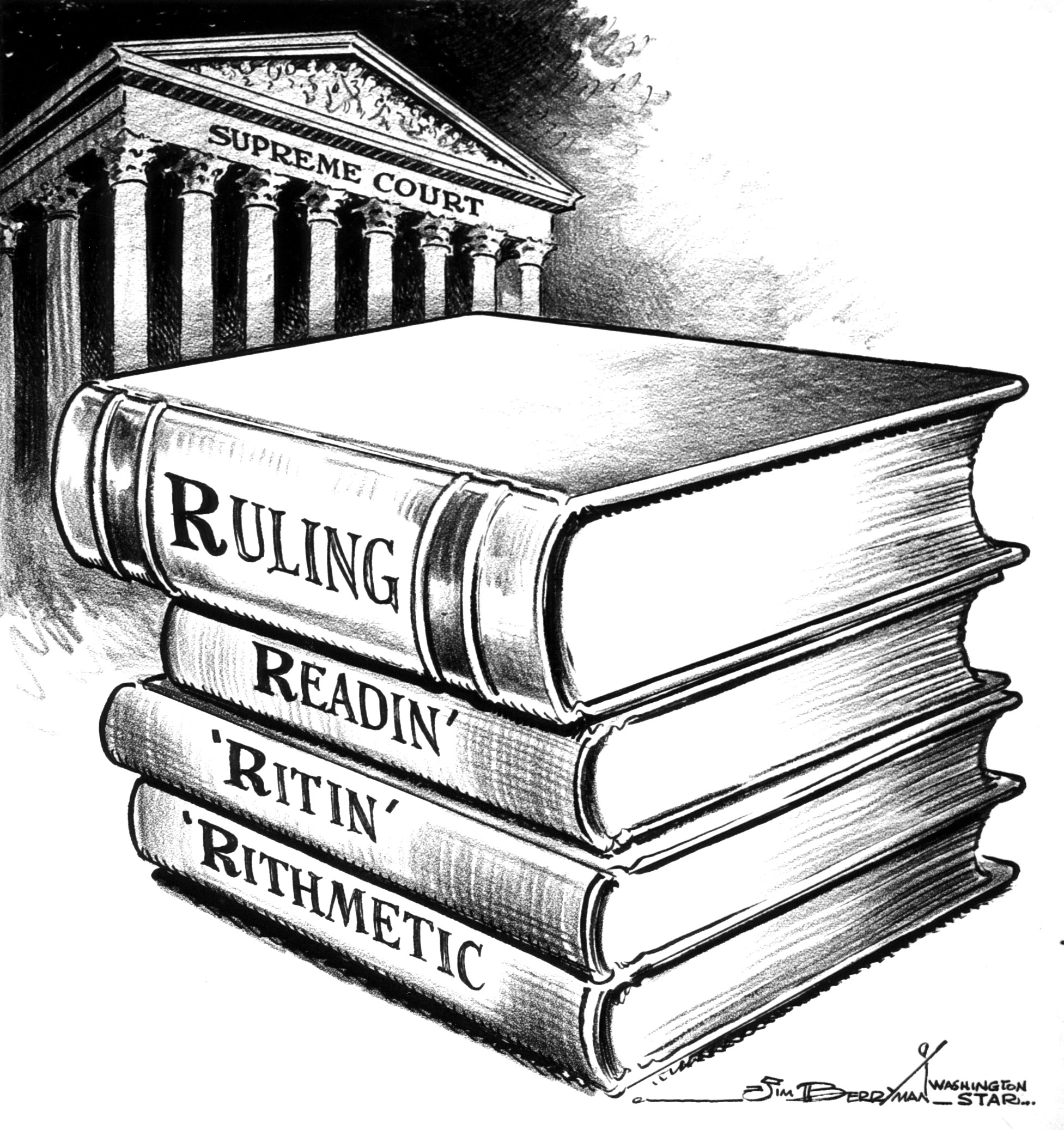
A 1958 political cartoon illustrates the role of the Supreme Court of the United States in American public education

The three Rs are three basic skills taught in schools: reading, writing and arithmetic (or reckoning; previously wroughting). The irregular initialism is based on phonetics rather than spelling. The phrase appears to have been coined at the beginning of the 19th century.

== Origin and meaning ==
The skills themselves are alluded to in St. Augustine's Confessions: Latin: legere et scribere et numerare discitur, lit. 'learning to read, and write, and do arithmetic' .

The phrase is sometimes attributed to a speech given by Sir William Curtis circa 1807, but this is disputed. An extended modern version of the three Rs consists of the "functional skills of literacy, numeracy and ICT".

The educationalist Louis P. Bénézet preferred "to read", "to reason", "to recite", adding, "by reciting I did not mean giving back, verbatim, the words of the teacher or of the textbook. I meant speaking the English language."

== See also ==
- Standards based education reform
- Traditional education
- Trivium (education)
