= Cadillac Gage Commando =

American amphibious armored car

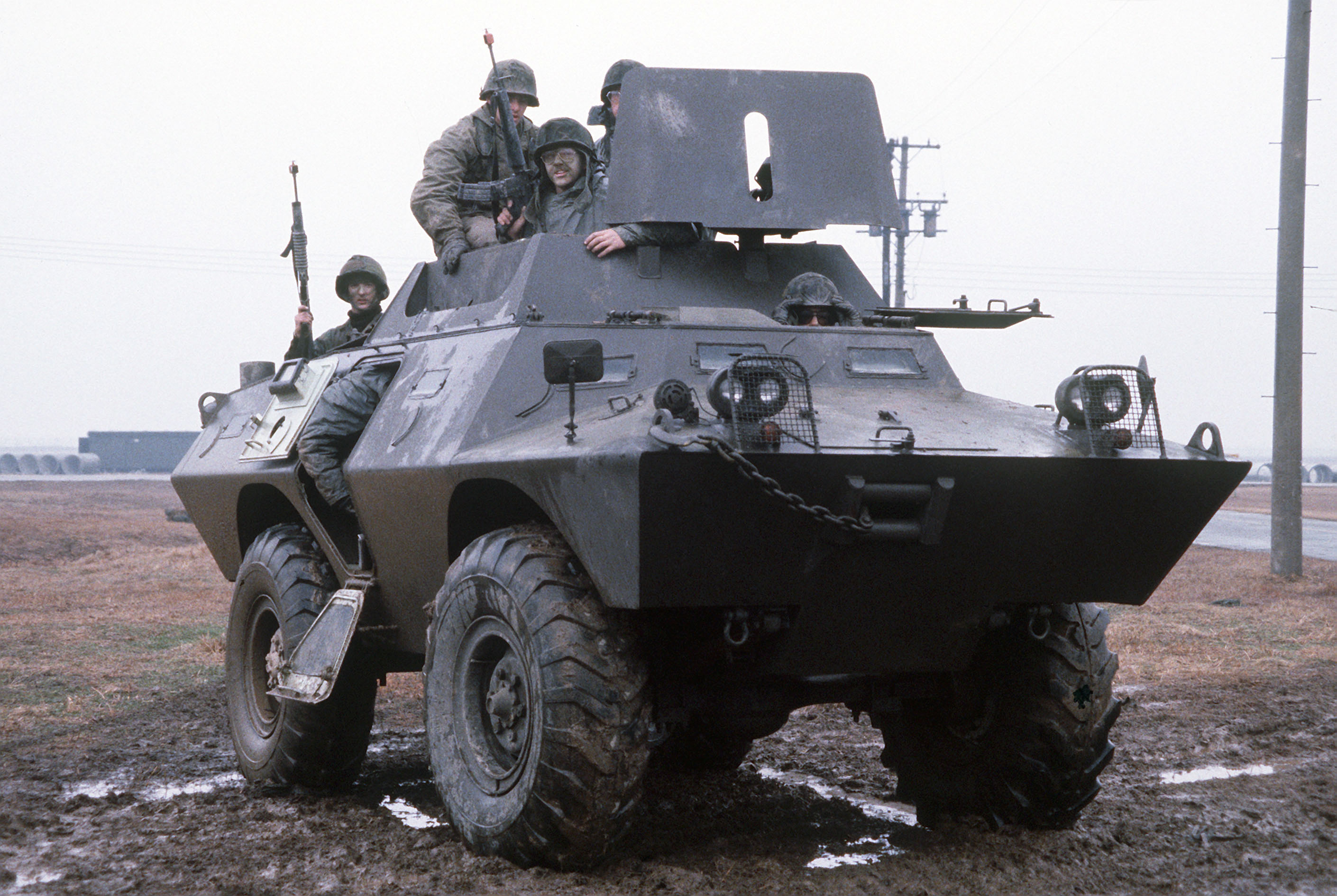
- US Air Force Security Policemen aboard a V-100 (XM-706E2) during exercise Team Spirit '81.
- Type: Armored car; Armored personnel carrier; Internal security vehicle
- Place of origin: United States

Service history
- Used by: See Operators
- Wars: List of Conflicts: Vietnam War; Cambodian Civil War; Lebanese Civil War; Guatemalan Civil War; Laotian Civil War; Communist insurgency in Sarawak; Communist insurgency in Malaysia (1968–89); Indonesian occupation of East Timor; Chadian–Libyan conflict; Second Sudanese Civil War; Somali Rebellion; 1989 Philippine coup d'état attempt; Gulf War; 2003–2004 Indonesian offensive in Aceh; South Thailand insurgency; Zamboanga City crisis; Battle of Marawi

Production history
- Designed: June 1962
- Manufacturer: Cadillac Gage
- Unit cost: US$30,000 (equivalent to $289,671 in 2025) in 1967
- Produced: 1963–2000
- No. built: 3,200
- Variants: See Variants

Specifications
- Mass: 7.37 tonnes (8.12 short tons; 7.25 long tons) (V-100); 9.8 tonnes (10.8 short tons; 9.6 long tons) (V-150); 12.73 tonnes (14.03 short tons; 12.53 long tons) (V-200)
- Length: 5.69 m (18 ft 8 in) (V-100/V-150); 6.12 m (20 ft 1 in) (V-200)
- Width: 2.26 m (7 ft 5 in) (V-100/V-150); 2.43 m (8 ft 0 in) (V-200)
- Height: 2.4 m (7 ft 10 in) (V-100/V-200); 2.5 m (8 ft 2 in) (V-150)
- Crew: 3 (commander, gunner, driver) + 9 passengers
- Main armament: 1× Cockerill Mk3 90 mm cannon 1× 20 mm autocannon 1× 40 mm grenade machine gun 1× 12.7 mm machine gun 1× 7.62 mm machine gun
- Secondary armament: 2× 6× 40 mm smoke grenade launchers
- Engine: Chrysler 361 eight-cylinder petrol 210 hp (156 kW) at 4,000 rpm
- Power/weight: 20.42 hp/tonne (15.22 kW/tonne)
- Ground clearance: 0.38 m (V-100/V-150); 0.43 (V-200)
- Fuel capacity: 303 liters (V-100/V-150); 379 liters (V-200)
- Operational range: 644 km
- Maximum speed: 100 km/h (62 mph)

The Cadillac Gage Commando, frequently denoted as the M706 in U.S. military service, is an American armored car designed to be amphibious. It was engineered by Cadillac Gage specifically for the United States Military Police Corps during the Vietnam War as an armed convoy escort vehicle. The Commando was one of the first vehicles to combine the traditionally separate roles of an armored personnel carrier and a conventional armored car, much like the Soviet BTR-40. Its notable height, amphibious capability, and waterproofed engine allowed American crews to fight effectively in the jungles of Vietnam by observing their opponents over thick vegetation and fording the country's deep rivers.

The Commando was eventually produced in three distinct marks: the V-100, V-150, and V-200, all of which were modified for a number of diverse battlefield roles. An unlicensed copy of the Commando series, the Bravia Chaimite, was also manufactured in Portugal. After the U.S. military's disengagement from South Vietnam, the Commando series was gradually retired from active U.S. service. It was superseded in the Military Police Corps by the derivative M1117 armored security vehicle during the 1990s.

== Design and development ==
The V-100 series of vehicles was developed in the early 1960s by the Terra-Space division of the Cadillac Gage company of Warren, Michigan. By 1962 a patent was filed and received by Terra-Space for a vehicle then only known as the Commando. The first prototype emerged in 1963, and the production variants entered service in 1964.

A V-100 (XM706) Armored Car advertisement showing a turret featuring a minigun

The vehicle is equipped with four-wheel drive and uses axles similar to the ones used in the M35 series of trucks. The engine is a gasoline-powered 360-cubic-inch Chrysler V8, same as in the early gas models of the M113 armored personnel carriers. Its 5-speed manual transmission allows it to traverse relatively rough terrain. The M706 has a road speed of 62 mph (100 km/h), and can travel across water at 3 mph (4.8 km/h).

A Commando's armor consists of high hardness alloy steel called Cadaloy, which protects against projectiles up to 7.62×51mm. Partly because of its armor, the M706 has an unloaded mass of over 7 tons. As a result, a common problem with the vehicle is rear axle failure caused by the extreme weight. However, because the armor also provides the monocoque structural framework, it can be lighter than a soft vehicle to which armor has been added, and the angle of the armor also helps protect against hits and mine blasts.

The V-100 was available in turret and open-top models. Factory prototype turret options included the T-60, T-70, and T-90. The T-60 featured a combination of either two .50 caliber machine guns, two .30 caliber machine guns, or one of each, and had manual traverse.

The specific .30 caliber machine gun options were extremely varied, with from factory configurations including the M1919A4E1, M37, M73, M219, and MG42. Later the M60 and FN MAG were also added to the list of options. The Cadillac Gage company also intended to use the solenoid trigger equipped fixed machine gun version of the Stoner 63 weapon system, but this was dropped after tests showed the smaller caliber cartridge to be unsuited to this role.

The T-90 featured a single 20 mm cannon with power traverse. The T-70, developed for police use, featured 4 tear gas launchers, vision blocks all around the turret for 360-degree vision, and no other weapons. The T-70 and T-90 were not put into mass production; instead, a modified T-60—with the guns centrally mounted, rather than along the outer edges—became the standard. A variant of this turret featuring the 7.62 mm General Electric Minigun was also developed.

In addition an open-topped variant with a central parapet was developed. The intended usage of this variant was to be a mortar portee, but a total of five machine gun mounts could also be fitted. There were 2 in front, one in the rear all three M2 Browning or Mk 19 capable and one folding pintle point on each side capable of mounting any .30 caliber machine gun such as the M1919 Browning machine gun, M60 or any other machine gun of that class. An enclosed raised superstructure "pod" was also developed for converting the V-100 into either a command vehicle or for police use. The variants for police work featured special elongated firing ports for better angles of fire for tear gas grenade launchers.

Relatively large-gunned variants of the V-100 began appearing in 1964, when Cadillac Gage marketed the Commando against the Alvis Saladin and Panhard AML-90 for a Royal Saudi Army requirement specifying a wheeled armoured vehicle equipped with a large semi-automatic cannon. A number of V-150s were later successfully tested and offered with a Mecar low-pressure 90 mm smoothbore gun. With the new turret and gun, the V-150 was manned by a crew of three, although it retained enough space for eight additional passengers if no additional shell racks were added.

At maximum capacity its hull could store up to thirty-nine rounds of 90 mm ammunition and still seat four additional passengers. Subsequent V-150 models incorporated a slightly larger turret armed with a much more powerful Cockerill Mk.III 90 mm gun, the same as that carried by the EE-9 Cascavel. A third fire support option involved the retrofitting of the Commando chassis with the complete turret and 76 mm L23A1 gun of the British FV101 Scorpion tracked reconnaissance vehicle.

Marketing for the V-150 family was halted in 2000.

In 2010, Federal Defense Industries announced that they entered into an agreement with Textron Marine & Land Systems in order to provide authorized aftermarket parts, support and other types of assistance for the V-100/150/200 since FDI maintains a technical library for spare parts.

In 2011, Napco entered into an agreement with Textron to provide authorized aftermarket parts, support and other types of assistance for the V-100/150.

== Operational use ==
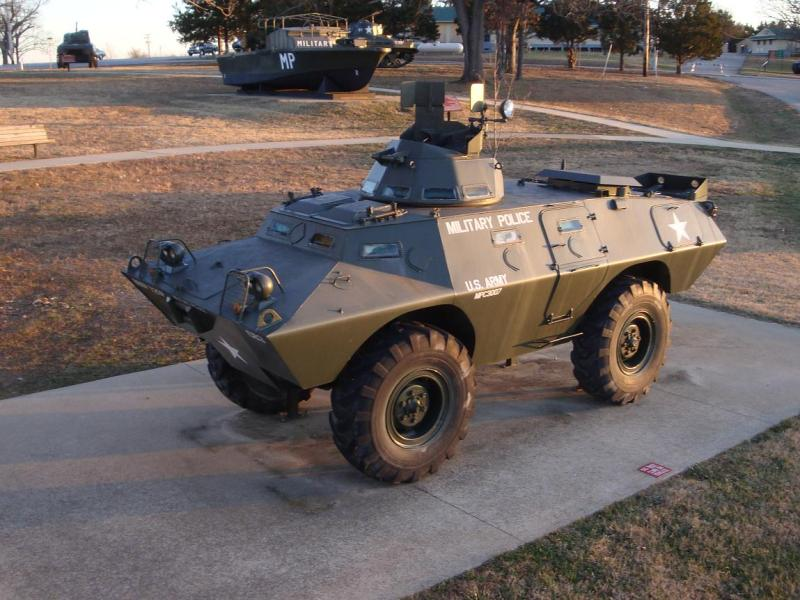
The M706 armored car at Fort Leonard Wood.

The Commando was originally deployed to South Vietnam in September 1963 for use by the U.S. Army Military Police, United States Air Force, United States Marine Corps and allied forces including the Army of the Republic of Vietnam (ARVN). It was introduced in Vietnam as the XM706 Commando first to the ARVN who loaned the first examples to the U.S. Army in June 1967. By the end of 1968, the U.S. Army had purchased its own version of the armored car, the XM706E1, later standardized as the M706. Within the U.S. Army it was affectionately known as the Duck, or the V.

The main differences between the XM706 and XM706E1/M706 were in the design of the gas tank fill port covers, side windows, front vision blocks, and most importantly in the weaponry. The XM706 featured two .30-06 caliber M37 machine guns, while the XM706E1/M706 for the U.S. Army featured two 7.62mm NATO M73 machine guns for better ammunition commonality with existing weapons. The ARVN, on the other hand, were still using a variety of weapons in the .30-06 caliber and had relevant ammunition in their supply train.

In practice, the ARVN found the standard two-gun armament to be lacking and often mounted an additional M1919A4 machine gun on a standard tripod mount at the rear radio operator's hatch. A number of their V-100s were also refitted with the combination turret armament of one M37 and one .50 BMG-caliber M2HB machine gun. The V-100 in with the ARVN mainly saw service in armored car elements of armored cavalry units, but also as part of the mechanized platoons of the South Vietnamese Regional Forces. Compared to the American counterparts ARVN V-100 units had larger crews, including a commander riding shotgun, and a radio operator outside the rear hatch.

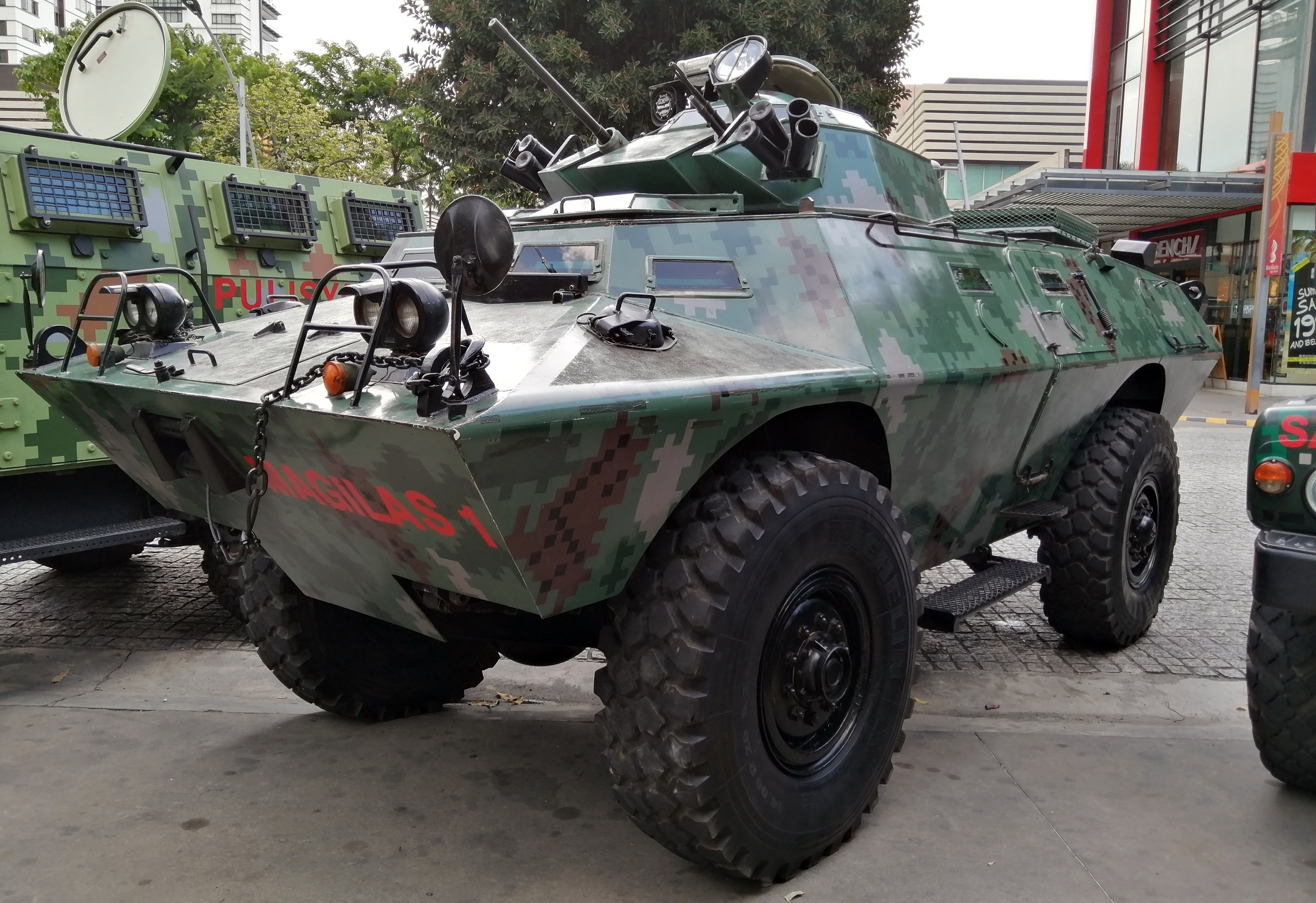
Side view of a V-150 Armored Vehicle of the Special Action Force (SAF) with another type of turret. Photo taken during the SAF 36th Anniversary Capability and Skills Exhibit at the Bonifacio Global City (BGC).

Another model, the XM706E2, was supplied to the U.S. Air Force for base protection purposes, post-attack reconnaissance against munitions and EOD use. The XM706E2 featured no turret and an open-topped center parapet. In practice a variety of weapons were mounted on USAF XM706E2s, but the most common configuration was one M2HB machine gun and one M60 machine gun. Other equipment included the XM174 40 mm grenade launcher and searchlights.

The 3rd Security Police Group of the United States Air Force at Clark Air Base Republic of the Philippines was still operating the "Duck" as a Fire-Team vehicle until it received M1026 HMMWVs in the fall of 1988. The vehicles were then semi-retired, and occasionally used as "steel bunkers” at the gates, because of the difficulty in keeping the 20-year-old vehicles running.

The V-100 carries a maximum crew of two with up to 10 passengers. In road patrol, convoy duty and base defense use by the U.S. Army's Military Police, it usually had a crew of two: driver and gunner. Additional armament often included two or three top-mounted M2 or M60 machine guns. Other weapons such as M134 Miniguns were also sometimes used. Passengers could also use their personal weapons to fire through the vehicle's various gun ports.

In spite of its effectiveness during the Vietnam War, the U.S. military made limited use of the V-100s after the war, deploying only small units of the armored cars with U.S. Army Military Police platoons at the Herlong Army Depot in California during the 1970s, or other related sites across the country. The remaining V-100s were expended as "hard targets" for tank and machinegun ranges throughout various military installations.

Survivors remain in service with various smaller forces, such as the People's Army of Vietnam, Republic of China Military Police, the Philippine Army, Marine Corps, and Special Action Force of the Philippine National Police, the Lebanese Armed Forces, the Army of Venezuela and the Jamaica Defence Force. It was used by the Malaysian Army in Second Malayan Emergency and Royal Malaysia Police (GOF- Pasukan Gerakan Am) until now. They are used by the Royal Thai Army, and were deployed in the Burmese border as part of the Battle of Border Post 9631 in 2001. The vehicle is also used by many SWAT units in the U.S. and gendarmerie forces overseas. The V-100 is the predecessor of the M1117 armored security vehicle which was used by the U.S. Army for convoy protection and other duties in Iraq and Afghanistan.

For many years the Los Angeles Police Department (LAPD) operated 2 V-100s for use by the LAPD Metropolitan Division D Platoon. The LAPD obtained the V-100s from the U.S. Department of Energy in the early 1980s for Los Angeles' hosting of the 1984 Summer Olympics. The vehicles were disarmed, and upgraded with a 10-foot (3.0 m) battering ram used to breach buildings in a raid. The battering ram's flat end was decorated with a smiley face and captioned "Have a nice day." The LAPD has retired the V-100 vehicles, with their last major deployment being the 1997 North Hollywood shootout.

== Variants ==
Cadillac Gage's basic V-100 vehicle spawned an entire series of vehicles. This development was continued even after the production and further development of the system was passed to Marine and Land Division of the Textron company. These included updated 4×4 vehicles, but also expanded 6×6 vehicles utilizing a similar design and some basic components.

=== V-150 ===
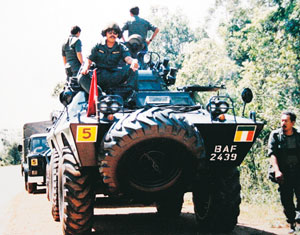
Royal Malaysia Police General Operations Forces personnel on a Cadillac Gage Commando V-150 whilst conducting jungle operations in 1985

The V-150 was a hybrid variant which was based on the V-200 but had some V-100 features. It came after the V-200. It could be equipped with diesel or gasoline engines and most were produced for the Saudi Arabian National Guard as the V-150S. The V-150 was initially fitted with the same Chrysler V8 gasoline engine and three-speed transmission as the V-100, but these were later superseded by a Cummins six-cylinder engine and a four-speed automatic transmission.

Unlike the V-200, all V-150s retained the same size and dimensions of the earlier V-100s; however, they were manufactured with heavier axles and modified suspension units. The V-150's hull was also designed specifically to carry heavier weapons systems, such as large smoothbore guns for fire support and anti-tank purposes.

In the 1980s Portugal updated its Chaimites (originally built between 1967 and 1974) with a 90 mm turret (V-400), but the Portuguese Army also bought 15 examples of the U.S.-made V-150 Commando.

The Philippine Army continue to use their V-150s in 2017, when several photos appeared on social media of a vehicle with heavy wooden planks and flattened ammunition crates were applied as improvised armor against ISIL insurgents in the southern islands. The effectiveness of the improvised vehicle armor against proper rocket-propelled grenades is doubtful, but it has been judged to reduce some of the RPG's damage. On June 7, 2023, LAV-150s upgraded by Larsen & Toubro were tested in Bulacan.

=== HMV-150 ===
The HMV-150 is a modernized and upgraded variant of the V-150 created by Thailand in 2017, designed by Panus Assembly. The HMV-150 has a new design to respond to new threats and especially to offer more protection against mines and IEDs. The armored vehicle was made after the Royal Thai Navy (RTN) donated a damaged V-150 due to it beyond salvageable repair. Panus modified the damaged vehicle over eight months.

The internal layout of the vehicle is also modified to offer more internal space, giving a capacity to carry up to ten military personnel.

The vehicle is fitted with a new 8.9 liter Cummins ISL engine Euro 3 developing 350 hp. coupled to a new Allison 4500 automatic transmission with six gears. The HMV-150 can achieve a maximum road speed of 110 km/h (68 mph).

An unknown amount of HMV-150s have been delivered. Currently they are being operated by the Royal Thai Armed Forces, most especially the RTN and the Royal Thai Marine Corps through donations. They were first deployed in 2017 to South Thailand in combat operations.

The HMV-150 has been further developed from 2018 as the HMV-420.

=== V-200 ===
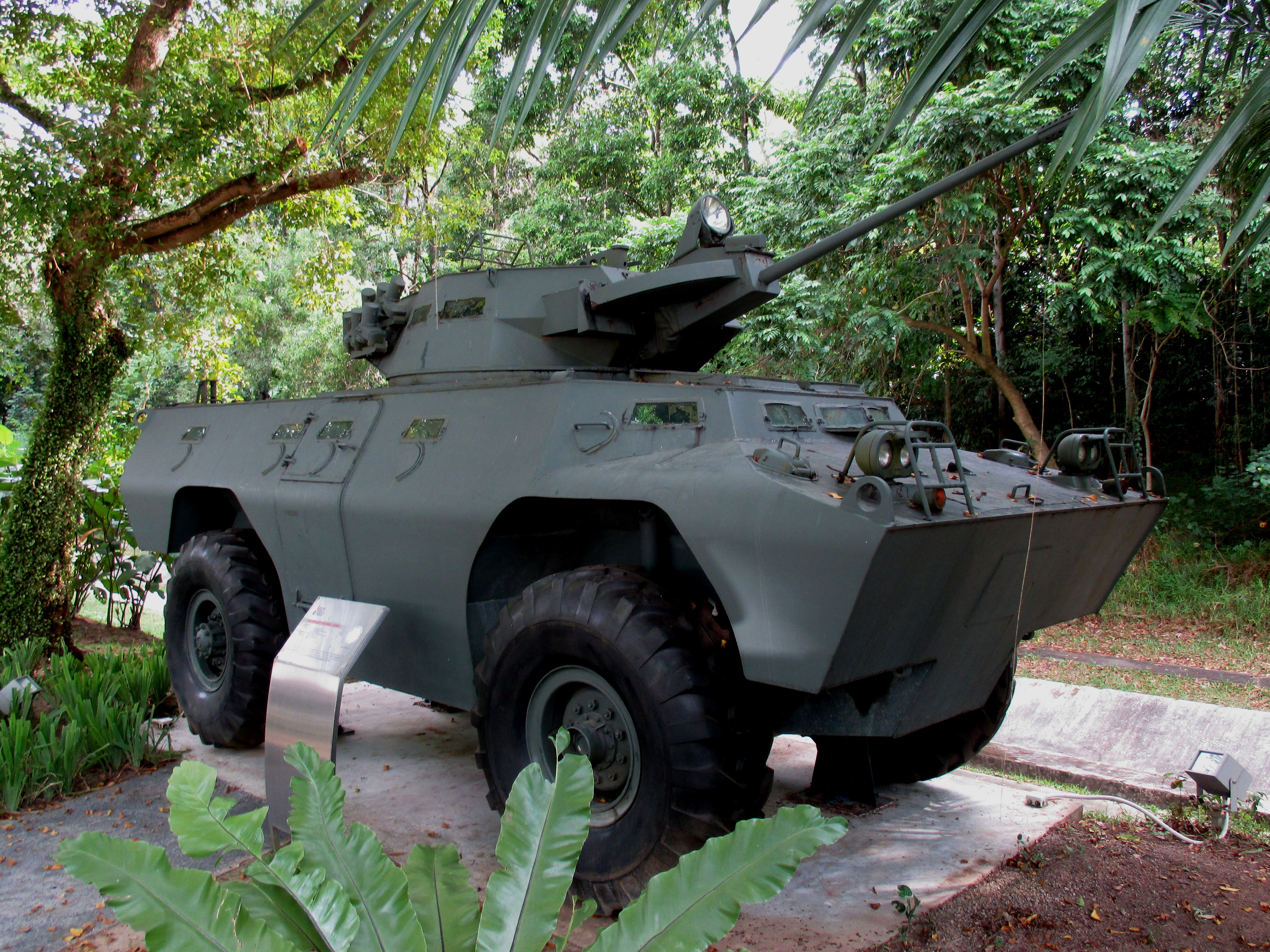
A Singapore Army V-200 Commando with 20 mm cannon.

The V-200 was essentially an enlarged version of the V-100 and utilized many components of the U.S. Army's 5-ton trucks. This version was designed to the specifications of the Singapore Armed Forces (SAF) and entered service in 1968. It was fitted with a custom diesel engine and was notably heavier than the V-100. ST Kinetics upgraded the Singaporean fleet of V-200 vehicles in 2002 with electric turret drives and made some detail improvements to both the engine and transmission. The Singapore Army continued to hold two hundred V-200s in reserve until 2015, when they were formally retired and replaced by the Peacekeeper Protected Response Vehicle (PRV).

Fifty V-200s were operated by the Republic of Singapore Air Force for on-base security and equipped with Swedish-manufactured RBS 70 surface to air missiles in a turret mount. It is unclear whether these were retired in 2015 as well.

=== LAV-300 ===
Originally named as the V-300, the LAV-300 is a 6×6 variant originally designed for a heavy weapons support role.

=== LAV-600 ===
The V-600 is a much heavier version of the V-300 and was intended to fulfill heavier weapons support. The primary version is equipped with a 105 mm turret.

== Military operators ==
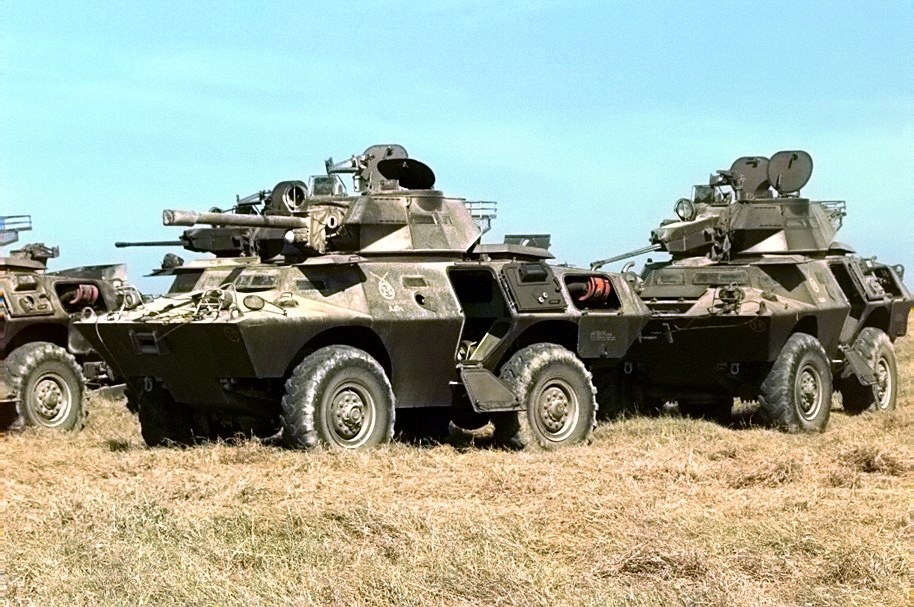
Several 90 mm and 20 mm V-150s of the Haitian Army seized by the U.S. military during Operation Uphold Democracy, 24 September 1994.

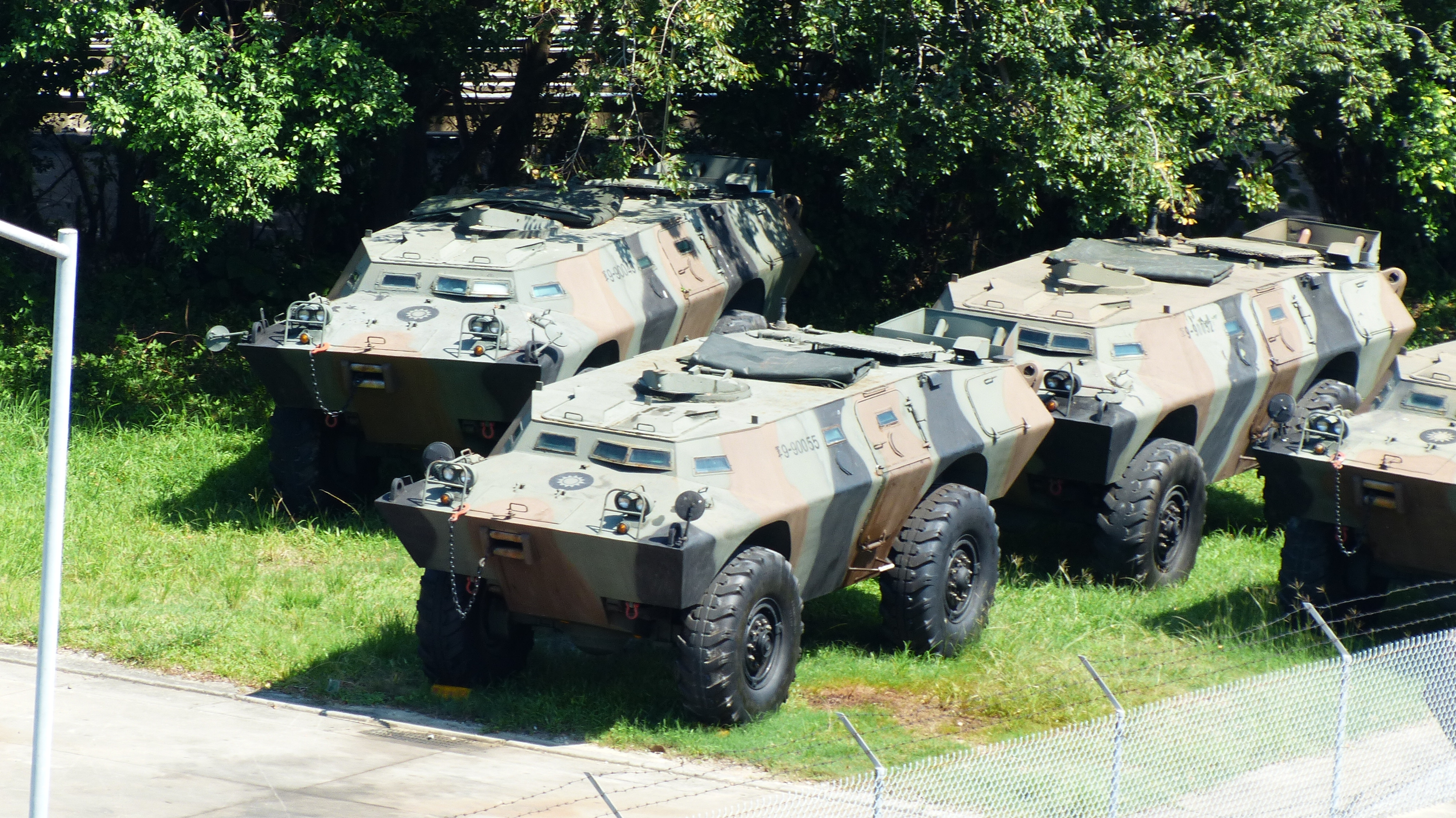
V-150s of the Taiwanese military police in 2016.

=== V-100 ===
- Bolivia: 10
- Cambodia
- Guatemala: 7
- Laos
- Lebanon: 9
- Oman: 15
- Peru: 20
- Sudan: 45
- Venezuela: 30
- Vietnam: Unknown numbers in service, upgraded by the Military Mechanical Engineering Institute with assistance from Z751 factory to replace old and worn out parts after Vietnam was reunified, with American-made weapons replaced with Russian-based weapons, acquired through capturing them in the Vietnam War.

=== V-150 ===
- Botswana: 14
- Cameroon: 43; Being replaced by Norinco Type 07Ps to be used with the Cameroonian Army's Armoured Reconnaissance Battalion (Bataillon Blindé de Reconnaissance).
- Chad: 9
- Dominican Republic: 8
- Egypt: 112
- Ethiopia: 12
- Gabon: 9
- Haiti: 6
- Indonesia: 58
- Jamaica: 14
- Kuwait: 20
- Mexico: 28
- Philippines: 185 Delivered.
  - Philippine Army - 130 Units
  - Philippine Marine Corps - 18 Units
  - Philippine Air Force -4 Units
- Portugal: 15
- Saudi Arabia: 1,100; 521 for the Saudi Army and 539 for the Saudi Arabian National Guard
- Somalia: 15
- Sudan: 80
- Syrian National Army: 14 donated to police forces by Turkey in 2017
- Taiwan: 300
- Thailand: 150 Upgrades done by Panus Assembly as the HMV-150, which has an 8.9 liter Cummins ISL engine with a new Allison 4500 automatic transmission with six gears. Currently manufactured as the Panus AFV-420P.
- Tunisia: 14
- Venezuela: 100

=== Former operators ===
- Luxembourg: Used by the Luxembourg Armed Forces from 1981 until 2000. At least one unit transferred to the Grand Ducal Police and used until 2005, now at the Police Musee.
- Malaysia: 100 units V-100
- South Vietnam: 125 units V-100
- Singapore: 30 units V-100, 40 units V-150, 250 units V-200
- United States
  - United States Air Force
  - United States Army
  - United States Navy

== Civil operators ==
- Malaysia: 138 V-150.Limited number still active in Royal Malaysia Police.
- Philippines: Philippine National Police 15 active out of 28 units in inventory, as of 2011.
- Turkey: 158 V-150s; used by Turkish National Police.
- United States: at least 11 V-150s owned by state, county, and municipal police departments.
  - United States Department of Energy: 2 were transferred to the Los Angeles Police Department in the early 1980s.
  - Florida Highway Patrol: 3
  - Louisiana State Police: At least one V-150 was in service as late as 2005, was used for riot control in the aftermath of Hurricane Katrina.
  - Opelousas, Louisiana Police Department: 1.
  - Marion County, Oregon Sheriff's Office
  - Linn County, Oregon Sheriff's Office: 1
  - Los Angeles Police Department: Two V-100s were obtained from the United States Department of Energy in the early 1980s, at least 1 was still in use as late as 1998, but both have since been retired.
  - Metropolitan Police Department of the District of Columbia: Had at least one ex-USAF 1967 V-100, which was later given to the Prince George's County Sheriff's Office in Maryland.
  - Prince George's County Sheriff's Office: Had at least one ex-USAF 1967 V-100 in service as of 1998, which was acquired from the MPDC in Washington, D.C. Two additional V-100s were also acquired for spare parts and maintenance purposes, one of which was received from the U.S. Park Police.
  - Stamford, Connecticut Police Department: 1, to be replaced.
  - Fort Wayne, Indiana Police Department: 1
  - Cranston, Rhode Island Police Department: 1
  - United States Park Police, later given to the Prince George's County Sheriff's Office in Maryland.
  - (Washington (state)) Walla Walla County Sheriff's Office: 1 ex-U.S. Navy 1994 Commando V-150S acquired in August 2002.

== Vehicles on display ==
=== Canada ===
- M706 V100 Commando - The Ontario Regiment RCAC Museum Collection

=== Malaysia ===
- V-150 FSV 90mm is on outdoor display at Army Museum Port Dickson.
- V-150 IFV is on outdoor display at Army Museum Port Dickson
- V-100 IFV is on outdoor Royal Malaysia Police, Kuala Lumpur
- V-100 IFV is on outdoor Bukit Kepong Gallery, Muar Johor

=== Philippines ===
==== Philippine Army ====
- LAV-150 Commando at the Philippine Army Museum in Fort Bonifacio, Taguig.
- LAV-150 Commando at Light Armored Division Museum, Camp O'Donnell, Brgy. Sta. Lucia, Capas, Tarlac, Central Luzon, Luzon.
- LAV-150 Commando on outdoor display at Camp Servillano Aquino Tarlac City, Tarlac.
- LAV-150 Commando on static outdoor display at Philippine Military Academy Relics Points, Baguio City, Benguet, Luzon.
- LAV-150 Commando in Light Armour Division markings on outdoor static display at Tagaytay Library and Museum Tagaytay.

==== Philippine Marine Corps ====
- LAV-150 APC on outdoor static display at Marine Corps Camp Cape Bojeador Burgos, Ilocos Norte.

==== Philippine National Police ====
- LAV-150 20mm IFV on outdoor static Display at Fort Sto Domingo Sta Rosa, Laguna.

=== Singapore ===
- Singapore Army V-200 Commando with 20 mm cannon at Army Museum of Singapore.

=== Taiwan ===
- LAV-150 Commando Vehicle- Personnel at Republic of China Armed Forces Museum

=== United States ===
- M706 armored car at Fort Leonard Wood.
- V-100 (XM706E2) Commando at National Museum of the United States Air Force.
- Cadillac “Gage Commando” M706 or V-100 Armored Car at The American Military Museum.

== Similar vehicles ==
- M1117 "Guardian" armored security vehicle – a Commando derived vehicle for the United States Army Military Police Corps.
- Bravia Chaimite – a Portuguese vehicle similar to the Commando.
- Armadillo (APC) - a vehicle inspired by the V100, build in Guatemala.
- Dragoon AFV – a vehicle produced by Arrowpointe Corporation (now General Dynamics Land Division).
- The French Berliet VXB-170, which was built in small numbers for the Gendarmerie and for Gabon.
- BOV – a Yugoslav manufactured vehicle, it was later supplanted by the LOV in some former Yugoslav countries.
- BRDM-2 – a Soviet scout car.
- BDX - Belgian copy of an Irish design. 123 manufactured for the Rijkswacht (Gendarmerie; 80) and Air Force security personnel (43).
- D-442 FUG PSZH - (Felderítő Úszó Gépkocsi – "amphibious reconnaissance vehicle") and D-944 PSZH (Páncélozott Személyszállító Harcjármű – "armored personnel carrier") are the results of Hungarian domestic development of relatively cheap amphibious armoured scout car and armored personnel carrier series.

== See also ==
- Bravia Chaimite – (Portugal)
- Cadillac Gage Commando Scout – (United States) light reconnaissance vehicle
