= Water Forest =

Water Forest may refer to:

- Water Forest (album), 2003 album by Japanese singer-songwriter Rurutia
- Water Forest (Xinghua), park in Xinghua, Jiangsu, China
- Water Forest Press Publishing, book publisher in Pennsylvania, the United States
