= Pavane =

Dance common in 16th century Europe

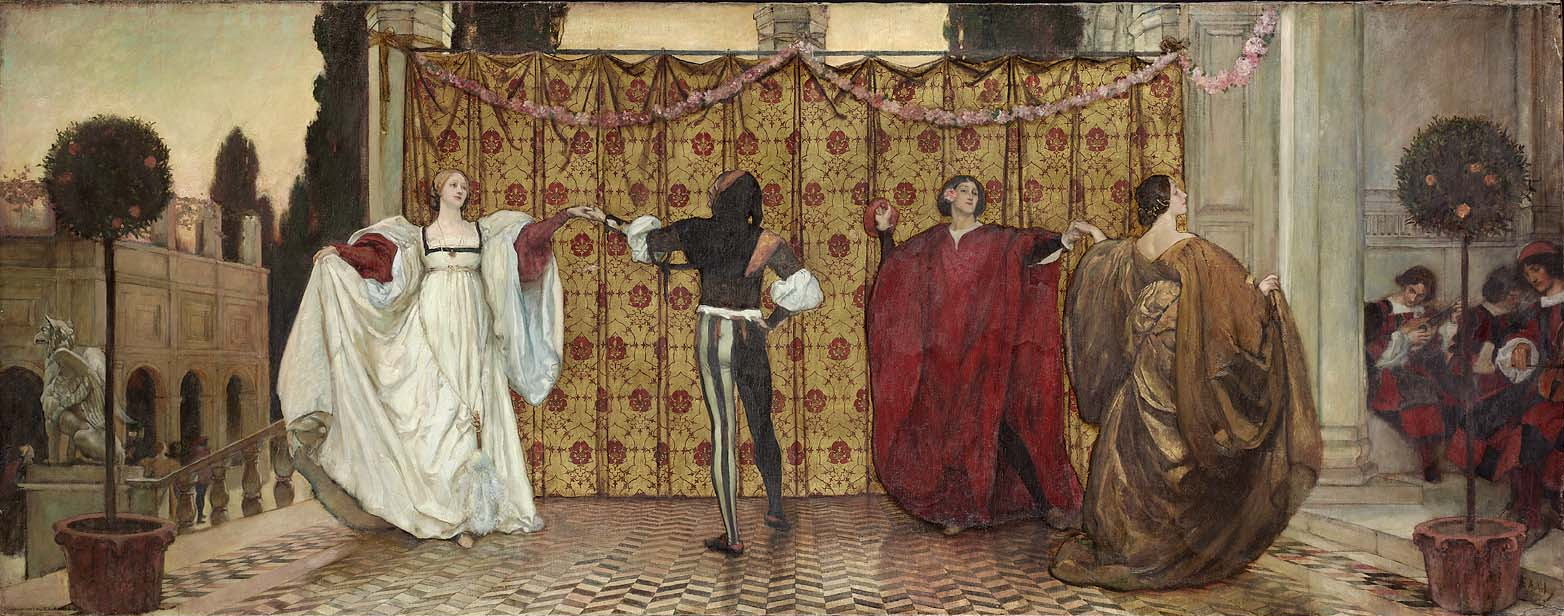
A Pavane, Edwin Austin Abbey, 1897

The pavane (Note: Variously attested as pavan, paven, pavin, pavian, pavine, or pavyn.) (/pəˈvɑːn, pəˈvæn/ pə-VA(H)N; Italian: pavana, padovana; German: Paduana) is a slow processional dance common in Europe during the 16th century (Renaissance).

The pavane, the earliest-known music for which was published in Venice by Ottaviano Petrucci, in Joan Ambrosio Dalza's Intabolatura de lauto libro quarto in 1508, is a sedate and dignified couple dance, similar to the 15th-century basse danse. The music which accompanied it appears originally to have been fast or moderately fast but, like many other dances, became slower over time.

== Origin of term ==
The word pavane is most probably derived from Italian [danza] padovana, meaning "[dance] typical of Padua" (similar to Bergamask, "dance from Bergamo"); pavan is an old Northern Italian form for the modern Italian adjective padovano (= from Padua). (Note: this is reflected also, for example, in the family name Pavan, rather diffuse in northern Italy.) This origin is consistent with the equivalent form, Paduana.

An alternative explanation is that it derives from the Spanish pavón meaning peacock.

Although the dance is often associated with Spain, it is "almost certainly of Italian origin".

== History ==
The decorous sweep of the pavane suited the new more sober Spanish-influenced courtly manners of 16th-century Italy. It appears in dance manuals in England, France, and Italy.

The pavane's popularity was from roughly 1530 to 1676, though, as a dance, it was already dying out by the late 16th century. As a musical form, the pavane survived long after the dance itself was abandoned, and well into the Baroque period, when it finally gave way to the allemande/courante sequence..

== Music ==
Pavan à6 in F, VdGS No.2, Oxford. Bodleian Library, Mus.Sch. c.83, II/2 (ca.1667)
By John Jenkins. Performed by Phillip W. Serna, Treble, Tenor & Bass Viols

- Slow duple metre (2/2 or 4/4) by the late 16th century, though there is evidence that it was still a fast dance as late as the mid-16th century, and there are also examples of triple-time pavanes from Spain, Italy, and England.
- Two strains of eight, twelve, or sixteen bars each.
- Accent generally comes on the third beat with a secondary accent on the 1st beat though some pavanes place the accent on the first beat with the secondary accent falling on the third.
- Generally follows the form of A–A′–B–B′–C–C′.
- It generally uses counterpoint or homophonic accompaniment.
- Often accompanied by a tabor in a rhythmic pattern of minim–crotchet–crotchet (1/2–1/4–1/4) or similar.
- This dance was generally paired with the Galliard.
- Usually no florid or running passages in instrumental ensemble settings, but pavans for solo instruments usually included written-out repeat sections with variations.

== Dance ==
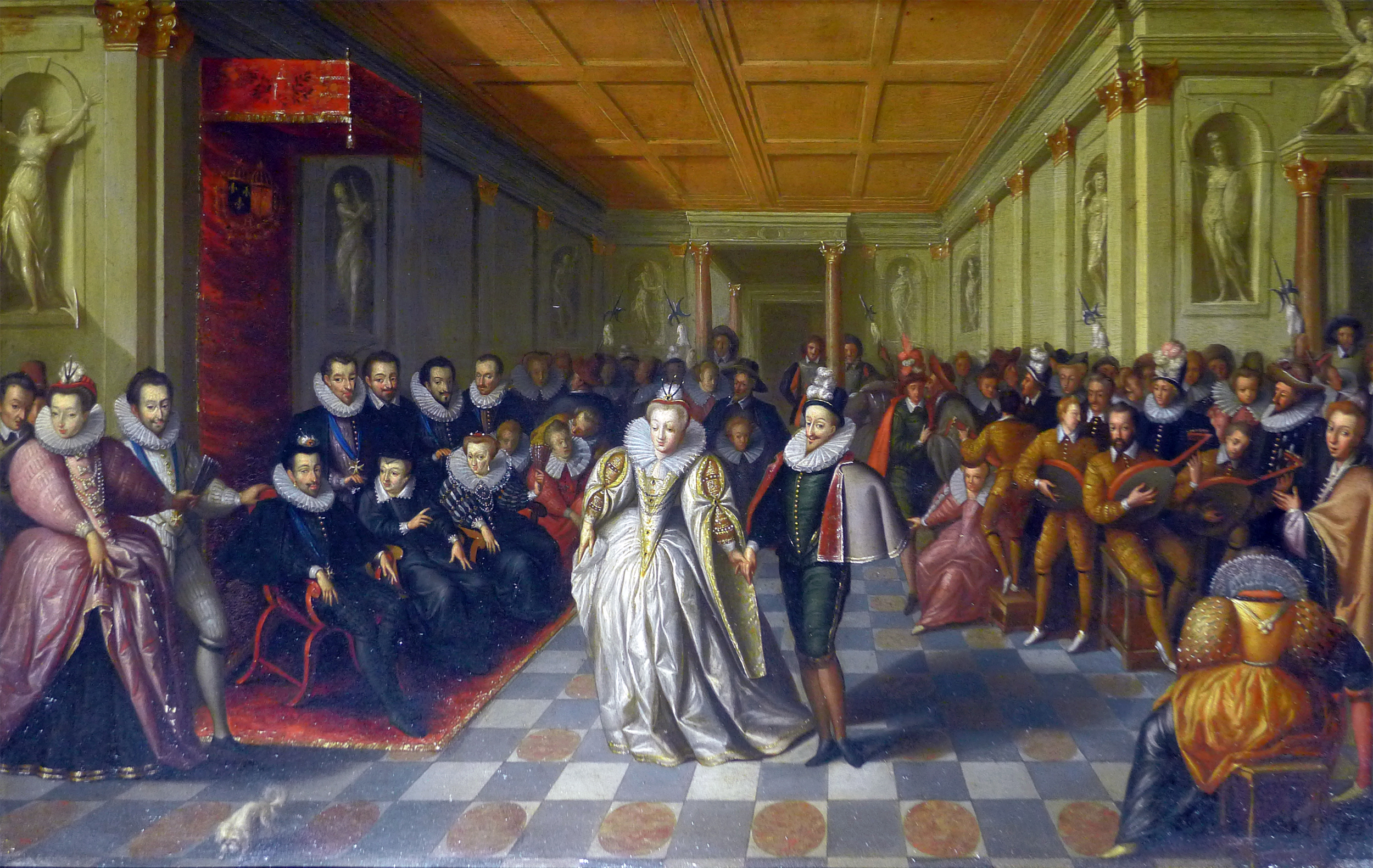
At the royal court of Henry III of France: Anne de Joyeuse and his wife Marguerite de Vaudémont-Lorraine, dancing a pavane. Left under the canopy the king and his mother Catherine de' Medici, to the right of her Queen Louise. The musicians on the right side. (c. 1581)

In Thoinot Arbeau's French dance manual, it is generally a dance for many couples in procession, with the dancers sometimes throwing in ornamentation (divisions) of the steps.

The Dictionnaire de Trevoux describes the dance as being a "grave kind of dance, borrowed from the Spaniards, wherein the performers make a kind of wheel or tail before each other, like that of a peacock, whence the name." It was usually used by regents to open grand ceremonies and to display their royal attire. Before dancing, the performers saluted the King and Queen whilst circling the room. The steps were called advancing and retreating. Retreating gentlemen would lead their ladies by the hand and, after curtsies and steps, the gentlemen would regain their places. Next, a lone gentleman advanced and went en se pavanant (strutting like a peacock) to salute the lady opposite him. After taking backward steps, he would return to his place, bowing to his lady.

== Modern use ==
The step used in the pavane survives to the modern day in the hesitation step sometimes used at weddings.

More recent works titled "pavane" often have a deliberately archaic mood. Examples include:

- Pavane (1887) by Gabriel Fauré, a modern version of the Renaissance genre.
- Tears and Pavan (1973) by The Strawbs
- Pavanne (sic) (1978) by Linda Thompson (singer)
- Pavan (2015) by Julian Bream
- Pavane pour une infante défunte (1899) by Maurice Ravel.

Pavane pour une infante défunte
By Maurice Ravel. Performed by Thérèse Dussaut.

- The third part of the Piano Suite No. 2 Op. 10, by George Enescu (1903)
- Pavane from Peter Warlock’s Capriol Suite (1926)
- De la Mare's Pavane from Herbert Howells' Lambert's Clavichord (1927)
- The "Pavane of the Sons of the Morning" that closes scene 7 of Job: A Masque for Dancing, a ballet composed by Ralph Vaughan Williams in 1930 and first staged in 1931.
- "Pavane, the Girl with the Flaxen Hair", a dramatic script written and directed by Wyllis Cooper, inspired in part by Debussy's composition, for the old-time radio series Quiet, Please (1947).
- The Moor's Pavane (1949), a ballet choreographed by José Limón.
- The science fiction novel Pavane (1968) by British author Keith Roberts, about an alternative history in which Queen Elizabeth I is assassinated and the Armada wins in the year 1588, using the musical term as a metaphor for the book's setting.
- The song "Pavan" (1970) from the progressive folk album Evensong by Amazing Blondel.
- The first part of Maurice Ravel's Ma mère l'oye suite (1910), entitled "Pavane for the Sleeping Beauty", covered (as "Pavanne") by Joe Walsh on his album So What (1974).
- The fourth movement of the suite "The Fall of the House of Usher" from the progressive rock album Tales of Mystery and Imagination by The Alan Parsons Project (1976).
- The song "Pavane" by Jon Lord of the band Deep Purple, written and recorded for his solo album Sarabande (1976).
- The track "Pavanne" (sic) is a duet between Keith Tippett (church pipe organ) and Mark Charig (cornet), from their album "Pipedream" (1977).
- "Pavane for a Dead Princess" (1978), a jazz version of Maurice Ravel's composition by Art Farmer and Jim Hall, released on the album Big Blues.
- "Pavane: She's So Fine" (1994) from John's Book of Alleged Dances by John Adams.
- The title of a song from Verehrt und angespien (1999), the second studio album of the folk metal band In Extremo.
- "Pavane (Thoughts of a Septuagenarian)" (2000) by the Esbjörn Svensson Trio.
- The title of a song from Water Forest (2003), an album by Rurutia.
- "A Sad Pavan for These Distracted Times" is part IX of Vladimír Godár's "Querela Pacis" ("Complaint of Peace") oratorio (2010). Thomas Tomkins composed a piece with the same title in 1649. Sir Peter Maxwell Davies composed one also, in 2004. The 'distracted times' refer to the execution of British king Charles I.
- Eric Clapton released an acoustic demo song on his Facebook Page on September 30, 2014: "Pavane for Jay A", as a homage to skateboard pioneer Jay Adams, who died on August 15, 2014, aged 53.

== General and cited references ==
- Apel, Willi (1988). The History of Keyboard Music to 1700. Bloomington: Indiana University Press. ISBN 0-253-32795-4.
- Arbeau, Thoinot (1967). Orchesography, translated by Mary Stewart Evans, with a new introduction and notes by Julia Sutton and a new Labanotation section by Mireille Backer and Julia Sutton. New York: Dover Publications. ISBN 0-486-21745-0.
- Brown, Alan (2001). "Pavan". The New Grove Dictionary of Music and Musicians, second edition, edited by Stanley Sadie and John Tyrrell. London: Macmillan Publishers.
- Horst, Louis (1937). Pre-Classic Dance Forms. A Dance Horizons Book. New York: Dance Observer. Reprinted, Princeton, N.J.: Princeton Book Co., 1987. ISBN 9780916622510.
- Sachs, Curt (1937). World History of the Dance, translated by Bessie Schönberg. New York: W. W. Norton & Co.
