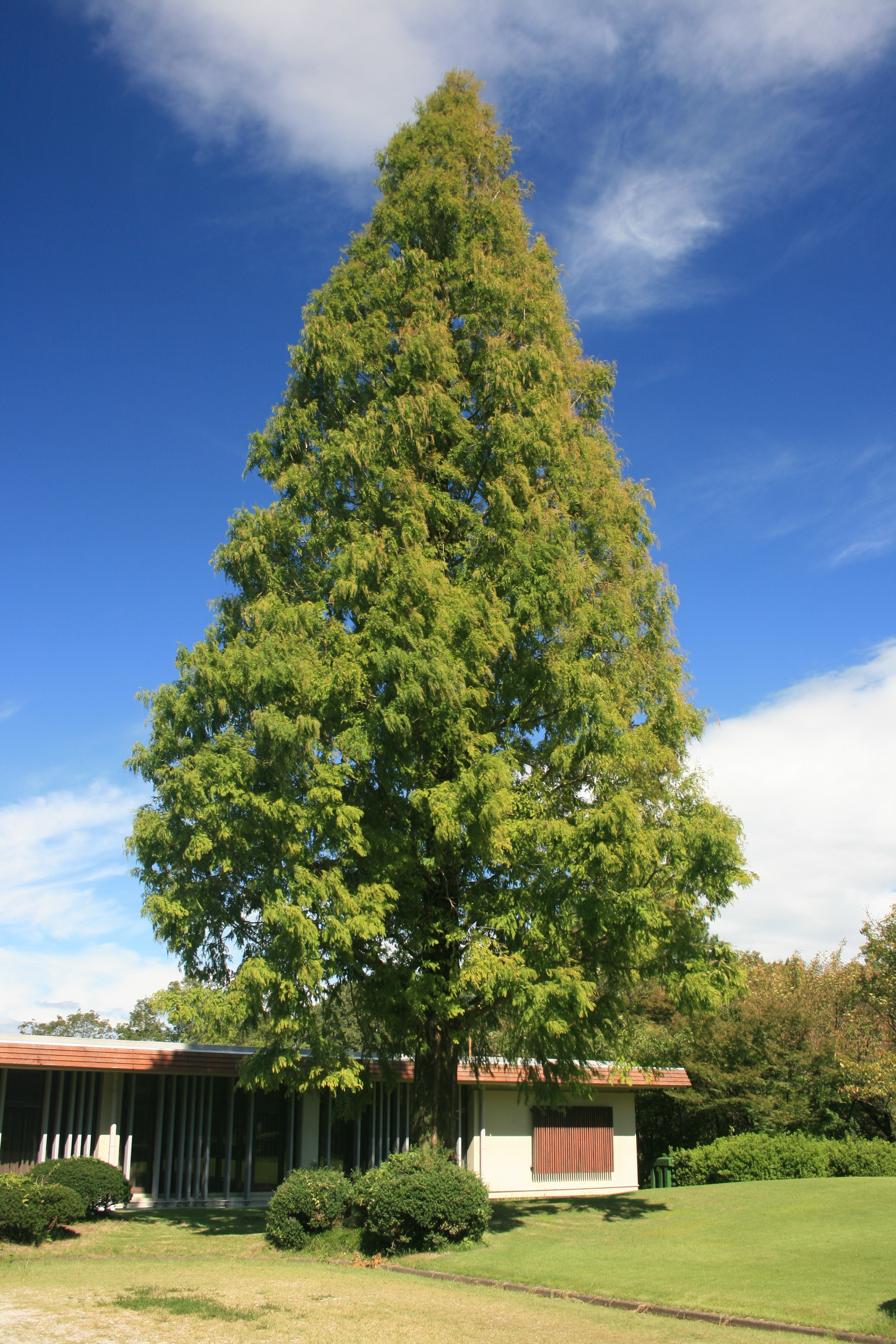

Conservation status
- Endangered (IUCN 3.1)

Scientific classification
- Kingdom: Plantae
- Clade: Tracheophytes
- Clade: Gymnosperms
- Division: Pinophyta
- Class: Pinopsida
- Order: Cupressales
- Family: Cupressaceae
- Genus: Metasequoia
- Species: M. glyptostroboides

Binomial name
- Metasequoia glyptostroboides Hu and W.C.Cheng, 1948

= Metasequoia glyptostroboides =

Metasequoia glyptostroboides Temporal range: Late Pliocene–Present

Species of conifer

Metasequoia glyptostroboides, the dawn redwood, is a fast-growing, endangered deciduous conifer. It is the sole living species of the genus Metasequoia, one of three genera in the subfamily Sequoioideae of the family Cupressaceae. It now survives in the wild only in wet lower slopes and montane river and stream valleys in the border region of Hubei and Hunan provinces and Chongqing municipality in south-central China, notably in Lichuan county in Hubei. Although the shortest of the redwoods, it can grow to 167 ft (51 m) in height.

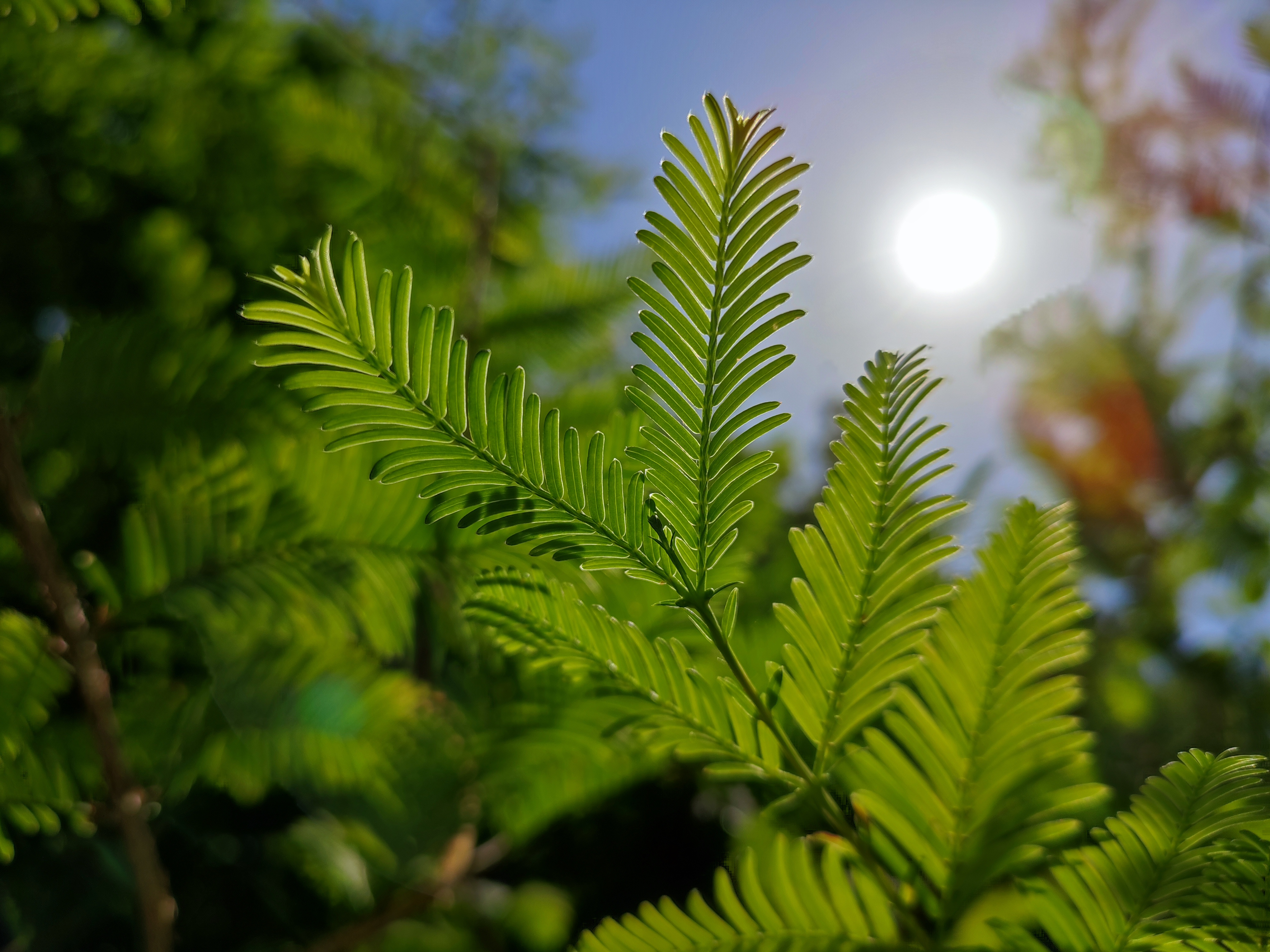
Dawn redwood

In 1941, the genus Metasequoia was reported by paleobotanist Shigeru Miki as a widely distributed extinct genus based on fossils, before attracting considerable attention a few years later when small populations were found alive in central China. It is a well-known example of a living fossil species. Modern dawn redwood appears identical to its late Cretaceous ancestors. The tree faces considerable risks of extinction in its wild range due to deforestation; however, it has been planted extensively in arboreta worldwide, where it has proved a popular and fast-growing ornamental plant. If the species had not been discovered when it was, it might have become extinct before being investigated.

== History ==
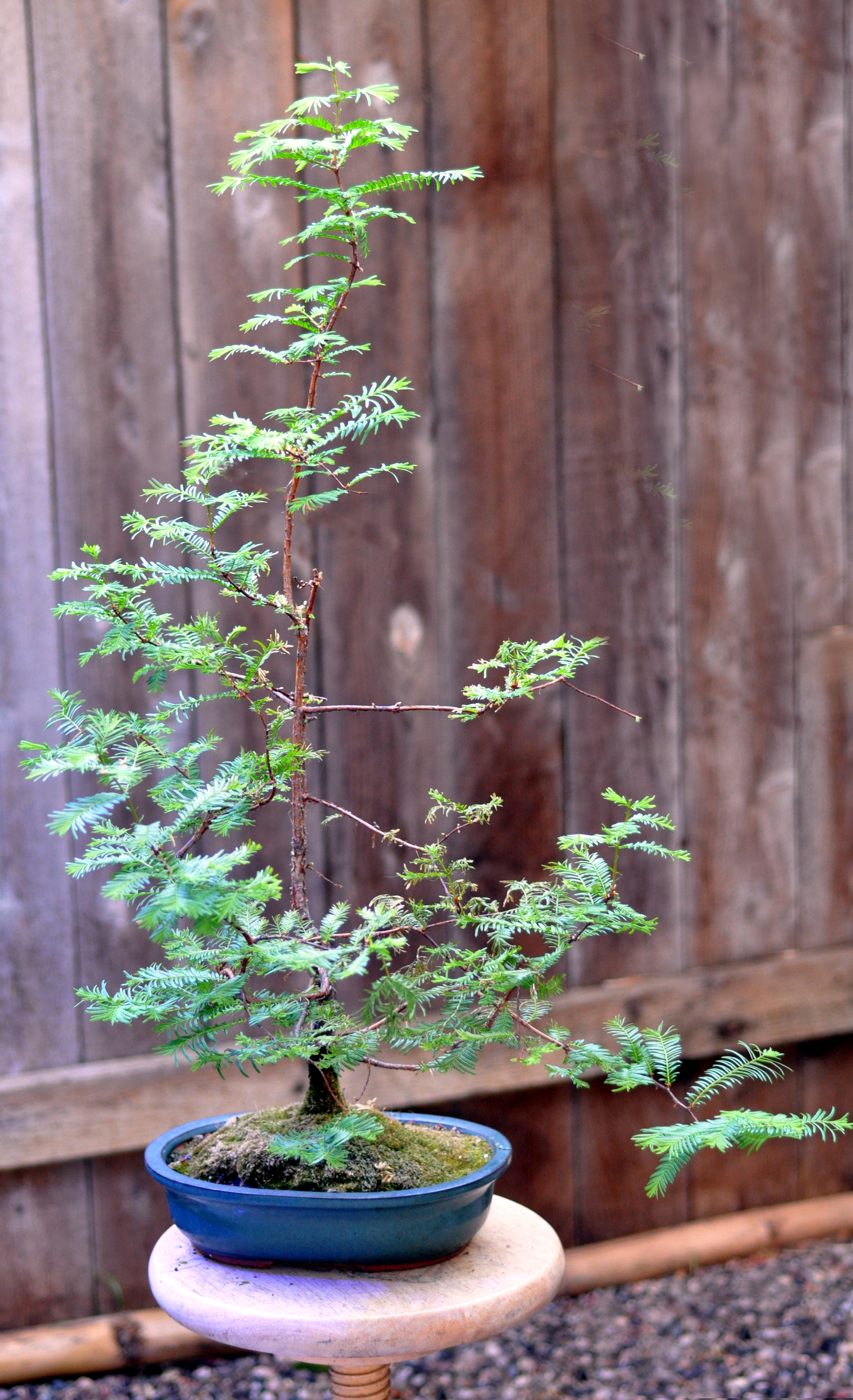
Metasequoia glyptostroboides (dawn redwood) bonsai tree

Although it was commonly known from the fossil record from across the northern hemisphere, the dawn redwood was considered extinct until the mid-twentieth century. When the genus Metasequoia was first described in 1941, it was from Mesozoic Era fossils, none of which were less than 150 million years old. While studying fossil samples of the family Cupressaceae, Dr. Shigeru Miki from Kyoto University identified a divergent leaf form. He realized he had discovered a new genus, which he named Metasequoia, meaning "like a sequoia".

In the same year, Kan Duo (Toh Kan, 1903–1961), professor of Forest Management, National Central University, Chongqing, (formerly Chungking) observed an enormous living specimen while performing a survey in Sichuan and Hubei provinces. Though unaware of Miki's new genus, he recognized the unique traits of the tree. Unfortunately, while he collected some plant material, he did not attempt to identify or publish his findings. This tree formed part of a local shrine, where villagers called it 水杉 (Shuǐshān or "water fir"). Shuǐshān continues to be the common name of dawn redwood in Chinese.

In 1943, Wang Zhan (Chan Wang, 1911–2000) of the National Bureau of Forest Research, the Ministry of Agriculture and Forests, Chongqing, collected samples from an unidentified tree in the village of Moudao (formerly Motaochi, Maodaoqi or Modaoxi) in Lichuan County, Hubei province—now believed to be the same tree Kan discovered. The samples were determined to belong to a tree yet unknown to science, but World War II postponed further study.

Professors Zheng Wanjun (Cheng Wan-Chun) and Hu Xiansu (Hu Hsen-Hsu) made the pivotal connection between Miki's fossil genus and the living samples in 1946. The name Metasequoia viva was initially used, but was eventually changed to the specific epithet "glyptostroboides", after its resemblance to the Chinese swamp cypress (Glyptostrobus).

In July 1947, the Arnold Arboretum of Harvard University provided $250 to fund an expedition by Zheng Wanjun's assistant Hua Jingchan (Ching-Shan Hwa 1921–present) to collect seeds for the arboretum from the Metasequoia type tree in Moudao, and trees in the nearby Metasequoia Valley (Shuishaba Valley). Hua's collecting trip returned with several kilos of seed that were distributed over the next few months for growth trials to Chinese institutions, the Arnold Arboretum, Missouri Botanic Garden, and elsewhere in the United States, botanic gardens at Kew, Edinburgh, and other locations in the United Kingdom; as well as botanic gardens in continental Europe and worldwide.

== Description ==
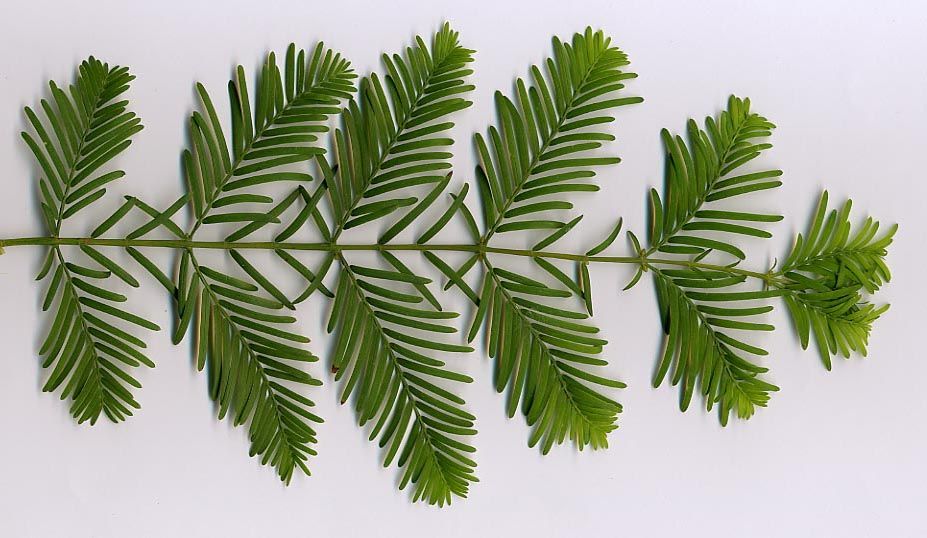
Dawn redwood foliage – note opposite arrangement

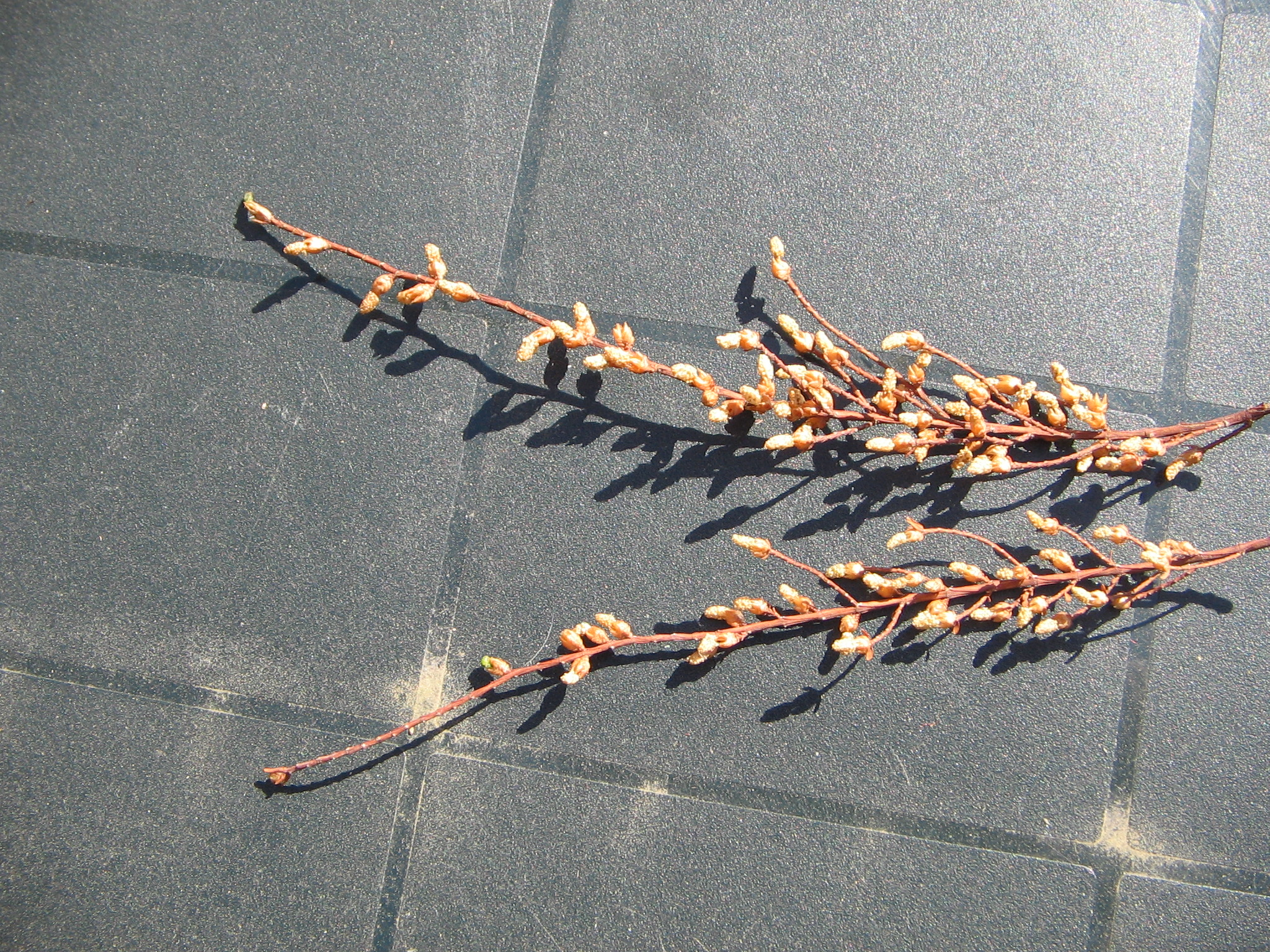
Pollen bearing cones

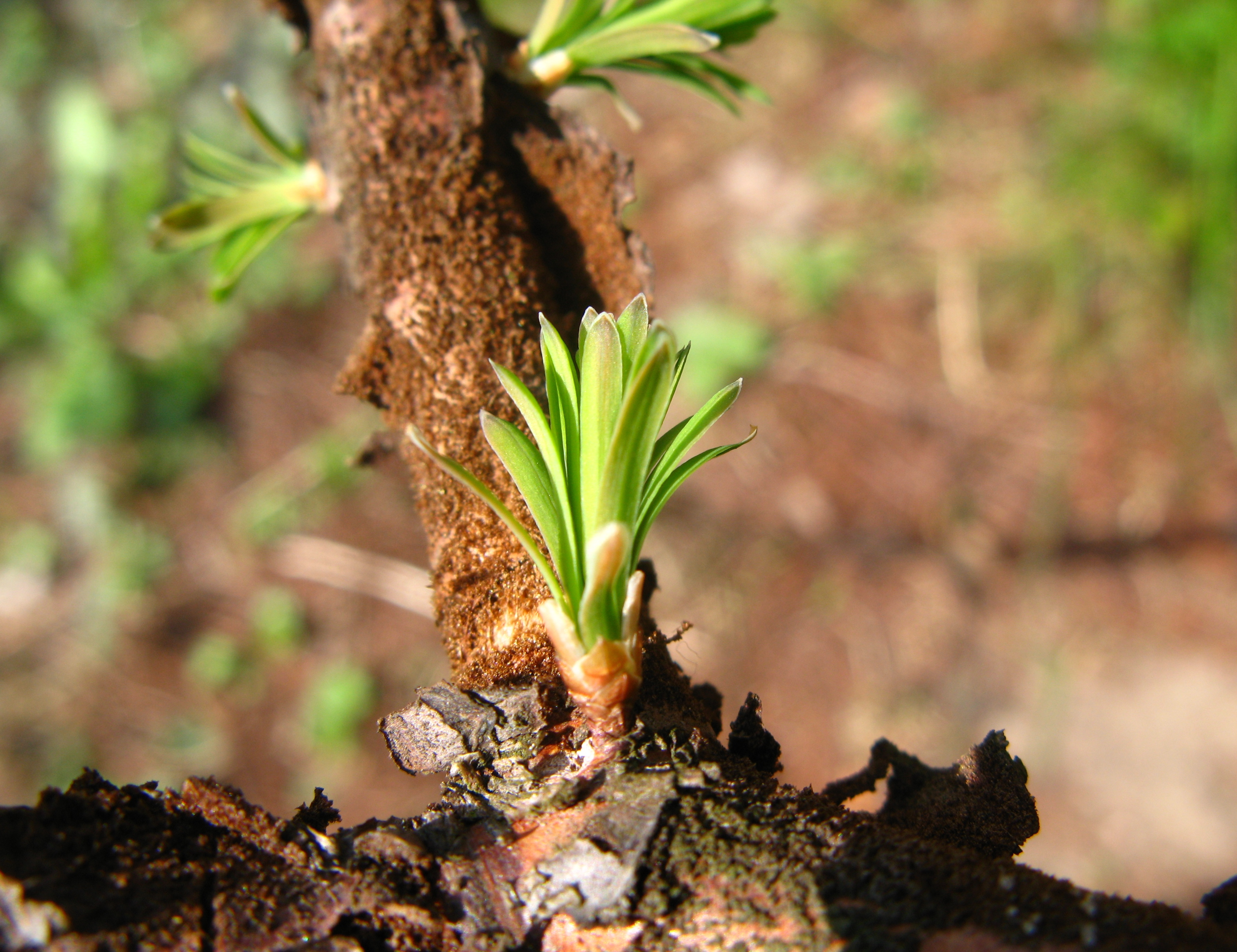
Young leaves

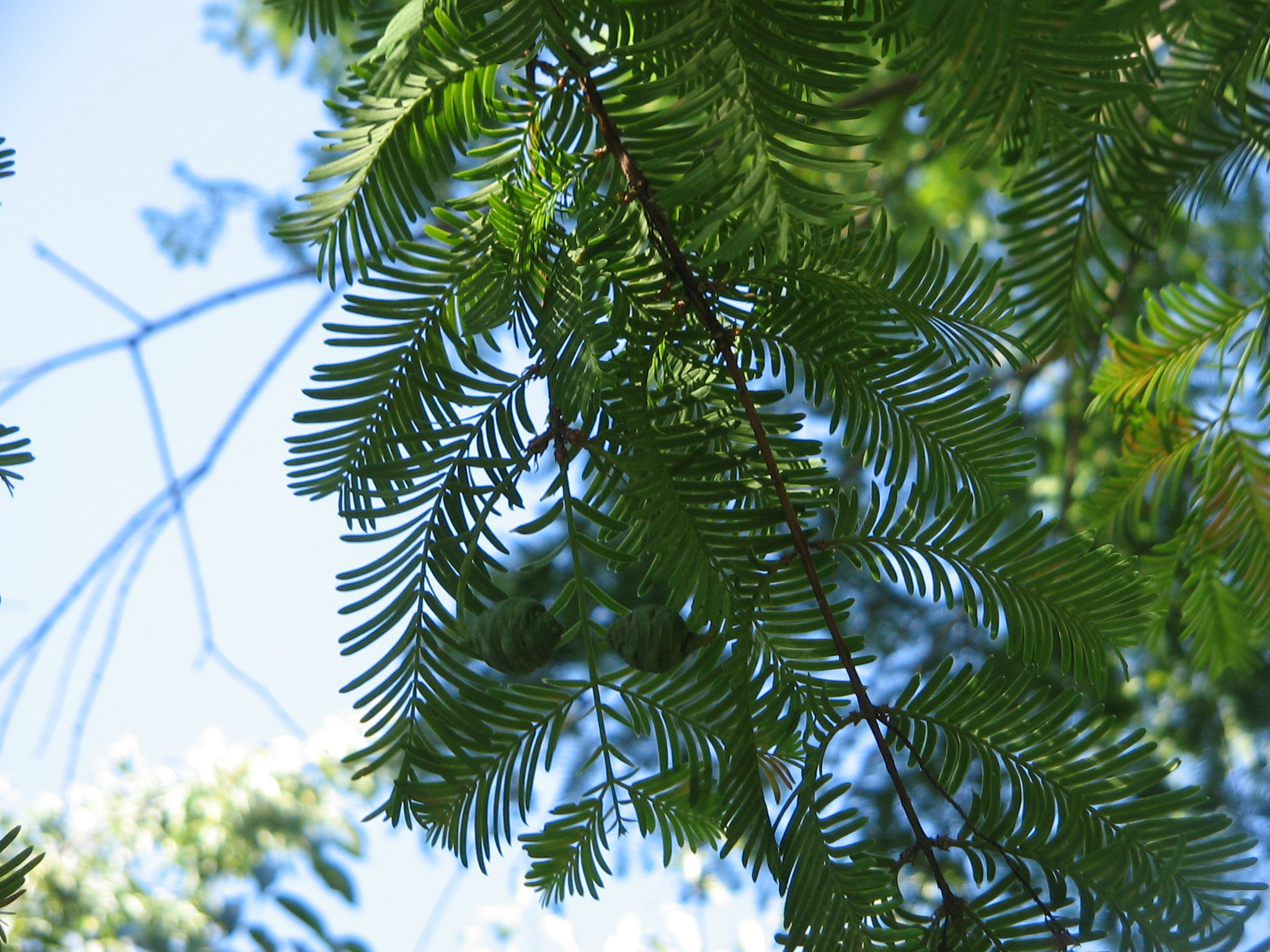
Young seed bearing cones

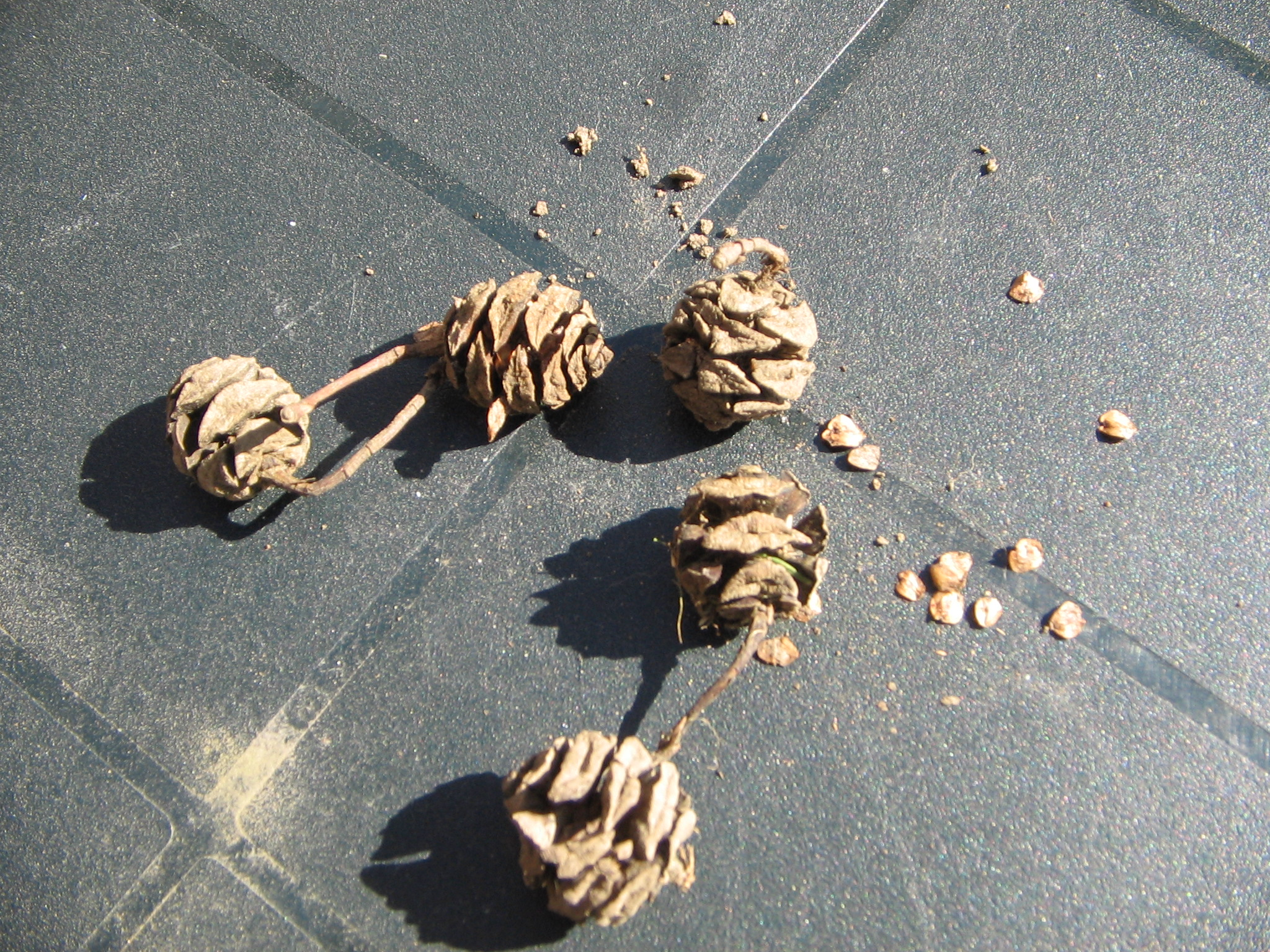
Mature seed bearing cones

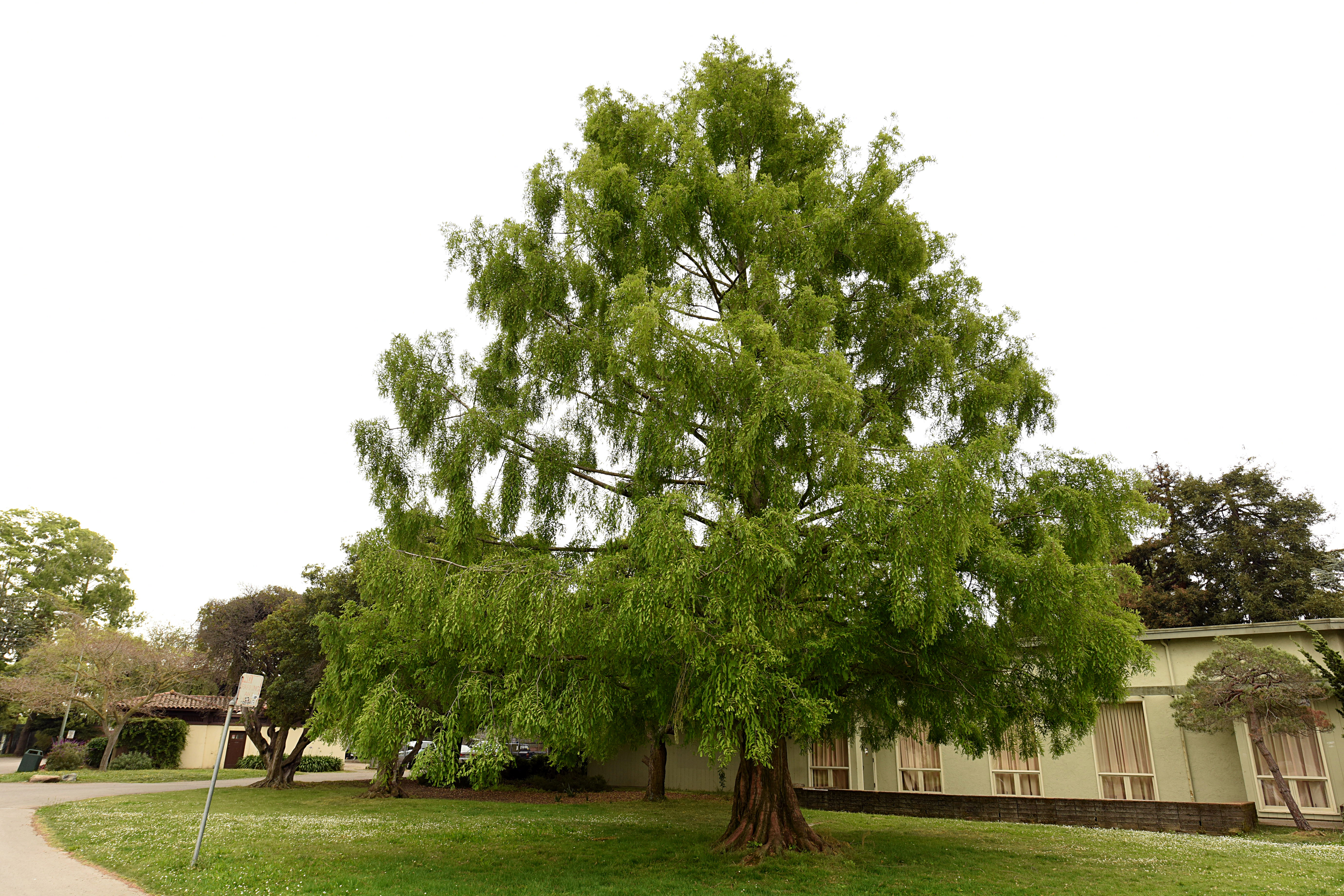
Mature tree

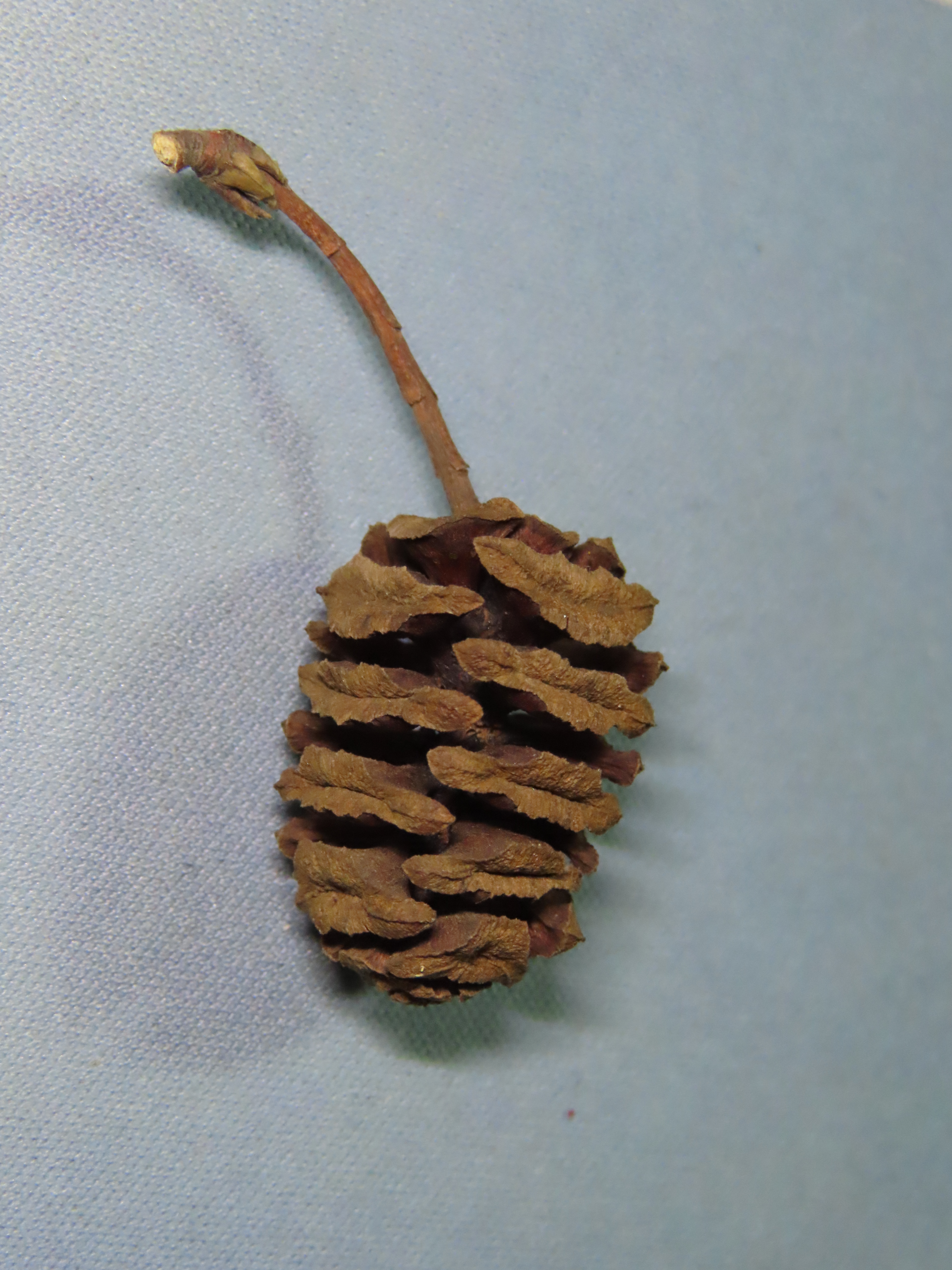
Cone

Metasequoia glyptostroboides leaves are opposite, 1–3 cm (0.39–1.18 in) long, and bright fresh green, turning a foxy reddish brown in autumn. The pollen cones are 5–6 mm (0.20–0.24 in) long, produced on long spikes in early spring; they are produced only on trees growing in regions with hot summers. The cones are globose to ovoid, 1.5–2.5 cm (0.59–0.98 in) in diameter with 16–28 scales arranged in opposite pairs in four rows, each pair at right angles to the adjacent pair; they mature in about 8–9 months after pollination.

While the bark and foliage are similar to another closely related genus of redwoods, Sequoia, M. glyptostroboides differs from the coast redwood in that it is deciduous, like Taxodium distichum (bald cypress). Similar to T. distichum, older trees may form wide buttresses on the lower trunk. M. glyptostroboides is a fast-growing tree, exceeding 35 m (115 ft) in height and 1 m (3.3 ft) in trunk diameter by the age of 50, in cultivation (with the potential to grow to even greater dimensions). The trunk forms a distinctive "armpit" under each branch. The bark is vertically fissured and tends to exfoliate in ribbon-like strips.

The largest dawn redwood recorded was an isolated specimen in China about 50 meters (160 feet) tall and 2.2 meters (7.2 feet) wide. This tree was killed by a lightning strike in 1951. Several dawn redwoods of this height still live in the eastern part of Metasequoia Valley, where the tree was discovered. The tree's true potential size is much larger, as logs up to 8 meters (26 feet) wide at the base have been discovered in rice paddies.

The thickest and tallest dawn redwoods listed by Monumental Trees are both at Longwood Gardens, outside Kennett Square, Pennsylvania, United States. The widest has a girth at breast height of 5.79 m (19.0 ft), average diameter 1.84 m (6.0 ft), and is 30.18 m (99.0 ft) tall. The tallest is 41.15 m (135.0 ft) tall, and has a girth at breast height of 3.35 m (11.0 ft), average diameter 1.07 m (3.5 ft). Both trees were planted in 1948 and measured in 2018.

=== Ecotypic variation ===
Ecotypic variation has developed in a variety of microhabitats. Three variations have been observed based on the size of their cones, large, medium, and small. The large cone type is found growing on mountain slopes, develops a broad canopy, seeds more readily and is more drought tolerant. The small cone type is found near stream banks, is more sensitive to drought, and develops a more uniform trunk.

Ecological Type	Large cone	Medium cone	Small cone
Growth Rate	fast	medium	slow
Ecological preference	mountain slope, drought tolerant	mountain slope, medium drought tolerance	ditches and creeks, drought intolerant
Bark Thickness	thick	medium	thin
Bark Color	gray	brownish gray	brown
Stem Furrow	distinct	very distinct	indistinct
Leaf Color	yellowish green	green	dark green
Leaf Density	low	medium	high
Branch Canopy	wide	medium	narrow
Branch Distribution	sparse	medium	dense
Branch Angle	>90	medium	<50
Cone Size	2.2 x 2.0 cm	2.0 x 1.8 cm	1.5 x 1.4 cm
Number of seeds per 500 grams	128	161	280
Number of seeds per cone	106	85	62
Seed size	0.6 x 0.5 cm	0.53 x 0.48 cm	0.48 x 0.42 cm
Weight in grams per 1000 seeds	2.96	2.84	2.40
Seed germination rate (%)	15	21	18

== Related species ==
Together with Sequoia sempervirens (coast redwood) and Sequoiadendron giganteum (giant sequoia) of California, M. glyptostroboides is classified in the subfamily Sequoioideae of the family Cupressaceae. Although it is the only living species in its genus, three fossil species are known as well. The other Sequoioideae and several other genera have been transferred from the Taxodiaceae to the Cupressaceae based on DNA analysis.

== Conservation ==
Studies carried out between 2007 and 2009 counted 5,371 trees primarily in Lichuan, Hubei, with much smaller groups in Shizhu, Chongqing and Longshan, Hunan.

The floodplain of Metasequoia Valley in Hubei had already been turned to rice paddies by the time of the tree's discovery, but was once probably a more extensive dawn redwood forest. Such a forest would have been similar to bald cypress forests in the United States, with many similar species growing in association. Nearly 3,000 trunks were found in the floor of the valley, ranging from 2 to 8 meters (6.6 to 26.2 feet) wide at the base. Additionally, houses made of Metasequoia wood 200–300 years old still exist and probably date back to the original settlement of the valley.

Since its discovery, the dawn redwood has become something of a national point of pride, and it is protected under Chinese law and also planted widely. However, it is still listed as endangered in the wild. Cutting of trees or branches is illegal, but the demand for seedlings drives cone collection to the point that natural reproduction is no longer occurring in the dawn redwood forest. In addition, the landscape has been highly modified by human use, and a 1980 expedition found that the habitat has significantly degraded since the tree's discovery. Most of the other vegetation has been cut, and most of the area is no longer suitable ground for seedlings. Between 1950 and 1980 several hundred were logged in Metasequoia Valley, some over 2 meters (6.6 feet) wide.

A survey in the 2000s counted and measured all wild dawn redwoods. The remaining healthy trees range from 25 cm (9.8 in) to 1.65 m (5.4 ft) wide at breast height, 12–51 m (39–167 ft) in height, and estimated 41–265 years in age. The average size was 27 m (89 ft) tall and 0.45–0.9 m (1.5–3.0 ft) wide at breast height, with an estimated age of about 95 years. (The type tree, 2.48 m (8.1 ft) at breast height, was in poor health and therefore excluded from the study) No seedlings were found, and if they ever do appear it is legal to remove and transplant them. The species will continue to live in yards, parks and on roadsides all over China, but the M. glyptostroboides forest ecosystem could disappear when its mature trees die.

== Cultivation ==
Since the tree's rediscovery, the dawn redwood has become a popular ornamental tree in parks and gardens worldwide.

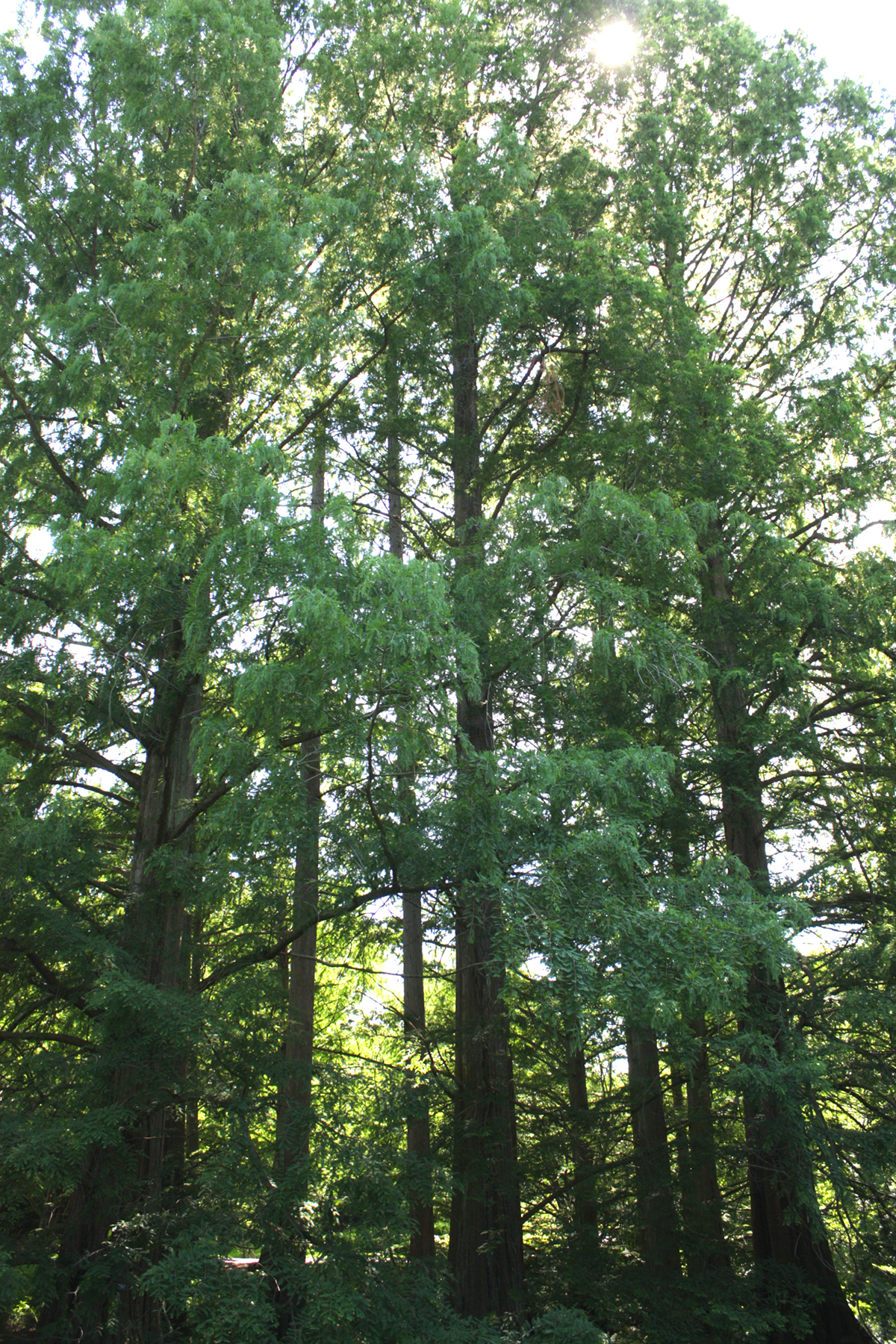
Grove of dawn redwoods in the Morris Arboretum, Philadelphia

Dawn redwood seed arrived at the Arnold Arboretum on January 5, 1948, and was shipped to arboreta around the world soon after. By 1951, the species had entered the commercial horticultural trade in the United States, and following media excitement about the new discovery, including in the San Francisco Chronicle of March 25, 1948, sales soon took off.

Dawn redwood has proved an easy tree to grow in temperate regions, and is now widely planted as an ornamental tree. Planted trees have already reached at least up to 1.84 meters (6.0 feet) in diameter at breast height and 41.15 meters (135.0 feet) tall, despite being in cultivation for only 70 years. This rapid rate of growth has led to consideration for using the tree in forestry plantations. It has been discovered that M. glyptostroboides will thrive in standing water, much like bald cypress, and if left branched to the ground in full sun, will develop the large, contorted boles that have made bald cypress famous. Limbing or pruning at an early age will prohibit this formation later on.

In cultivation, M. glyptostroboides is hardy to USDA Zone 5, making it hardy down to lows of −25 °F (−32 °C). It is tolerant of soggy, waterlogged soils; in the wild it is adapted to growing on flood plains. Until it is established in a specific site, it is vulnerable to drought and inadequate water availability. The dawn redwood is recommended for urban areas in the Midwest, Southeast, and East Coast of North America, as its fast growth rate and tolerance for air pollution make it adaptable and able to thrive where other species might suffer. The species tends to struggle without irrigation in arid climates such as the American West unless planted directly on or adjacent to a body of water such as a pond or stream. This species is also highly susceptible to damage from contact with heavy amounts of winter de-icing salt.

In the 1980s, it was discovered that many of the second-generation trees in cultivation suffered from inbreeding depression (extremely low genetic variability), which could lead to increased susceptibility to disease and reproductive failure. Many sources claim that the original 1947 seedlots came from as few as one tree; however, this has proven to be false. The original seeds did have a wide range of source trees, and the inbreeding depression is more likely to come from self-pollination by isolated trees. However, the total cultivated population still had less genetic variation than the wild ones, and more widespread seed-collecting expeditions in China in the 1990s sought to resolve this problem and restore genetic diversity to cultivated M. glyptostroboides.

=== In China ===
Pizhou, Jiangsu has the longest dawn redwood avenue in the world. The avenue is 47 km long and is lined with trees on its entire length. In total, the city has around five million trees along 400 km of streets. The Water Forest in Xinghua, Jiangsu is named after the many dawn redwood trees found there in the park.

There is a large collection of dawn redwood in the Lushan Botanical Garden within Mount Lu, Jiangxi.

=== In the United Kingdom ===
The dawn redwood is frequently encountered across the UK. Growth has been fastest in the south-east, but it is believed the tree may have a longer future in the more humid western regions. The first dawn redwood to be planted in the UK was at the Cambridge University Botanic Garden. The seed was not from the Arnold expedition, but came to Cambridge directly. The Botanic Garden's Annual Report for 1949 declares: 'Seeds of Metasequoia glyptostroboides, sent by Dr Silow from China to Professor F T Brooks, germinated freely. Three of the seedlings have been planted out: one in the Yard at the back of the Range and two beside the Pond (now called the Lake).' The tree on the south-west side of the Lake is still living, as at July 2019. Seed distributed in the 1940s to Hillier Gardens near Winchester, UK, have thrived and are now the emblem of the gardens. A sapling planted in Stratford Park, Stroud in 1953 to commemorate the coronation of Queen Elizabeth II is now a large tree. The TROBI Champions are at Woking Park, Surrey: 22 m height by 144 cm d.b.h, Clare College, Cambridge: 21 m × 129 cm (planted 1949), and Wayford Woods, Somerset: 32 m × 99 cm. Several cultivars are available providing a range of different foliage colours and textures. The cultivar 'Golden Oji' has gained the Royal Horticultural Society's Award of Garden Merit.

=== In the United States ===
Dawn redwoods thrive over a large, crescent-shaped region that encompasses the eastern and southern United States, as well as on the West Coast. Many institutions, such as the Arnold Arboretum of Harvard University, have fine specimens. The H. H. Hunnewell estate in Wellesley, Massachusetts, has two specimens (numbers 29 and 34) that date to the initial distribution of seed by the Arnold Arboretum in 1949. There is a small grove of dawn redwoods at Bailey Arboretum in Locust Valley, New York, including one tree which is claimed to be the world's largest by diameter. The New York City Department of Parks and Recreation has begun planting dawn redwoods on sidewalks throughout Manhattan and Brooklyn, this link maps them. Washington, D.C.'s Urban Forestry Division has planted hundreds throughout that city, including all of the street trees in the 1800 block of Redwood Terrace, NW. A dawn redwood grows outside of the Rosicrucian Research Library at Rosicrucian Park in San Jose, California, as a memorial to H. Spencer Lewis. It was planted in 1950 from a seedling from the lot brought from China by Dr. Ralph Chaney, and donated by an unnamed donor to H. Spencer Lewis's widow for this purpose. Additionally in San Jose, a dawn redwood is planted at San Jose State University. The Mildred E. Mathias Botanical Garden on the UCLA campus includes a dawn redwood. In North Carolina, a private endeavor is working to create a Metasequoia reserve on 50 acres of uplands in the Sauratown Mountains. Portland, Oregon, is home to some of the oldest dawn redwoods in the U.S. One specimen planted in the Hoyt Arboretum in 1948 was 103' tall at last measurement and in 1952 earned the distinction of being the first dawn redwood to bear cones in the Western Hemisphere in 6–8 million years. A dawn redwood was planted at Southern Illinois University Carbondale in Carbondale, Illinois by William Marberry in 1950 and remains there.

In 2005, Oregon made dawn redwood the state fossil.

== Gallery ==
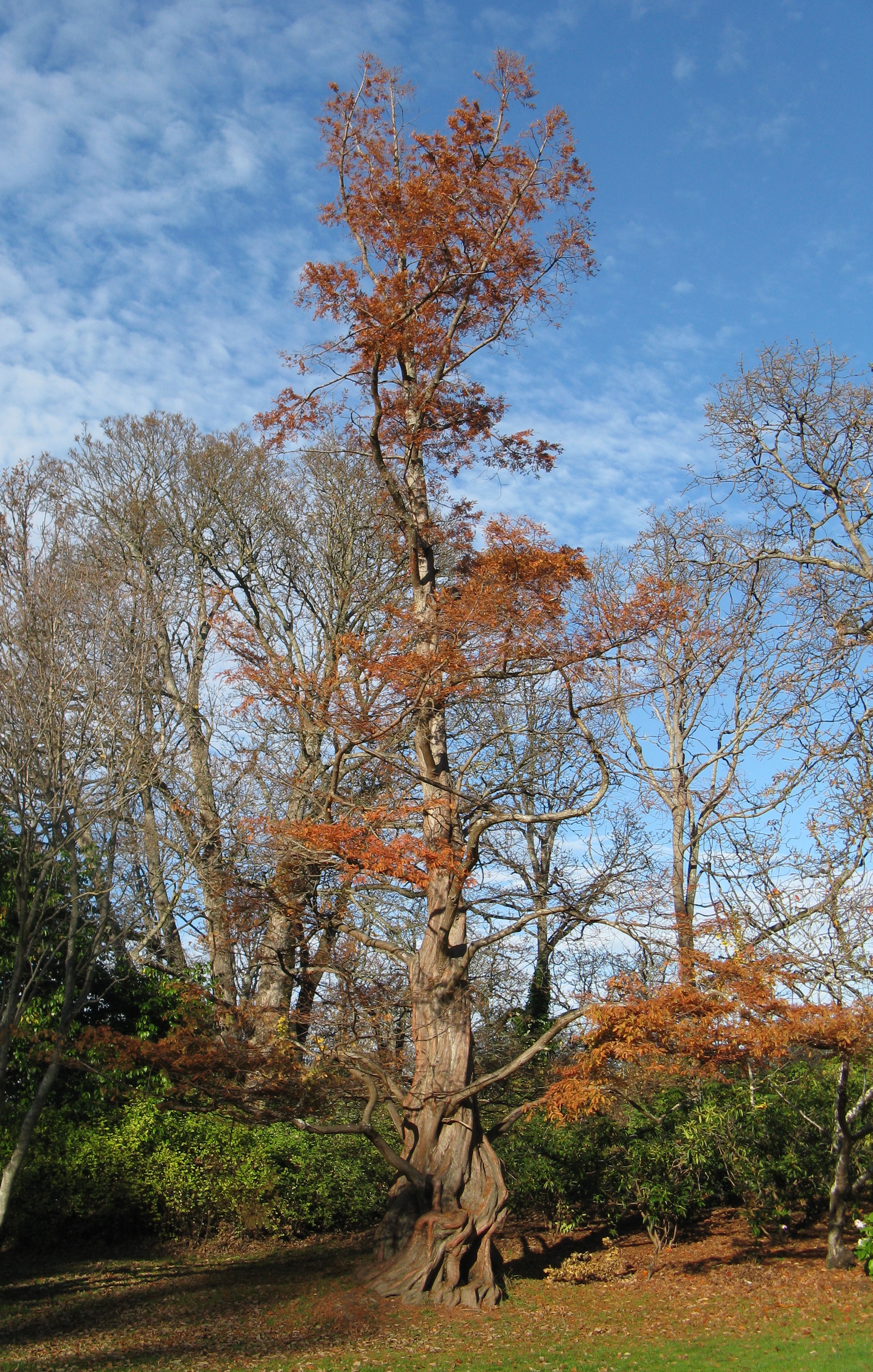
Displaying autumn foliage in Victoria, British Columbia, Canada

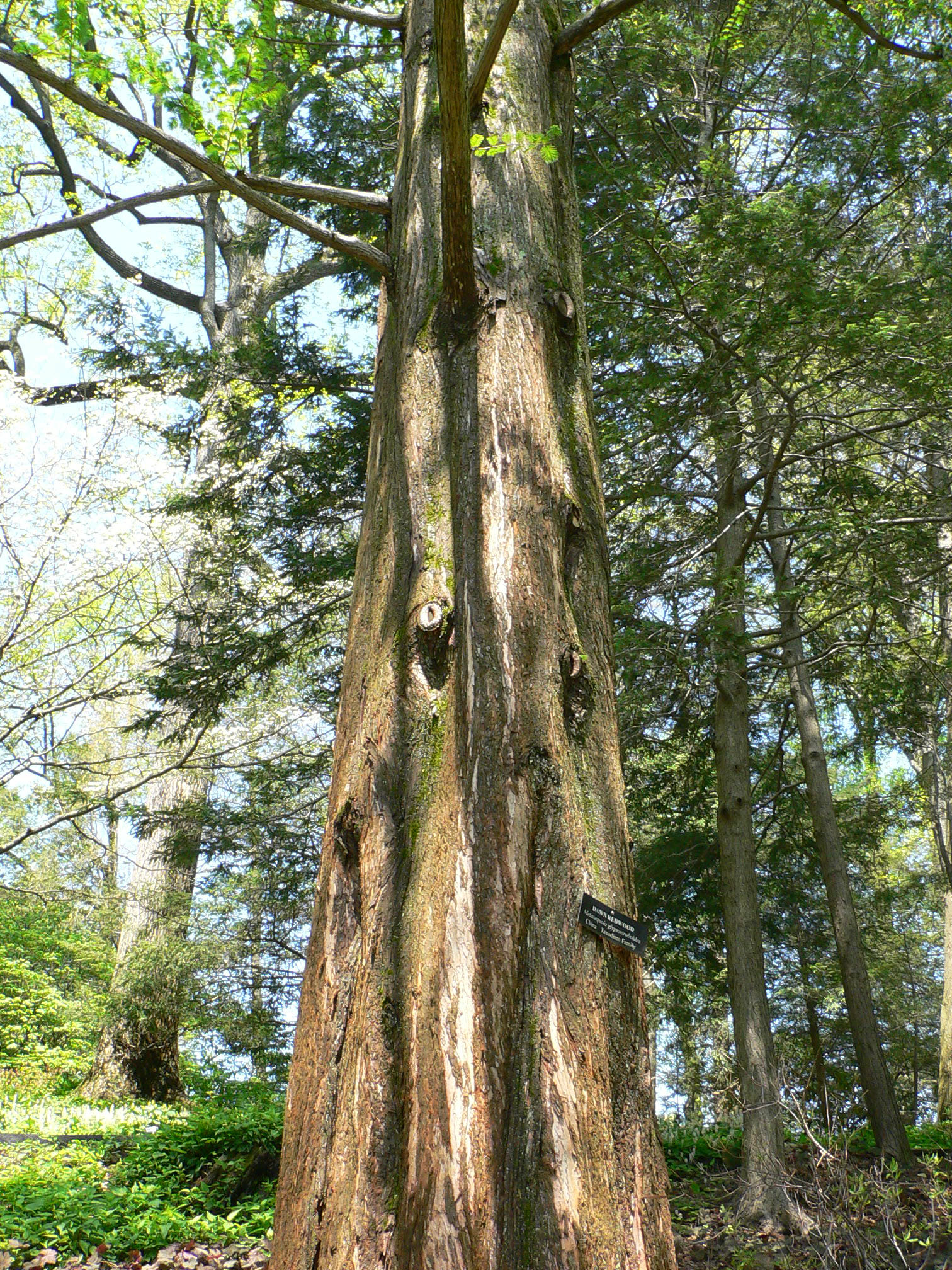
The trunk of an adult tree

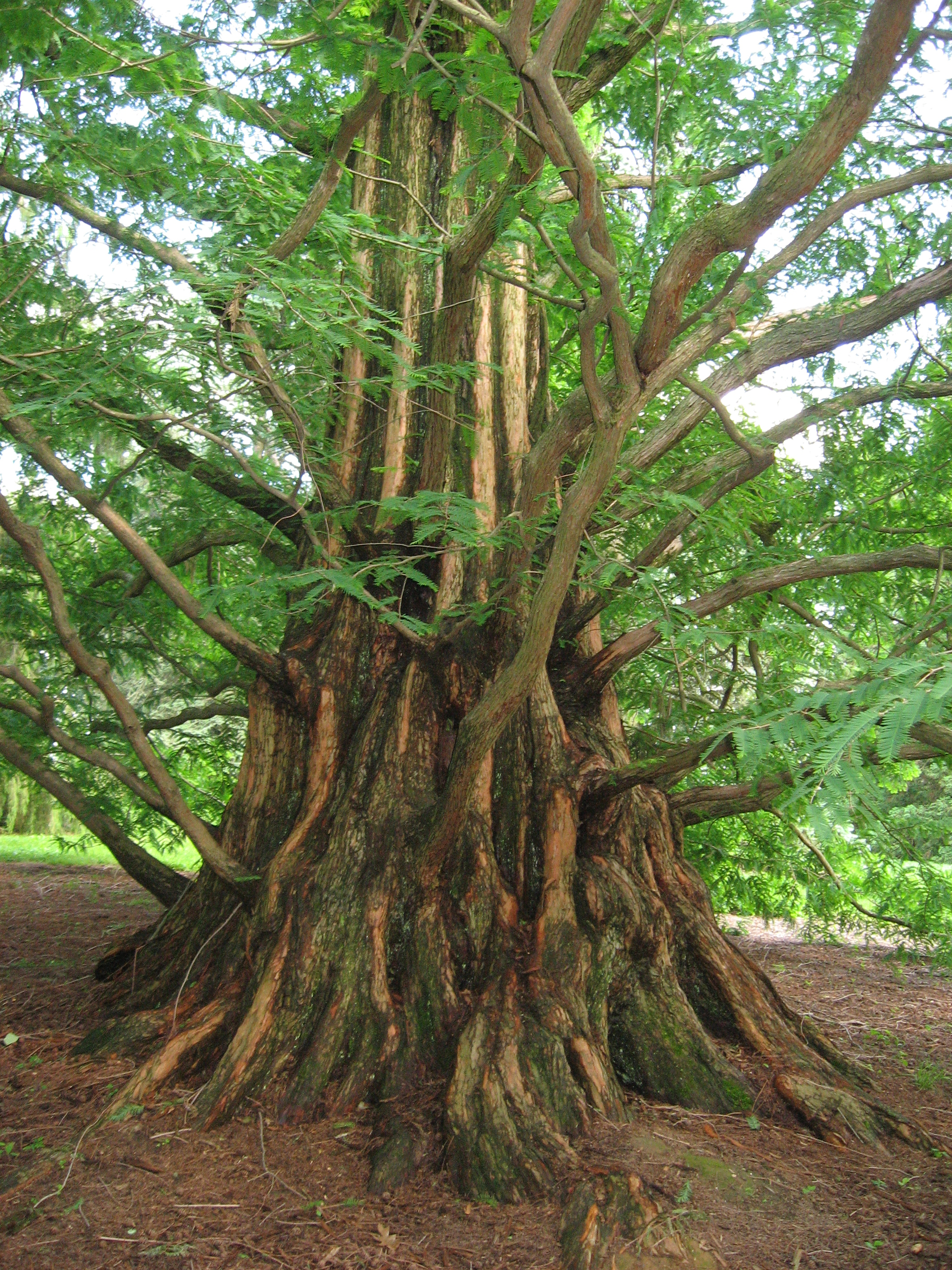
The buttressed base of the trunk

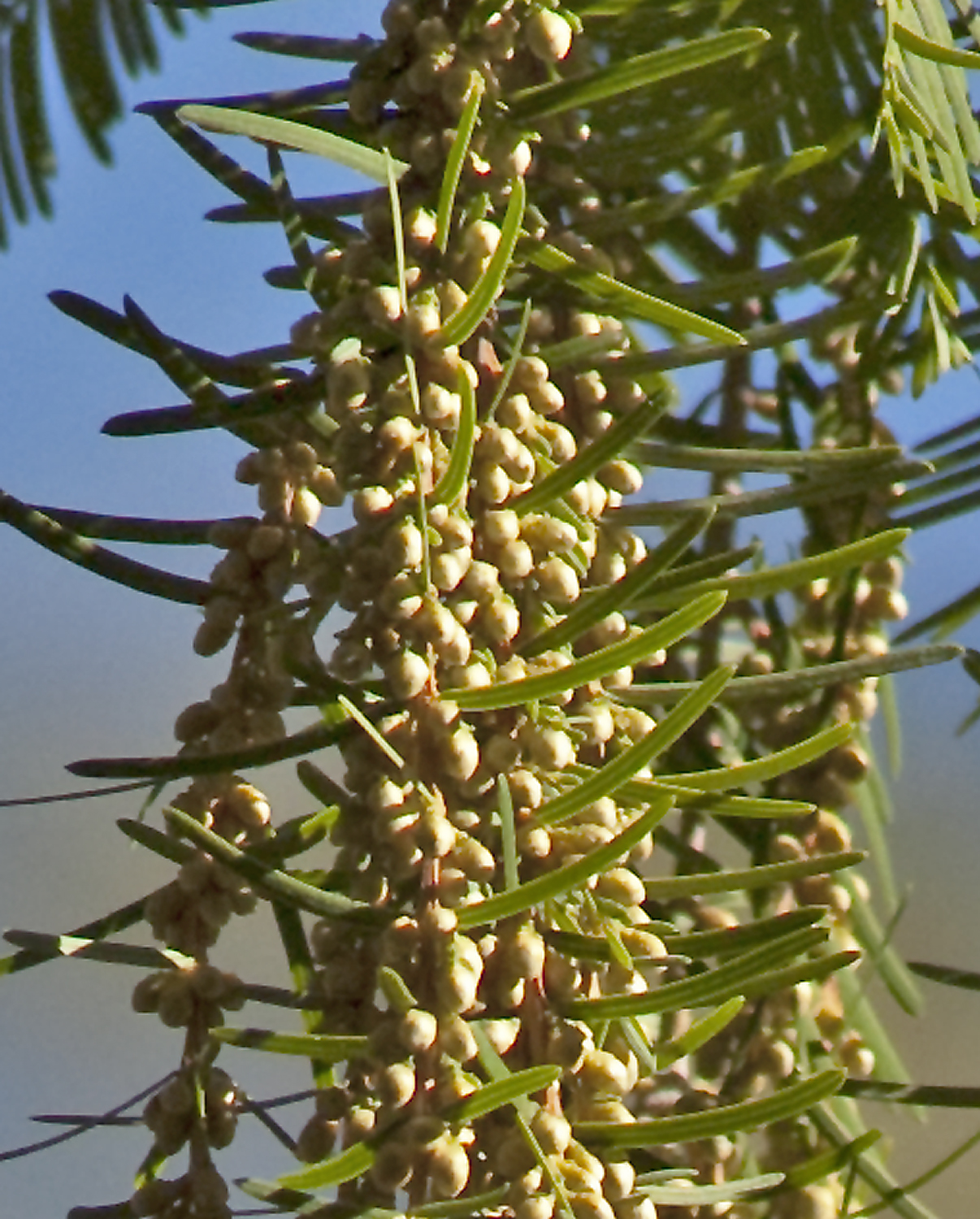
Pollen (or "male") cones

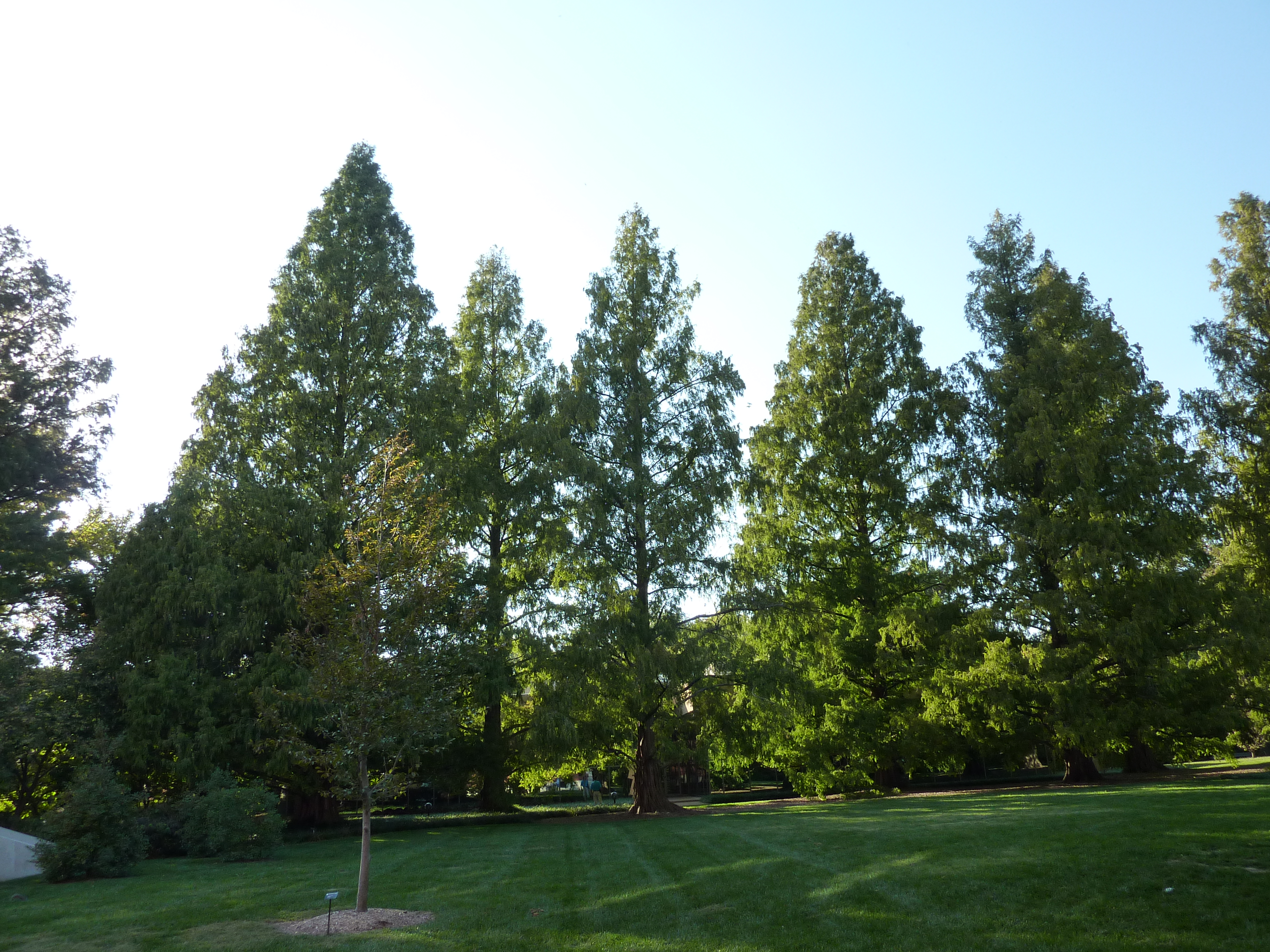
Row of Metasequoia glyptostroboides in the Missouri Botanical Garden.

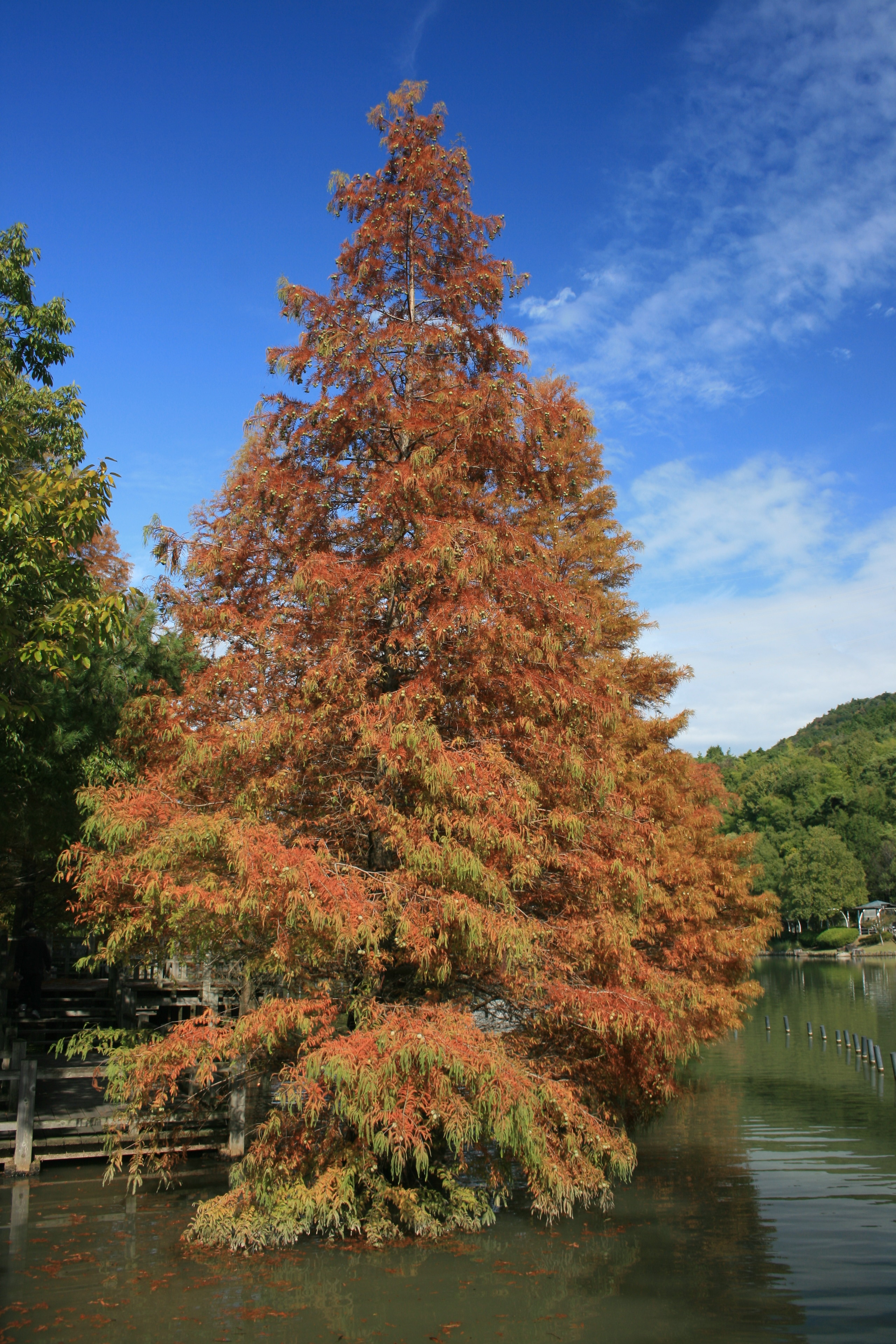
Metasequoia glyptostroboides Autumn leaf color

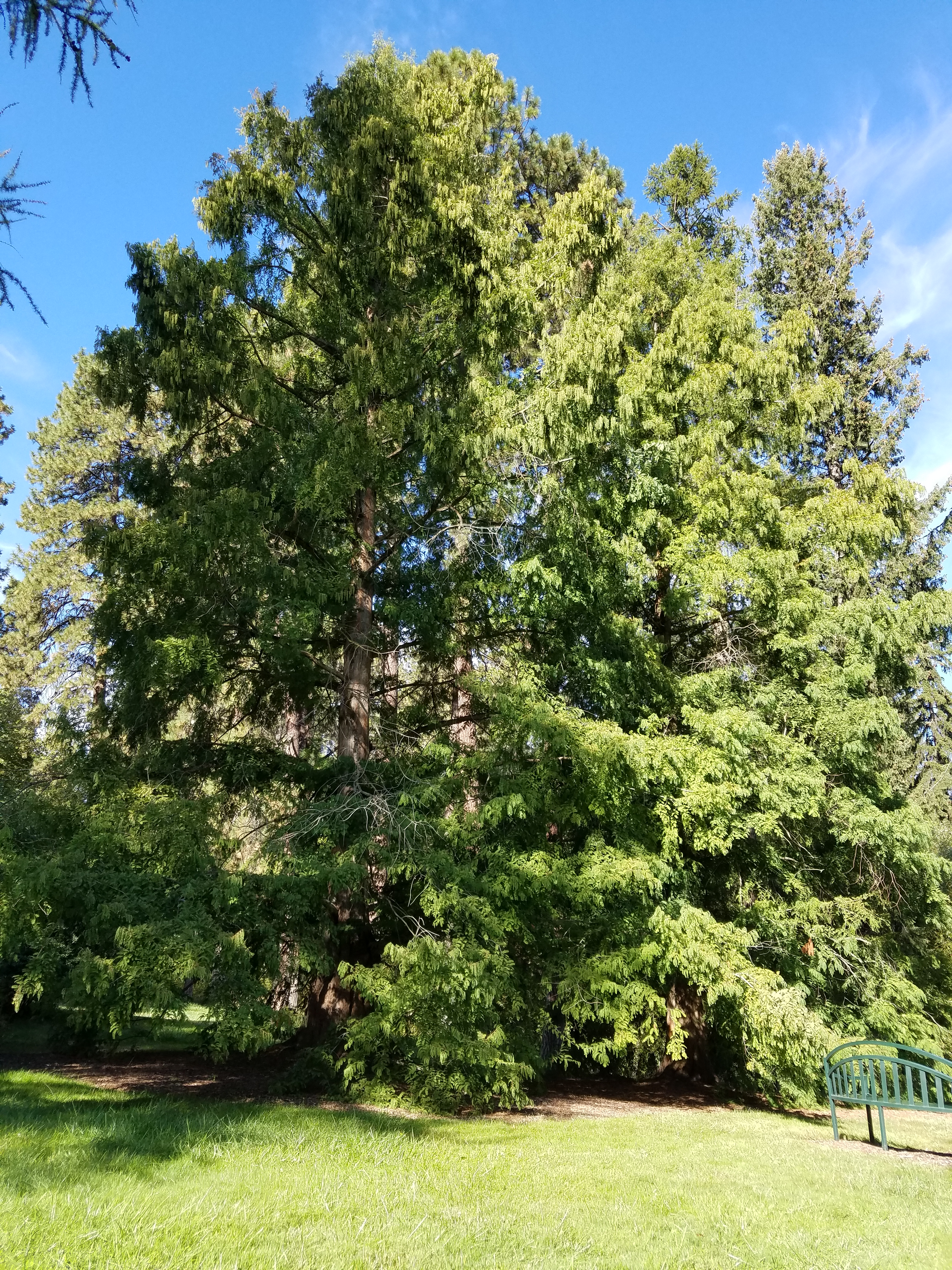
Dawn redwoods in Spokane, WA

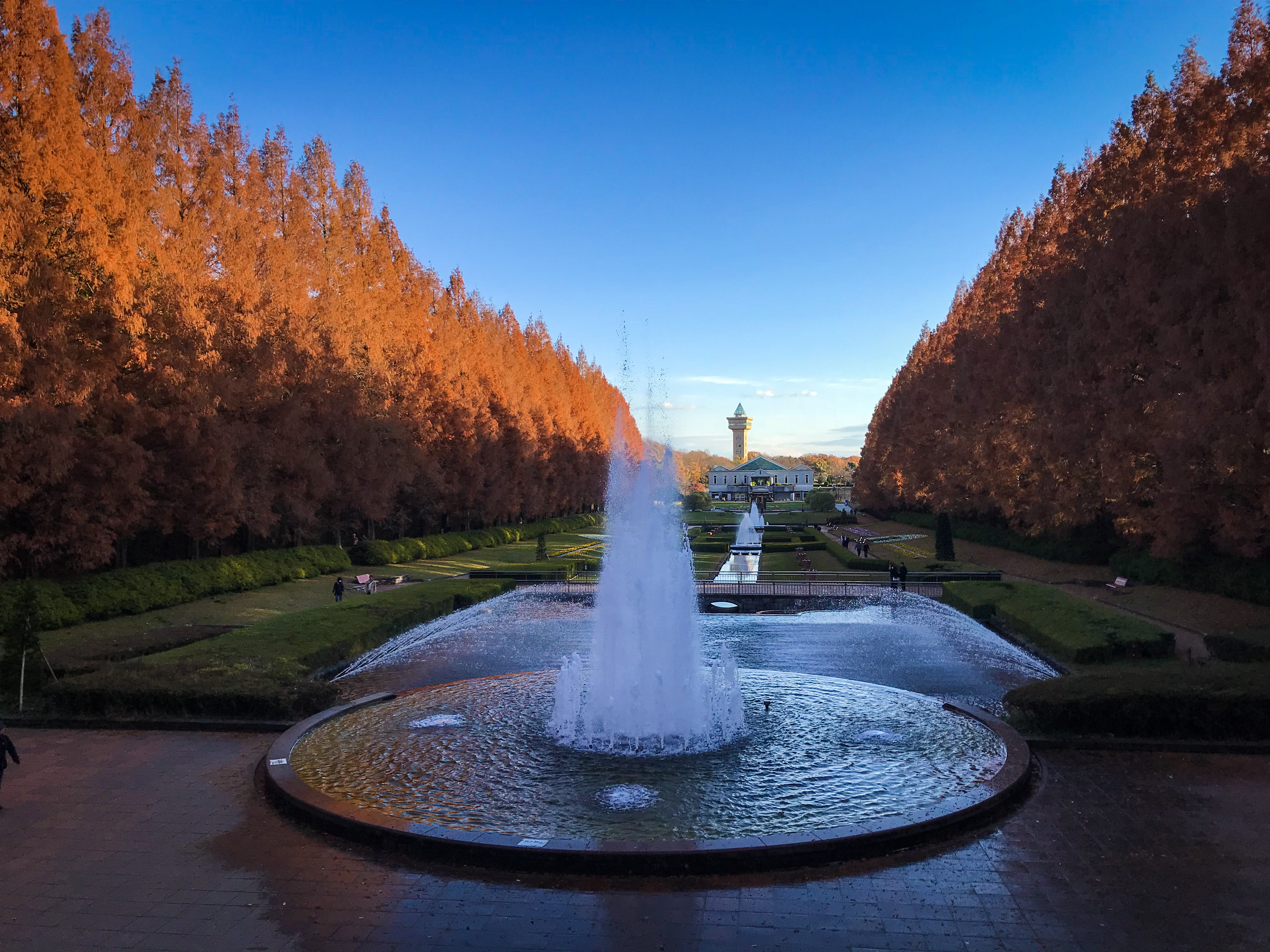
Metasequoia glyptostroboides in Sagamihara Park

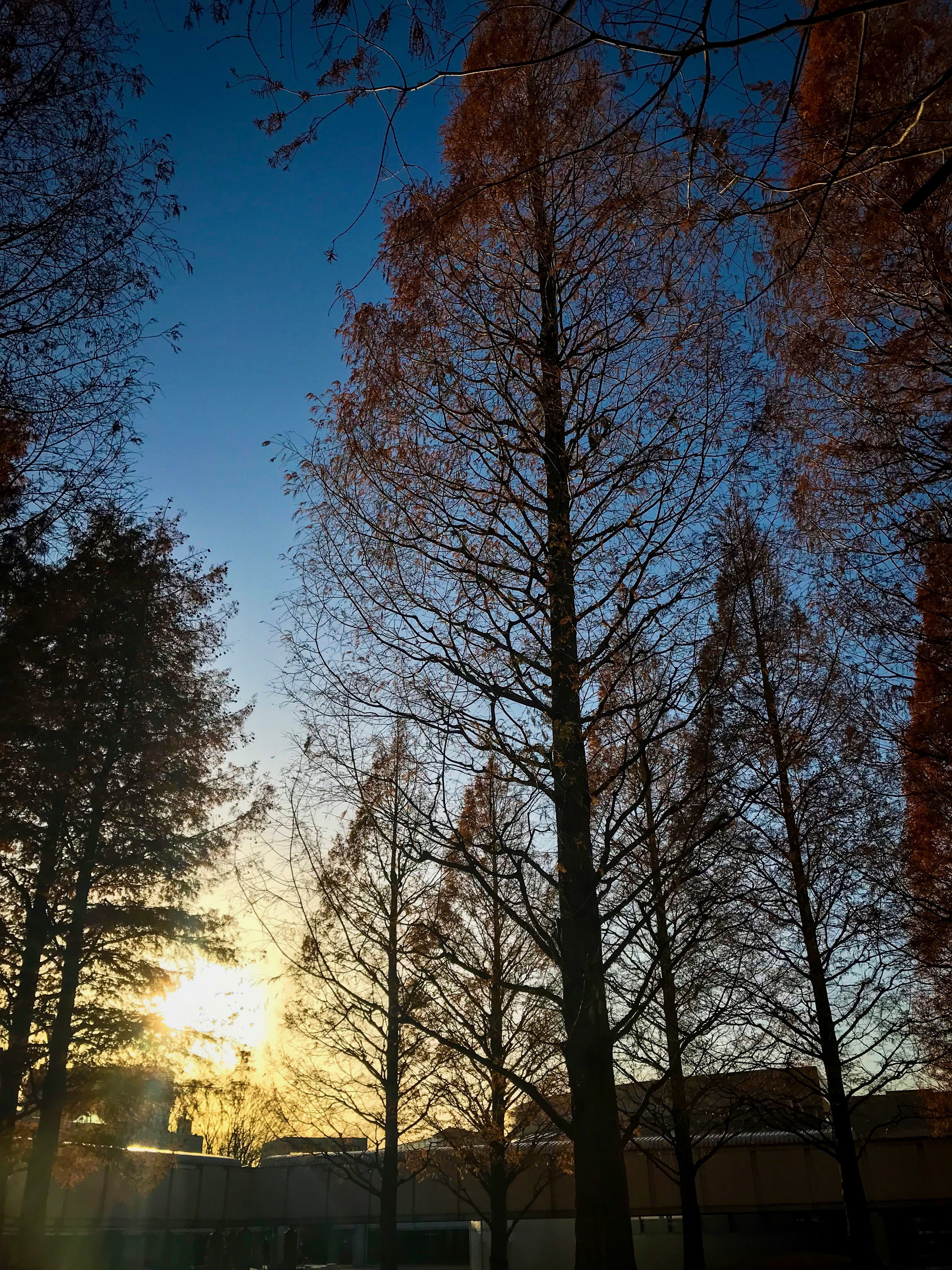
Contour of Metasequoia glyptostroboides

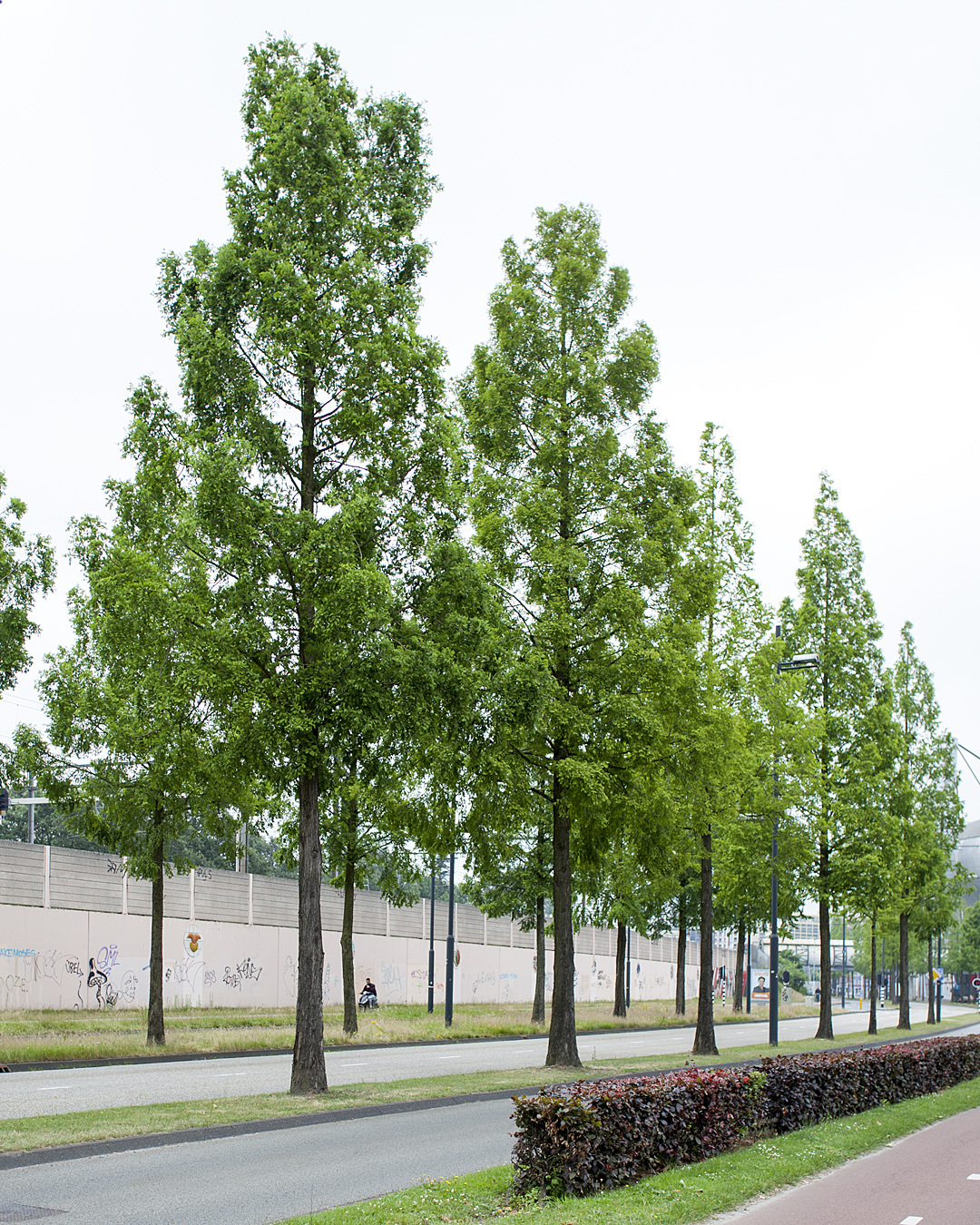
Metaseqoia glyptostroboides used as street trees in Eindhoven, Netherlands

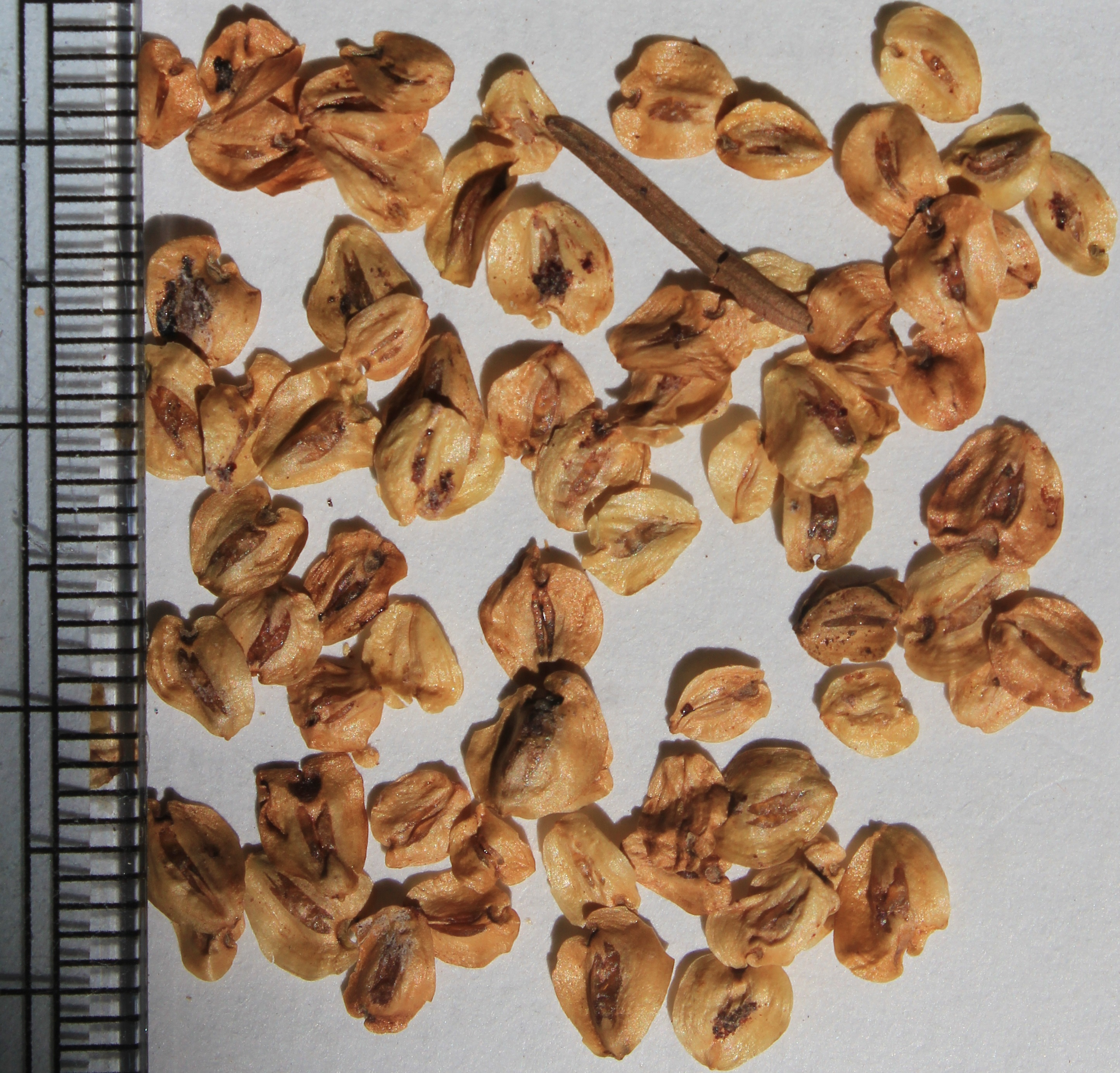
Seeds
