= Promised Land (Rurutia album) =

Studio album by Rurutia
- Released: 9 June 2004
- Label: Toshiba EMI

Rurutia chronology
Water Forest (2002)	Promised Land (2004)	Meme (2005)

"Promised Land" is the third album of Japanese singer-songwriter Rurutia. It reached No. 111 on Oricon and charted for a week.

== Track listing ==
1. Hallelujah (ハレルヤ)
2. neo
3. arabesque (アラベスク)
4. Sincere (シンシア)
5. Toroimerai (トロイメライ)
6. Giselle (ジゼル)
7. Nagareboshi (流れ星)
8. Merry (メリー)
9. GOLA
10. Tsuki Sen'ichiya (月千一夜)
11. maururu roa
