= Blondel (album) =

Studio album by Amazing Blondel
- Released: 1973
- Recorded: Island Studios
- Genre: Baroque pop
- Length: 35:24
- Label: Island ILPS 9257
- Producer: John Glover and Phil Brown

Amazing Blondel chronology
England (1972)	Blondel (1973)	Mulgrave Street (1974)

Professional ratings
Review scores
Source	Rating
Allmusic	3.5/5 stars

Blondel is an album released by the band Amazing Blondel in 1973. It is the first album without the founding member John David Gladwin, and features Steve Winwood on bass, and Simon Kirke of the Free on drums. In one song (Weavers Market) the lead singer of Free and Bad Company, Paul Rodgers appears as a vocal accompanist.

== Track listing ==
All tracks written by Edward Baird

=== Island Records – ILPS 9257, 1973 ===
Side A
No.	Title	Length
1.	"The Leaving of the Country Lover"	6:34
2.	"Young Man's Fancy"	5:20
3.	"Easy Come, Easy Go"	6.09

Side B
No.	Title	Length
1.	"Sailing"	4.30
2.	"Lesson One"	2.50
3.	"Festival"	3:27
4.	"Weavers Market"	4:35
5.	"Depression"	3:25

=== Edsel Records – EDCD 460, 1995 ===
No.	Title	Length
1.	"Prelude"	2:19
2.	"The Leaving of the Country Lover"	4:15
3.	"Young Man's Fancy"	5:18
4.	"Easy Come, Easy Go"	3:30
5.	"Solo"	2:38
6.	"Sailing"	4.30
7.	"Lesson One"	3.00
8.	"Festival"	3:27
9.	"Weavers Market"	4:35
10.	"Depression"	3:25

== Musicians ==
- Edward Baird – Vocals, guitar
- Terence Alan Wincott – Vocals, guitar, percussion, flute, crumhorn, piano, recorder
- Adrian Hopkins – Harpsichord, string arrangements
- Steve Winwood – Bass
- Simon Kirke – Drums
- Jack La Roche – String conductor

Additional Musicians

- Sue Glover – Vocal accompaniment (tracks: B3, B4 and B5)
- Sunny Leslie – Voice accompaniment (tracks: B3, B4 and B5)
- Paul Rodgers – Vocal accompaniment (only in the song: B4)
