= John's Book of Alleged Dances =

1994 composition for string quartet and recorded prepared piano

John's Book of Alleged Dances (1994) is a composition by John Adams for string quartet and recorded prepared piano. Commissioned and premiered by the Kronos Quartet, the first performance took place November 19, 1994, at the California Center for the Arts, Escondido, California.

John Adams has said that the dances are alleged because, "the steps for them had yet to be invented." The composition is approximately 35 minutes in length and is composed of ten humorously titled "dances" that may be played in any order. The movement titles are as follows:

1. Judah to Ocean
2. Toot Nipple
3. Dogjam
4. Pavane: She's So Fine
5. Rag the Bone
6. Habanera
7. Stubble Crotchet
8. Hammer & Chisel
9. Alligator Escalator
10. Ständchen: The Little Serenade

"Judah to Ocean" is a reference to the San Francisco Muni N Judah light rail line. Selections from John's Book of Alleged Dances have been set by a number of choreographers, including Paul Taylor.
