= R° (Ruratia album) =

Studio album by Rurutia
- Released: March 6, 2002
- Label: Toshiba EMI

Rurutia chronology
R° (2002)	Water Forest (2003)

R° (アール) is the debut album of Japanese singer-songwriter Rurutia. The album reached to No. 90 on Oricon and charted for a week.

== Track listing ==
1. Elements (エレメンツ)
2. Chie no Mi (知恵の実)
3. Itoshigo Yo (愛し子よ)
4. Lost Butterfly (ロスト バタフライ)
5. Akai Rousoku (赤いろうそく)
6. Ame no Hate (雨の果て)
7. Boku no Uchuu Kimi no Umi (僕の宇宙 君の海)
8. Bokura no Hakoniwa (僕らの箱庭)
9. Gin no Honoo (銀の炎)
10. Heartdance (ハートダンス)
