= Mulgrave Street =

Studio album by Amazing Blondel
- Released: October 1974
- Studio: Island
- Genre: Folk rock
- Length: 35:45
- Label: DJM DJLPS443; Air Mail Archive AIRAC-1544 (Japan 2009)
- Producer: John Glover and Phil Brown

Amazing Blondel chronology
Blondel (1973)	Mulgrave Street (1974)	Inspiration (1975)

Professional ratings
Review scores
Source	Rating
AllMusic	2/5 stars
The Rolling Stone Record Guide	3/5 stars

Mulgrave Street is an album by the English band Amazing Blondel, released in 1974. It was their first album on the DJM Records label after leaving Island Records.

The album featured performances by Free guitarist Paul Kossoff, Curved Air and Roxy Music keyboardist and violinist Eddie Jobson, Pat Donaldson from Fotheringay, John "Rabbit" Bundrick and various members of Bad Company.

== Track listing ==
Side A
No.	Title	Writer(s)	Length
1.	"Mulgrave Street"	Eddie Baird	2:28
2.	"Iron and Steel"	Baird	4:55
3.	"Leader of the Band"	Terry Wincott	4:26
4.	"Light Your Light"	Baird	3:07
5.	"Hole in the Head"	Baird	2:17

Side B
No.	Title	Writer(s)	Length
1.	"Help Us Get Along"	Baird	3:51
2.	"See 'Em Shining"	Baird	2:38
3.	"Love Must Be the Best Time of Your Life"	Baird	2:33
4.	"All I Can Do"	Baird	2:46
5.	"Goodbye Our Friends"	Wincott	3:19
6.	"Sad to See You Go"	Baird	3:23

=== Bonus tracks on the 2009 Japanese reissue ===
No.	Title	Writer(s)	Length
1.	"Runaway"	Baird	3:24
2.	"Little Darling"	Baird	3:13

== Musicians ==
- Eddie Baird – vocals, guitars, piano, bass guitar, percussion
- Terry Wincott – vocals (tracks A3, A5, B5), guitars, percussion, flute
- Paul Kossoff – lead guitar (track A5)
- Mick Ralphs – lead guitar (track B1)
- Eddie Jobson – keyboards, violin (tracks A1, B6)
- Rabbit Bundrick – keyboards (track B4)
- Mick Feat – bass guitar (tracks A1, A5)
- Alan Spenner – bass guitar (track A3)
- Boz Burrell – bass guitar (track B1)
- Pat Donaldson – bass guitar (track B5)
- William Murray – drums (tracks A1, A3–A5, B5)
- Simon Kirke – drums (tracks B1, B4)
- Sue Glover – backing vocals (tracks A5, B4)
- Sunny Leslie – backing vocals (tracks A5, B4)
