= Fantasia Lindum =

Studio album by Amazing Blondel
- Released: 1971
- Recorded: Island Studios
- Genre: Baroque pop
- Length: 35:35
- Label: Island
- Producer: Paul Samwell-Smith

Amazing Blondel chronology
Evensong (1970)	Fantasia Lindum (1971)	England (1972)

Professional ratings
Review scores
Source	Rating
Allmusic	link

Fantasia Lindum is an album released by the band Amazing Blondel in 1971. It featured the style of music which they described as "pseudo-Elizabethan/Classical acoustic music sung with British accents". The album title is taken from the musical sequence which makes up the first side of the album: a fantasia is a free musical composition with its roots in the art of improvisation; Lindum is the Latin name for the city of Lincoln.

The dog which appears on the album cover was Terry Wincott's Great Dane, called Jacob.

== The music ==
The music throughout the album features Amazing Blondel's unique blend of their own compositions with folk themes and renaissance music. The album's cover art (credited to Visualeyes) suggests a historical setting around the Civil War period, but the music has more of the vitality of the Elizabethan period. A variety of instruments were used, but the central sound is of the two lutes, played by Gladwin and Baird, with wind instruments played by Wincott.

The "Fantasia Lindum" sequence, which makes up the first side of the album, is the band's musical tribute to the city of Lincoln, the Lincolnshire countryside and the mediaeval Lincoln Cathedral. It is an ambitious suite of songs and instrumental pieces featuring recurring musical themes.

The second side includes two madrigal-like songs ("To Ye" and "Three Seasons Almaine") and two instrumental dance tunes. There is a hymn-like song ("Safety In God Alone"), which sounds much more based in the twentieth-century than the remainder of the album, having a harmonic structure more like that developed by bands such as the Eagles. The album concludes with the brash "Siege of Yaddlethorpe", a "pipe and drum" instrumental piece featuring Wincott's (presumably multi-tracked) crumhorns and a guest appearance of Jim Capaldi playing (again presumably multi-tracked) military-style snare drums.

== Track listing ==
Side one
No.	Title	Length
1.	"Fantasia Lindum": I. "Prelude and Theme"; II. "Song: Swifts, Swains, and Leafy Lanes"; III. "Dance: Jig Upon Jig; Theme (lutes and recorder)"; IV. "Dance (Galliard): God Must Doubt"; V. "Song: Lincolnshire Lullaby"; VI. "Dance: Basse Dance; Theme (lute duet)"; VII. "Dance: Quatre Dance Pavan"; VIII. "Song: Celestial Light (for Lincoln Cathedral)"; VIV. "Dance: Coranto; Theme (lutes and recorders)"; X. "End"	20:16

Side two
No.	Title	Length
1.	"To Ye"	3:18
2.	"Safety In God Alone"	4:13
3.	"Two Dances: I. "Almaine"; II. "Bransle for My Ladys' Delight""	1:51
4.	"Three Seasons Almaine"	3:31
5.	"The Siege of Yaddlethorpe"	2:26

== Musicians ==
- John David Gladwin - second lute, lead vocals, double bass, theorbo
- Terence Alan Wincott - recorders, vocals, piano, crumhorn, harpsichord, harmonium, other woodwind
- Edward Baird - first lute, vocals, glockenspiel, dulcimer, guitar
- Jim Capaldi - drums on "Siege of Yaddlethorpe"

== Release history ==
- Fantasia Lindum, Island Records ILPS-9156, 12" LP, 1971
- Fantasia Lindum, Edsel Records 459, CD, 1996
- Evensong/Fantasia Lindum, Beat Goes On 626, CD, 2004
