= Typostrophic variation =

Type of genetic variation

In population genetics, typostrophic variation is the type of genetic variation found in peripherally isolated populations. Variation of this kind is heterogeneous, due to factors such as geographic isolation and inbreeding. In 1954, Ernst Mayr wrote a landmark paper developing the idea that subspecies in typostophic populations lead to formation of incipient species. According to Mayr, species formation rarely occurred in populations which were exemplified by ecotypic variation.
