= Meme (album) =

Studio album by Rurutia
- Released: April 13, 2005
- Label: Toshiba EMI

Rurutia chronology
Promised Land (2004)	Meme (2005)	Kazuo Umezu (2005)

Meme (ミーム miimu)" is Rurutia's fourth and last original album under Toshiba-EMI and was released April 13, 2005.

== Track listing ==
1. Dancing Meme - 1:05
2. Tone - 4:22
3. Lila ga Chittemo (リラが散っても Even if the lilacs die) - 3:39
4. Primary (プライマリー) - 5:31
5. Signal (シグナル) - 4:17
6. Scarlet (スカーレット) - 4:43
7. Selenite (セレナイト) - 5:33
8. Heath no Rakuen (ヒースの楽園 The heath's paradise) - 3:48
9. Aoi Bara (青い薔薇 Blue roses) - 3:41
10. Chou no Mori (蝶ノ森 Butterfly's forest) - 4:53
11. Cobalt no Hoshi (コバルトの星 Cobalt stars) - 4:41
12. Sleeping Meme - 3:39
