= Amazing Blondel =

English musical group

- Origin: England
- Genres: Progressive folk, psychedelic folk, medieval folk rock
- Years active: 1969–1977; 1997–2005
- Labels: Bell Records, Island Records, DJM Records, HTD, Transatlantic Records, Mooncrest Records, Talking Elephant
- Members: Eddie Baird; Terry Wincott
- Past members: John Gladwin

Amazing Blondel was an English acoustic progressive folk band, consisting of Eddie Baird, John Gladwin and Terry Wincott. They released LPs on Island Records in the early 1970s. They were sometimes categorised as psychedelic folk or as medieval folk rock, but their music was more a reinvention of Renaissance music, based around the use of period instruments such as lutes and recorders.

== History ==
In the 1960s Gladwin (guitar and vocals) and Wincott (guitar and vocals) formed a band called The Dimples, with Stuart Smith (drums) and Johnny Jackson (bass guitar). They were signed to the Decca label and recorded a single, "Love of a Lifetime". The B-side, written by Gladwin, was titled "My Heart is Tied to You". The record did not chart, although the B-side later became popular on the Northern soul scene.

After the break up of The Dimples, Gladwin and Wincott formed a loud electric band called Methuselah. During Methuselah concerts they played an acoustic number, which went down well with their audiences and allowed them to display the subtlety of their singing and instrumental work. They left Methuselah in 1969 to work on their own acoustic material. At first this was derived from folk music, in line with other performers of the time. They developed their own musical idiom, influenced by early music revivalists such as David Munrow and by childhood memories of the Robin Hood TV series, with its pseudo-mediaeval soundtrack by Elton Hayes.

The band was named after Jean Blondel de Nesle, a musician and composer in the court of Richard I. According to legend, when Richard was held prisoner, Blondel travelled throughout central Europe, singing at every castle to try to find the King and help him to escape. This name for the band was suggested by a chef, Eugene McCoy, who, after listening to some of their songs, commented "Oh, very Blondel!" They were advised to add an adjective (as in The Incredible String Band) and they became "Amazing Blondel".

Their first album, The Amazing Blondel (also called "Amazing Blondel and a Few Faces"), was recorded in 1969 and released by Bell Records. It was directed by session guitarist Big Jim Sullivan. Eddie Baird, who had known the other members at school, joined the band and on 19 September 1970 they played at the first Glastonbury Festival. After what Baird described as "a disastrous showbiz record signing", Amazing Blondel were introduced by members of the band Free to Chris Blackwell of Island Records and Artists. Blackwell signed them to Island and they recorded their albums Evensong, Fantasia Lindum and England. Baird said, in an interview in 2003, that the band had "adored recording". They recorded their Island albums in the company's Basing Street Studios in London, then the source of some of the most innovative independent music in Britain.

Blondel toured widely, performing both in their own concerts and as support for other bands, including Genesis, Procol Harum and Steeleye Span. On stage, they aimed for technical precision and versatility of instrumentation -- most concerts involved the use of some forty instruments -- interspersed with banter and bawdy humour. Conflict arose between their manager's desire to organise ever more demanding tour schedules and the band's wish to spend more time writing material and working in the studio, and this led to the departure of Gladwin, who had written most of their material, in 1973. The remaining two members decided to continue as a duo. They recorded several more albums, with Baird now writing the bulk of the material. The first of these, Blondel, was their final release for Island. They signed to Dick James' DJM label, where they recorded three albums, Mulgrave Street, Inspiration and Bad Dreams. They gradually modernised and electrified their sound, and these albums featured guest musicians including Steve Winwood and Paul Kossoff. (It was mistakenly believed that they had shortened the band's name to Blondel when the title of the final Island album and the front cover of Mulgrave Street used the short version of the name.) Their final release in the 1970s was a live album.

By the end of the 1970s, with disco becoming the largest selling music genre and folk music losing popularity, Baird and Wincott stopped performing as Amazing Blondel. Gladwin reacquired the name and toured universities with bandmates and former session players from the original Amazing Blondel, Adrian Hopkins and Paul Empson. This line-up was originally billed as "John David Gladwin's Englishe Musicke". The original band reformed in 1997 and produced a new album, Restoration. They played at venues across Europe from 1997 to 2000. In 2005 Wincott had a heart bypass operation, which curtailed plans for future concerts.

In 2005, Baird played two concerts in a duo with acoustic guitarist and singer-songwriter Julie Ellison, and worked on a collaboration with Darryl Ebbatson called "Ebbatson Baird". They released four albums between 2004 and 2023, the final one an orchestral album called 'As Good As It Gets' which included reworkings of some of their earlier material.

== Band members ==
John David Gladwin and Edward Baird were born and brought up in Scunthorpe, Lincolnshire: Terence Alan Wincott was born in Hampshire and moved to Scunthorpe at an early age.

The members of the band were all accomplished musicians. Gladwin sang and played twelve-string guitar, lute, double bass, theorbo, cittern, tabor and tubular bells. Wincott sang and played 6 string guitar, harmonium, recorders, flute, ocarina, congas, crumhorn, pipe organ, tabor, harpsichord, piano, mellotron, bongos and assorted percussion. Baird sang and played lute, glockenspiel, cittern, dulcimer, twelve string guitar and percussion.

Eddie Baird died after a short illness in January 2025. John Gladwin died on 16 May 2025, aged 77.

== Style of music ==
The band composed most of their music themselves, basing it on the form and structure of Renaissance music and featuring styles such as pavanes, galliards and madrigals. Their sound was sometimes categorised as psychedelic folk, but would have been instantly recognisable to students of early music. Terry Wincott described it as "pseudo-Elizabethan/Classical acoustic music sung with British accents". Baird is quoted as saying "People used to ask us, 'How would you describe your music?' Well, there was no point asking us, we didn't have a clue." Their music has been compared to that of Gryphon and Pentangle, although Amazing Blondel did not embrace the rock influences of the former or the folk and jazz influences of the latter. They were also likened to Jethro Tull.

== Later instruments ==
The band employed a wide range of acoustic instruments (see above) but central to their sound was their use of lute and recorders. When touring, the lutes proved to be difficult to use, in terms of amplification and tuning, for stage performance. In 1971 the band commissioned the construction of two 7-string guitars, which could be played in lute tuning. The design and construction of these instruments was undertaken by David Rubio, who made classical guitars, lutes, and other early instruments for classical players, including Julian Bream and John Williams.

Gladwin's instrument was designed to have more bass as it was used mainly as an accompaniment instrument. Baird's had more treble emphasis to allow melodic playing in the higher register to predominate. The two instruments were individually successful, and also blended well together. They also proved to be stable, from a tuning point of view, for stage performance. The guitars were fitted with internal microphones to simplify amplification.

== Discography ==
=== Studio albums ===
Title	Year	Label	Line-up
The Amazing Blondel (aka The Amazing Blondel and a Few Faces)	1970	Bell Records	John Gladwin, Terry Wincott
Evensong	1970	Island Records	Eddie Baird, John Gladwin, Terry Wincott
Fantasia Lindum	1971	Island Records	Eddie Baird, John Gladwin, Terry Wincott
England	1972	Island Records	Eddie Baird, John Gladwin, Terry Wincott
Blondel	1973	Island Records	Eddie Baird, Terry Wincott
Mulgrave Street	1974	DJM Records	Eddie Baird, Terry Wincott
Inspiration	1975	DJM Records	Eddie Baird, Terry Wincott
Bad Dreams	1976	DJM Records	Eddie Baird, Terry Wincott
Restoration	1997	HTD Records	Eddie Baird, John Gladwin, Terry Wincott
The Amazing Elsie Emerald	2010	Talking Elephant	Eddie Baird, Terry Wincott

=== Other releases ===
- Live in Tokyo (1977) (actually this live album was recorded in Europe)
- Englishe Musicke (compilation), Edsel Records, (1993)
- A Foreign Field That Is Forever England (recorded live, 1972–1973) HTD Records (1996)
- Evensong/Fantasia Lindum, Beat Goes On 626 (2004)
- Going Where The Music Takes Me (Live & Studio Archive recordings From The 60's To the 80's) (2-CD-Box + DVD), Shakedown Records (2004)(Compilation with 38 unreleased songs; no Amazing Blondel recordings but songs by the individual members)
- Harvest of gold - The English Folk Almanach (Live sampler including recordings from Steeleye Span; Fairport Convention and Magna Carta as well as five live recordings by Amazing Blondel from the early 1970s which are otherwise unreleased)
