= Water Forest Press Publishing =

Book publisher in Pennsylvania, US

- Industry: Publishing
- Founder: Victoria Valentine
- Parent: Skyline Publications (until 2004)
- Website: waterforestpress.com

Water Forest Press is an independent book publisher located in rural Pennsylvania. It was created as an imprint of magazine publisher Skyline Publications but moved to book publishing when Skyline shut down.

== History ==
Water Forest Press was created by Victoria Valentine, as an imprint of Skyline Publications. Skyline Publications produced print magazines that were retired in 2004. Water Forest Press replaced Skyline Magazines with Skyline Review, Literary House Review & Hudson View Poetry Digest books. Skyline Publications published monthly literary magazines that were distributed nationwide in stores, libraries, universities and homes, with a readership of approximately 10,000 per issue. "A Tribute To America" issue (dedicated to 9/11) was reprinted three times. All proceeds from the Tribute Issue were donated to local fire houses to purchase needed equipment.

Water Forest Press is now a small, specialty publisher, designing and producing poetry collections, short-story collections and multi-genre fiction and non-fiction trade paperback books. The press annually nominates writers & poets from each publication for Pushcart Prize Best of the Small Presses. Water Forest Press volumes are archived in the New York Public Library, John D. Rockefeller, Jr. Library, University of Wisconsin–Madison Library, Brown University Rockefeller Library and UC Berkeley Library. Water Forest Press Books at Oslo Norway Writer's Conference 2008.

Water Forest Press, under Skyline Online imprint, encourages and promotes young poets on "Street Speakers" Teen Ink.

== Publications and authors ==
- Quarterly Hudson View Poetry Digest
- Annual Skyline Review
- Annual Literary House Review

=== Authors & poets published ===
- Orania Hamilton
- Jan Oskar Hansen
- Alan D. Bush
- Vic Fortezza
- Douglas H. Maloney
- Merlina Davis
- Noah Wereham
- Adam Donaldson Powell

=== Featured artists ===
- Matt Hughes Gallery
- Maria Zeldis
- Henri Peter
- Amanda Tucker
- Riki R. Nelson Gallery
- Michael Aanji Crowley Imagery
