= Evensong (album) =

Studio album by Amazing Blondel
- Released: 1970
- Recorded: Island Studios
- Genre: Baroque pop
- Length: 33:02
- Label: Island ILPS 9136
- Producer: Paul Samwell-Smith

Amazing Blondel chronology
| The Amazing Blondel (1970) | Evensong (1970) | Fantasia Lindum (1971) |

Professional ratings
Review scores
| Source | Rating |
|---|---|
| Allmusic | 3.5/5 stars |

Evensong was the second album released by the band Amazing Blondel. It featured the style of music which they described as "pseudo-Elizabethan/Classical acoustic music sung with British accents".

By this time, the band were touring Britain extensively as part of a package of artists supporting major bands such as Free, and their contrasting style coupled with bawdy anecdotes between songs found favour with rock audiences.

The gatefold album cover shows the band in the cloisters of Lincoln Cathedral holding period instruments, while the interior lists credits and lyrics for the songs surrounding a photograph of the band in performance.

== Track listing ==
All songs credited to Gladwin, except where specified.

Side one
| No. | Title | Writer(s) | Length |
|---|---|---|---|
| 1. | "Pavan" | | 3:20 |
| 2. | "St. Crispin's Day" | | 2:18 |
| 3. | "Spring Season" | | 3:38 |
| 4. | "Willowood" | | 3:22 |
| 5. | "Evensong" | | 3:10 |
| 6. | "Queen of Scots" | Baird | 1:40 |

Side two
| No. | Title | Length |
|---|---|---|
| 1. | "Ploughman" | 3:05 |
| 2. | "Old Moot Hall" | 2:38 |
| 3. | "Lady Marion's Galliard" | 3:44 |
| 4. | "Under the Greenwood Tree" | 3:15 |
| 5. | "Anthem" | 2:52 |

== Personnel ==
- John David Gladwin - lead vocals, lute, theorboe, cittern, double bass
- Terence Alan Wincott - crumhorn, recorders, pipe-organ, vocals (and occasional lead vocals), tabor pipe, tabor, flute, harmonium, lute, harpsichord
- Edward Baird - lute, cittern, vocals (and very occasional lead vocals)
- Chris Karan - percussion
- Adam Skeaping - viola da gamba, violone
