= Water Forest (Xinghua) =

Park in Xinghua, Jiangsu, China

The Water Forest (Chinese: 兴化李中水上森林) is a park in the north-west part of the city of Xinghua, in Jiangsu Province, eastern China.

Tourists come to see dawn redwoods (Metasequoia glyptostroboides) trees, which are rooted in water, and give the park its name. The species is listed as critically endangered in the wild.

Various animals also live in the park, including nationally protected species, such as the Chinese pond heron (Ardeola bacchus).
