= Ecotypic variation =

Type of genetic variation

In population genetics, ecotypic variation is the type of genetic variation found in large, continuous geographic populations. Variation of this kind is homogeneous, due to factors such as gene flow. In 1954 Ernst Mayr wrote a landmark paper attacking the idea that subspecies in ecotypic populations would lead to the formation of incipient species. According to Mayr, species formation occurs in populations which are small and isolated, that is, populations which exemplified typostrophic variation.
