= Rurutia =

Japanese singer-songwriter

- Also known as: Rurutia (ルルティア)
- Born
- Origin: Japan
- Genres: Experimental, new-age, electronica, ambient
- Occupations: Singer, songwriter
- Instruments: Vocals, Piano
- Years active: 2001–2025
- Labels: Toshiba-EMI (2001–2005); Express (2001-2004); Capitol Music (2005); Phoerix Records (2005-2014); Studio AS (2015)
- Website: https://www.instagram.com/rurutia_official/

RURUTIA (ルルティア) is a Japanese singer-songwriter. She began her career in 2001 with the release of the single "Itoshigo yo" when she was signed with Toshiba-EMI. She has released twelve albums and eleven singles. RURUTIA is intensely private; most aspects of her life – including her real name, date of birth, and hometown, are kept private, and she has never appeared on a TV program or held a live concert since her debut. Her mass media appearances have been limited to broadcasts of the Internet radio program "RURUTIA Planet," which began streaming on her official website after she became independent, interviews with photos posted on her official website, and interviews in music magazines. As for avoiding media exposure, she cites the glamorous world of the public spotlight and her own musical world as being at odds with each other.

Her pseudonym, RURUTIA, is derived from the Tahitian word 'rorotea' meaning "blissful rain" according to her artist profile when she was with Toshiba-EMI. She was given this name by a Tahitian priest, an acquaintance of her parents, as an abundance of rain is seen as a blessing.

On 12 May 2024, she announced she would be retiring from the music industry on 31 December 2024, and closing her social media accounts at the same time. However, on 30 December 2024, she announced she would continue to post on her Instagram and Cameo. On 4 July 2025 she has surprisingly announced a second 'Best Of' album for her indies years to be released on 26 August 2025, and would keep posting about details of the album and merchandise.

== Discography ==
=== Singles ===
- Itoshigo yo [愛し子よ] (6 October 2001)
- Lost Butterfly [ロスト バタフライ] (6 December 2001)
- Yuruginai Utsukushii Mono [ゆるぎない美しいもの] (26 June 2002)
- Suzaku no Sora [朱雀の空] (30 September 2002)
- Shine [シャイン] (22 January 2003)
- Träumerei [トロイメライ] (29 October 2003)
- Primary [プライマリー] (2 March 2005)
- Spinel [スピネル] (21 November 2005)
- Hohoemi no MARIA [微笑みのマリア] (26 January 2006)
- Reirei Tenohira [玲々テノヒラ] (31 May 2006)
- Pluie [プリュイ] (26 June 2013)
- Don't Look at The Color (18 November 2015)
- Deeply (6 May 2020)
- 「結」 (25 November 2020)
- We Say Good Night (21 December 2020)
- 7th Heaven (30 August 2021)
- Loop in the Sky (26 May 2022)
- Metronome/Enhance (28 January 2025)

=== Albums ===
- R° (6 March 2002)

1. エレメンツ (Elements)
2. 知恵の実 (A Fruit of Knowledge)
3. 愛し子よ (My Beloved Child)
4. ロスト バタフライ (Lost Butterfly)
5. 赤いろうそく (Red Candle)
6. 雨の果て (The End of the Rain)
7. 僕の宇宙 君の海 (My Universe, Your Ocean)
8. 僕らの箱庭 (Our Miniature Garden)
9. 銀の炎 (Silver Flame)
10. ハートダンス (Heart Dance)

- Water Forest (26 February 2003)

1. パヴァーヌ (Pavane)
2. 朱雀の空 (Sky of Suzaku)
3. オール (Oar)
4. 星のたましい (Star Souls)
5. サンクチュアリ (Sanctuary)
6. ゆるぎない美しいもの (Unwavering Beautiful Thing)
7. 幻惑の風 (A Bewitching Wind)
8. シャイン (Shine)
9. 満ちる森 (The Forest Full of Sorrow)
10. 思季 (Thinking about the Seasons)

- Promised Land / プロミスト・ランド (9 June 2004)

1. ハレルヤ (Hallelujah)
2. neo
3. アラベスク (Arabesque)
4. シンシア (Cynthia)
5. トロイメライ (Träumerei)
6. ジゼル (Giselle)
7. 流れ星 (Shooting Star)
8. メリー (Merry)
9. GOLA
10. 月千一夜 (One Thousand and One Moonlit Nights)
11. maururu roa ('thank you very much' in Tahitian)

- Meme / ミーム (13 April 2005)

1. Dancing Meme
2. tone
3. リラが散っても (Even if the Lilacs Drop)
4. プライマリー(album ver.) (Primary)
5. シグナル (Signal)
6. スカーレット (Scarlet)
7. セレナイト (Selenite)
8. ヒースの楽園 (Paradise in the Heath)
9. 青い薔薇 (Blue Rose)
10. 蝶ノ森 (Butterfly Forest)
11. コバルトの星 (Cobalt Star)
12. Sleeping Meme

- Kazuo Umezu's Horror Theater / 楳図かずお恐怖劇場 (film soundtrack, 21 June 2005)

1. 蝶ノ森(オープニングテーマ-cinema track-) (Chō no Mori)
2. ハレルヤ (Hallelujah)
3. トロイメライ (Träumerei)
4. 蝶ノ森 (Chō no Mori)
5. 知恵の実 (Chie no Mi)
6. パヴァーヌ (Pavane)
7. エレメンツ (Elements)
8. 満ちる森 (Michiru Mori)
9. 僕の宇宙 君の海 (Boku no Uchū Kimi no Umi)
10. 僕らの箱庭 (Bokura no Hakoniwa)
11. neo
12. コバルトの星 (Cobalt no Hoshi)
13. エレメンツ (Elements)
14. サンクチュアリ (Sanctuary)
15. コバルトの星(エンディングテーマ－cinema track-) (Cobalt no Hoshi)

- Chorion (8 November 2006)

1. ABINTRA
2. 玲々テノヒラ (Midas Touch)
3. 星に花、灰色の雨 (Album ver) (Flowers for a Star, and the Grey Rain)
4. 水景色 星模様 (Water Scenery, Star Patterns)
5. 願いの届く日 (The Day Our Wishes Come True)
6. スピネル (Spinel)
7. Time Traveller
8. パレード (Parade)
9. 微笑みのマリア (Smiling Virgin Mary)
10. マグノリアの情景 (The Landscape Of Magnolias)
11. ABINTRA (Instrumental)
12. 水景色 星模様 (Inst) (Mizugeshiki Hoshimoyō)
13. 願いの届く日 (Instrumental) (Negai No Todoku Hi)
14. スピネル (Instrumental) (Spinel)
15. 微笑みのマリア (Instrumental) (Hohoemi No Maria)

- Opus (27 June 2007)

1. Opus
2. 流光 (Flowing Light)
3. 水景色 星模様 (Ballad Ver) (Mizugeshiki Hoshimoyō)
4. 愛し子よ (Ballad Ver) (Itoshigo Yo)
5. アラベスク (Ballad Ver) (Arabesque)
6. 星と羽 (Stars and Feathers)
7. Opus (Music Box) *Bonus Track
8. 流光 (Music Box) *Bonus Track

- 氷鎖 (Hyousa/Frozen Chain) (30 April 2008)

1. 氷鎖 (Hyousa/Frozen Chain)
2. 無憂歌 (A Song of Fearlessness)
3. Opus (Ballad Ver)
4. 銀の炎 (Ballad Ver) (Gin no Honoo)
5. 星のたましい (Ballad Ver) (Hoshi no Tamashii)
6. 玲々テノヒラ (Ballad Ver) (Reirei Tenohira)
7. 氷鎖 (Music Box Ver) *Bonus Track
8. 無憂歌 (Music Box Ver) *Bonus Track

- Seirios (27 February 2009)

1. Seirios
2. サイレントプレイヤー (Silent Prayers)
3. Opus
4. オーロラ飛行 (Aurora Flight)
5. 流光 (Flowing Light)
6. 無憂歌 (Muyuu ka)
7. LAST DAY
8. 氷鎖 (Frozen Chain)
9. 夢蛍 (Yume Hotaru / Dream Firefly)
10. VOID
11. 星と羽 (Hoshi to Hane)

- Behind the blue (7 October 2010)

1. Behind the blue
2. Rainbow
3. 花綴り (silky jazz ver) (Spelling with Flowers)
4. 夢蛍 (candle night remix) (Yume Hotaru)
5. Rainbow (alegria dance remix)
6. Behind the blue (midnight story remix)
7. LAST DAY (autumn moon remix)
8. Behind the blue (Instrumental)
9. Rainbow (Instrumental)

- RESONANCE (27 April 2011)

1. RESONANCE
2. Invitation
3. 深藍 (Deep Blue)
4. RESONANCE (acoustic ver)
5. Invitation (acoustic ver)
6. 深藍 (Ballad ver)
7. RESONANCE (Instrumental)
8. Invitation (Instrumental)
9. 深藍 (Instrumental)

- Node From R (5 September 2012)

1. Apeture
2. The Name Of Anger
3. Mystic Pendulum
4. Behind the blue
5. スペクトル (Spectrum)
6. Invitation
7. In The Majority
8. 深藍 (Deep Blue)
9. アイリス (Iris)
10. I Keep On Lovin' you
11. Rainbow
12. Mystic Pendulum ~The Rusty Veil Ver.~
13. 一粒の灯火 (Single Grain of Light)
14. RESONANCE
15. Lullaby

- SIX of CUPS a time to 2001~2005 (28 January 2025)

1. 愛し子よ (My Beloved Child)
2. ロスト バタフライ (Lost Butterfly)
3. 赤いろうそく (Red Candle)
4. 雨の果て (The End of the Rain)
5. 僕らの箱庭 (Our Miniature Garden)
6. 朱雀の空 (Suzaku Sky)
7. 幻惑の風 (The Wind of Illusion)
8. シャイン (Shine)
9. アラベスク (Arabesque)
10. トロイメライ (Träumerei)
11. 流れ星 (Shooting Star)
12. プライマリー (Single Version) (Primary)
13. シグナル (Signal)
14. セレナイト (Selenite)
15. コバルトの星 (Cobalt no Hoshi/Cobalt Star)

- 烙影 -The Song for 2005-2025 (26 August 2025)

1. ABINTRA
2. 怜々テノヒラ (Midas Touch)
3. 願いの届く日 (The Day Our Wishes Come True)
4. スピネル (Spinel)
5. Seirios
6. サイレントプレイヤー (Silent Prayers)
7. Opus
8. 流光 (Flowing Light)
9. LAST DAY
10. 氷鎖 (Frozen Chain)
11. The Name of Anger
12. Behind The Blue
13. スペクトル (Spectrum)
14. 深藍 (Deep Blue)
15. RESONANCE
16. Metronome
