= Water Forest (album) =

Studio album by Rurutia
- Released: February 26, 2003
- Label: Toshiba EMI

Rurutia chronology
R° (2002)	Water Forest (2003)	Promised Land (2004)

Water Forest is Japanese singer-songwriter Rurutia's second album under the Toshiba EMI label. The album reached to No. 226 on Oricon and charted for a week.

== Track listing ==
1. Pavane (パヴァーヌ)
2. Suzaku no Sora (朱雀の空)
3. Oar (オール)
4. Hoshi no Tamashii (星のたましい)
5. Sanctuary (サンクチュアリ)
6. Yuruginai Utsukushii Mono (ゆるぎない美しいもの)
7. Genwaku no Kaze (幻惑の風)
8. Shine (シャイン)
9. Michiru Mori (満ちる森)
10. Omoi Ki (思季)
