= Are =

Are commonly refers to:

- Are (unit), a unit of area equal to 100 m^{2}

Are, ARE or Åre may also refer to:

== Places ==
- Åre, a locality in Sweden
- Åre Municipality, a municipality in Sweden
  - Åre ski resort in Sweden
- Are Parish, a municipality in Pärnu County, Estonia
  - Are, Estonia, a small borough in Are Parish
- Are-Gymnasium, a secondary school in Bad Neuenahr-Ahrweiler
- Are, Saare County, a village in Pöide Parish, Saare County, Estonia
- Arab Republic of Egypt
- United Arab Emirates (ISO 3166-1 alpha-3 country code ARE)

== Science, technology, and mathematics ==
- Are (moth), a genus of moth
- Admiralty Research Establishment, a precursor to the UK's Defence Research Agency
- Aircraft Reactor Experiment, a US military program in the 1950s
- Algebraic Riccati equation, in control theory
- Asymptotic relative efficiency, in statistics
- AU-rich element, in genetics

== Organisations ==
- Admiralty Research Establishment, a precursor to the UK's Defence Research Agency
- Association for Research and Enlightenment, an organization devoted to American claimed psychic Edgar Cayce
- Associate of the Royal Society of Painter-Printmakers, in the UK
- AIRES, a Colombian airline (ICAO code ARE)
- Alexandria Real Estate Equities, NYSE ticker symbol ARE

== Other uses ==
- are, a form of the English verb "to be"
- Are, a musical note; see Guidonian hand
- Are (surname), recorded in Chinese history
- Dirk van Are, bishop and lord of Utrecht in the 13th century
- Are languages, a subgroup of the Are-Taupota languages
  - Are language, a language from Papua New Guinea
- A.R.E. Weapons, a band from New York City, formed in 1999
- Architect Registration Examination, a professional licensure examination in the US
- Hieda no Are, a Japanese person who helped compile the Koijiki

== See also ==
- Ar (disambiguation)
- ARR (disambiguation)
- Arre (disambiguation)
- R (disambiguation)
