= R (disambiguation) =

R, or r, is the eighteenth letter of the English alphabet.

R or r may also refer to:

== Science ==
=== Biology and medicine ===
- Arginine, an amino acid abbreviated as Arg or R
- ATC code R Respiratory system, a section of the Anatomical Therapeutic Chemical Classification System
- Coefficient of relationship (r), in biology
- Effective reproduction number (R), the number of cases generated by one case in the current state of a population in epidemiology
  - Basic reproduction number (R_{0}), the expected number of cases directly generated by one case
- Haplogroup R (mtDNA), a human mitochondrial DNA (mtDNA) haplogroup
- Haplogroup R (Y-DNA), a Y-chromosomal DNA (Y-DNA) haplogroup
- Net reproduction rate (R_{0}), the average number of offspring that would be born to a female given conforming conditions
- r, the population growth rate in the r/K selection theory of ecology

=== Astronomy ===
- Spectral resolution ($\mathbb{R}$), in astronomy
- Orangish or K carbon stars (stellar classification: R)

=== Physics ===
- R (cross section ratio), the ratio of hadronic to muonic cross sections
- Electrical resistance (R)
- Roentgen (unit) (R), a unit of measurement for ionizing radiation such as X-ray and gamma rays
- Rydberg constant (R_{∞}, R_{H}), a physical constant relating to energy levels of electrons within atoms
  - Rydberg unit of energy (R_{y}), the energy of the photon whose wavenumber is the Rydberg constant

==== Temperature scales ====
- Rankine scale (°R, °Ra)
- Réaumur scale (°Ré, °Re, °r)
- Rømer scale (°R, °Rø)

=== Chemistry ===
- Gas constant (R), in chemistry
- (R), one of two chiral center configurations in the R/S system
- Alkyl group, commonly marked as R in structural formulas
- Side chain (an unspecified group of atoms), in a chemical or structural formula

=== Mathematics ===
- r is the symbol for the radius of a circle
- $\mathbb{R}$ or R, the set of all real numbers
- Pearson product-moment correlation coefficient (r), in statistics
- R (programming language), an environment for statistical computing and graphics
- Ricci curvature
- Γ, the gamma function

== Technology and engineering ==
- R-value (insulation), a non-SI measure of thermal resistance used in housing insulation
- R-value (soils), property of soils used in pavement design
- Resistor, an electronic component
- R-, a refrigerant numbering system
- R, the ratio between the minimum and maximum stresses in fracture mechanics
- R- or recall-button, now mostly used to switch between two calls

=== Computing ===
- R (programming language), an environment for statistical computing and graphics
- R (complexity), the set of all recursive languages
- IBM System R, an IBM database system
- RequestBot, a service in QuakeNet's IRC services

== Arts and entertainment ==
=== Music ===
- Ritardando, a term for slowing the tempo down gradually
- R. (R. Kelly album), a 1998 album by R. Kelly
- R° (Ruratia album), a 2002 album by Rurutia
- R (single album), a 2021 single album by Rosé
- Rated R (Queens of the Stone Age album), 2000 album also called R
- R (jp), 2005 J-Pop album by Ryoko Shiraishi

=== Film ===
- R (film), a 2010 film by Danish screenwriter and film director Tobias Lindholm
- R, a character played by John Cleese in The World Is Not Enough
- R, the protagonist of Warm Bodies, based on the book of the same name
- R, a film rating in the Motion Picture Association of America film rating system and in the Canadian Home Video Rating System

=== Television ===
- Rajawali Televisi (RTV), television in Indonesia
- R, the production code for the 1965 Doctor Who serial The Chase

=== Video games ===
- R·Type, an arcade video game
- R: Rock'n Riders, in the list of PlayStation games (M–Z)

== Organisations ==
- The Crown, Rex (King) or Regina (Queen) in Commonwealth nations
- Ryder (NYSE ticker symbol)
- R (cable operator), a telecommunications company
- R, denoting a member of the US Republican Party

== Transportation ==
- Nissan Skyline GT-R, commonly referred to as the "R" among Japanese speakers
- R (New York City Subway service)
- Rinkai Line, a railway line operated by the Tokyo Waterfront Area Rapid Transit, labeled
- Transilien Line R, a line of the Paris transport network
- Reconnaissance aircraft (military designation: R)
- Restricted airspace
- Volkswagen R, the performance division of Volkswagen
- The official West Japan Railway Company service symbol for:
  - Hanwa Line.
  - San'yō Main Line.
- Raipur Junction railway station (Indian Railways station code: R), Chhattisgarh, India
- Banyumas, Cilacap, Purbalingga and Banjarnegara (vehicle registration prefix R)
- Taipei Metro's Tamsui-Xinyi line (metro line prefix R)

== Other uses ==
- Registered trademark symbol (®)
- South African rand (R), a currency
- Right (direction)
- Rolled R (IPA: r), the alveolar trill of Spanish, Italian, & Arabic languages
- ʀ, symbol for transliteration of the Younger Futhark rune ᛦ
- ʀ, the voiced uvular trill
- UTC−05:00 (military time zone code: Romeo)
- Я, a Cyrillic letter similar to R
- Subreddit, user-created areas of interest where discussions on Reddit are organized.

== See also ==
- RR (disambiguation)
  - RRR (disambiguation)
    - RRRR (disambiguation)
- Are (disambiguation)
- Arre (disambiguation)
- R. (disambiguation)
- R* (disambiguation)
- R- (disambiguation)
- R+ (disambiguation)
- /r/ (disambiguation)
- R class (disambiguation)
- Model R (disambiguation)
- Type R (disambiguation)
- "R" Is for Ricochet, the eighteenth novel in Sue Grafton's "Alphabet mystery" series, published in 2004
- The three Rs, of reading, writing and arithmetic
