= R- =

R- may represent:

- a type of chirality, in chemical notation
- an R prefix used for various constants
- the set of negative real numbers
- negative reinforcement, in behavioural psychology
- membership of the United States Republican Party, when placed before a state abbreviation, usually in parentheses after the name of a politician
