= R. =

R. or r. may refer to:

- Reign, the period of time during which an Emperor, king, queen, etc., is ruler
- Rex or regina, abbreviated as R., the Latin words meaning "King" and "Queen", respectively
  - Commonly used for criminal prosecution in Commonwealth realms where offences are brought in the name of the monarch (e.g. "R. v Defendant")
- Regnavit or rexit, abbreviated as r., used in historiography to designate the ruling period of a person in dynastic power, to distinguish from his or her lifespan (e.g. "Charles V (r. 1519–1556)")
- R., an album by American singer R. Kelly

== See also ==
- R (disambiguation)
