= Rex (title) =

Latin title that means "king"

The Latin title rex has the meaning of "king, ruler" (monarch). It is derived from Proto-Indo-European *h₃rḗǵs. Its cognates include Sanskrit rājan, Gothic reiks, and Old Irish rí, etc. Its Greek equivalent is archon (ἄρχων), "leader, ruler, chieftain".

The chief magistrate of the Roman Kingdom was titled Rex Romae (King of Rome).

== See also ==
- R.
- Reich
- Dux
- Basileus
- Germanic king
