= R+ =

R+ or R Plus may refer to:

- R+ tree, a data structure in computer science
- $\mathbb{R}^{+}$, the set of positive real numbers (or, depending on author, the set of non-negative real numbers)
- Positive reinforcement, in behavioural psychology
- Rammstein, German band
- R Plus (musician), pseudonym of music producer Rollo Armstrong
- Rocksmith +, a video game made by Ubisoft
- Rozwój Plus, a Polish political association
