= Are-Gymnasium =

Coordinates: 50.5396°N 7.1481°E

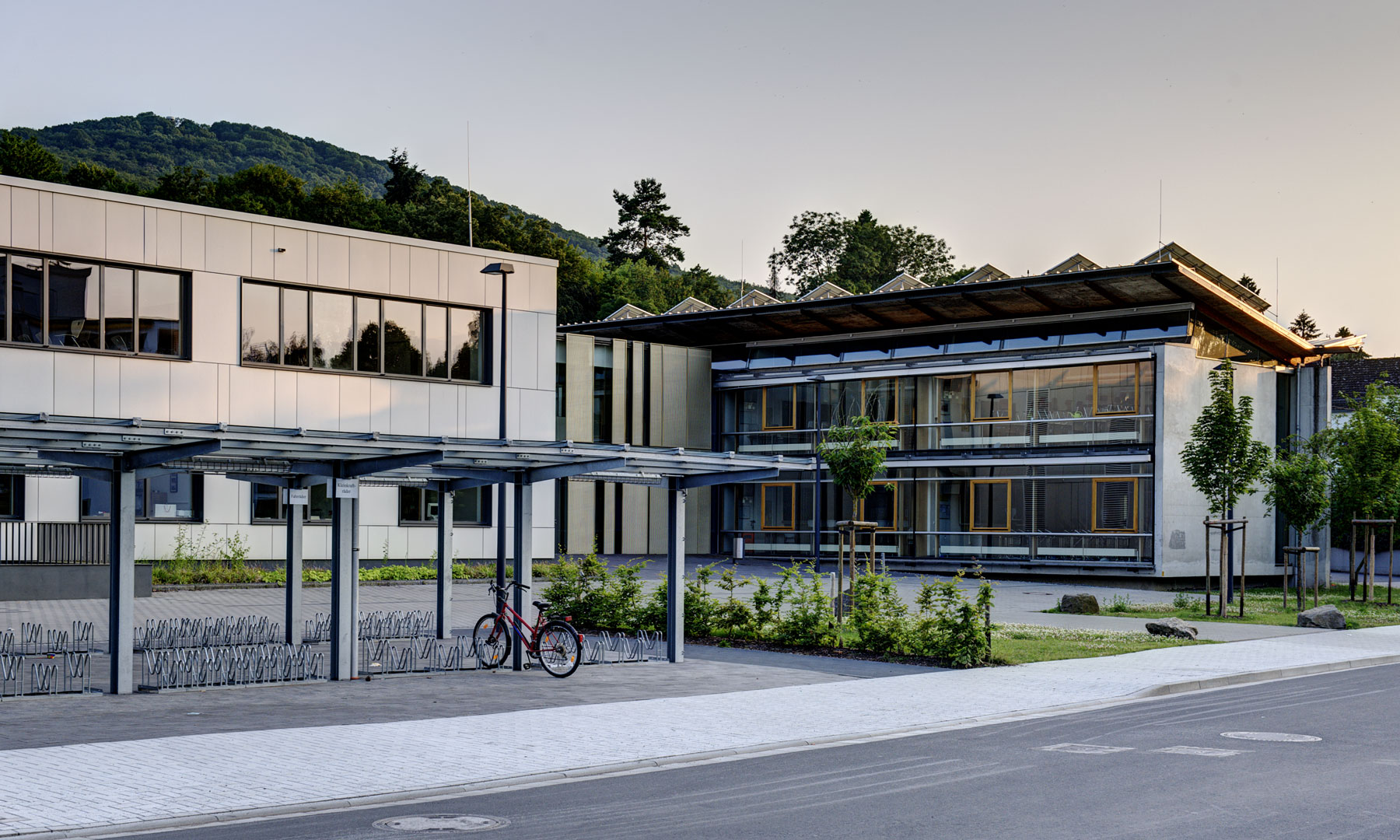

Location
- Mittelstraße 110; 53474 Bad Neuenahr-Ahrweiler

Information
- Type: Gymnasium
- Established: 1947
- Principal: Nina Pfeil
- Staff: 63
- Enrollment: 863
- Website: www.are-gymnasium.de

The Are-Gymnasium is a secondary school located in Bad Neuenahr-Ahrweiler. In 2007, it became the first full-day school in Rhineland-Palatinate with an eight-year academic program. The school's language offerings include English, French, and Latin.

== History ==
=== 1940s to 1960s ===
The name "Are" originates from the noble family of the same name, which had its ancestral seat at the Burg Are in Altenahr. The Are-Gymnasium was founded in 1965, with an attached boarding school for boys, which operated until 1980. The school evolved from the Pädagogium, which was one of the first schools approved by the French occupation zone in Germany after the end of the Nazi regime.

=== 1970s to 1980s ===
In the early 1970s, the Are-Gymnasium initiated school partnerships and exchange programs with institutions in France and England, expanding in the mid-1980s to include a partnership with a school in Chicago. The school transitioned to a full-time institution in 1974, accommodating students from grades 5 through 13. In 1989, legal action by students and parents successfully prevented the school's closure, with a decision in their favor by the administrative court.

=== 1990s to Present ===
In 2008, the Are-Gymnasium was among the first G8 all-day high schools in Rhineland-Palatinate. In 2018, it was officially recognized as a European School, and in 2019, it also gained certification as a Fairtrade School. On July 14, 2021, the school was significantly impacted by the flooding of the Ahr River. Since January 4, 2022, the Are-Gymnasium has been operating out of a container school in Ringen. Prior to this, they had been using the facilities of the IGS in Remagen.

On August 1, 2022, Nina Pfeil became the first woman to assume the position of principal.

== Teachers ==
106 teachers have been or are currently employed at the Are-Gymnasium.
