= R* (disambiguation) =

*R or R* denote hyperreal numbers.

R* may also refer to:

- R* rule (ecology), or resource-ratio hypothesis, a hypothesis in community ecology
- Rockstar Games, an American video game publisher
- r* or r-star, natural rate of interest
- R*-tree, a tree data structure for spatial access
- Rstar, later called Okina, a sub-satellite of SELENE

== See also ==
- Berkeley r-commands, to enable Unix users to issue commands to another Unix computer via TCP/IP computer network
- Carbon star
- Variable star
