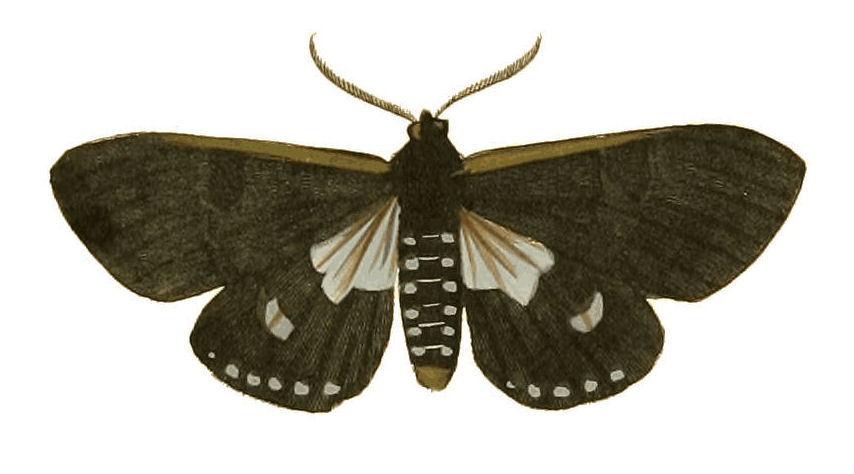

Scientific classification
- Domain: Eukaryota
- Kingdom: Animalia
- Phylum: Arthropoda
- Class: Insecta
- Order: Lepidoptera
- Superfamily: Noctuoidea
- Family: Erebidae
- Subfamily: Arctiinae
- Genus: Are; Walker, 1855
- Species: A. druryi

Binomial name
- Are druryi Watson & Goodger, 1986

Synonyms
- Phalaena marginata Drury, 1773 (preocc. Linnaeus, 1758)

= Are druryi =

Species of moth

Are is a monotypic moth genus in the subfamily Arctiinae erected by Francis Walker in 1855. The type (and only current assigned) species is Are druryi, which is found on Jamaica. This species was described by Dru Drury in 1773 under the name Phalaena marginata, but this name was already preoccupied by another Phalaena marginata Linnaeus, 1758 and a new specific epithet, honouring Drury, was assigned in 1986.

== Description ==
Upperside: Antennae pectinated. Head black. Neck yellow. Tongue distinct. Thorax and abdomen black; the latter having two rows of grey spots placed along the upperside, and reaching towards the anus, which is yellow. Anterior wings deep black, the anterior edges next the shoulders being yellow. Posterior wings sooty black, with a whitish cloud next the shoulders, and a white spot near the centre of each; a row of whitish spots are also placed along the external edges, which become fainter as they approach the upper corners.

Underside: Breast, sides, legs, and abdomen black. All the wings are the same; the anterior ones being edged with yellow next the shoulders, and two faint grey spots near the middle; a small whitish streak is also placed on the posterior ones, next the abdominal edges, about a quarter of an inch from the shoulders, where is a small yellow spot on each wing. Margins of the wings entire. Wingspan nearly 2 ½ inches (62 mm).
