= Volkswagen R =

Brand for high-performance Volkswagen models

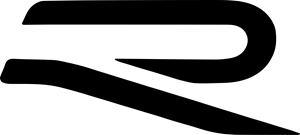
- Product type: Performance cars
- Current owner: Volkswagen Group
- Produced by: Volkswagen
- Country: Germany
- Introduced: 2002; 24 years ago
- Website: volkswagen.de/volkswagen-r

Volkswagen R is the brand used by the German auto manufacturer Volkswagen to indicate a sport or high performance model. An "R" badge is placed on the grille, front fenders and trunk of R-model vehicles to indicate the vehicle's trim level.

The R-marque is used on certain performance models alongside "GT" model designations, such as the GTI, GLI, GTE and GTD. These vehicles are also sold as "sport models" but are less performance-oriented when compared to vehicles such as the Golf R.

The 2022 Volkswagen Touareg R-Line was renamed to R-Style.

== Models ==
=== Golf R32 (Mk4) ===
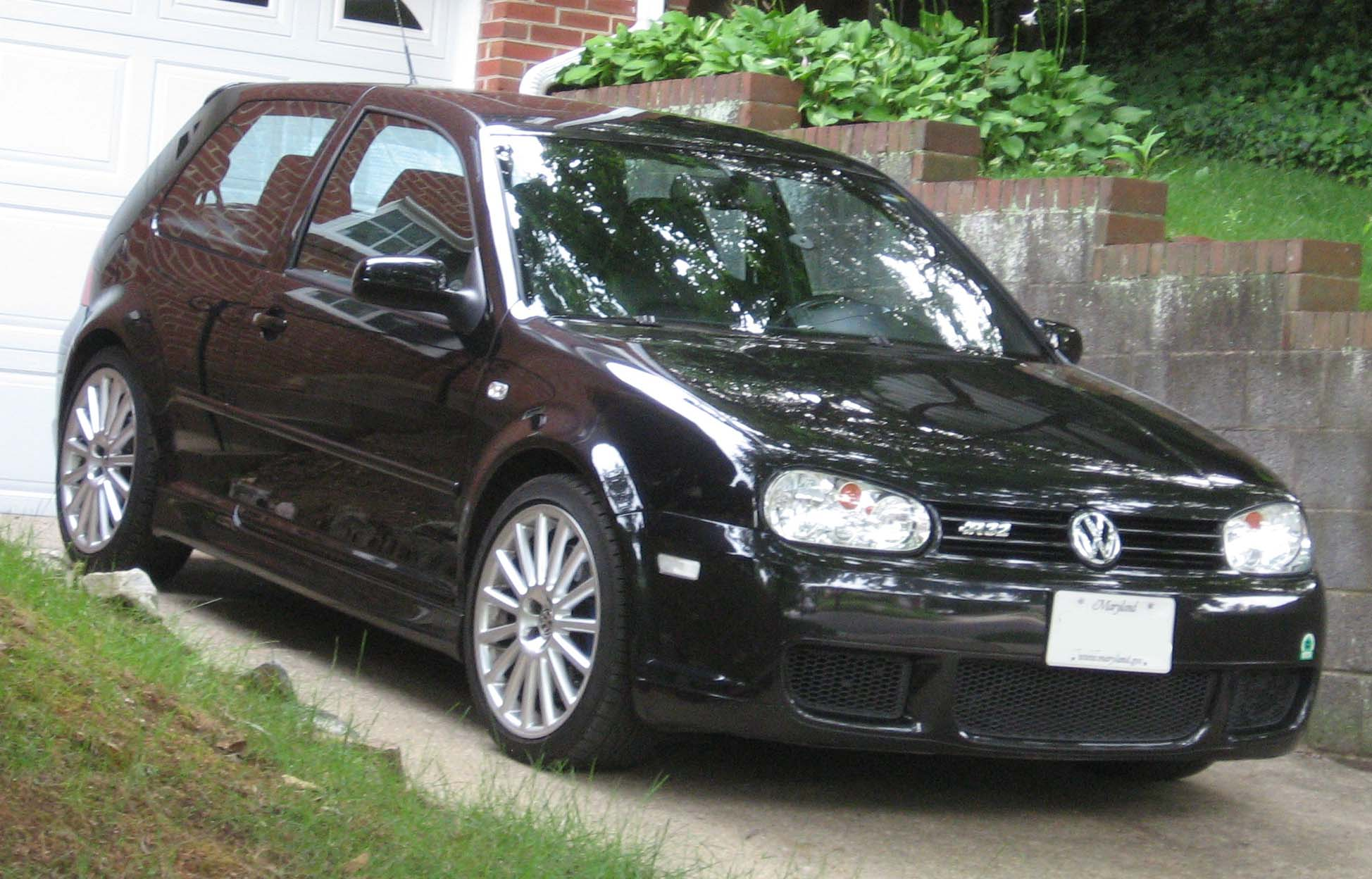
2003 VW Golf R32

Volkswagen began production of the Mk4 R32 in 2002, for the 2003 model year. It was the world's first production car with a dual-clutch gearbox (DSG) — available for the German market. Due to unexpected popularity, Volkswagen decided to sell the car in the United States and Australia as the 2004 model year Volkswagen R32. Billed as the pinnacle of the Golf IV platform, the R32 included every performance, safety, and luxury feature Volkswagen had to offer, including the all new 3,189 cc (3.2 L; 194.6 cu in) DOHC 4 valves per cylinder VR6 engine (ID codes: BFH/BML), which produced a rated motive power output of 241 PS (238 bhp; 177 kW) at 6,250 rpm and 320 N⋅m (236 lb⋅ft) at 2,800 rpm of torque. Further additions included Haldex Traction-based 4motion on-demand four-wheel drive system, a new six-speed manual transmission, independent rear suspension, Climatronic automatic climate control, sport seats from König with R32 badging, 18" OZ Aristo alloy wheels (Ronal produced the wheels towards the end of production), Electronic Stability Programme, larger 334 mm (13.1 in) disc brakes with gloss blue painted calipers, sunroof (for the US), Xenon Headlamps (for Europa), and model-specific bodywork additions.

=== Golf R32 (Mk5) ===
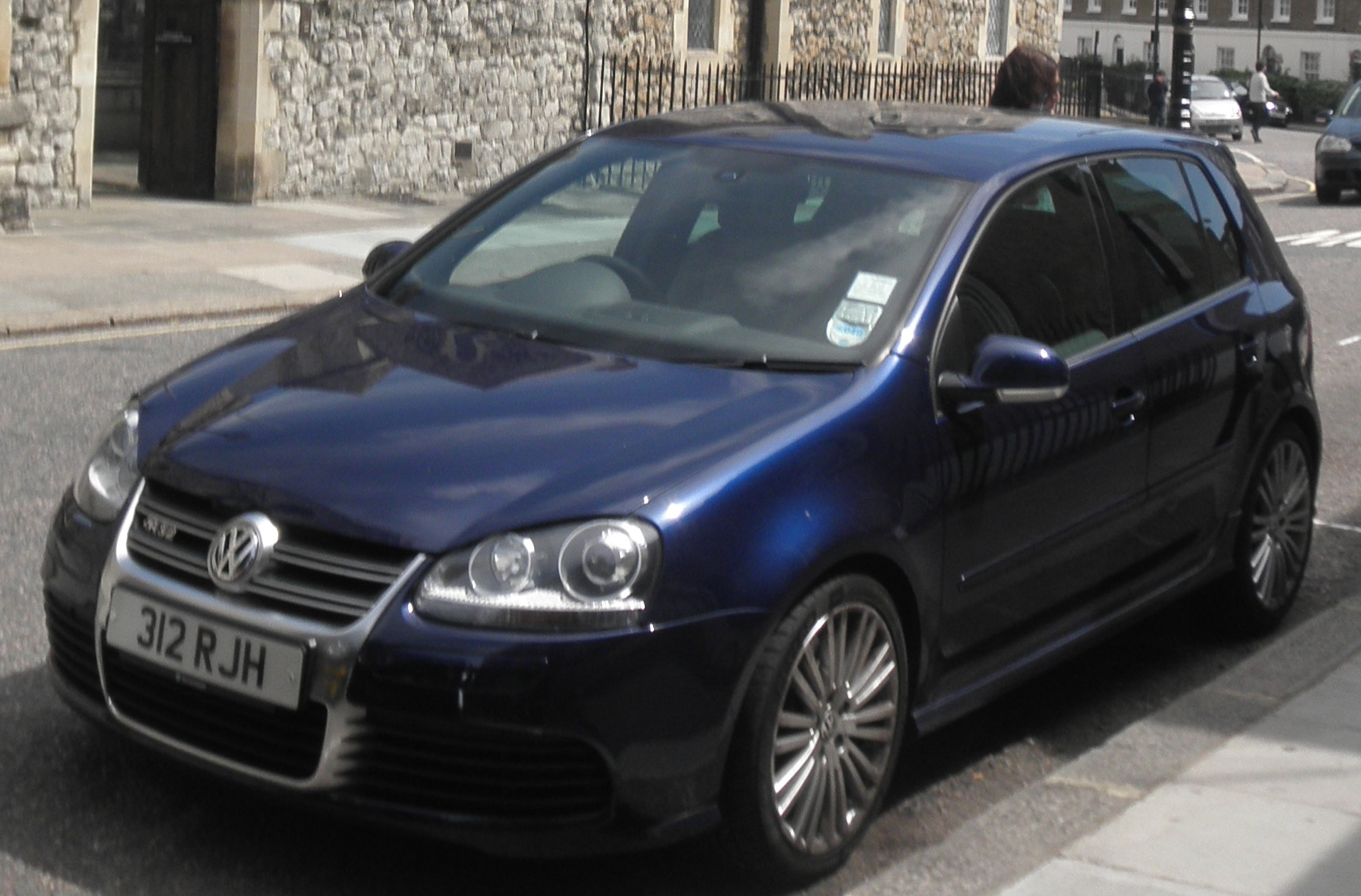
2008 VW Golf R32

In September 2005, the Mk5 R32 went on sale in Europe. United Kingdom sales began in November that year. It features an updated 3.2-litre VR6 engine of that fitted to the previous Mk4 version, with an extra 10 PS (7 kW; 10 bhp) due to a reworked inlet manifold. Maximum power is now 250 PS (184 kW; 247 bhp) at 6,300 rpm; torque is unchanged at 320 N⋅m (236 lbf⋅ft). It reaches an electronically governed top speed of 250 km/h (155.3 mph). Going from 0 to 100 km/h (62 mph) will take 6.5 s, reduced to 6.2 s with the Direct-Shift Gearbox.

Compared with the previous Mk4 R32, it is 0.1 seconds faster for the manual version, while the newer R32 is about 40 kg (88.2 lb) heavier. As with the previous R32; there is the Haldex Traction-based 4motion part-time four-wheel drive, now through 18" Zolder 20-spoke alloy wheels. Stopping the R32 comes in the form of blue-painted brake calipers with 345 mm (13.58 in) discs at the front and 310 mm (12.20 in) disks at the rear.

The Mk5 R32 was released in the US in August 2007 with a limited production run of 5000. Each R32 has its production number laser etched on its steering wheel.

In Chile, the Golf Mk5 was only offered in this model. Only the Brazilian-made Mk4 was sold.

=== Golf R (Mk6) ===
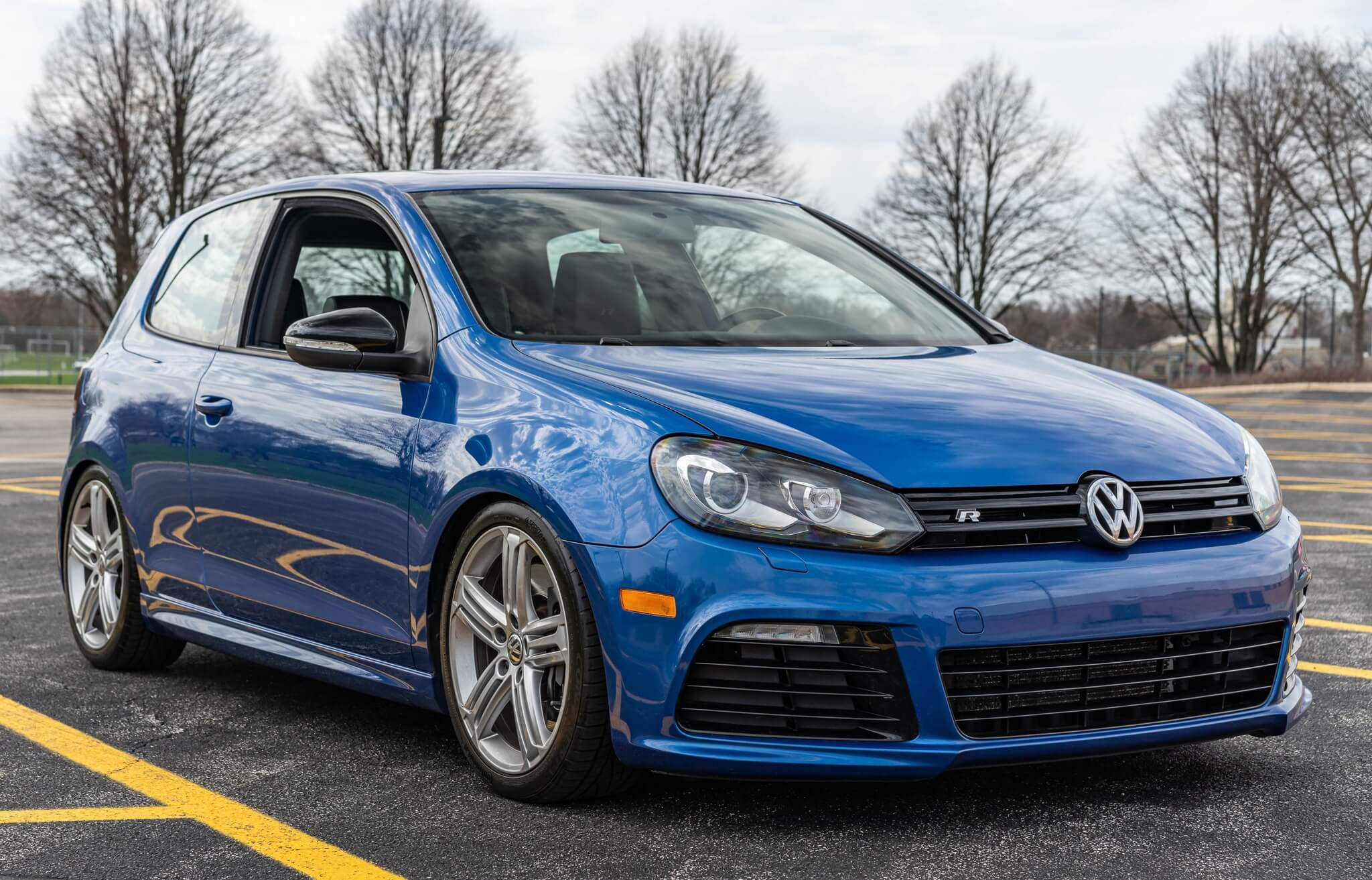
2012 Golf R, Rising Blue Metallic

The MK6 Golf R was sold from 2012–2013, and was the first 'R' model to feature a turbocharged 2.0L FSI engine and direct injection. The EA113 TFSI engine was brought forward from the previous generation MK5 Jetta/GTI/Passat, with some technical changes. The EA113 'R' variant produced 257 PS (189 kW; 253 bhp) and 330 N⋅m (243 lbf⋅ft) with the addition of a K04 turbocharger/exhaust manifold module from BorgWarner, larger direct injectors, optimized camshafts, and a larger charge air cooler.

The MK6 Golf R was offered with both a 6-speed manual transmission as well as a 6-speed Direct Shift Gearbox, although only the manual version was offered in North America. 0 to 100 km/h (62 mph) time was 5.8 seconds, 0.7 seconds faster than the previous 'R' model Golf. The 3390lb curb weight is only 7lbs lighter than the previous generation.

A fourth-generation Haldex unit was used in the MK6R, allowing a nearly endless torque split between front and rear axles.

=== Passat R36 (B6) ===
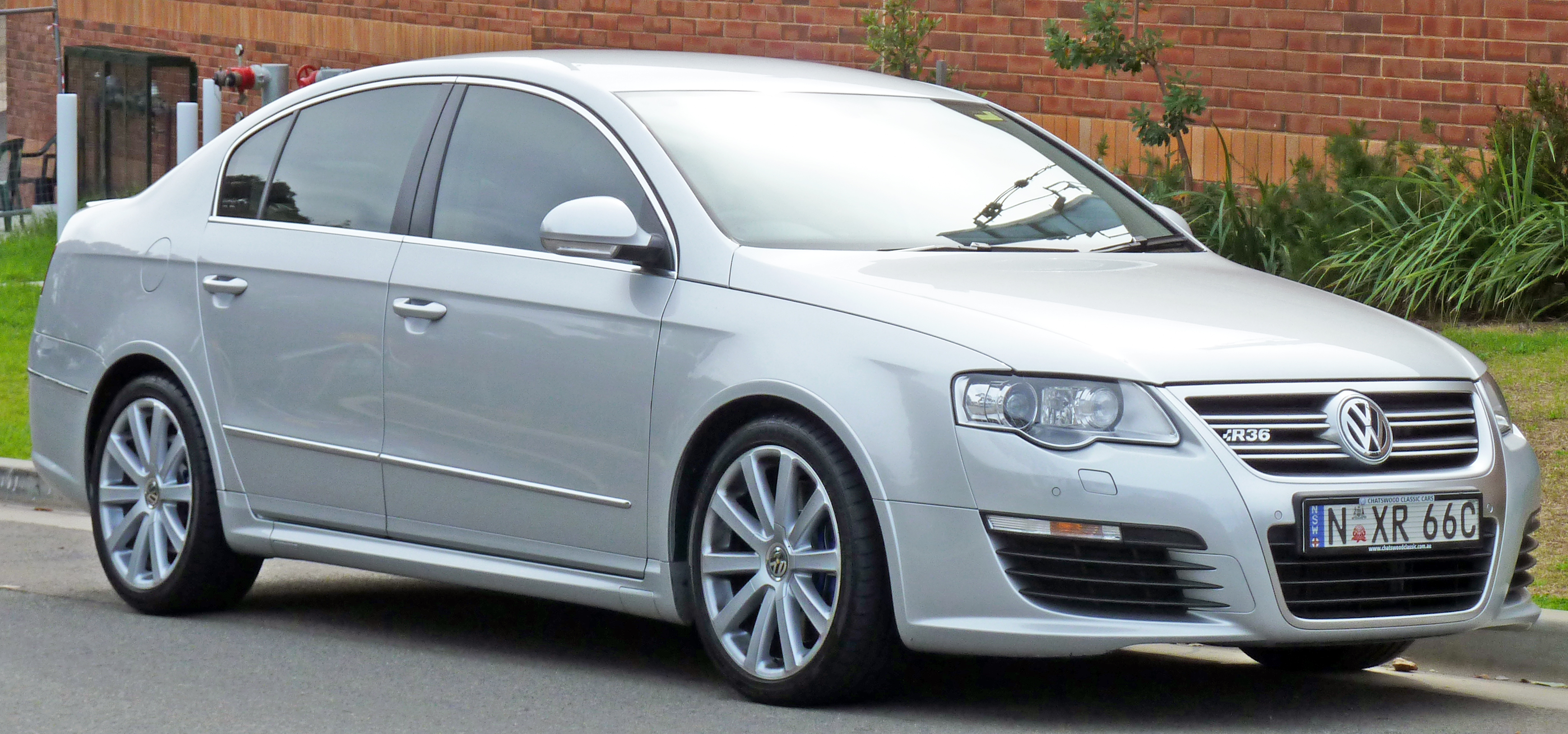
2008 VW Passat R36

At the Frankfurt Motor Show in September 2007, Volkswagen launched the 'R line' R36, created by Volkswagen Individual GmbH.

The R36 uses a 3.6 litre VR6 engine rated 300 PS (221 kW; 296 bhp) and 350 N⋅m (258 lbf⋅ft) of torque, which pushes the saloon and Variant (estate/wagon) to 100 km/h (62.1 mph) in 5.6 and 5.8 seconds respectively. The name "R36" is derived from the engine displacement, 3.6-litres.

The R36 features redesigned front and rear spoilers, 4 wheel drive, DSG gearbox with paddleshift on the flat-bottom steering wheel, 18" Omanyt aluminium alloy wheels, 20 mm (0.8 in) lowered suspension, 'R' engraved stainless steel pedals, Recaro seats with R36 logo, heated front and rear seats, Bi-Xenon headlights with cornering function, and twin rear muffler tailpipes.

=== Touareg R50 (7L) ===
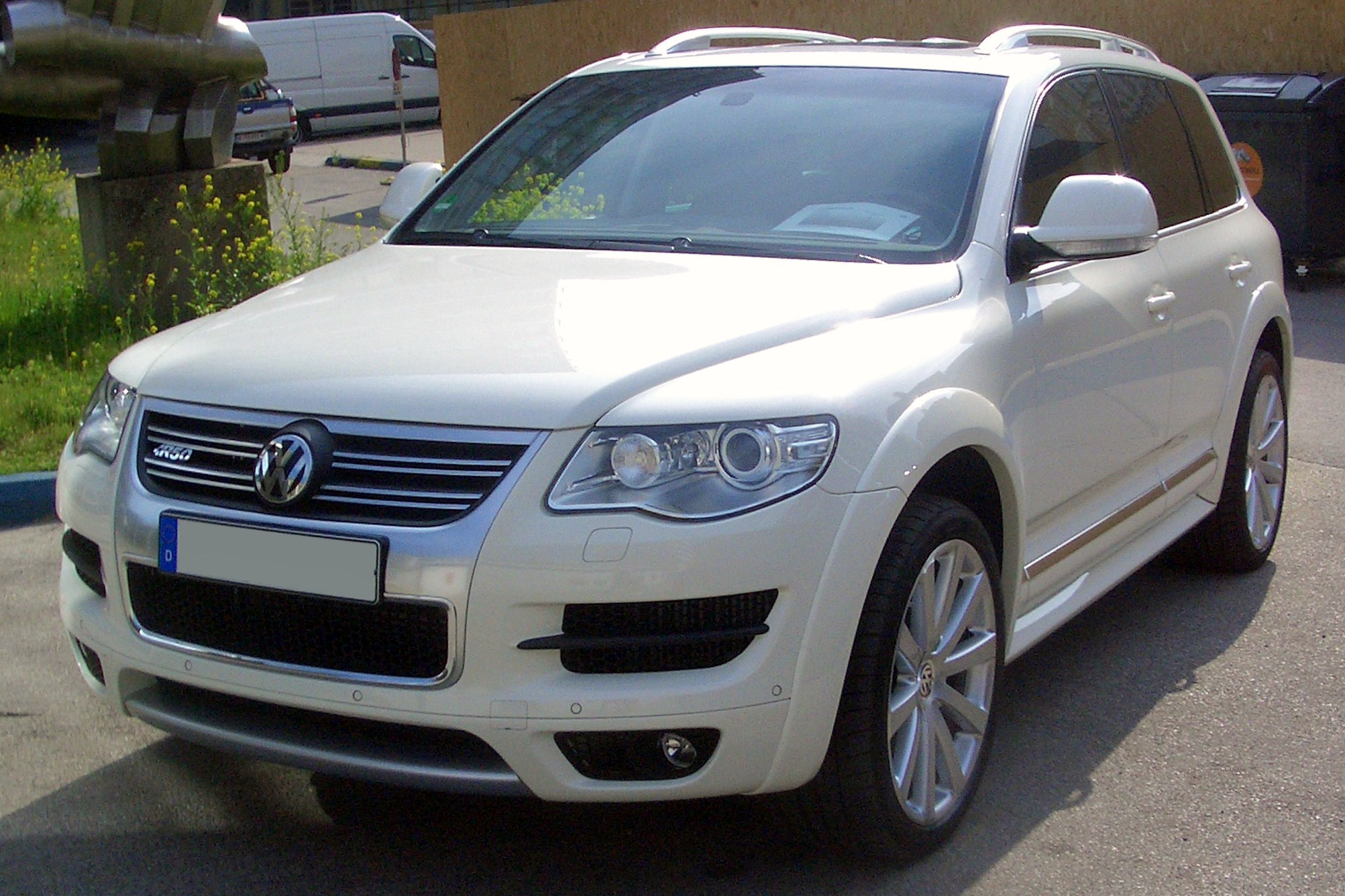
2008 VW Touareg R50

The Touareg R50 is the third Volkswagen after the Golf and Passat to be given the 'R' treatment by Volkswagen Individual GmbH. The R50 global launch was at the 2007 Australian International Motor Show.

The "R50" naming comes from the engine displacement: 5.0 L. The R50 was offered with a 5.0-litre V10 diesel engine that produces 257 kW (349 PS; 345 bhp) and 850 N⋅m (627 lbf⋅ft) of torque, pushing the car from 0 to 100 km/h (62.1 mph) in 6.7 seconds.

=== Scirocco R (Mk. 3) ===
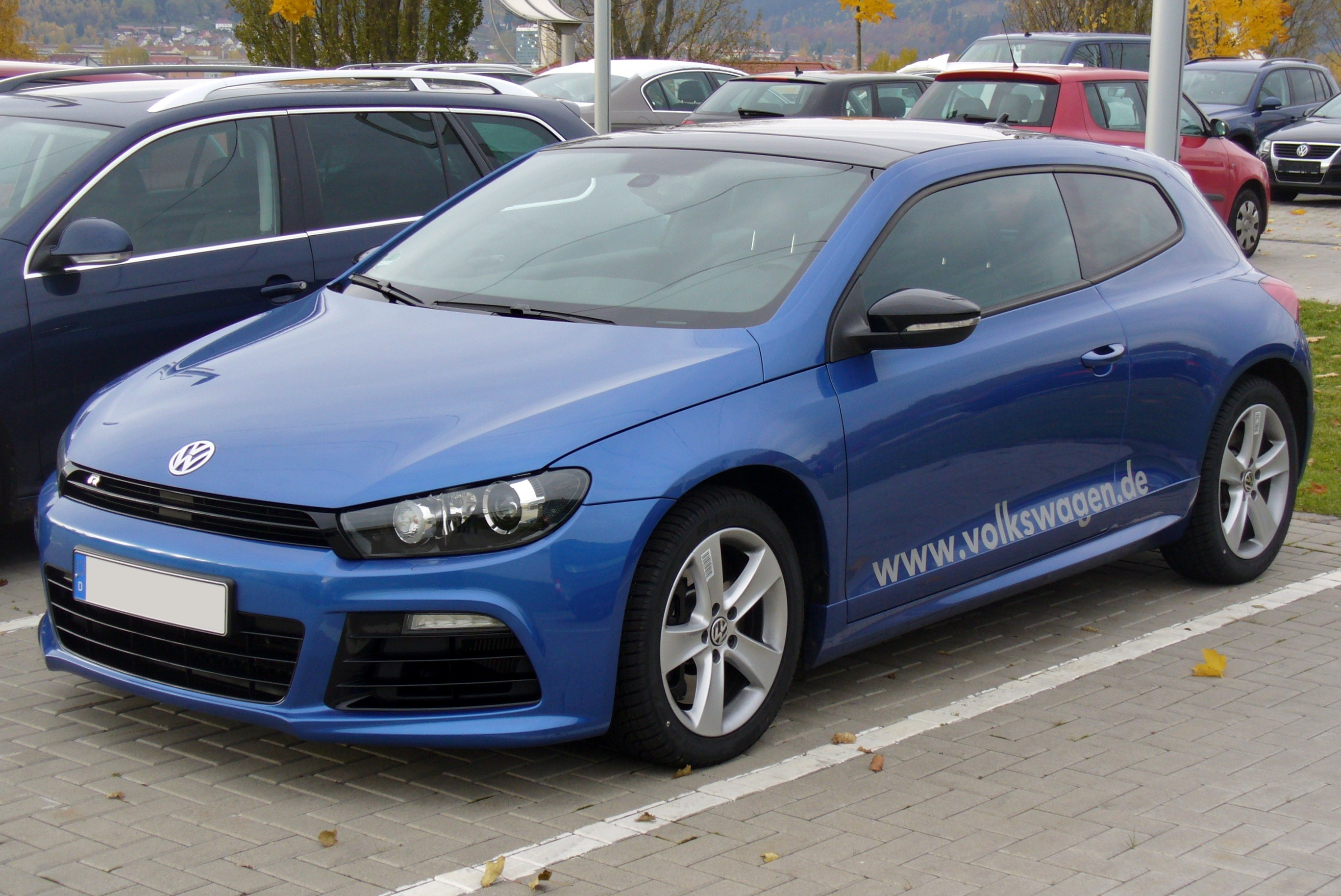
2010 Scirocco R

The Volkswagen Scirocco R was introduced in 2009, powered by a 2.0L TSI turbocharged Inline 4, based on new the 2 door Scirocco coupe introduced the year prior. The Scirocco R model featured a body kit exclusive to the model, with a much larger front opening than the mainstream Scirocco. The model was retired alongside the Scirocco nameplate in 2017.

=== Golf R (Mk7) ===
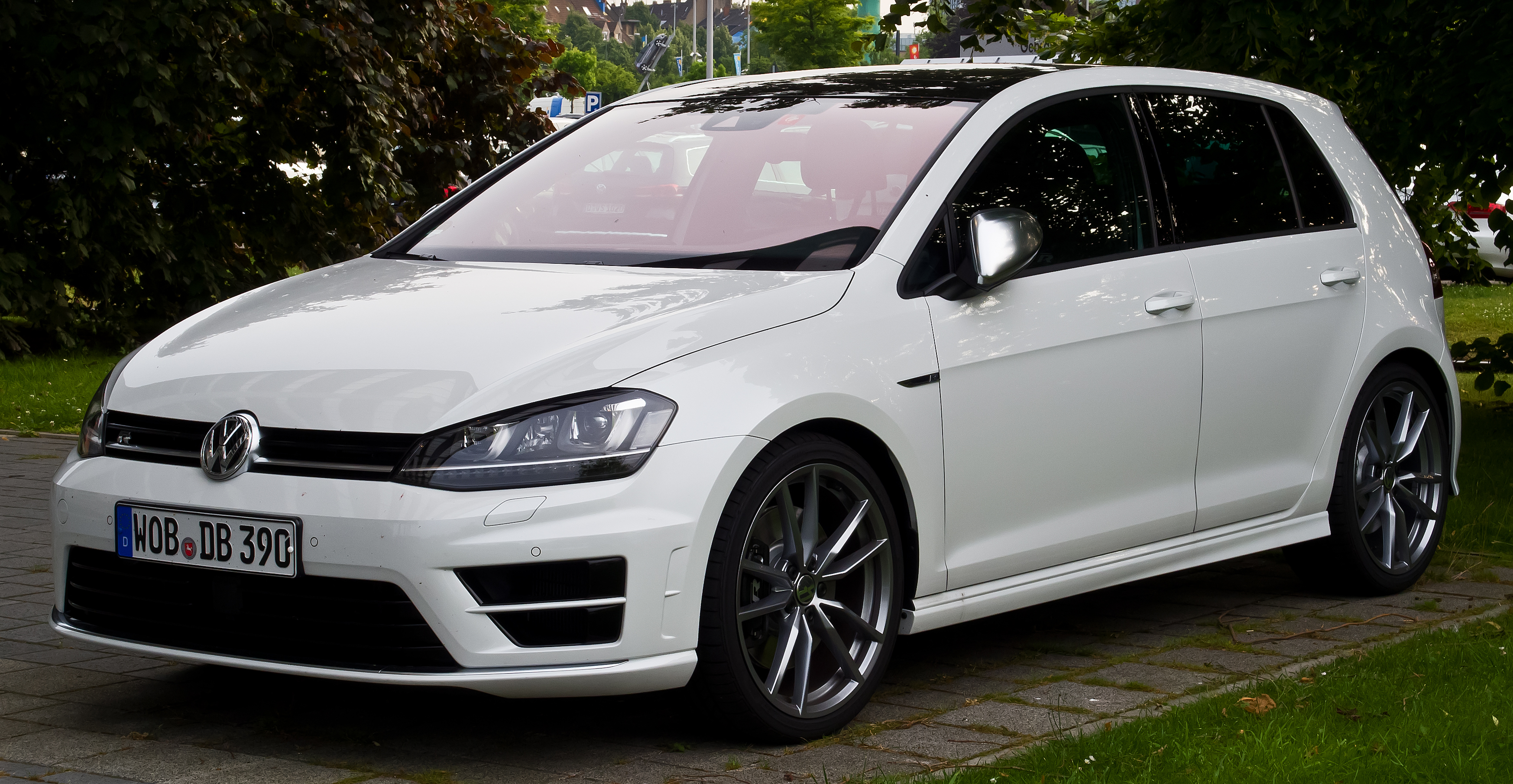
2014 VW Golf R

Like the GTI, the Golf R is also built as a three- or five-door hatchback or five-door wagon. It is powered by a newly developed version of the 1,984 cc (2.0 L; 121.1 cu in) turbocharged EA888 petrol FSI inline-four engine used in the latest Golf GTI (and Audi S3), but in this application producing 300 PS (296 bhp; 221 kW) (206 kW (280 PS; 276 bhp) for "hot climate" markets such as Australia, Japan, USA) from 5,500 to 6,200 rpm and 380 N⋅m (280 lb⋅ft) from 1,800 to 5,500 rpm of torque. Compared to the GTI's powerplant, the Golf R's engine has a modified cylinder head, exhaust valves, valve seats and springs, pistons, injection valves and larger intercooler and turbocharger. DSG equipped models also come with an auxiliary oil cooler on the passenger side.

=== T-Roc R ===
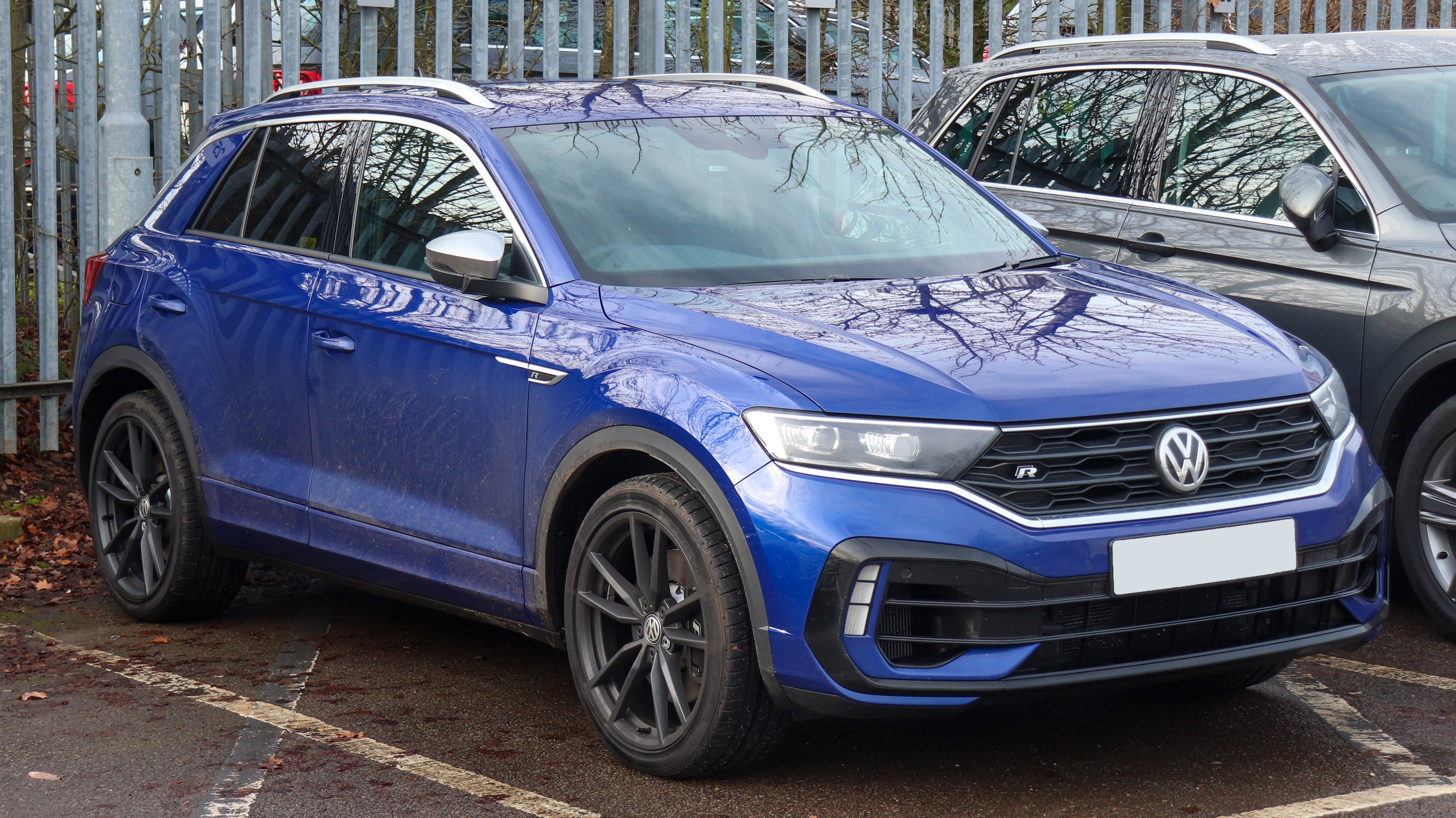
2019 VW T-Roc R

The T-Roc R was released in March 2019. It is the first SUV tuned by Volkswagen R. The T-Roc R shares the all-wheel drive powertrain from the Golf R, including the engine which is a turbocharged 300 PS (296 bhp; 221 kW) 2.0-litre four-cylinder engine mated to a 7-speed DSG automatic.

=== Tiguan R ===
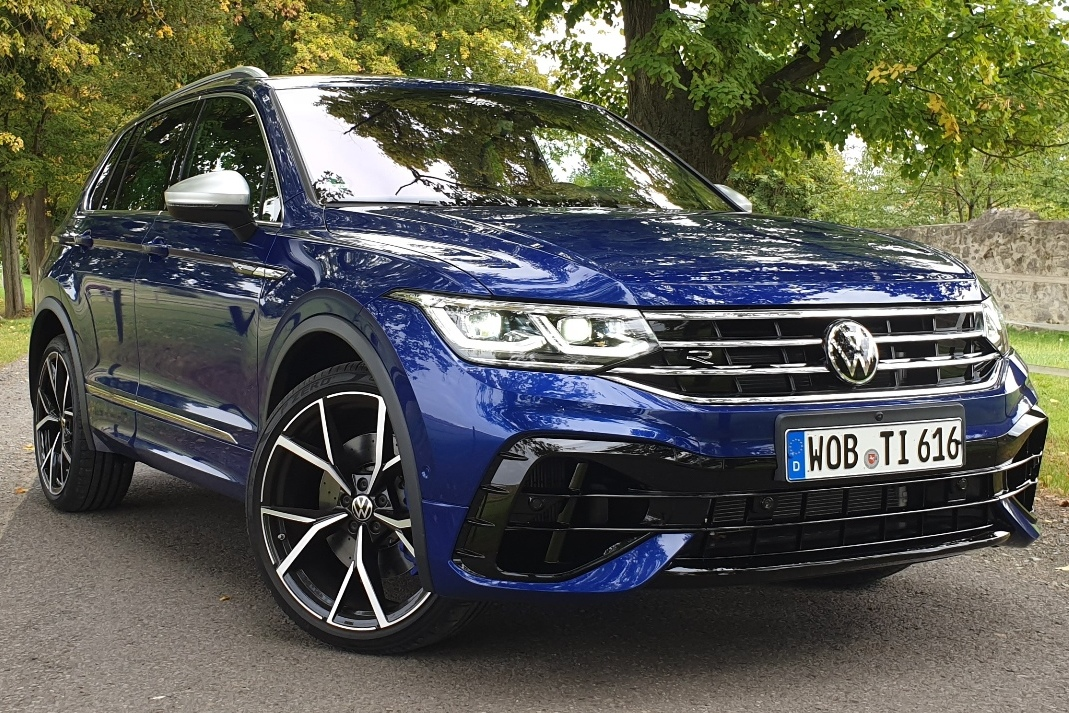
2020 VW Tiguan R

The Tiguan R was released in June 2020 alongside the facelifted model. It is powered by a new 2.0-liter turbocharged inline-4 that delivers 320 PS (235 kW; 316 hp) and 420 N⋅m (310 lb⋅ft), shared with the Arteon R and the Mk8 Golf R. The engine is mated to an all-wheel-drive system which has the ability to split torque between the axles and between the rear wheels. Other performance upgrades of the Tiguan R include lowered suspension, 21-inch wheels, uprated brakes, and an available Akrapovič exhaust. A driving mode selector is included complete with a “Race” setting which can be prompted by a dedicated button on the steering wheel.

=== Arteon R ===
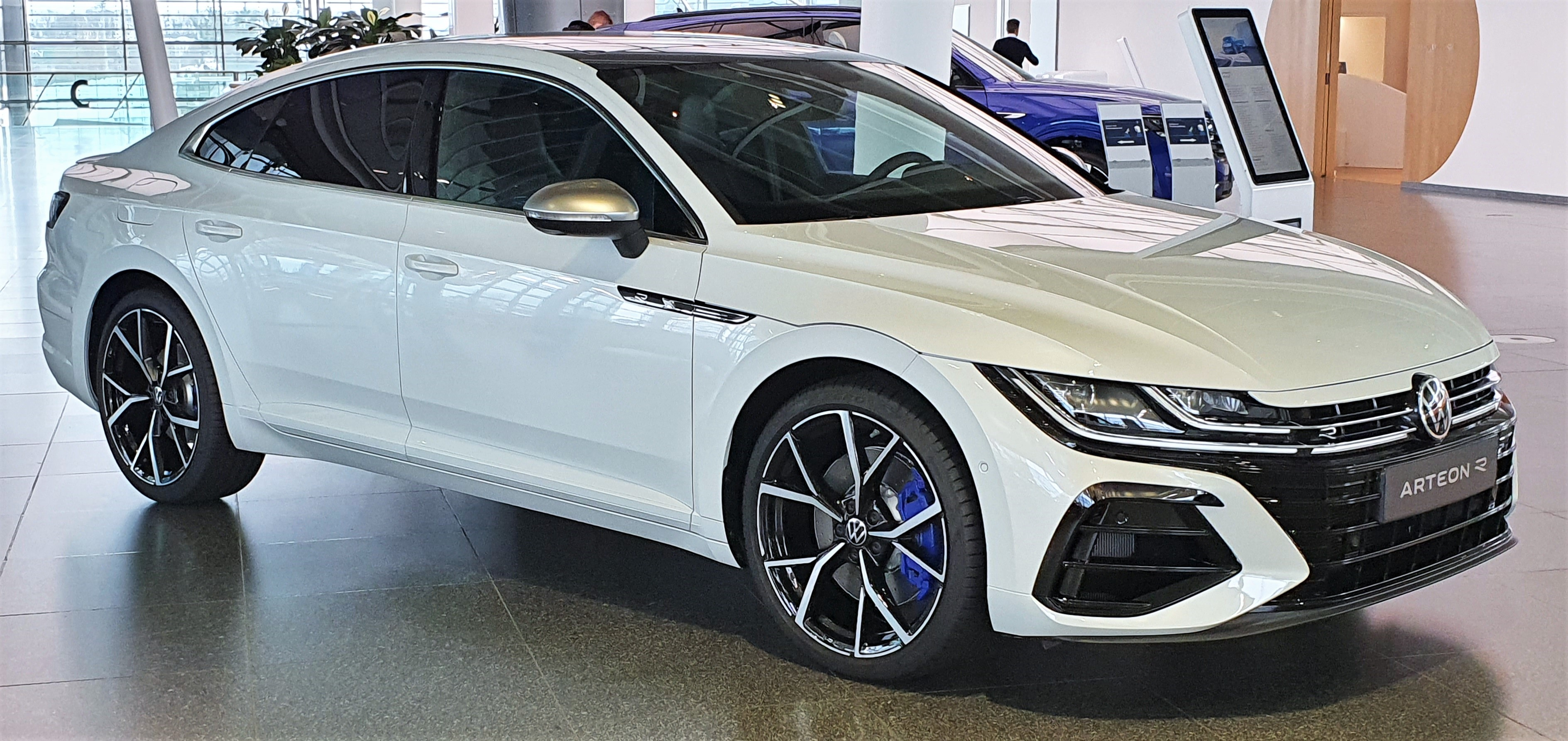
VW Arteon R

The Arteon R was released in 2020 alongside the facelifted model and variant version.

=== Golf R (Mk8) ===
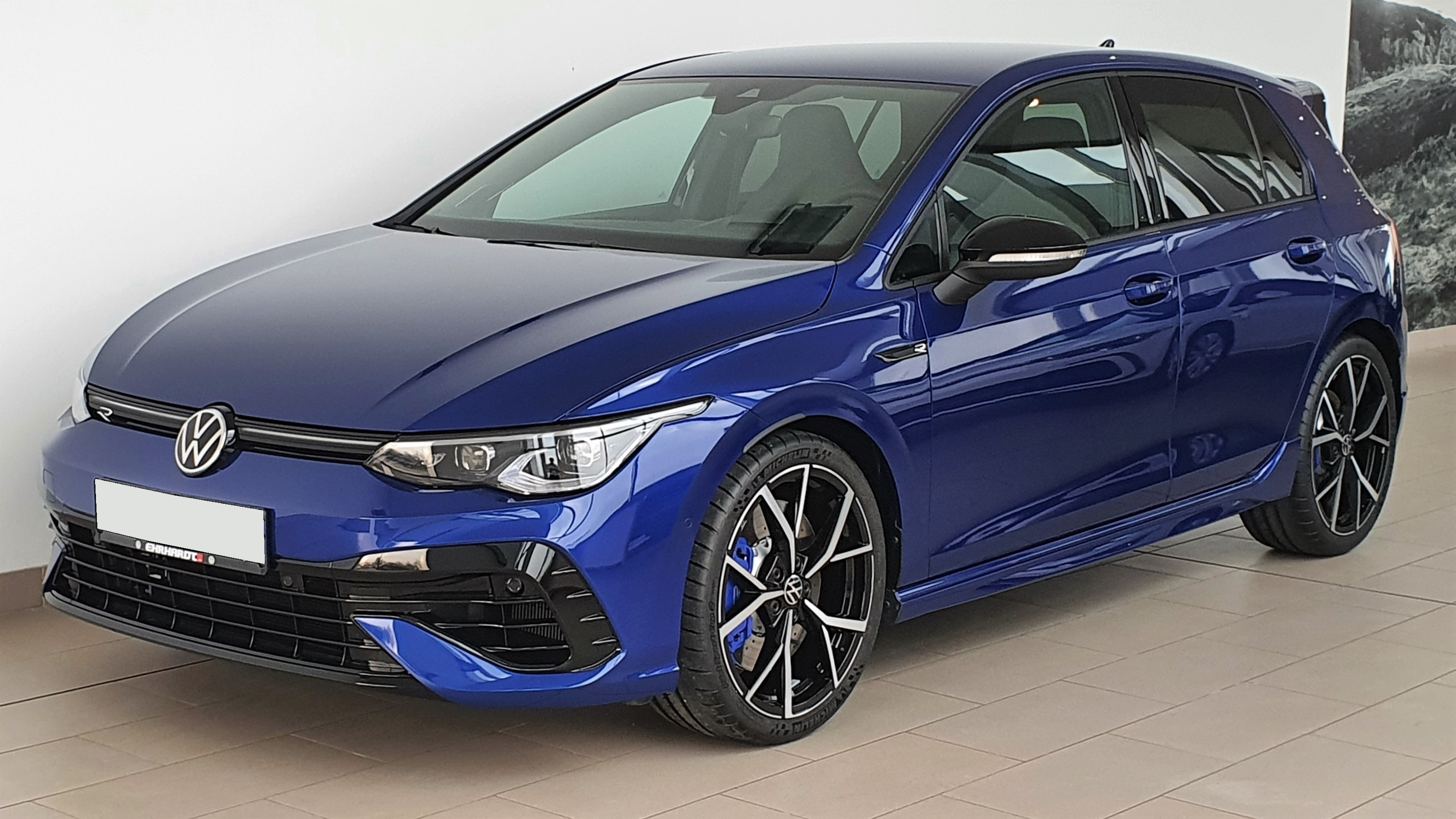
VW Golf R

Like the GTI, the Golf R is also built as a five-door hatchback. It is powered by a newly developed version of the 1,984 cc (2.0 L; 121.1 cu in) turbocharged EA888 petrol FSI Inline-four engine used in the latest Golf GTI (and Audi S3), but in this application producing 300 PS (296 bhp; 221 kW) (206 kW (280 PS; 276 bhp) for "hot climate" markets such as Australia, Japan, USA) from 5,500 to 6,200 rpm and 380 N⋅m (280 lb⋅ft) from 1,800 to 5,500 rpm of torque. Compared to the GTI's powerplant, the Golf R's engine has a modified cylinder head, exhaust valves, valve seats and springs, pistons, injection valves and larger intercooler and turbocharger. DSG equipped models also come with an auxiliary oil cooler on passenger side.

== R-Line ==
Volkswagen began offering the R-Line trim level in 2010, being first introduced on the Volkswagen Passat B6. R-Line vehicles consist of sport upgrades that are mostly cosmetic, such as different bumpers and wheels.

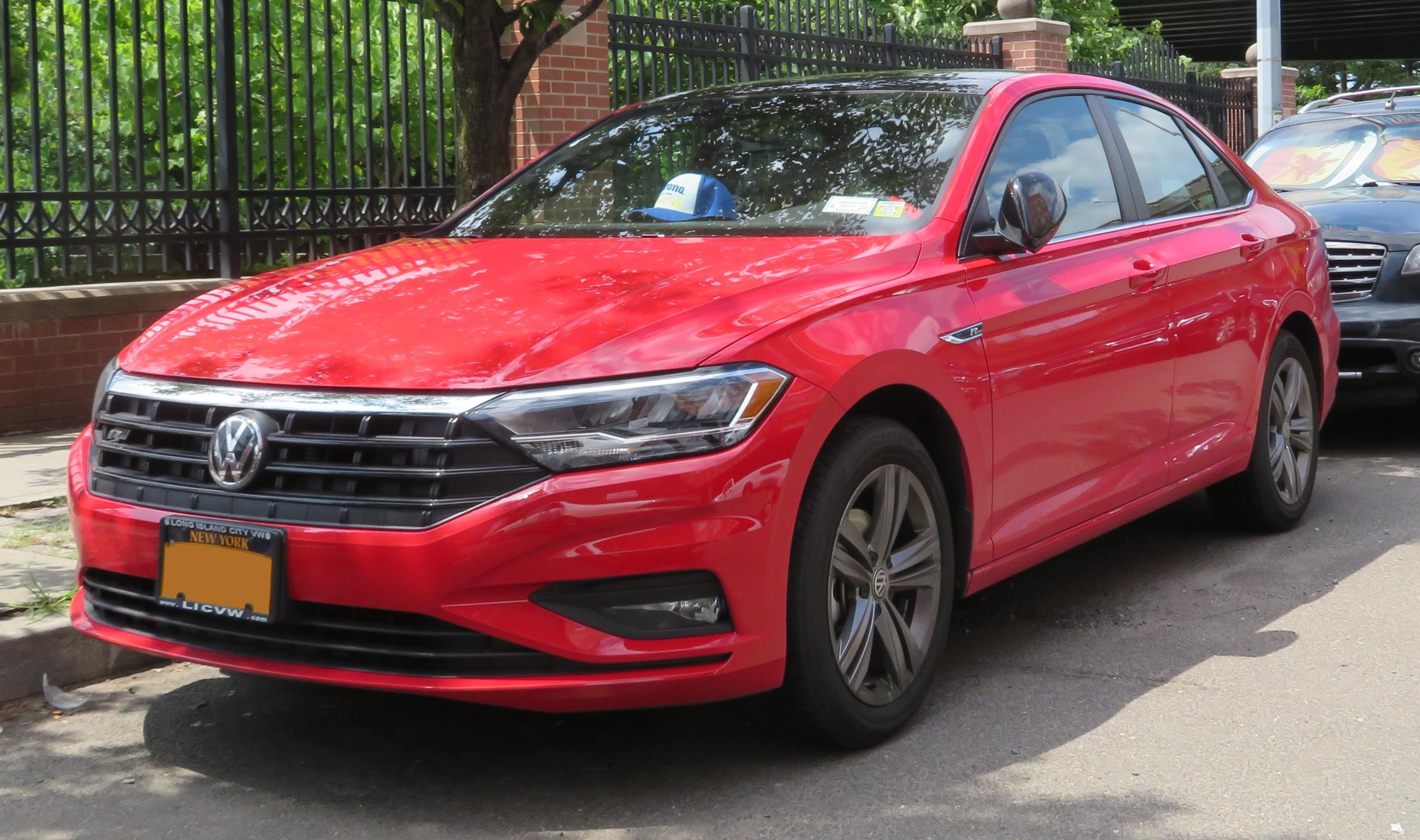
VW Jetta R-Line

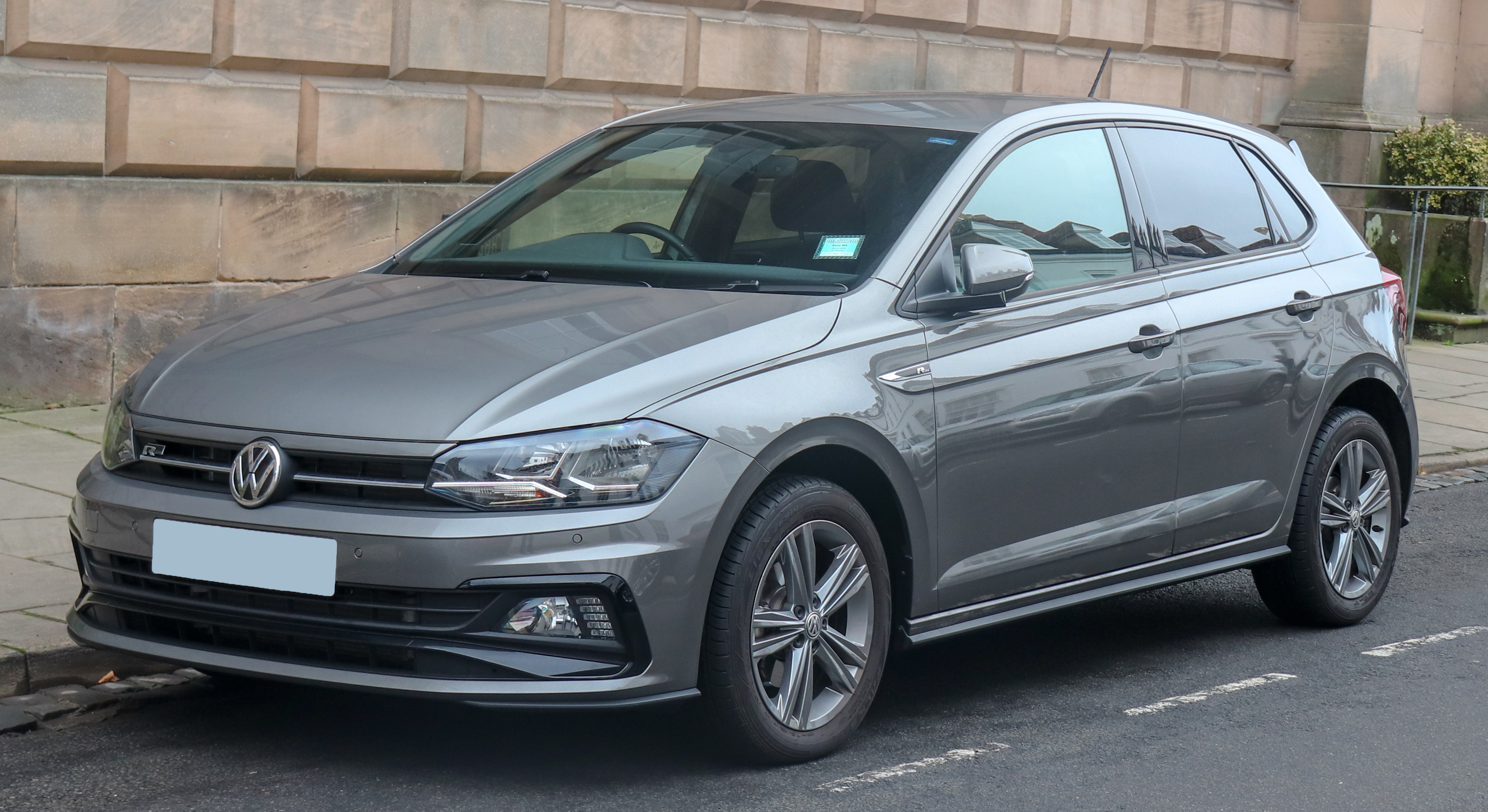
VW Polo R-Line

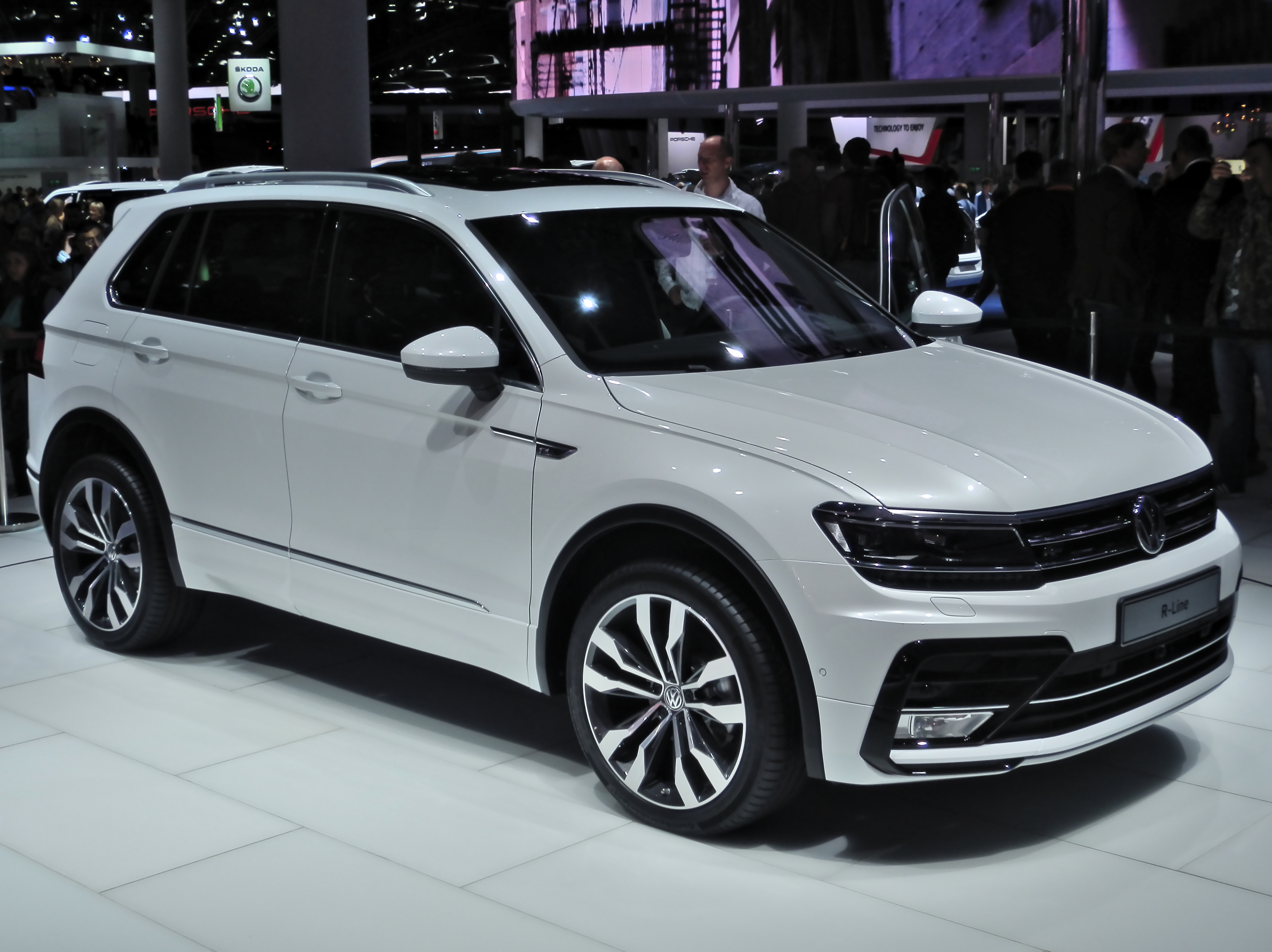
VW Tiguan R-Line

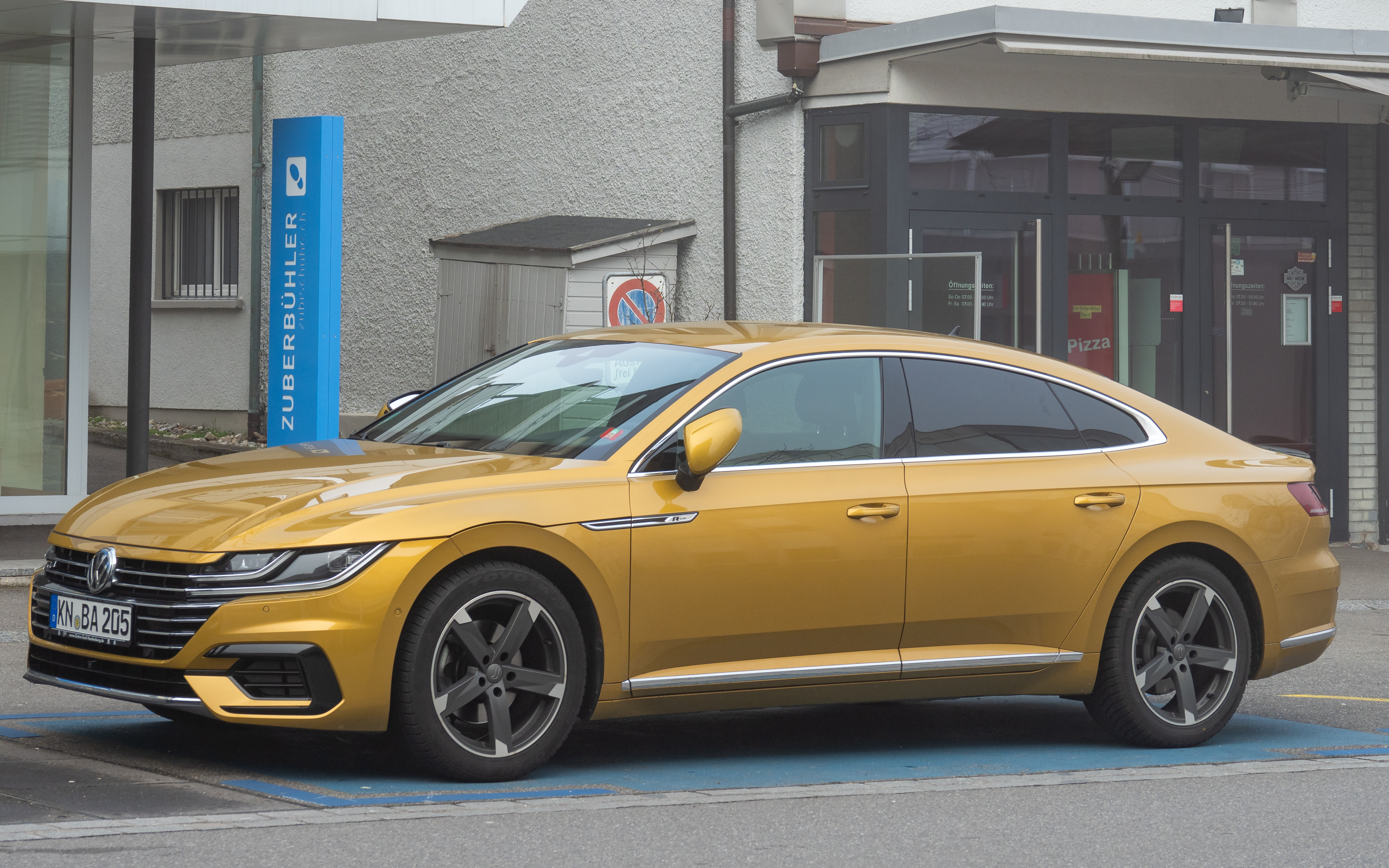
VW Arteon R-Line

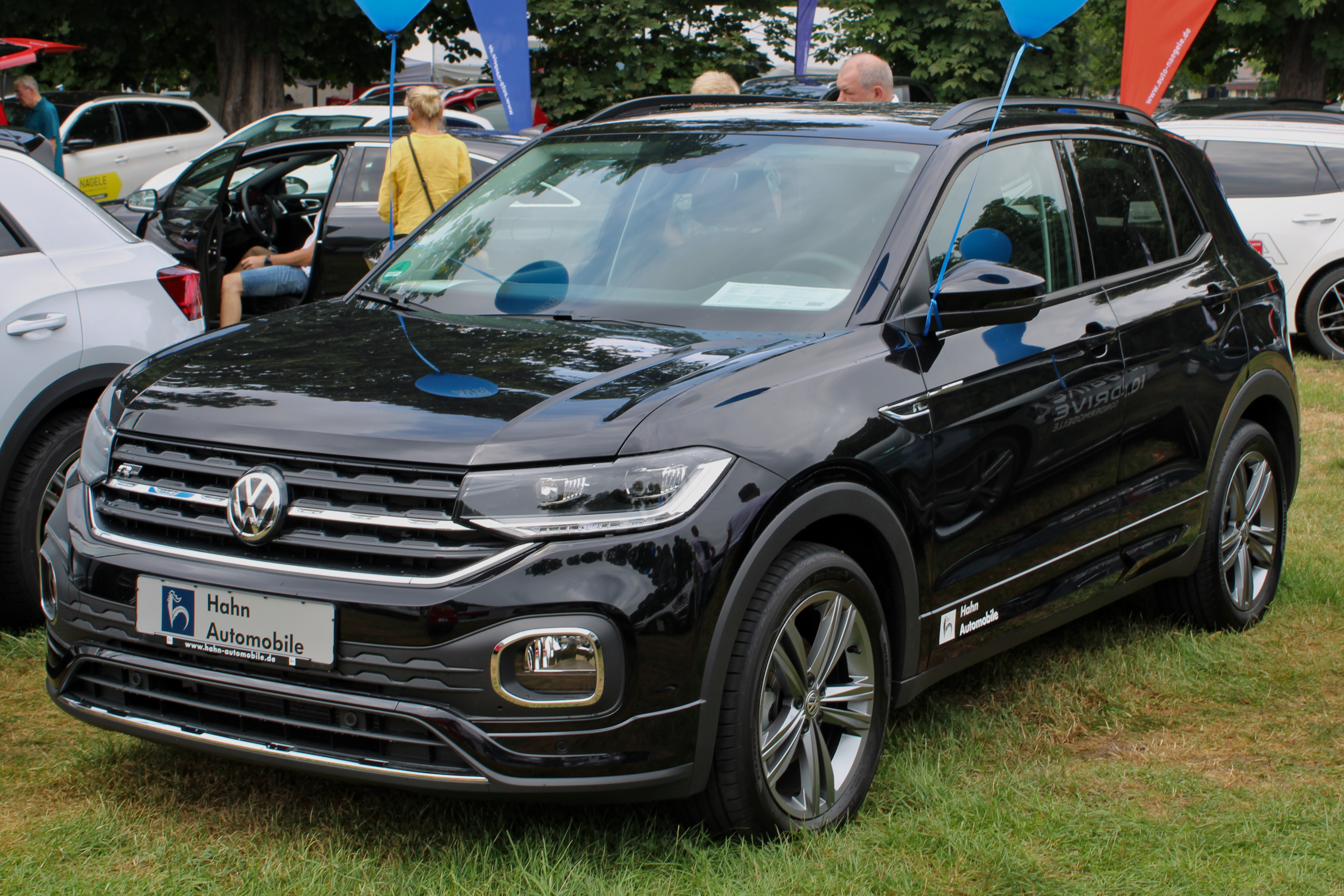
VW T-Cross R-Line

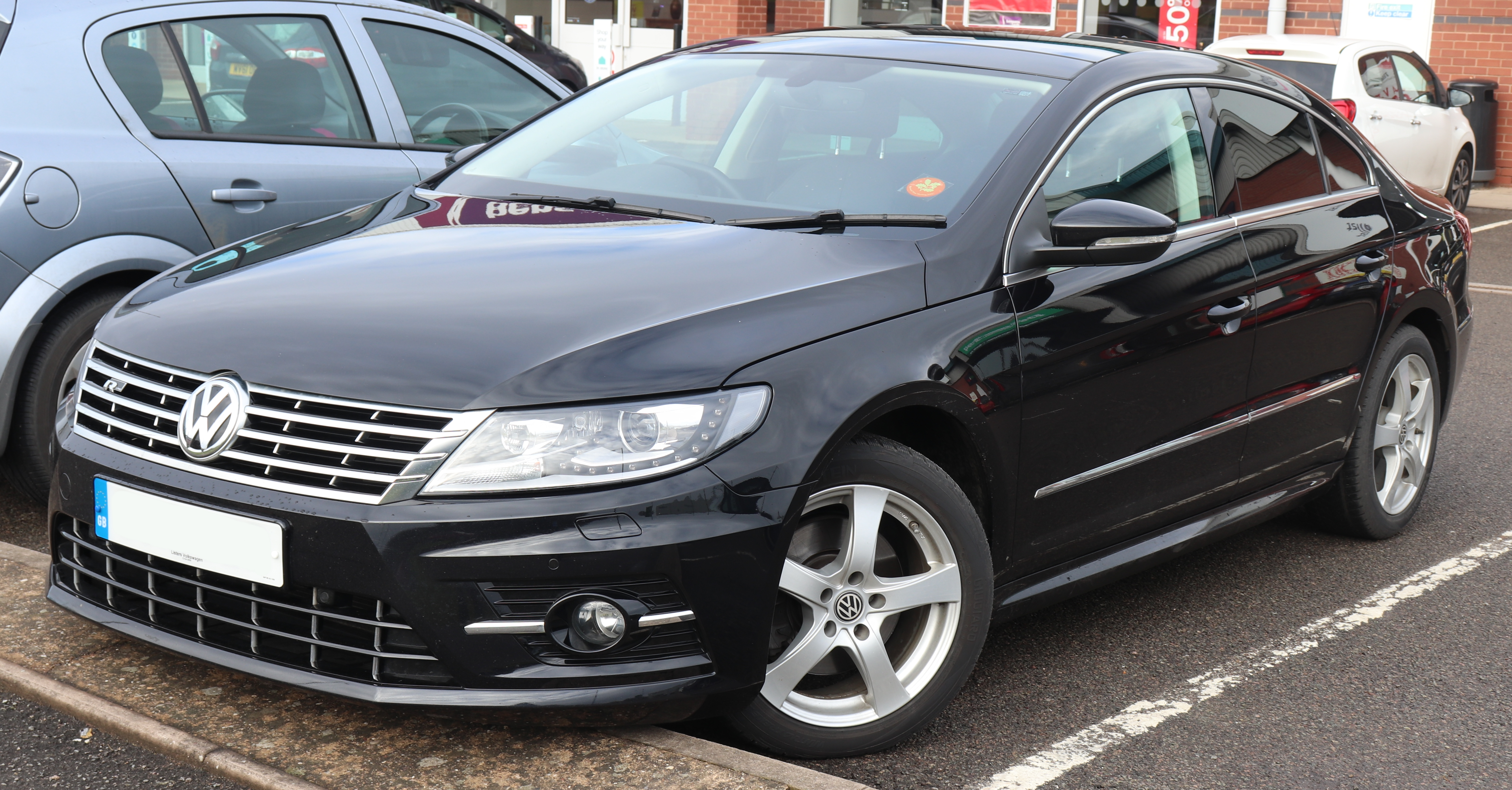
VW CC R-Line

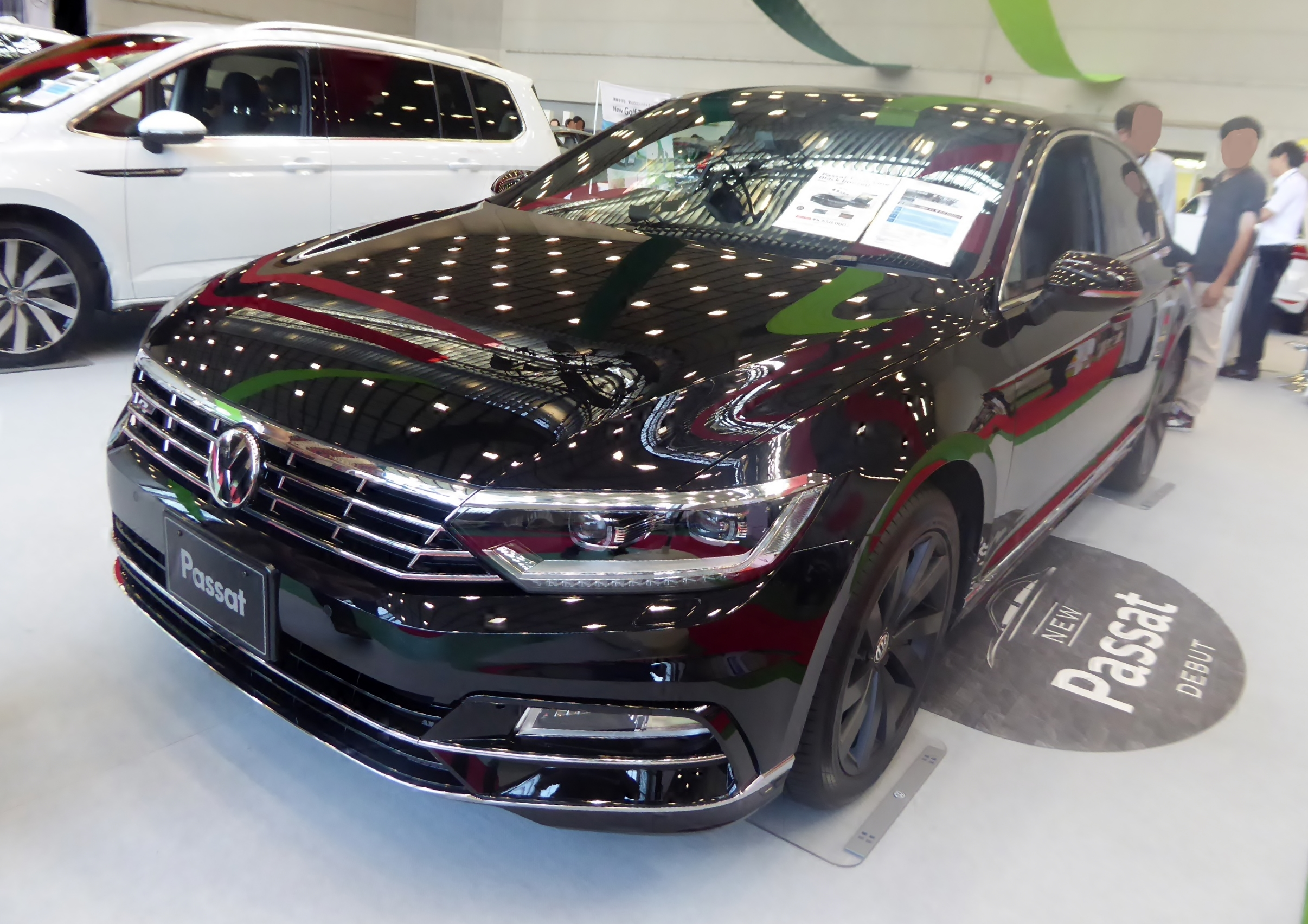
VW Passat R-Line

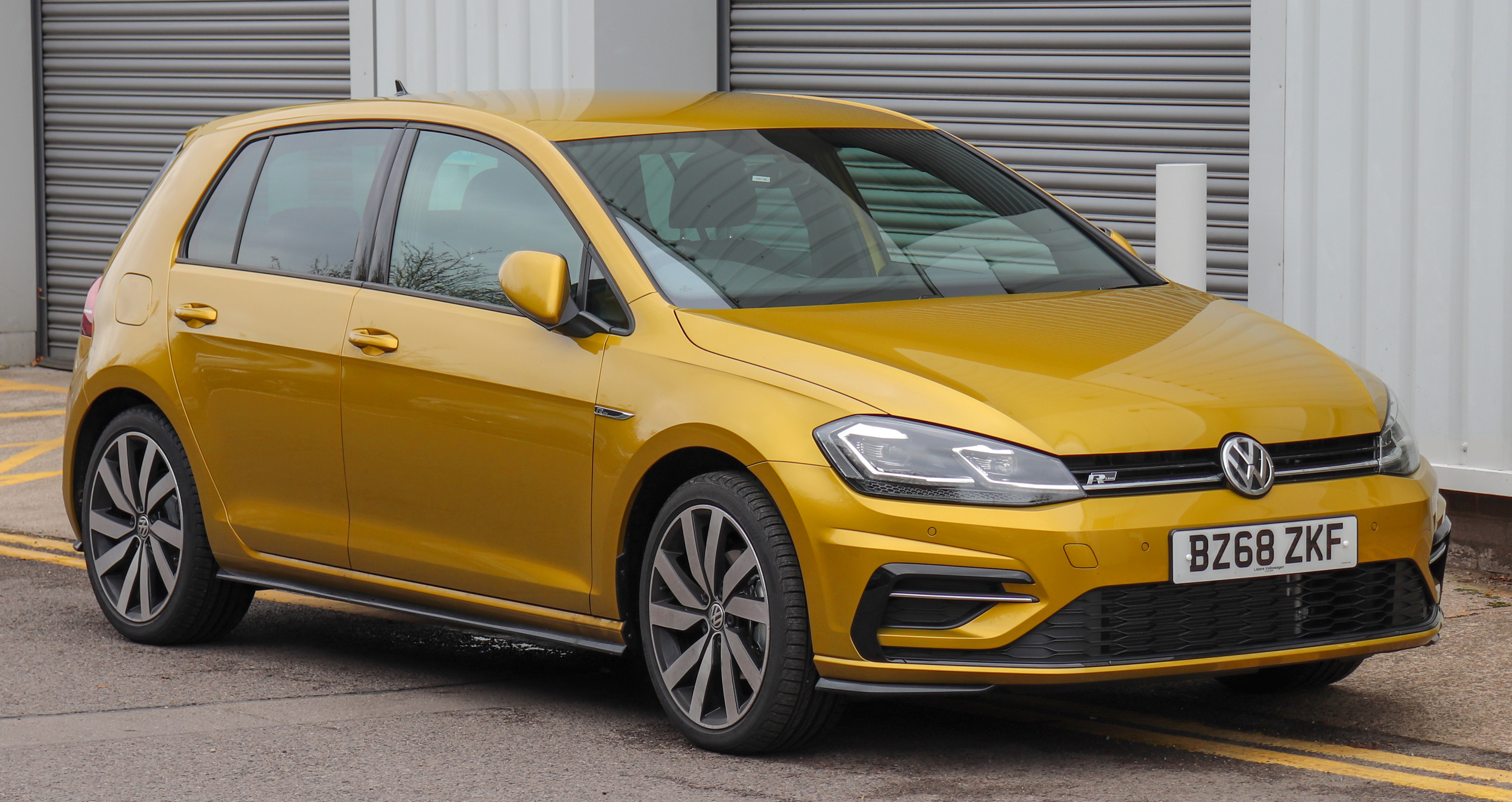
VW Golf R-Line

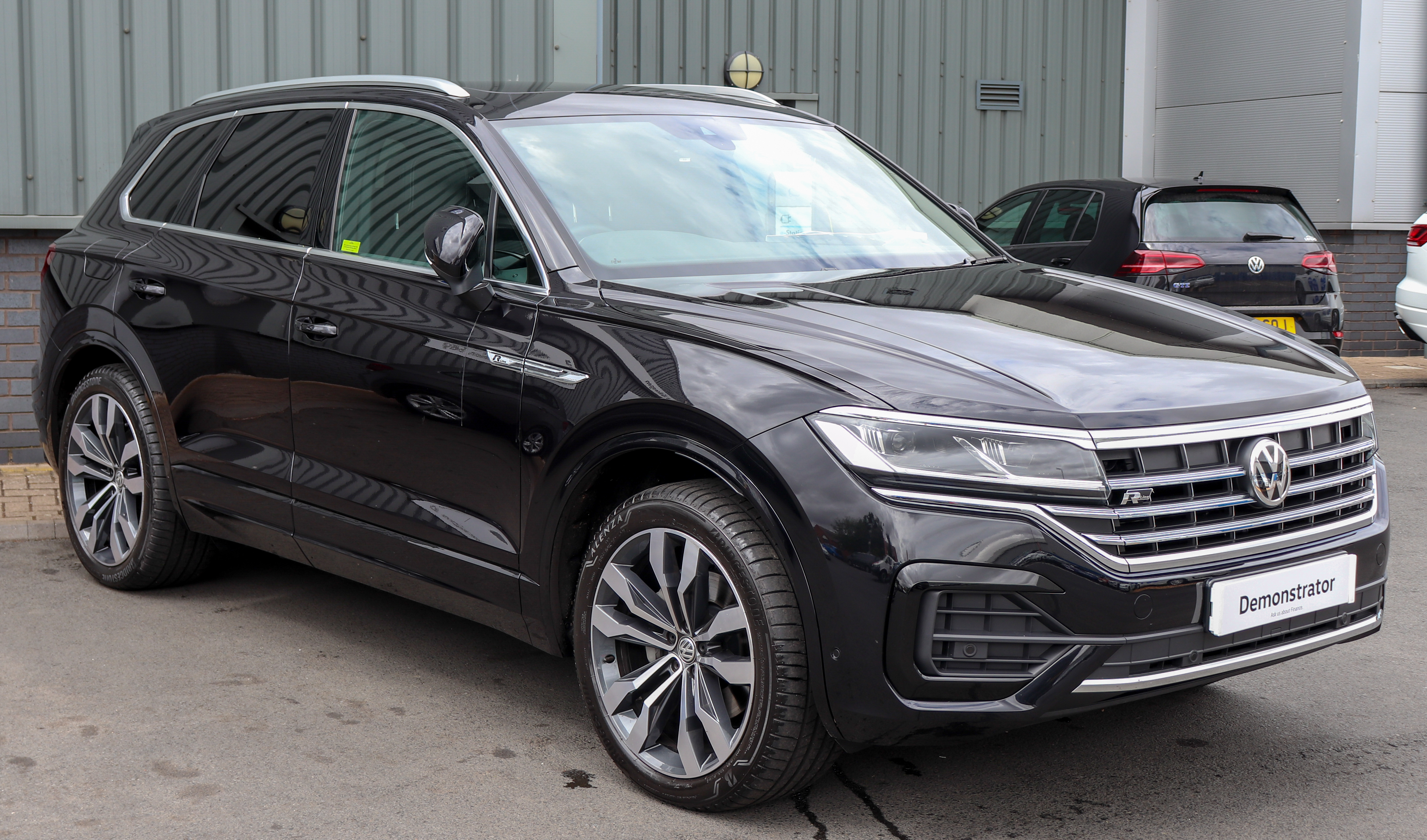
VW Touareg R-Line

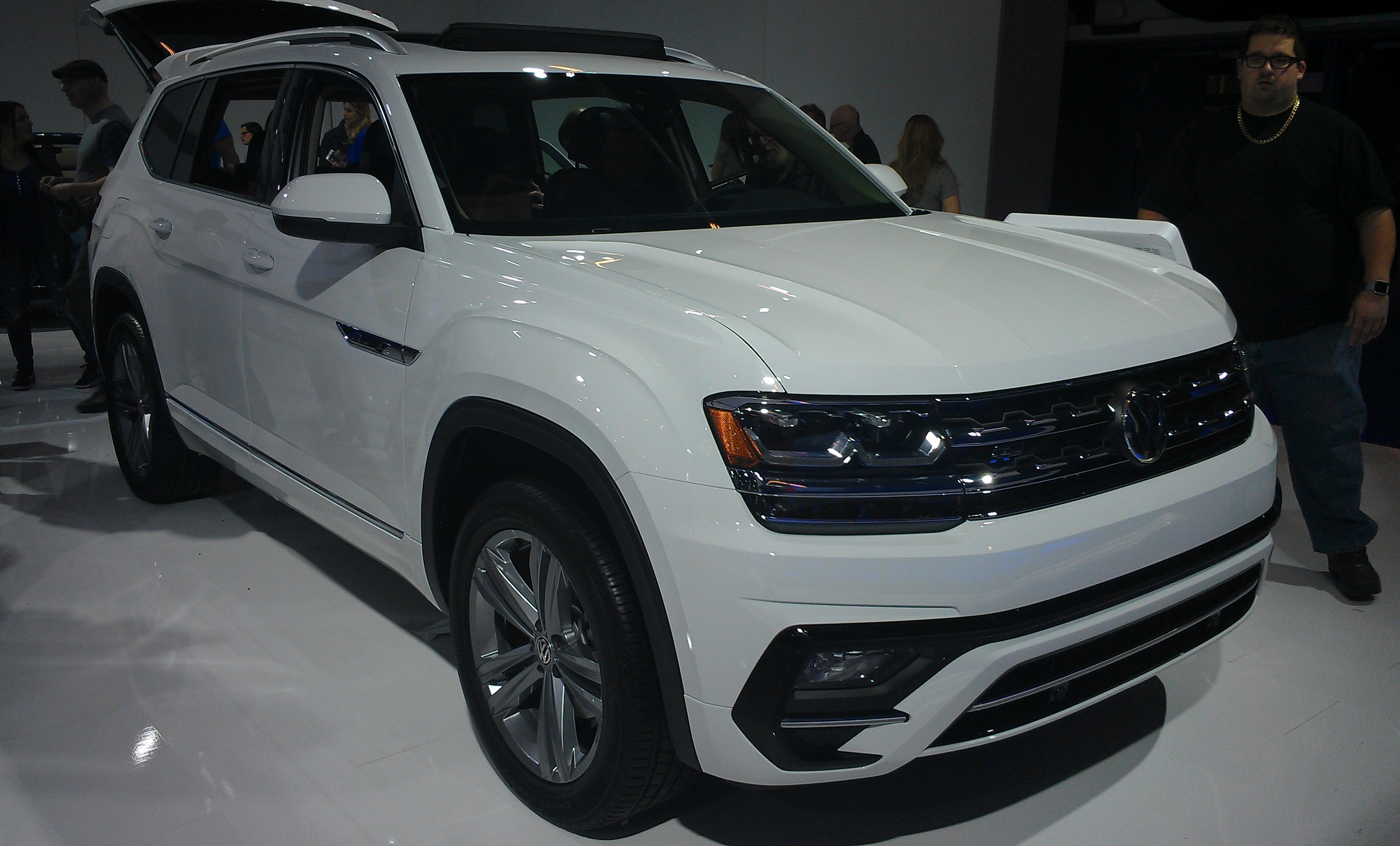
VW Atlas/VW Teramont R-Line

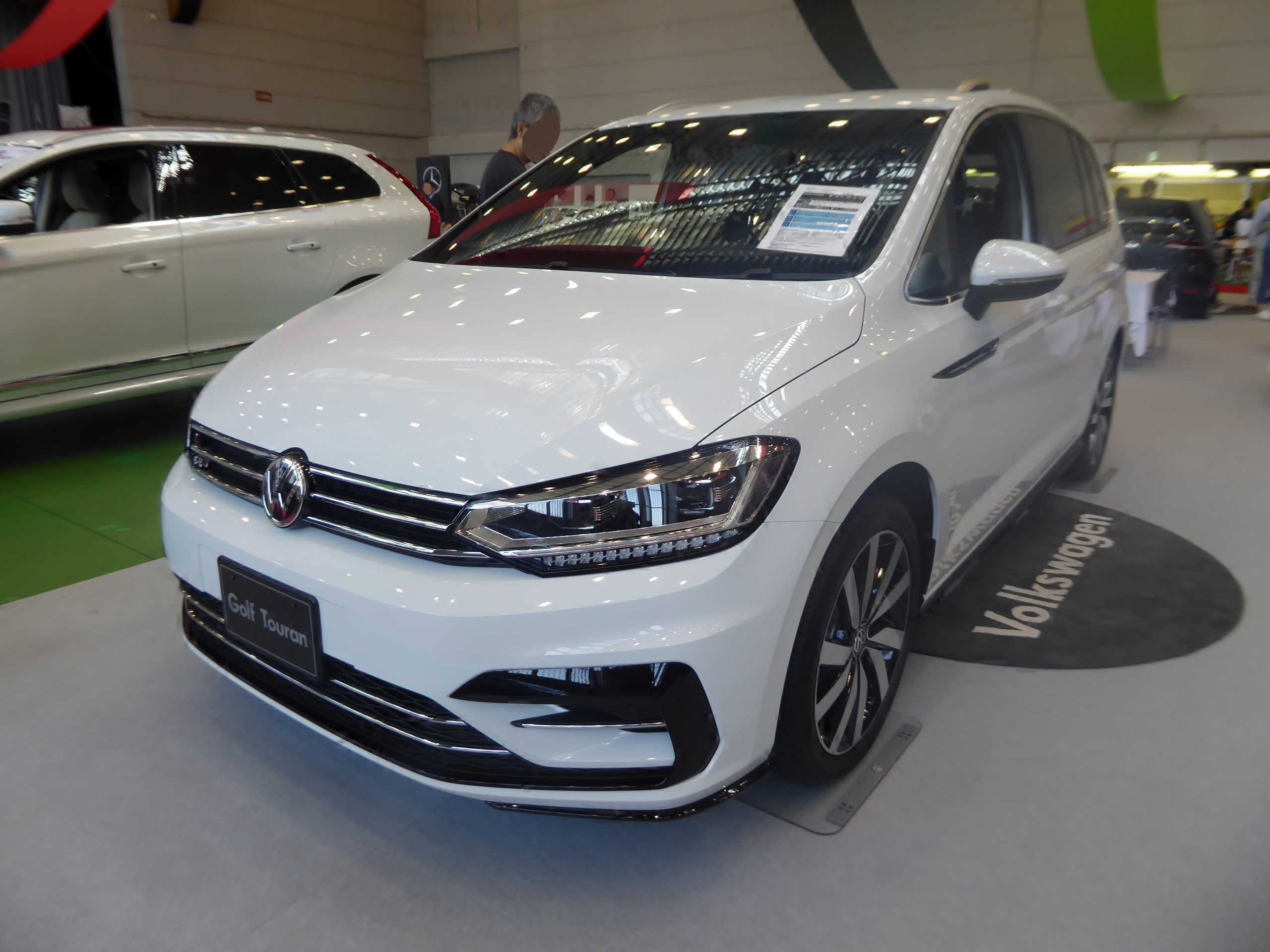
VW Touran R-Line

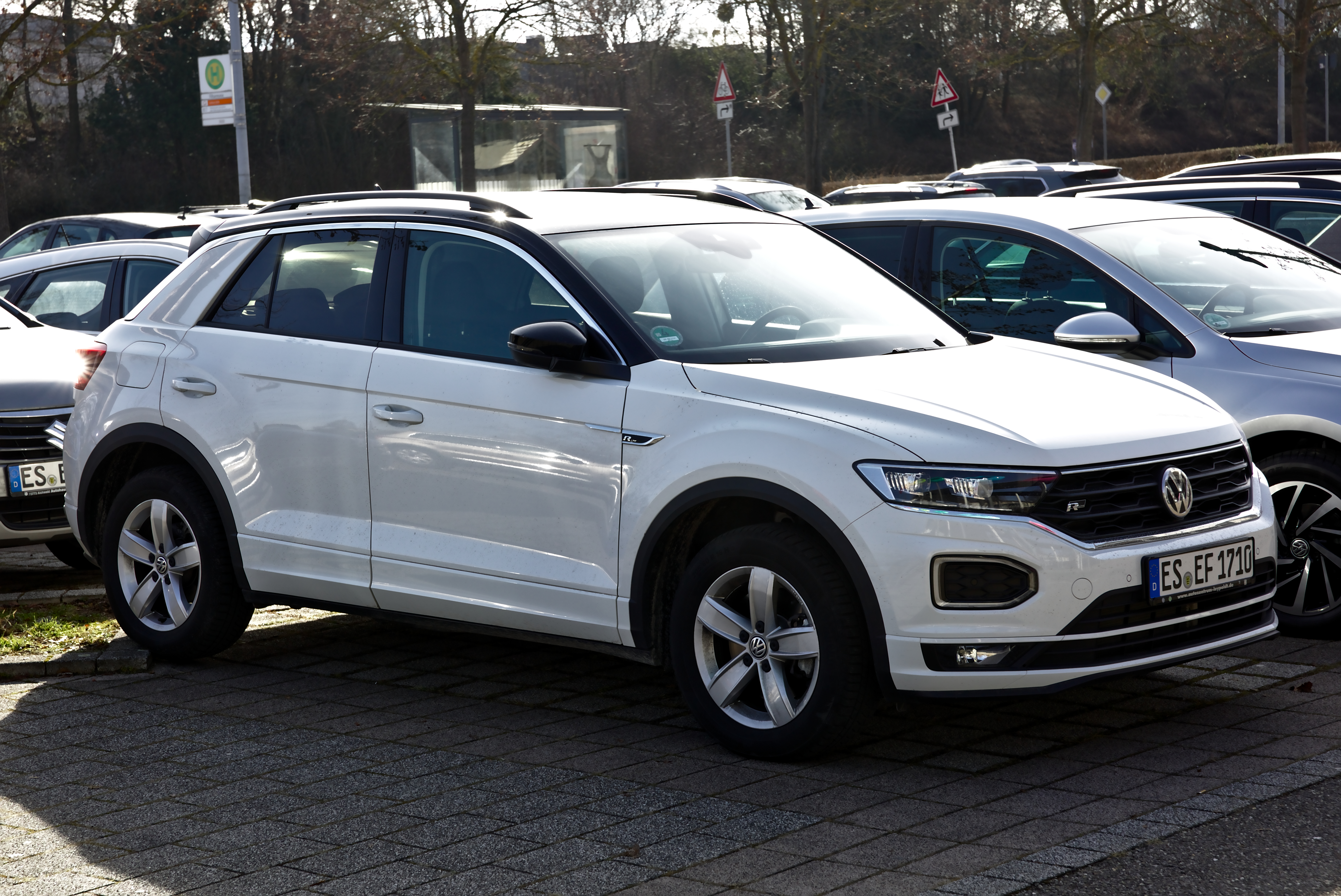
VW T-Roc R-Line

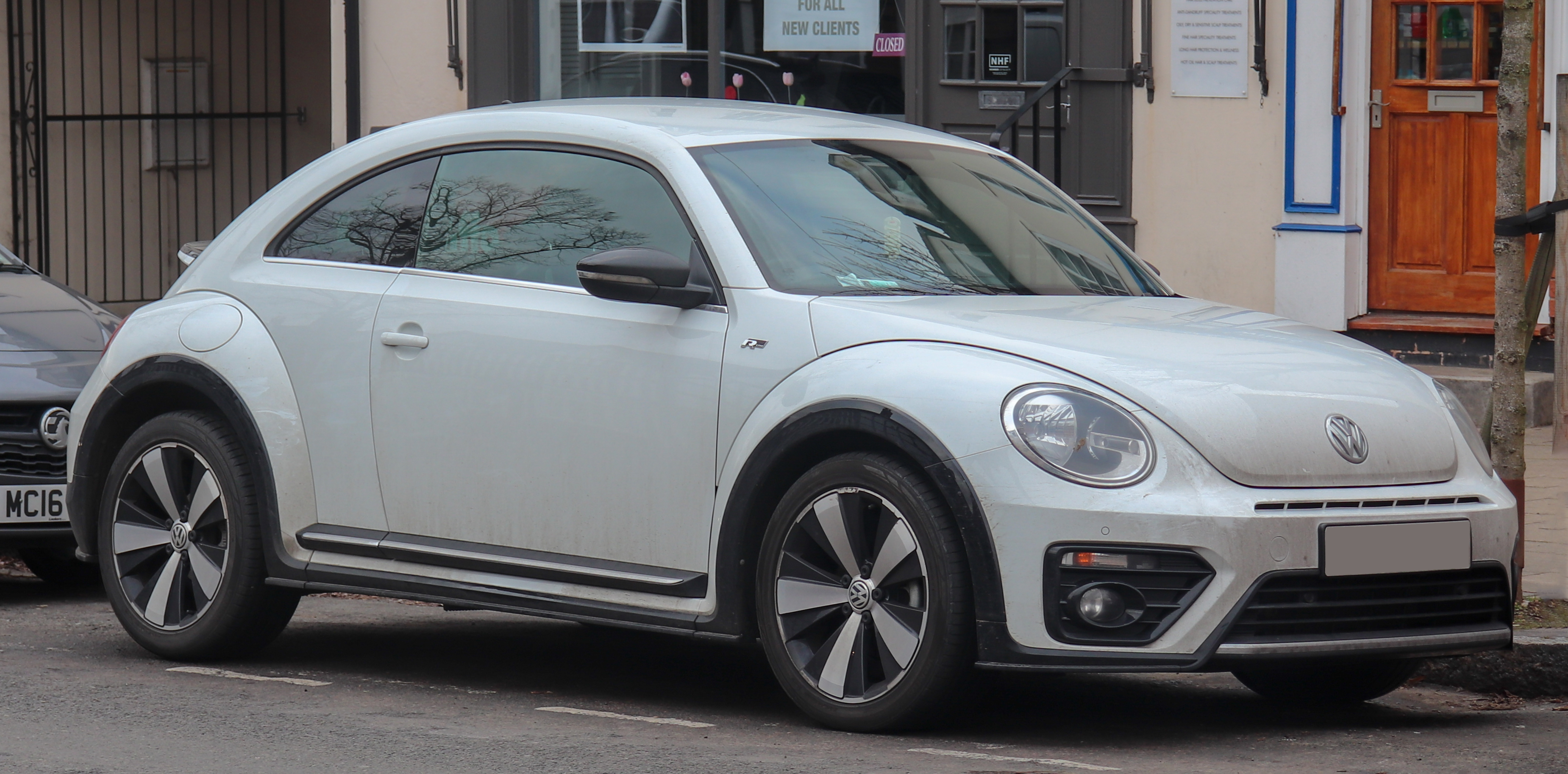
VW Beetle R-Line

== See also ==
- Audi S and RS models
