= Arre =

Arre may refer to:

- Arre (brand), an Indian online entertainment platform by U Digital Content Pvt Ltd
- Arre, Padua, a municipality in the Province of Padua, Italy
- Arre, Gard, a commune in Gard, France
- Arre, a tributary of the Hérault river in France
- ARRE, Assault Regiment, Royal Engineers, a unit of the British Royal Engineers, part of the 79th Armoured Division during World War II

== See also ==
- Årre, small town in southwestern Jutland, Denmark
